= Edrathina =

Edrathina Temporal range: late Ediacaran, ~551 Ma
- Holotype of Edrathina obditchia before (A) and after (B) retrodeformation

Scientific classification
- Kingdom: Animalia
- Phylum: Ctenophora
- Stem group: Ctenophora
- Genus: †Edrathina; Muirhead-Hunt, Rosse-Guillevic, and McIlroy, 2026

Type species
- †Edrathina obditchia Muirhead-Hunt, Rosse-Guillevic, and McIlroy, 2026

Species
- †Edrathina obditchia Muirhead-Hunt, Rosse-Guillevic, and McIlroy, 2026

Extinct genus of comb jellies

Edrathina is an extinct genus of stem-group ctenophore from the late Ediacaran Inner Meadow lagerstätte in Newfoundland, Canada. The type and only known species Edrathina obditchia is known from three specimens on the EM Coombs surface at Inner Meadow. Edrathina is important as it represents the oldest known ctenophore (comb jelly), a group which may be the earliest-diverging animal phylum. Its presence before the Kotlin crisis, along with the crown-group cnidarians Haootia and Mamsetia, suggests that metazoans had already diversified before the Cambrian explosion.

== Etymology ==
The genus name Edrathina was derived from the Beothuk word edrathin "comb" and refers to the similarity of the pinnulate limbs to a two-rowed comb. The name was chosen to honor the Beothuk people, who had inhabited the land where the fossils were found at the time of European colonization, and to reference the fact that Muirhead et al. (2026) believe that the genus is related to modern comb jellies.

The specific name of E. obditchia was derived from the Beothuk word obditch "beast" and refers to the beast-like appearance of E. obditchia with its outstretched pinnulate limbs.

== Description ==
Retrodeformed photograph of Edrathina obditchia holotype NFM F-4037, with a close-up view of the pinnules in B. Scale bar 2 cm in A and 1 cm in B. Abbreviations as follows: di, basal disc (orange); ca, calyx (blue); te, limbs (green); pin, pinnules (pink).

Edrathina obditchia is a polypoid organism with a body composed of a basal disc that serves as a holdfast, a conical calyx, and a crown composed of at least six stiff limbs bearing smaller branches called pinnules. It is known from only three specimens, with the largest being the holotype NFM F-4037 and paratype NFM F-4039. The specimens were compressed due to geological activity, so the authors used retrodeformation techniques to obtain accurate measurements.

The basal disc is subcircular, with a 3.5 cm major axis and 2.8 cm minor axis in the holotype after retrodeformation. The basal disc preserves a central depression and three or four concentric rings preserved as raised ridges.

The calyx is conical and longer than wide, and comprises between 35% and 45% of the total height of the organism. The sides of the calyx are slightly concave, and the upper margin is scalloped. Unlike the Cambrian Dinomischus, Edrathina preserves no evidence of a stalk in the holotype and instead tapers towards the basal disc. However, the calyx is incompletely preserved in both paratypes, so the presence of a stalk cannot be ruled out. There is no evidence of any features on the rim of the crown other than the limbs.

Several tentacle-like limbs originate from the rim of the calyx and spread out with an angle of approximately 75°, forming a 'crown' of tentacles. Known specimens of Edrathina preserve at most six limbs, but it is possible that additional limbs were present on the lower surface but were not preserved. The crown is roughly 7.5 cm tall and 9.9 cm wide in the holotype after retrodeformation.

The limbs are straight or slightly curved, and are situated at equal distances around the rim of the calyx. They usually taper away from the calyx, but in the paratype NFM F-4038 maintain a constant length throughout. Each limb bears paired rows of nearly parallel pinnules, with a maximum of sixteen pinnules preserved in a single row. The pinnules range from 5 to 22 mm in length in the holotype and are equally spaced, with a gap of around 1 mm between adjacent pinnules in the holotype. The pinnules taper distally and emerge from the limbs at an angle of around 60°-70° relative to the limb axis. The rows of pinnules are offset rather than directly opposite each other, though this may be a preservational artifact.

=== Comparison with similar forms ===
Muirhead-Hunt et al. (2026) compared Edrathina to both other stem-group ctenophores and to similar taxa among the Cnidaria and the Rangeomorpha.

Edrathina is similar to the Dinomischidae, a Cambrian family of polypoid stem-group ctenophores, in having radially arranged, pinnulate tentacles arising from a calyx. However, Edrathina has six tentacles as opposed to the eighteen in the dinomischids. The stem-ctenophore Siphusauctum is similar to Edrathina in having six tentacles, but unlike Edrathina has a globular calyx and tentacles that lack pinnules. Edrathina also differs from both dinomischids and Siphusauctum in lacking outer tentacle sheaths.

Edrathina differs from the contemporaneous polypoid cnidarians Haootia and Mamsetia in being preserved as an external cast, as opposed to the preservation of internal muscles in Haootia and Mamsetia.

Edrathina is broadly similar to the branching rangeomorphs Primocandelabrum and Hylaecullulus in having a basal disc similar to Aspidella and a branching crown, but does not show fractal branching so cannot be assigned to the Rangeomorpha. In addition, it differs from Primocandelabrum and Hylaecullulus in that:

1. The limbs of Edrathina arise from a conical calyx, while the branches of Primocandelabrum and Hylaecullulus arise from a thick stem.
2. Edrathina is hexaradially symmetrical, which is not known from any branching rangeomorphs.
3. Edrathina's limbs are unbranching, while the proximal branches of Primocandelabrum and Hylaecullulus bifurcate.
4. The pinnules of Edrathina cannot represent the branch axes of rangeomorphs, as they are straight rather than zig-zagged.

While the basal disc of Edrathina is similar to the Aspidella basal disc of Rangeomorpha, similar basal discs are present in the Arboreomorpha and in macroalgae, which suggests that they were convergently evolved.

== Phylogeny ==
Muirhead-Hunt et al. (2026) ran three Bayesian phylogenetic analyses based on three different constraints on evolutionary results. The first analyses was unconstrained, while the other two were an analysis enforcing the presence of ParaHoxozoa (a monophyletic group of Placozoa, Cnidaria, and Bilateria) and an analysis constraining Ctenophora as the earliest-diverging metazoan phylum. All three analyses recovered Edrathina as a stem-group ctenophore and the sister taxon to a monophyletic Dinomischidae. However, they acknowledged that several informative characters (like the presence of cilia and internal structures of the calyx) were not preserved and could not be scored.

Optimal unconstrained Bayesian tree

- - Choanoflagellatea
  - Porifera
  - - Placozoa
    - - Bilateria
      - - Cnidaria
          - Anthozoa
          - - Hydrozoa
            - - - Atorella
                - Nausithoe
              - - Aurelia
                - Rhizostoma
              - - - Craterolophus
                  - Haliclystus
                  - †Haootia
                  - †Mamsetia
                - - Chiropsalmus
                  - - Carukia
                    - Carybdea
        - Ctenophora total group
          - - †Edrathina
            - - †Dinomischus isolatus
              - †Dinomischus venustus
              - - †Calathites
                - - †Daihua
                  - †Xianguangia
          - - †Siphusauctum
            - Ctenophora

Optimal Bayesian tree with ParaHoxozoa constrained as monophyletic

- - Choanoflagellatea
  - Porifera
  - - - Placozoa
      - - Bilateria
        - Cnidaria
          - Anthozoa
          - - Hydrozoa
            - - - Atorella
                - Nausithoe
              - - Aurelia
                - Rhizostoma
              - - - Craterolophus
                  - Haliclystus
                  - †Haootia
                  - †Mamsetia
                - - Chiropsalmus
                  - - Carukia
                    - Carybdea
    - Ctenophora total group
      - - †Edrathina
        - - †Dinomischus isolatus
          - †Dinomischus venustus
          - - †Calathites
            - - †Daihua
              - †Xianguangia
      - - †Siphusauctum
        - Ctenophora

Optimal Bayesian tree with Ctenophora constrained as diverging first

- - Choanoflagellatea
  - - Porifera
    - - Bilateria
      - - Placozoa
        - Cnidaria
          - Anthozoa
          - - Hydrozoa
            - - - Atorella
                - Nausithoe
              - - Aurelia
                - Rhizostoma
              - - - Craterolophus
                  - Haliclystus
                  - †Haootia
                  - †Mamsetia
                - - Chiropsalmus
                  - - Carukia
                    - Carybdea
  - Ctenophora total group
    - - †Edrathina
      - - †Dinomischus isolatus
        - †Dinomischus venustus
        - - †Calathites
          - - †Daihua
            - †Xianguangia
    - - †Siphusauctum
      - Ctenophora

== Paleobiology ==
Reconstructions of Edrathina obditchia in life (A) and collapsed on the seafloor after death (B)

Edrathina would have been an sessile epibenthic organism in life and likely stood upright rather than reclining on the seabed. This is supported by the positive relief of the specimens, in contrast to the strong negative relief of reclining rangeomorphs from the same bedding plane. The basal disc is preserved as a shallow imprint, suggesting that it served to 'stick' the organism on the surface of the matgrounds at Inner Meadow. The pinnules likely served to capture food particles and may have had comb plates similar to Cambrian dinomischids.

== Paleoenvironment and preservation ==
Edrathina is only known from three specimens from the EM Coombs surface of the Inner Meadow lagerstätte of Newfoundland, Canada. The specimens are preserved as an external mold in positive relief. The three-dimensional preservation of Edrathina and the consistently linear form of the limbs and pinnules suggests that in life, the organism was stiffened, though sclerotization as in Cambrian dinomischids could not be confirmed. All three specimens were left uncollected to follow Newfoundland and Labrador law, so cast replicas of the type specimens (plastotypes) were made instead.

The EM Coombs surface is part of the deep-water Fermeuse Formation. The surface is composed of gray siltstone that is overlain by a thin tuffite bed composed of volcanic ash. The presence of zircons in the overlying ash bed allows the deposition of the Inner Meadow lagerstätte to be dated to 551 mya. The EM Coombs surface was distorted due to deformation of the Avalon Peninsula in the Early Paleozoic, resulting in compression of the fossils that was corrected with retrodeformation techniques. The surface is also glacially scoured in certain places.

The Inner Meadow lagerstätte was deposited in a deep-water, continental shelf environment. The bedding plane is covered by a matground that has a 'bubbly' texture caused by gas bubbles accumulating beneath the mat surface. Edrathina coexisted with a typical Avalon Assemblage fauna of rangeomorphs such as Charnia and Fractofusus, arboreomorphs such as Arborea and Charniodiscus, the erniettomorph Phyllozoon, other fossils such as Hiemalora, Uncus, and Hadrynichorde.
