= Fermeuse Formation =

Geological formation in Canada

- Stratigraphic range: late Ediacaran; ~560–550.78 Ma
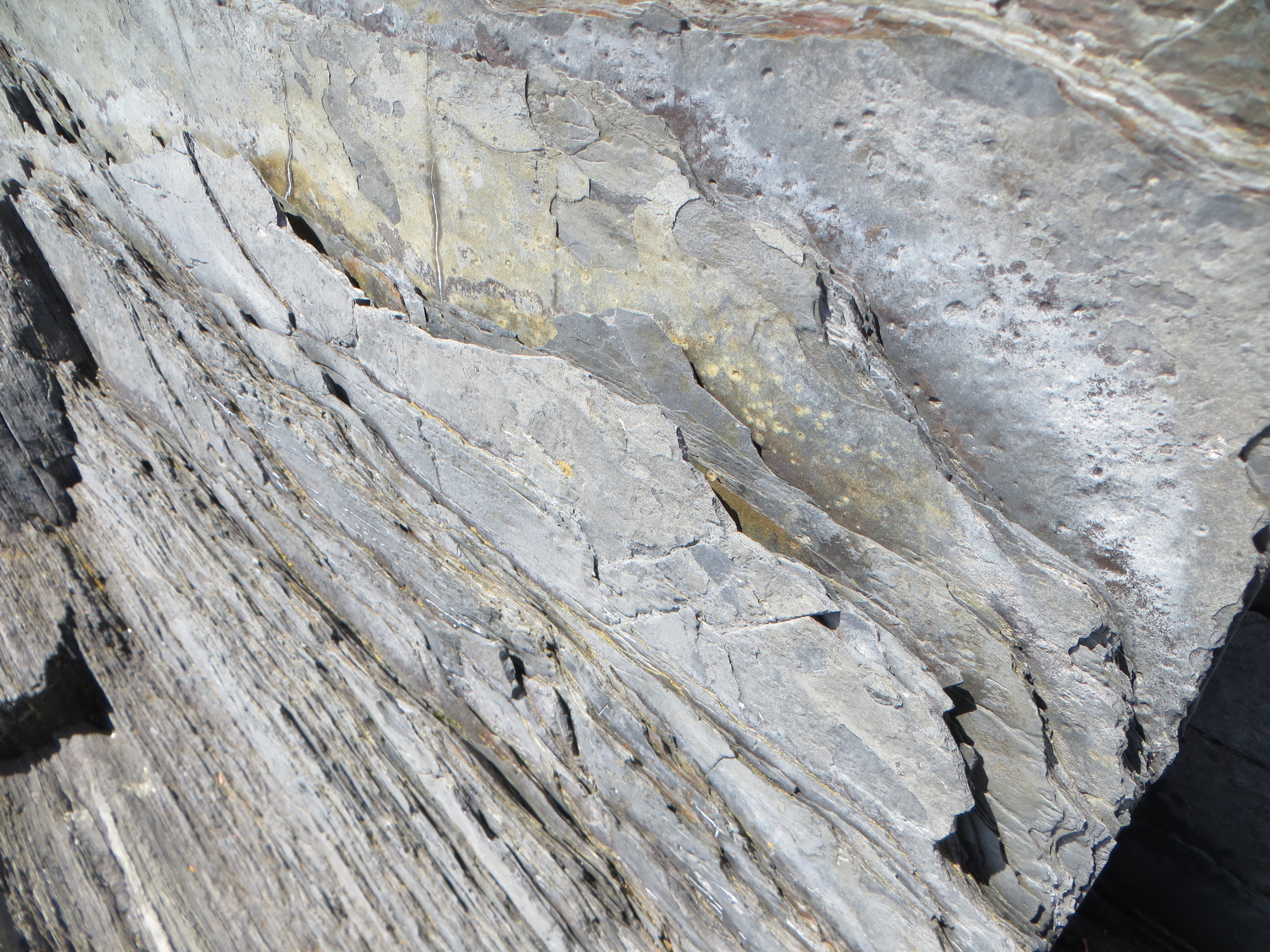
- Beds of the Fermeuse Formation near Ferryland, NL; note Aspidella discs
- Type: Formation
- Unit of: St John's Group
- Sub-units: Inner Meadow Lagerstätte
- Underlies: Renews Head Formation
- Overlies: Trepassey Formation
- Thickness: 1400 m (4,593 ft)

Lithology
- Primary: Gray Shale
- Other: Sandstone, Siltstone

Location
- Region: Newfoundland and Labrador
- Country: Canada
- Occurrence of Fermeuse formation in southeast Newfoundland

The Fermeuse Formation is a geologic formation in Newfoundland and Labrador, Canada. It contains fossils dating back to the Ediacaran period, which are found on outcrops within the Avalon and Bonavista Peninsulas.

== Depositional environment ==
On Bonavista Peninsula the depositional environment was a slope and outer shelf–below photic zone Turbidites probably were the dominant sediment transporters.

It is predominantly silts and sands, in contrast to underlying Trepassey Formation, which is mostly dark grey shales. There is a coarsening up sequence throughout the two formations, such that the top of the Fermeuse is predominantly sandstones. On Avalon Peninsula there were much shallower waters, particularly than in underlying Mistaken Point Formation and Trepassey Formation. It is indicated by sandy channel fills, slumping, occasional silts. There is a possible delta front and shallow slope setting.

The formations also contains the Inner Meadow Lagerstätte, a site which has been dated to 550.78 million years ago, placing it within the White Sea assemblage. It contains fauna primarily known from this formation and others within Newfoundland, alongside some rarer examples from other White Sea aged formations such as the Rawnsley Quartzite, although the exact location of the site is unknown, primarily due to provincial laws on significant fossil sites.

== Paleobiota ==
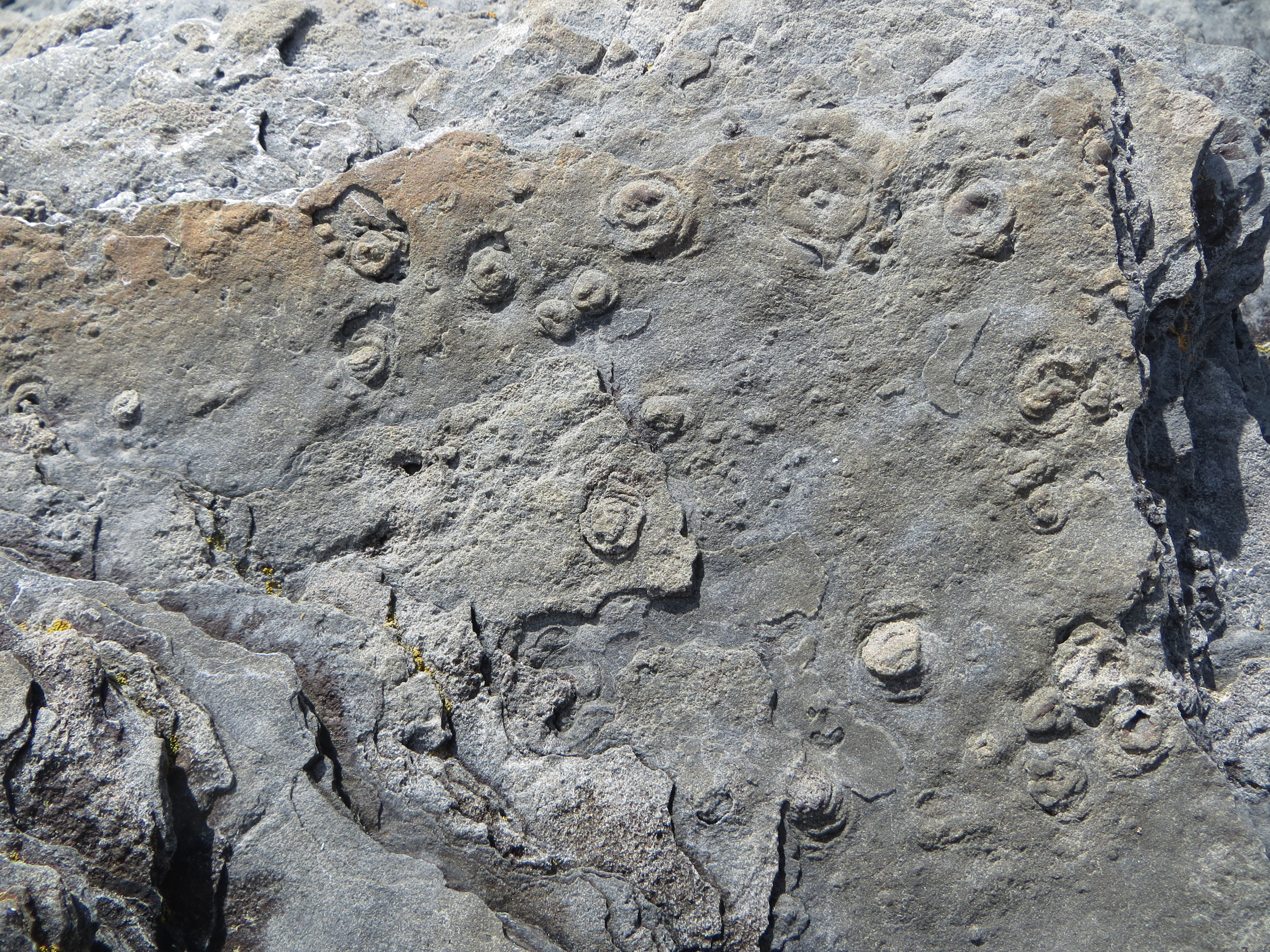
1-2 centimetre-wide Aspidella discs (and some smaller mm-sized individuals) on a bedding surface of the Fermeuse Formation near Ferryland, Newfoundland

On Avalon Peninsula there is low diversity, and includes rare agglutinating organisms, Palaeopascichnus, and Aspidella discs, sometimes in great concentrations.

On Bonavista Peninsula there is higher diversity, including more fronds (rangeomorphs) and better preserved than on Avalon Peninsula.

Color key
Taxon	Reclassified taxon	Taxon falsely reported as present	Dubious taxon or junior synonym	Ichnotaxon	Ootaxon	Morphotaxon

Notes
Uncertain or tentative taxa are in small text; ~~crossed out~~ taxa are discredited.

=== Petalonamae ===
Genus	Species	Notes	Images
Arborea	A. spinosa; A. arborea(?)	Sessile frondose organism, A. spinosa was previously described as a species of Charniodiscus. A. arborea may be considered belonging to Charniodiscus.	
Bradgatia	B. linfordensis	Sessile frondose organism.	
Charnia	C. masoni	Sessile frondose organism.	
Charniodiscus	Charniodiscus sp.; C. arboreus(?)	Sessile frondose organism. C. arboreus may be considered belonging to Arborea.	
Fractofusus	F. andersoni	Sessile spindle-like frondose organism.	
Primocandelabrum	Primocandelabrum sp.; P. heimaloranum	Sessile frondose organism.	
Vinlandia	V. antecedens	Sessile frondose organism, previously reported as a species of Charnia.	

=== Cnidaria ===
Genus	Species	Notes	Images
Haootia	H. quadriformis	Staurozoan cnidarian.	
Hiemalora	H. stellaris	Discoid organism, possibly holdfasts of petalonamids.	

=== incertae sedis ===
Genus	Species	Notes	Images
Aspidella	A. terranovica	Enigmatic discoidal fossil.	
Hadrynichorde	H. catalinensis	Sea Whip-like frondose organism.	
Palaeopascichnus	P. delicatus	Palaeopascichnid organism.	

=== Ivesheadiomorphs ===
Genus	Species	Notes	Images
Ivesheadia	I. lobata	Poorly preserved organism.	

=== Ichnogenera ===
Genus	Species	Notes	Images
Neonereites	Neonereites sp.	Burrows.	

== See also ==
- List of fossiliferous stratigraphic units in Newfoundland and Labrador
