= Inner Meadow =

Fossil deposit in Canada

- Stratigraphic range: late Ediacaran; ~550.78 Ma
- The E.M. Coombs Surface from the Inner Meadow site in Newfoundland, Canada.
- Type: Lagerstätte
- Unit of: Fermeuse Formation
- Area: 40 m^{2} (430 sq ft)

Lithology
- Primary: Mudrock
- Other: Sandstone, Siltstone

Location
- Region: Newfoundland and Labrador
- Country: Canada

Type section
- Named by: McIlroy et al.
- Year defined: 2026

The Inner Meadow is an Ediacaran aged fossiliferous deposit, and is found close to outcroppings of the Fermeuse Formation, near to Upper Island Cove on the island of Newfoundland and Labrador in Canada. Considered to be a lagerstätte, it contains biota most commonly found in the Avalon assemblage, showing that both the Avalon and White Sea assemblages are contemporaneous, with the only differences between the two being ecology.

== History of research ==
The site was originally found by the Coombs family in 2023, who own the land the locality sits within, when trying to find where water was coming from after a storm had hit the area, finding a 20 cm (7.9 in) long petalonamid fossil in the process. An image of the fossil was posted to an online Facebook group known as "Newfound fossils", where it was picked up by local researchers, who were then given permission to excavate more of the site, discovering even more fossils.

The site was immediately recognised for its great density of fossils, which was more than what is seen at the Mistaken Point Formation. The fossils are also on average notably larger and better preserved, which allowed for more scrutinised studies to be undertaken, which was noted would take 3–4 years.

Multiple fossils were slowly described from the locality over the intervening years since the discovery of the site, such as Aninoides, a 1 m (3 ft 3.4 in) long petalonamid, and Charnia brasieri in 2025. The site itself would be formally described in January 2026, although research continues.

== Geology ==
The Inner Meadow site is primarily composed of thick, structureless mudrock, with a thin layer of sandstone and green siltstone, which is tuffaceous and calcareous in nature. The current known area of the locality is 40 m^{2} (430 sq ft), although it has been noted that any edge to the site has yet to be found, and as such this may increase with further excavations. It is known to outcrop near or within the wider Fermeuse Formation, and is thus assigned to it.

The uncovered surface at Inner Meadow also shows that there was a notable extensive, thick mat-ground covering, which permitted a wide spread of "bubble fields", formed by the build-up and accumulation of gases beneath the mat-ground. When the mat-ground was buried and decayed, these trapped gases would then be released, letting softer tuffaceous sediments into the hemispherical cavities left behind and preserving them. Later weathering of the overlaying sediments would then have occurred, leaving the surface at Inner Meadow covered in negative-relief hemispherical impressions, something that is unique compared to other formations and surfaces in Newfoundland, which only contain "bubble trains".

== Dating ==
The Inner Meadow site has been dated using U–Pb dating on several zircon samples, recovering at date of 550.78±0.60 Ma, placing the site, and the Avalon assemblage biota found in it, firmly within what is known as the White Sea assemblage. Alongside this, the site was also deposited just before what is known as the Kotlin Crisis, one of the first notable extinction events of the Ediacaran period, which previously was thought to only affect biota known from White Sea assemblage aged rocks.

== Taphonomy and deformation ==
Fossils from the Inner Meadow Lagerstätte in the Fermeuse Formation after retro-deformation.

The fossils found within the Inner Meadow have been noted to be the strarigraphically highest occurrences of Conception-type preservation, where the organisms were buried below a bed of volcanic ash, which aided in the exceptional preservation of certain details. Although, it has been noted that the preservation differs from the Cambrian Burgess Shale-type preservation, being coarser in detail, obscuring certain details whilst still retaining some hints of faintly sclerotised body tissues.

The fossils here are also subject to a lot of deformation, where the rock itself has been reshaped due to the movement of magma, causing the preserved material to also change in shape from its original size and shape, thus requiring retro-deformation. This has been achieved on fossils in the Inner Meadow using basal discs as strain markers, which are notably common in Ediacaran rocks, based on the assumption that they were originally circular. Despite this, it is noted that this may not always be the case as some discs can also be elliptical in nature, varying in shape even on a single surface. A later study would confirm this to be the case after analysing 287 basal discs, discovering that this studied collection expressed a heterogeneity in ellipticity, meaning they ranged from circular to elliptical, or eccentric, morphologies. With this, it was concluded that individual basal discs are unreliable for use as strain markers, and thus suggested that other methods would need to be sought, such as the Breddin/Wellman method.

== Paleoenvironment ==
The depositional environment of the Inner Meadow site has been suggested to be that of an offshore shelf setting, below the storm-wave base, inferred from the presence of the notably thick preserved matground, as well as the presence of "bubble fields".

== Paleobiota ==
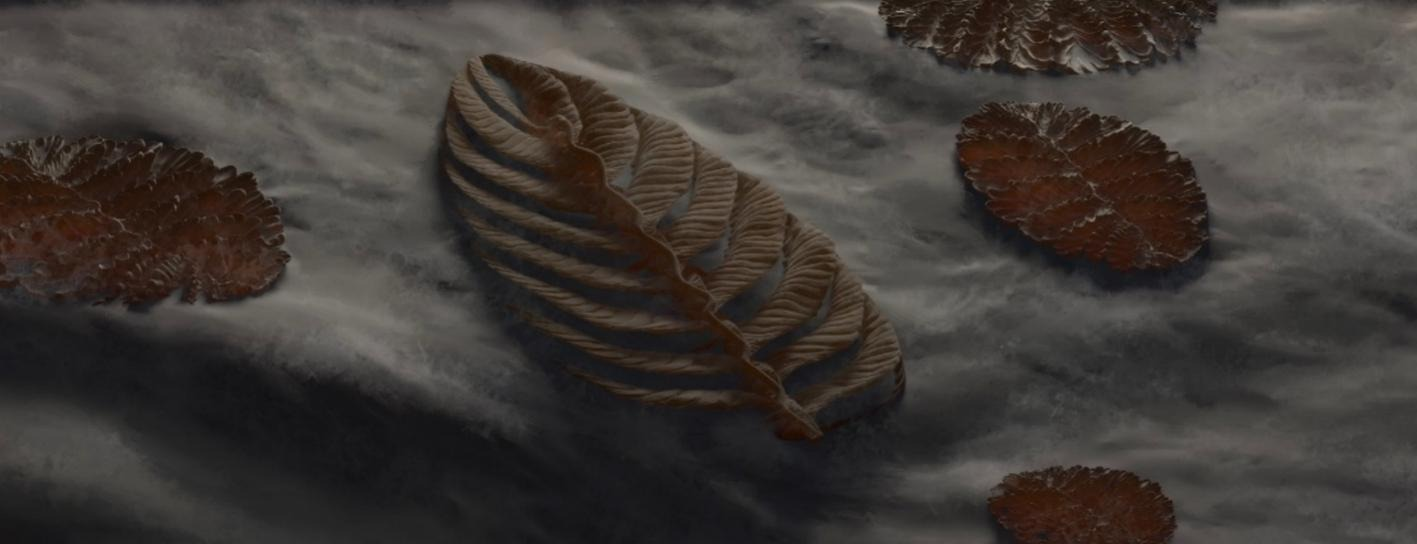
3D reconstructions of Charnia brasieri from the Inner Meadow Lagerstätte, surrounded by Fractofusus andersoni

The Inner Meadow contains a wealth of organisms previously only known from Avalon aged rocks on what is known as the EM Coombs surface, like Frondophyllas and Pectinifrons, in White Sea aged rocks, showing that the biota of the Avalon assemblage survived later than originally thought. Although it is noted, much like a majority of the biota from White Sea aged rocks, they did not survive beyond the Kotlin Crisis into Nama assemblage aged strata, showing also that this extinction event was far greater than previously suggested by affecting not just one, but two assemblage biotas, with 80% of known life lost. The exact cause of this extinction event still remains unknown, with a sudden drop in oxygen or increasing levels of predation from cnidarians being put forward as probable causes.

Color key: Taxon / Reclassified taxon / Taxon falsely reported as present / Dubious taxon or junior synonym / Ichnotaxon / Ootaxon / Morphotaxon

Notes
Uncertain or tentative taxa are in small text
~~crossed out~~ taxa are discredited.

=== Bilaterian ===
Genus	Species	Notes	Images
Uncus	Uncus sp.	Worm-like organism, first recorded appearance outside of Australia.	

=== Petalonamae ===
Genus	Species	Notes	Images
Arborea	A. spinosa	Sessile arboreomorph organism.	
Aninoides	A. coombsorum	Sessile rangeomorph organism.	
Beothukis	Beothukis sp.	Sessile rangeomorph organism.	
Bradgatia	Bradgatia sp.	Sessile rangeomorph organism.	
Broccoliforma	Broccoliforma sp.	Sessile rangeomorph organism.	
Charnia	C. masoni; C. brasieri; C. gracilis	Sessile rangeomorph organism.	
Charniodiscus	C. procerus	Sessile arboreomorph organism.	
Fractofusus	F. andersoni	Sessile spindle-like rangeomorph organism.	
Frondophyllas	Frondophyllas sp.	Sessile tree-like rangeomorph organism.	
Pectinifrons	Pectinifrons sp.	Sessile comb-like rangeomorph organism.	
Phyllozoon	Phyllozoon sp.	Sessile erniettomorph organism, first recorded appearance outside of Australia.	
Plumeropriscum	Plumeropriscum sp.	Sessile rangeomorph organism.	
Primocandelabrum	Primocandelabrum sp.	Sessile feather-duster rangeomorph organism.	
Trepassia	Trepassia sp.	Sessile rangeomorph organism.	

=== Ctenophora ===
Genus	Species	Notes	Images
Edrathina	E. obditchia	Stem-group ctenophore, recovered as a likely sister-taxon to the Dinomischidae.	

=== incertae sedis ===
Genus	Species	Notes	Images
Aspidella	Aspidella sp.	Enigmatic discoidal fossil.	
Hadrynichorde	Hadrynichorde sp.	Sea Whip-like frondose organism.	
Hiemalora	H. pleiomorpha	Discoid organism, possibly holdfasts of petalonamids.	

=== Ivesheadiomorphs ===
Genus	Species	Notes	Images
Ivesheadia	Ivesheadia sp.	Poorly preserved organism.	

=== Ichnogenera ===
Genus	Species	Notes	Images
Helminthoidichnites	Helminthoidichnites sp.	Burrows.	

== See also ==
- List of fossiliferous stratigraphic units in Canada
- Ediacaran biota
