= Trepassey Formation =

Geologic formation in Newfoundland, Canada

- Stratigraphic range: late Ediacaran; ~565–560 Ma
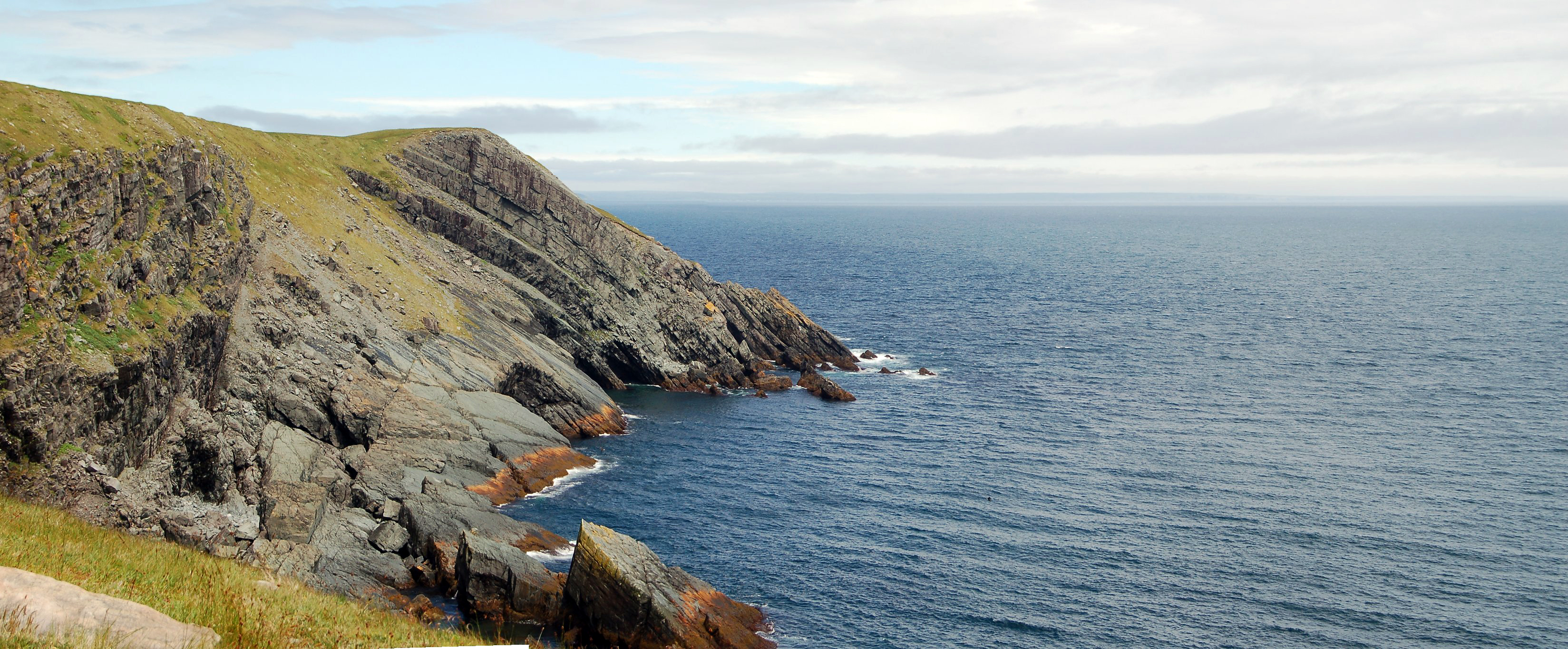
- Trepassey Bay, the locality after which the formation is named.
- Type: Formation
- Unit of: St John's Group
- Sub-units: See: Members
- Underlies: Fermeuse Formation
- Overlies: Mistaken Point Formation
- Thickness: 300 m (984 ft)

Lithology
- Primary: Gray Sandstone
- Other: Shale, Tuff, Mudstone, Siltstone, Agglomerate

Location
- Coordinates: 46.66°N 53.34°W
- Region: Newfoundland
- Country: Canada

Type section
- Named for: Trepassey Bay
- Occurrence in southeast NL

The Trepassey Formation is a geologic formation that crops out in Newfoundland, which consists of gray sandstones and rare tuffaceous rocks. It also preserves fossils dating back to the Ediacaran period, which were buried on a deep ocean marginal slope.

== Geology ==
The Trepassey Formation is primarily composed of a series of thin-bedded, fine-grained turbidites, a type of deposit found in deep ocean areas. It is sharply and conformably overlain by the shale dominated Fermeuse Formation, and conformably underlain by the argillaceous Mistaken Point Formation.

=== Facies ===
The formation contains up to known six facies, which are as follows:

- Facies 1: This facies only gets up to 90 cm (35.4 in) thick in some areas, and is composed of grains which range from sizes of silt to very fine sand. Overlying these facies are green mudstones, which are structureless in nature.
- Facies 2: This facies has an unknown thickness, but features rippled cross-lamination, which are overlain by draping or flat lamination and structureless mudstones, and contains grains with sizes ranging from very fine to medium sand. Where the ripples are visible, they are always going toward a southern to south-western direction. There are also some areas of this facies that contains rare structureless sandstones.
- Facies 3: Parts of this facies is entirely restricted to this formation and contains two beds, 3A and 3B. 3A only gets up to 50 cm (19.7 in) thick, and is composed of yellowish-green sandstone, which itself contains medium to coarse-grained, angular to sub-rounded quartz and feldspar grains, and is the restricted bed. At the base of 3A there can also be found dark-gray mudstone clasts, usually up to 3 cm (1.2 in) long. Meanwhile, 3B is not measured, but is composed of structureless beds that contain high amounts of ash.
- Facies 4: This facies is not measured, and contains thin crystalline tuff layers, and are far less common than is seen in the underlying Mistaken Point Formation.
- Facies 5: Similar to Facies 4, this facies rarely appears in the formation, only occurring at the very top. It is not measured, and contains intraformational tubular mudstone clasts that can range from 2–50 cm (0.8–19.7 in) long, alongside laminated mudstones.
- Facies 6: This facies is very thin, only getting up to a few centimetres in thickness, and is primarily composed of laminated mudstones. The thickness of the facies is notably uniform, and contains irregular silt-sized grains, separated by clay and a black carbonaceous material, which may possibly be the remains of microbial mats.

=== Members ===
The formation has also been split into two members, which are as follows, in ascending stratigraphic order (lowest to highest):

- Catalina Member: This lower member, which has only been measured in one area up to 50 m (160 ft) thick, is primarily composed of the mudstone and siltstone bearing facies and beds, as well as occasional sandstones. These are predominately greenish-gray in colour, and are thin to medium-bedded. In the upper sections of this member, there can also be found cross-stratified sandstone. This member is also the fossiliferous of the two.
- Port Union Member: This upper member, which can get up to 94 m (308 ft) thick, is dominated by the sandstone facies and beds. These gray sandstones are fine to very-coarse-grained, and is primarily quartzo-feldspathic in nature. There are also interbedded layers of mudstone, sandstone, agglomerate, and tuff. The coarser layers of this member are volcanogenic in nature, containing a mixture of pyroclastic debris and sediments, which does not allow for the preservation of fossil material.

== Paleoenvironment ==
The environment of the Trepassey Formation, at the time of its deposition, was on a deep ocean marginal slope. This has been inferred from the finer grains and southern palaeocurrent, which is consistent with marginal slope environments, especially ones that sit just above the turbidity currents, fast moving water, that would have carried much coarser grained material. There are also slumped units present within the formation, hinting towards the presence of an appreciable slope, which further suggests that the Trepassey Formation was deposited on a very steep marginal slope.

== Paleobiota ==
Like the other overlying and underlying formations, the Trepassey Formation represents a rare deep-marine paleoenviroment, situated on a slope, which was home to various sessile forms, like the petalonamids Fractofusus and Trepassia, and even rare examples of organisms related to modern animals, like the staurozoan cnidarian Mamsetia, previously the paratype of Haootia.

Color key: Taxon / Reclassified taxon / Taxon falsely reported as present / Dubious taxon or junior synonym / Ichnotaxon / Ootaxon / Morphotaxon

Notes
Uncertain or tentative taxa are in small text
~~crossed out~~ taxa are discredited.

=== Petalonamae ===
Genus	Species	Notes	Images
Arborea	A. spinosa	Sessile frondose organism, A. spinosa was previously described as a species of Charniodiscus.	
Avalofractus	A. abaculus	Sessile frondose organism.	
Beothukis	B. mistakensis	Sessile frondose organism.	
Bradgatia	B. linfordensis	Sessile frondose organism.	
Charnia	C. masoni	Sessile frondose organism.	
Charniodiscus	Charniodiscus sp.; C. procerus	Sessile frondose organism.	
Fractofusus	F. andersoni	Sessile spindle-like frondose organism.	
Pectinifrons	P. abyssalis	Sessile comb-like organism.	
Primocandelabrum	Primocandelabrum sp.	Sessile frondose organism.	
Trepassia	T. wardae	Sessile frondose organism.	
Vinlandia	V. antecedens	Sessile frondose organism, previously reported as a species of Charnia.	

=== Cnidaria ===
Genus	Species	Notes	Images
Haootia	H. quadriformis	Staurozoan cnidarian.	
Mamsetia	M. manunis	Staurozoan cnidarian.	

=== incertae sedis ===
Genus	Species	Notes	Images
Aspidella	A. terranovica	Enigmatic discoidal fossil.	
Hadrynichorde	H. catalinensis.	Sea Whip-like frondose organism.	
Palaeopascichnus	Palaeopascichnus sp.	Palaeopascichnid organism.	
Lydonia	L jiggamintia	Ovate sponge-like organism, previously assigned to some Blackbrookia specimens.	

=== Ivesheadiomorphs ===
Genus	Species	Notes	Images
Ivesheadia	I. lobata	Poorly preserved organism.	
Blackbrookia	Blackbrookia sp.	Poorly preserved organism.	

=== Ichnogenera ===
Genus	Species	Notes	Images
Neonereites	Neonereites sp.	Burrows.	

== See also ==
- List of fossiliferous stratigraphic units in Newfoundland and Labrador
