= Bay de Verde Formation =

Formation in Newfoundland, Canada

- Stratigraphic range: Ediacaran
- Type: Formation
- Unit of: Signal Hill Group
- Sub-units: Old Pelican, Baccalieu, Cooks Cove and Grates Cove Members
- Overlies: Gibbett Hill Formation

Lithology
- Primary: Red and gray-white Sandstone
- Other: Mudstone, Siltstone, Conglomerates

Location
- Region: Newfoundland
- Country: Canada
- Occurrence of the Bay de Verde Formation in southeastern Newfoundland

The Bay de Verde Formation is an Ediacaran formation cropping out in Newfoundland.

== Geology ==
It predominantly consists of a red to gray sandstone, interlaced with various mudstones, siltstones, and conglomerates, and consists of 4 members, which are as follows, in ascending stratigraphic order (lowest to highest):

- Old Pelican Member: Largest member out of the 4, consists of red and gray-white sandstones, red mudstones and siltstones.
- Baccalieu Member: Second largest member, consists of red pebble-cobble conglomerates, sandstone, with a minor amount of mudstone.
- Cooks Cove Member: Green-gray sandstones, inter-bedded with siltstones.
- Grates Cove Member: Green siltstones and sandstone.
