= Renews Head Formation =

Geological formation in Canada

- Stratigraphic range: Ediacaran
- Type: Formation
- Unit of: St John's Group
- Underlies: Cappahayden Formation (Near Ferryland); Gibbett Hill Formation (east of St John's)
- Overlies: Fermeuse Formation

Lithology
- Primary: Dark-gray Sandstone
- Other: Minor Shale

Location
- Region: Newfoundland
- Country: Canada
- Outcrop occurrence

The Renews Head Formation is a geologic formation in Newfoundland and Labrador. It preserves fossils dating back to the Ediacaran period.

== Geology ==
The Renews Head Formation is primarily composed of laminated dark-gray silty sandstones which weathers to a rusty-brown, alongside thin to medium-bedded sandstones containing minor black shales throughout. There are also thick, cross-bedded laminated gray sandstones, which are structureless in nature, and are inter-bedded with more black shales and thin sandstones. With this, it has been suggested that these layers were deposited in a delta-front environment.

It is overlain by the Cappahayden Formation near the town of Ferryland, and the Gibbett Hill Formation near the city of St. John's. Meanwhile, the formation is gradationally and conformably underlain by the Fermeuse Formation.

== Paleobiota ==
The Renews Head Formation is home to a small range of discoidal forms, like Aspidella, which have been noted to bear faint radial markings similar to Hiemalora. There are also unnamed Sphaeromorph Acritarchs known from this formation.

Color key
Taxon	Reclassified taxon	Taxon falsely reported as present	Dubious taxon or junior synonym	Ichnotaxon	Ootaxon	Morphotaxon

Notes
Uncertain or tentative taxa are in small text; ~~crossed out~~ taxa are discredited.

=== incertae sedis ===
Genus	Species	Notes	Images
Aspidella	A. terranovica	Enigmatic discoidal fossil. Specimens from this formation have faint Hiemalora-like radial markings.	

=== Microorganisms ===
Genus	Species	Notes	Images
Sphaeromorph Acritarchs	???	Acritarchs.	

== See also ==
- List of fossiliferous stratigraphic units in Newfoundland and Labrador

== Bibliography ==
- Various Contributors to the Paleobiology Database. "Fossilworks: Gateway to the Paleobiology Database". Archived from the original on 19 August 2022.
