= SS Lusitania (1871) =

British ocean liner (1871–1901)

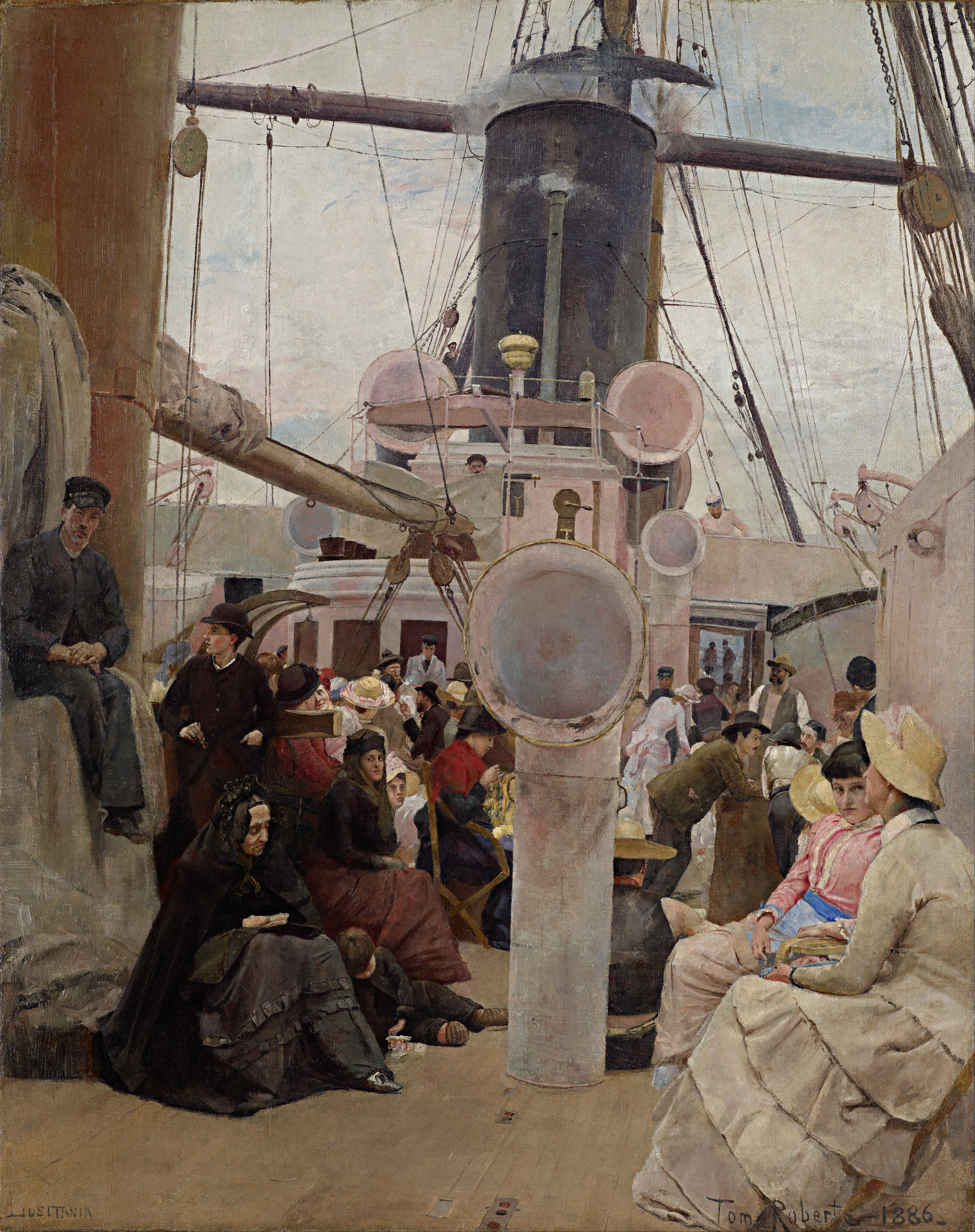
- Painting made on board Lusitania by Australian painter Tom Roberts in 1886.

History

United Kingdom
- Name: SS Lusitania
- Namesake: Lusitania
- Owner: (1901) Elder Dempster Lines Ltd. - African Steamship Co.; (1877-1900) Orient Steam Navigation Company; (1871-1877) Pacific Steam Navigation Co.
- Port of registry: Liverpool, United Kingdom
- Route: (1871-1877) United Kingdom - South America; (1877-1900) United Kingdom - Australia; (1900-1901) United Kingdom - Canada
- Builder: Laird John, Son & Co., Birkenhead
- Cost: £91,852
- Yard number: 381
- Laid down: 1871
- Launched: 20 June 1871
- Completed: September 1871
- Acquired: September 1871
- Maiden voyage: 13 October 1871
- In service: September 1871
- Out of service: 26 June 1901
- Identification: Official number: 65888
- Fate: Ran aground on 26 June 1901
- Notes: Call letters: MNL

General characteristics
- Type: Ocean liner
- Tonnage: 3,912 GRT
- Length: 115.8 metres (379 ft 11 in)
- Beam: 12.6 metres (41 ft 4 in)
- Depth: 10.7 metres (35 ft 1 in)
- Installed power: (1871-1886) One 2 cylinder Compound expansion steam engine; (1886-1901) One triple expansion steam engine
- Propulsion: 1 screw propeller
- Speed: (1871-1886) 12 knots (22 km/h; 14 mph); (1886-1901) 15 knots (28 km/h; 17 mph)
- Capacity: 454 Passengers
- Notes: 3 schooner-rigged masts and 1 funnel

SS Lusitania was a British ocean liner that ran aground at Seal Cove, near Cape Ballard, 25 nautical miles (46 km) North of Cape Race, Newfoundland in the Atlantic Ocean on 26 June 1901, while she was travelling from Liverpool, United Kingdom, to Montreal, Canada, with general cargo.

== Construction ==
Lusitania was launched at the Laird John, Son & Co. shipyard in Birkenhead, England on 20 June 1871, and completed in September 1871 at a cost of £91,852. The ship was 115.8 metres (379 ft 11 in) long, had a beam of 12.6 metres (41 ft 4 in) and a depth of 10.7 metres (35 ft 1 in). She was assessed at 3,912 GRT and had a single 2 cylinder Compound expansion steam engine producing 700 rhp, driving a single screw propeller. The ship could reach a maximum speed of 12 knots (22 km/h; 14 mph) and possessed 3 schooner-rigged masts, one funnel and a clipper stem. As built, she had the capacity to carry 84 First class passengers, 100 Second class passengers and 270 Steerage passengers.

== Early career ==
Lusitania was built for the Pacific Steam Navigation Company and was assigned to sail the United Kingdom - South America route. She conducted her maiden voyage on 13 October 1871 from Liverpool to Valparaíso via Cape Horn without incident. However, on her return trip to the United Kingdom, Lusitania lost three of her four propeller blades shortly after leaving Valparaiso. As no dry-dock was available to repare the ship, a wooden caisson (which measured 7.31 metres (24 ft 0 in) by 7.92 metres (26 ft 0 in)) was built around her stern and subsequently pumped dry. The spare screw was fitted onto Lusitania within two weeks of the incident. The ship continued on her route until she was laid up alongside four other vessels in 1874, as the Pacific Steam Navigation Company reduced their service to South America from once a week to twice a month.

The next chapter in the career of Lusitania occurred in February 1877, when she was chartered by the Orient Steam Navigation Company. Her first voyage under her new owner occurred on 26 June 1877, when she departed Gravesend, England for Melbourne, Australia, sailing via Plymouth and the Cape of Good Hope. Lusitania arrived at her destination on 8 August without incident and made her return voyage to the United Kingdom via the Suez Canal. Australian painter Tom Roberts, made a painting during his voyage on board Lusitania back to Australia in March 1885. The painting depicts a deck scene on board the ship and was named coming south. The work now lies in the National Gallery of Victoria and was featured on a $10 Australian stamp in 1977.

On 17 April 1885, Lusitania was commissioned as an Armed Merchant Cruiser for half a year in Sydney due to the Russian war scare. The ship's fitting out and restoration had cost about £35,505, before she was disarmed and returned to her owners in 1886. Upon her return, she underwent a refit, that saw her 2 cylinder Compound expansion steam engine replaced by a triple expansion steam engine which increased her maximum speed from 12 knots (22 km/h; 14 mph) to 15 knots (28 km/h; 17 mph). Her yards were also removed and her passenger accommodations rebuild, reducing her capacity to carry First class passengers from 84 to 70 and her Second class passengers from 100 to 80.

In the early 1890s, Lusitania was sailing the London - Sydney route with stops in Gibraltar, Naples, Port Said, Suez, Colombo, Albany and Melbourne. She maintained this schedule until she was replaced by the newly built SS Ortona in 1900. That same year on 31 March, Lusitania was sold to Elder Dempster Lines Ltd. serving the Liverpool - Halifax route. The ship was reverted to the Pacific Steam Navigation Company in July 1900, following the sinking of SS Talca, before being returned to Elder Dempster Lines Ltd. in February 1901. At the end of her career, Lusitania was chartered by the Allan Line.

== Sinking ==
Lusitania was on a voyage from Liverpool, United Kingdom to Montreal, Canada under the command of Captain William McNay, carrying general cargo, 6 First class passengers, 15 Second class passengers and 436 Steerage passengers (Almost all Polish and Russian Jews), when she encountered a dense fog on 26 June 1901. At 1.30 am, Lusitania had gone off course and struck a reef at full speed at Seal Cove, near Cape Ballard, 25 nautical miles (46 km) North of Cape Race, Newfoundland. Having run aground, Captain McNay decided not to reverse the engines as to avoid tearing out the bottom of Lusitania on the ocean floor, saving her from foundering. The violent grounding however, had not gone unnoticed by the passengers on board as most were thrown from their beds by the impact, injuring many. According to some newspapers at the time, a panic broke out in which the immigrant Steerage passengers rushed the ship's lifeboats and threatened the crew and women with knives, which took the crew three hours to subdue the violent men before the evacuation could begin. However the official report from the investigation into the incident, concludes that the evacuation commenced without incident. The first boat loaded with women and children was launched at 2.15 am and by 7 am every passenger and crewmember were evacuated and landed on the shore.

By noon, the SS Glencoe had arrived on the scene to pick up all passengers and 93 crewmembers of the Lusitania and bring them to St. John's, Newfoundland, where they arrived at midnight on 27 June. Although no lives were lost during the incident, many were injured during the grounding. Amongst the officers onboard of the Lusitania during the incident was Henry George Kendall, who would become known as the captain of the ill-fated Canadian Pacific Line steamer RMS Empress of Ireland, which sank in 1914 following a collision with a great loss of life.

== Wreck and aftermath ==
Lusitania was quickly deemed a total loss. She lay on the reef at a 28 degree port list with a badly damaged keel, displaced engine and her cargo holds had already flooded. This made salvaging the ship's cargo very challenging, requiring divers and good weather to be able to recover it. On 1 July 1901, the owners of Lusitania sold her hull for $1,500 and the ship was scrapped in situ. Meanwhile, Captain McNay stood trial at the marine court on 5 July 1901 as an investigation into the loss of Lusitania was conducted. The court ruled that the disaster was due to an unknown and erratic current which threw the ship 21 nautical miles (39 km) off course and thereby acquitted the captain of any wrongdoing, restoring his captain's certificate as well.
