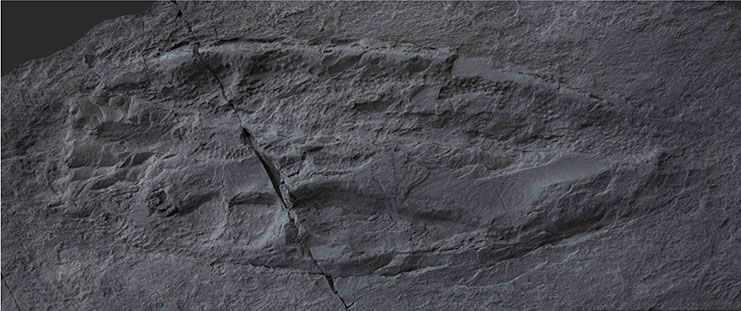
- A jesmonite cast of the Lydonia jiggamintia holotype fossil

Scientific classification
- Kingdom: Animalia
- Phylum: incertae sedis
- Genus: †Lydonia; Pasinetti et al., 2025
- Species: †L. jiggamintia

Binomial name
- †Lydonia jiggamintia Pasinetti et al., 2025

= Lydonia (genus) =

Lydonia Temporal range: late Ediacaran ~565–560 Ma

Extinct sponge-like organism from the Ediacaran

Lydonia is an extinct animal from the late Ediacaran of Newfoundland and Labrador, with possible affinities to Porifera. Specimens are ovate in shape, and is a monotypic genus, containing only Lydonia jiggamintia.

== Discovery ==
The holotype material for Lydonia was found on the Johnson Discovery Surface, from the Trepassey Formation, of the Catalina Dome on the Bonavista Peninsula, Newfoundland, Canada in 2008 and originally referred to the ichnotaxon Blackbrookia, but was re-described and formally named in 2025.

== Etymology ==
The generic name Lydonia is in honour of the punk rock musician John Lydon (Formally known as Johnny Rotten), due to the possible spiky, hair-like appearance it may have had in life. The specific name jiggamintia derives from the Latinised Beothuk word "jiggamint", to mean "gooseberry", a type of spiky currant.

== Description ==
Lydonia jiggamintia is an ovate to obovate organism, growing up to 53 cm (20.9 in) in length, which is covered in small 5 mm (0.2 in) wide pores, which gives off a mesh-like appearance. The body itself, which is rounded and one end and pointed at the other, has a notable rim around its margin, and is symmetrical along its longest axis, with a longitudinal fold going down this long axis. The pores themselves may have been open in life with raised rims. The pores are not evenly distributed over the body in any decipherable pattern, but are all vaguely spaced around 5 mm (0.2 in) from each other.

Lydonia may have also been inflated, as evidenced by its wrinkled fossil material, showing it may have a collapsed during burial, with a single specimen also featuring a noted bulging in the middle, perhaps hinting at a thicker middle, which thinned out towards the margins.

== Paleoecology ==
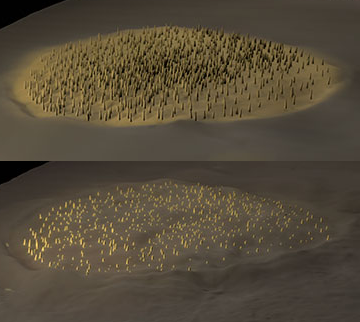
The two different reconstructed lifestyles of Lydonia jiggamintia. The top image is it as an epifaunal organism, and the bottom one as a semi-faunal organism.

Lydonia was most likely either a sessile benthic or semi-infaunal organism in life, being covered by microbial matground, and may have colonised other macro-organisms in the general area. It has been noted that Lydonia is currently only known from surfaces that feature an abundance of Fractofusus, but this does not show any taxonomic relations. Its general mode of life and morphology has been noted to be similar to the extant demosponge Polymastia.

The morphology of Lydonia, one end being bulbous whilst the other is pointed, may be due to it adapting to the directional palaeocurrents, by having more surface area whilst not increasing the chance of the organism being dragged along or lifted by said palaeocurrent, and aiding in filter feeding. It may have also grown or encrusted over other organisms, altering how it may have looked from above.

== See also ==
- List of Ediacaran genera
