= Avalofractus =

Avalofractus Temporal range: 570–565 Ma Ediacaran

Scientific classification
- Kingdom: Animalia
- Phylum: †Petalonamae
- Clade: †Rangeomorpha
- Genus: †Avalofractus; Narbonne et al., 2009
- Species: †A. abaculus

Binomial name
- †Avalofractus abaculus Narbonne et al., 2009

Extinct genus of invertebrates

Avalofractus abaculus is a frond-like rangeomorph fossil described from the Ediacaran of the Trepassey Formation, Spaniard's Bay, Newfoundland.

== Morphology ==
Avalofractus displays a strongly fractal body shape, with four levels of nearly perfectly self-similar, pinnate, alternate branches. It was about 5 cm long on average, with a 1 cm-diameter holdfast at the base of the frond. The stem length is from 1/3 to 1/2 that of the whole frond. It is quite similar to Rangea, even if with distinct morphological differences that justify the creation of a new genus (e.g. absence of subsidiary quilts, frond elements free to rotate independently instead of being attached to each other by a membrane).

A 2017 analysis of Avalofractus fossils found that the growth of the animal and its morphology was dependent on the amount of nutrient, suggesting that the phenotype of Ediacaran organisms was flexible in response to environmental conditions.

== Distribution ==
In contrast with other rangeomorphs, which have wide distributions, Avalofractus seems to have been an endemic species, being known only from the Spaniard's Bay deposits.

== Reproduction ==
It has been suggested that Avalofractus could have been capable of vegetative reproduction: loose fronds could have detached and grow, rather like a plant cutting. This could explain the mysterious lack of independent rangeomorph fronds smaller than 10 mm in the fossil record.

A previous suggestion that Avalofractus younger individuals were encased in a sheath-like structure has been later dismissed.

== See also ==
- List of Ediacaran genera
