= Flat Rock Cove Formation =

Geological formation in Newfoundland, Canada

- Stratigraphic range: Ediacaran
- Type: Formation
- Unit of: Signal Hill Group
- Sub-units: Knobby Hill and Piccos Brook Members
- Overlies: Cuckold Formation; (Unconformably) Drook Formation

Lithology
- Primary: Conglomerate
- Other: Siltstone, Breccia, Sandstone

Location
- Region: Newfoundland
- Country: Canada

Type section
- Named for: Flat Rock
- Occurrence of the Flat Rock Cove Formation in southeastern Newfoundland

The Flat Rock Cove Formation is an Ediacaran aged formation cropping out in Newfoundland.

== Geology ==
The Flat Rock Cove Formation is dominated by sedimentary rocks, such as siltstone. Whilst is conformably overlies the Cuckold Formation, in the Flat Rock area, the formation also unconformably overlies the Drook Formation from the Conception Group, which is notably deformed in this area.

=== Members ===
It has two members, which are as follows, in ascending stratigraphic order (lowest to highest):

- Knobby Hill Member: This member is the thickest of the two, and is predominately composed of gray conglomerates and siltstones.
- Piccos Brook Member: This member is the thinner of the two, and is primarily composed of breccia which is locally derived, and red muddy sandstone.
