= Cappahayden Formation =

Geological formation in Newfoundland, Canada

- Stratigraphic range: Ediacaran
- Type: Formation
- Unit of: Signal Hill Group
- Underlies: Gibbett Hill Formation
- Overlies: Renews Head Formation

Lithology
- Primary: Gray Siltstone

Location
- Region: Newfoundland
- Country: Canada
- Occurrence of the Cappahayden Formation in southeastern Newfoundland

The Cappahayden Formation is an Ediacaran formation cropping out in Newfoundland. It comprises fine grey sandstones/siltstones with very fine black parallel laminations, rarely with crossbedding.
