= Blackhead Formation =

Geologic formation in Newfoundland, Canada

- Stratigraphic range: Ediacaran
- Type: Formation
- Unit of: Signal Hill Group
- Sub-units: [Unnamed]; Maddox Cove Member; [Unnamed]; Deadman's Bay member; [Unnamed]
- Overlies: Cuckold Formation

Lithology
- Primary: Sandstone
- Other: Siltstone, Shale, Mudstone

Location
- Region: Newfoundland and Labrador
- Country: Canada
- Outcrop area in southeast Newfoundland

The Blackhead Formation is an Ediacaran aged geological formation cropping out in Eastern Newfoundland.

== Geology ==
The Blackhead formation is predominately composed of red and gray sandstones, shales, and siltstones. The formation is also divided into five subdivisions, two of which are named, the Maddox Cove and Deadman's Bay members.
