= Pectinifrons =

Pectinifrons Temporal range: late Ediacaran ~565–550.78 Ma
- Life restoration of Pectinifrons abyssalis. Note the comb shape of its body.

Scientific classification
- Kingdom: Animalia
- Phylum: †Petalonamae
- Clade: †Rangeomorpha
- Genus: †Pectinifrons; Bamforth, Narbonne & Anderson, 2008
- Species: †P. abyssalis

Binomial name
- †Pectinifrons abyssalis Bamforth, Narbonne & Anderson, 2008

Extinct genus of rangeomorph

Pectinifrons is an extinct rangeomorph from the Ediacaran of Newfoundland and Labrador. It has a notably comb-like appearance, and is a monotypic genus, containing only Pectinifrons abyssalis.

== Discovery ==
The holotype specimen and three additional paratypes of Pectinifrons were found on the Mistaken Point North surface in the Mistaken Point Formation, Conception Group in Newfoundland, Canada in 1969, being referred to as a "Spindle-shaped organism with branches on one side of midline", and was then formally described and named in 2008.

== Etymology ==
The generic name Pectinifrons derives from the Latin word "pecten", to mean "comb", in reference to the appearance of the organism; and "frons", to mean "leafy branches", in reference to the appearance of the branches. The specific name abyssalis derives also from a Latin word, "abyssi", to mean "from the deep sea".

Combined, the full name translates to "Comb of leafy branches from the deep sea".

== Description ==
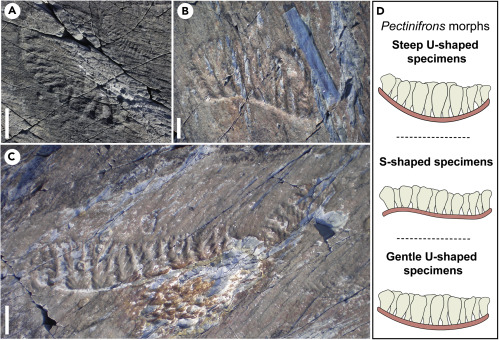
The three known morphotypes of Pectinifrons abyssalis.

Pectinifrons abyssalis is a comb-like rangeomorph, with the notably curved central stalk getting up to 62 cm (24.4 in) in length, and 9 mm (0.4 in) wide. This central stalk has twenty-two branches, which are all perpendicular to the stalk itself, averaging at around 11 m (36.1 ft) in width, and are evenly spaced by 18 mm (0.7 in). The branches also range from 101 mm (4.0 in) in length at the centre of the stalk, to 63 mm (2.5 in) in length at the distal ends, averaging at around 72 mm (2.8 in) in length overall, and were also positioned alternating on either side of the central stalk in life, inferred from fossils showing one side with clear attachment points, and the other being obscured by the stalk itself. There are also three known morphotypes of the central stalk, U-Shaped specimens, S-Shaped specimens and Gentle U-Shaped specimens.

In more well preserved specimens that are also external moulds, the branches are revealed to be small frondlets on a smaller, rigid strut. The smaller branches in the frondlets are also noted to be unconstrained, with no preserved marginal rim or a connection point with other branches. It has also been noted that some better preserved specimens have well preserved inner frondlets, whilst the outer sets are not as well preserved, sometimes to the point of not preserving any discernable rangeomorph features.

== History of research ==
Pectinifrons was most likely first referenced in 1969, by S.B. Misra as "Spindle-shaped organism with branches on one side of midline", although this is tentative as the only figured specimen is that of Fractofusus, but it is noted that he may still have regarded these forms as being distinct from Fractofusus.

In both 1978 and 1982, the specimens of Pectinifrons were further described, although still not named, being informally noted as "Pectinate Form", but were confirmed to definitely be a unique form separate from Fractofusus. This was when the comb-like structure of the organism was also properly first described, along with the suggestion that the central stalk had open apertures and either distal end. Although a decade later in 1992, this was refuted, and it was noted that the primary stalk of the now "Pectinate organism" was not open ended, but instead a rigid central stalk that supported the smaller leaf-like struts, along with a new proposal that the central stalk was attached to the substrate via a central shaft, although the 2008 paper describing Pectinifrons noted this central shaft could not be found in any known fossil material, and as such was discounted.

Shortly before its formal description, in 2002, the life-mode of what was then called the "Pectinate" was thought to be of a mid-level suspension feeder, alongside organisms such as Bradgatia and Thectardis, although this was later discounted in 2023.

== Taphonomy ==
All fossil specimens of Pectinifrons display Conception-style preservation, which is where the felled organism is immediately covered in a layer of volcanic ash, and then quickly lithifying to create a mould of the outer surface of the entrapped organism. The frondlets of Pectinifrons have three modes of preservation, which are as follows:

- Morphotype 1:

This is where the rangeomorph frondlets are completely degraded, only leaving behind the stronger central strut the frondlets were attached to.

- Morphotype 2:

This is where the rangeomorph frondlets are partially degraded, leaving behind a few frondlets attached to the stronger central strut.

- Morphotype 3:

This is where the rangeomorph frondlets are fully preserved, completely covering the stronger central strut, and is the rarest of the three morphotypes.

This reveals that the curved central stalk and smaller struts were composed of a stronger, rigid, and more resistant material, being able to maintain its structure even after burial, allowing the stalks and struts to be preserved as positive relief. There have been some fossils found where the stalk has collapsed, leaving behind an external mould of the lower side of the organism. The aforementioned Morphotype 3 is also only known from this external mould preservation, showing that the frondlets were made of a less resistant material than the central stalk and struts.

== Ecology ==
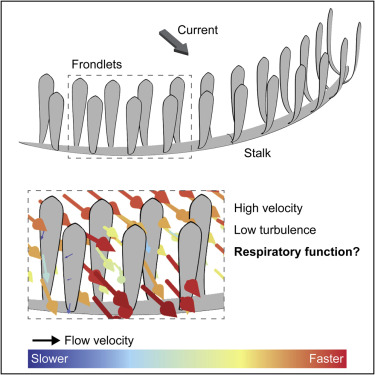
Visualisation of the speed of the current and flow through the frondlets of Pectinifrons abyssalis.

The life mod of Pectinifrons has been inferred from the way it has been preserved, being found on top of mudstone beds and beneath volcanic ash, suggesting the organism may have lived epifaunally before burial. This is further supported by other organisms known from the surrounding area, where their preservation degrades further away from the central stalk. From this, it has been inferred and supported that Pectinifrons, like all petalonamids, was a mid-level filter-feeder or a nutrient absorber, picking up and absorbing nutrients through its frondlets from the surrounding water as it passed by. Although later studies that have used computational fluid dynamics tests have discounted the filter-feeding lifestyle, due to the unique patterns seen in the water flow around the frondlets, and notes that while the feeding mode of Pectinifrons now remains unknown, the fronds or frondlets of rangeomorphs may have been adapted for oxygen uptake and gas exchange instead.

It has also been noted that on some surfaces, Pectinifrons is the main dominate organism, whilst on others it is not. This is further supported by the fact that some of the largest forms are known from the dominated surfaces, whilst the smaller ones are found on the surfaces were they are less common in number. This has inferred that the dominated surface is that of an "old-growth forest", containing the most mature cohort, with the other surfaces showing younger specimens, with one surface showing the youngest cohort, possibly not long after a "spatfall", something that is seen in extant molluscs, and is suggested may be a form of reproductive strategy that some Ediacaran organisms evolved. As for how it grew, it has been noted that smaller specimens have less frondlets, whilst the larger and longer specimens have more, showing that Pectinifrons may have grown by the simple addition of new frondlets at each distal end of the central stalk as it grew longer.

== Distribution ==
Specimens of Pectinifrons have been found from the Mistaken Point Formation, as well as the overlying Trepassey Formation. They are also known from the White Sea assemblage aged rocks of the Inner Meadow site, dated to 550 million years ago, extending the previously known age range of Pectinifrons.

== See also ==
- List of Ediacaran genera
