= Ferryland Head Formation =

Formation cropping in Newfoundland

- Stratigraphic range: Ediacaran
- Type: Formation
- Unit of: Signal Hill Group
- Sub-units: High Rocks Member
- Underlies: Cape Ballard Formation
- Overlies: Gibbett Hill Formation

Lithology
- Primary: Gray Sandstone
- Other: Minor Conglomerate and Shale

Location
- Region: Newfoundland
- Country: Canada
- Occurrence of the Ferryland Head Formation in southeastern Newfoundland

The Ferryland Head Formation is an Ediacaran formation cropping out in Newfoundland. It mostly consists of gray sandstones, with minor conglomerates.

It has only one member, the High Rocks Member, which consists of shales and red bedded sandstone.
