= Connecting Point Group =

Archaeological formation in Newfoundland, Canada

- Stratigraphic range: Ediacaran
- Type: Group
- Sub-units: Not subdivided
- Underlies: Musgravetown Group
- Overlies: Love Cove Group

Location
- Region: Newfoundland
- Country: Canada
- Occurrence of Connecting Point Group in southeastern Newfoundland

The Connecting Point Group is a Late Neoproterozoic geological formation cropping out on the Avalon Peninsula of Newfoundland, dominated by deep marine turbidite deposits.

Approximate age data from the middle of the group date it to ca. 610 Ma.

It corresponds to the Conception Group and the St. John's Group further east on the Avalon peninsula
