= Quidi Vidi Formation =

- Stratigraphic range: Ediacaran
- Type: Formation
- Unit of: Signal Hill Group
- Underlies: Cuckold Formation
- Overlies: Gibbett Hill Formation

Lithology
- Primary: Red-green Sandstone
- Other: Pebble Conglomerate and Mudstone

Location
- Region: Newfoundland and Labrador
- Country: Canada
- Outcrop occurrence in southeast Newfoundland

Quidi Vidi Formation is an Ediacaran stratigraphic unit consisting of red-green sandstones and minor pebble conglomerates deposited on an alluvial plain.
