= Love Cove Group =

- Stratigraphic range: 620 Ma
- Occurrence of the Love Cove Group in southeastern Newfoundland
- Type: Group
- Underlies: Connecting Point Group

Lithology
- Primary: Volcaniclastics

Location
- Region: Newfoundland
- Country: Canada

The Love Cove Group is a metamorphosed volcaniclastic sedimentary group cropping out in southeastern Newfoundland. Strata from towards the middle of the formation have been dated to 620 ± 1 million years ago.
