= St. John's Group =

St John's Group
- Stratigraphic range: Ediacaran (post-565 Ma)
- Type: Group
- Unit of: Connecting Point Group
- Sub-units: Renews Head Formation; Fermeuse Formation; (Other members?); Back Cove Member; Trepassey Formation; Port Union Member; Catalina Member
- Underlies: Signal Hill Group
- Overlies: Conception Group

Lithology
- Primary: Shale

Location
- Region: Newfoundland and Labrador
- Country: Canada
- Occurrence of St. John's Group in the bedrock of Newfoundland

The St John's Group is a fossiliferous shale-dominated Ediacaran geologic group in Newfoundland and Labrador, younger than 565 ± 3 million years ago.

It corresponds to the upper portion of the Connecting Point Group

== See also ==
- List of fossiliferous stratigraphic units in Newfoundland and Labrador
