= Cambrian substrate revolution =

Diversification of animal burrowing

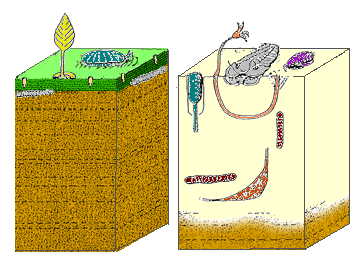
Before and after the Cambrian substrate revolution

The Cambrian substrate revolution or "Agronomic revolution" is a rapid transition of the sea floor substrates from thick, organic microbial mats to exposed inorganic sediments during the early Cambrian period, as evidenced in trace fossils. It coincided with the diversification of burrowing benthic animals (endobenthos) during the Cambrian explosion.

Before this "widening of the behavioural repertoire", bottom-dwelling organism were mainly sessile filter feeders and relatively sedentary microbivores who grazed upon the then-abundant "mats" of microbial biofilms that overlaid the seabed (like how modern aquatic gastropods still do), who more or less cohabitated among each other peacefully during the Ediacaran period, analogized by Mark McMenamin as a "Garden of Ediacara". These microbial mats formed an organic barrier between the water column and the sediments overlying lithosphere underneath, which was less water-logged than modern sea floors and was almost completely anoxic (lacking in oxygen). The substrate was inhabited by anaerobic sulfate-reducing bacteria, whose emissions of hydrogen sulfide (H_{2}S) made the substrate toxic to most other organisms.

Around the start of the Cambrian, metazoan organisms (particularly ichnogenic bilaterians) began to burrow vertically, forming a great diversity of different fossilizable burrow forms and traces as they penetrated the sediments for protection or to feed. These burrowing animals broke down and weakened the microbial mats, causing water and oxygen to penetrate a considerable distance below the mats. This restricted the sulfate-reducing bacteria and their H_{2}S emissions to the deeper layers, and oxygen, toxic to the anaerobes, began inhibiting and gradually shrinking the size of the microbial colonies. The upper level of the sea-floor became wetter and softer as the microbial was constantly hollowed and thinned by the burrowing, making it habitable for a much wider range of organisms, including many colonies of algae who produced oxygen via photosynthetic water splitting to further degrade the existing microbial mats.

The Cambrian degradation of the microbial mats had exerted on the benthic communities a selective pressure that favored organisms with better motility (which allowed them to venture farther for foraging), bioerosion (which allowed them to burrow deeper and forage in harder substrates) and tougher skeletons/mouthparts (which allowed robust locomotion and also predation). The rise of predation as a form of interspecific competition had triggered an evolutionary arms race and forced many species to avoid predators by burrowing, further accelerating the depletion of the microbial mats.

== Burrowing before the Cambrian ==
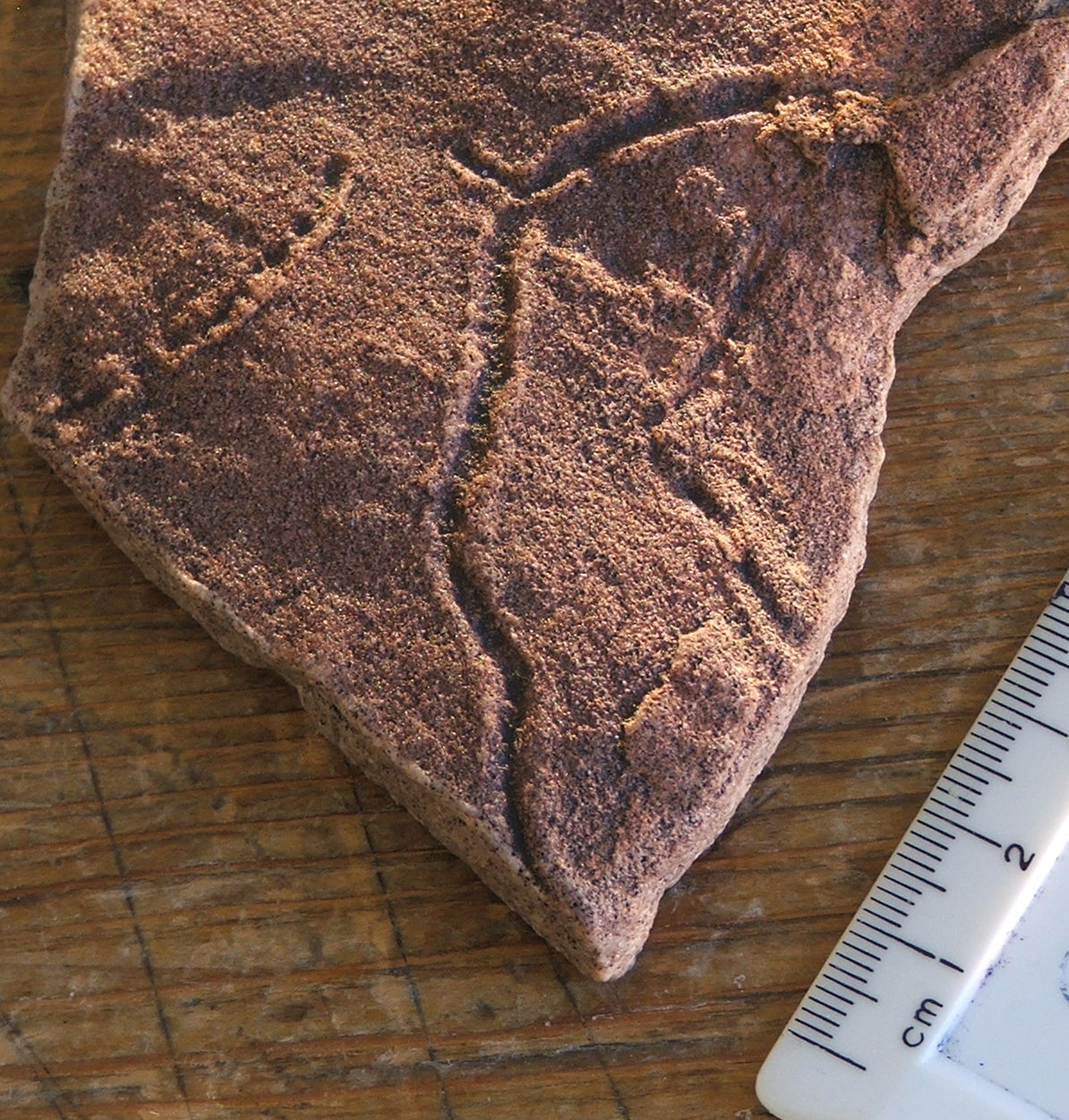
An Ediacaran trace fossil, made when an organism burrowed below a microbial mat

The traces of organisms moving on and directly underneath the microbial mats that covered the Ediacaran sea floor are preserved from the Ediacaran period, about 565 million years ago. The only Ediacaran burrows are horizontal, on or just below the surface, and were made by animals which fed above the surface, but burrowed to hide from predators. If these burrows are biogenic (made by organisms) they imply the presence of motile organisms with heads, which would probably have been bilaterians (bilaterally symmetrical animals). Putative "burrows" dating as far back as 1,100 million years may have been made by animals that fed on the undersides of microbial mats, which would have shielded them from a chemically unpleasant ocean; however, their uneven width and tapering ends make it difficult to believe that they were made by living organisms, and the original author has suggested that the menisci of burst bubbles are more likely to have created the marks he observed. The Ediacaran burrows found so far imply simple behaviour, and the complex, efficient feeding traces common from the start of the Cambrian are absent.

Some simple pre-Cambrian horizontal traces could have been produced by large single-celled organisms; equivalent traces are produced by protists today.

== The early Cambrian diversification of burrow forms ==
From the very start of the Cambrian period (about 538.8 million years ago) many new types of traces first appear, including well-known vertical burrows such as Diplocraterion and Skolithos, and traces normally attributed to arthropods, such as Cruziana and Rusophycus. The vertical burrows indicate that worm-like animals acquired new behaviours, and possibly new physical capabilities. Some Cambrian trace fossils indicate that their makers possessed hard (although not necessarily mineralised) exoskeletons.

It's important to make a distinction between burrowing that introduces oxygen into the sediment – bioirrigation – and those that simply move sediment grains around – biomixing. The latter can actually reduce the amount of oxygen available in the sediment, by bringing organic material down to depths where it will be anaerobically respired. In ichnodiversity terms, the same proportions of these two modes (predominantly biomixing) are seen on each side of the Ediacaran-Cambrian boundary – even if bioirrigation occurrences become relatively more frequent in the Terreneuvian.

== Advantages of burrowing ==
=== Feeding ===
Many organisms burrow to obtain food, either in the form of other burrowing organisms, or organic matter. The remains of planktonic organisms sink to the sea floor, providing a source of nutrition; if these organics are mixed into the sediment they can be fed upon. However, it is possible that before the Cambrian, plankton were too small to sink, so there was no supply of organic carbon to the sea floor. However, it appears that organisms did not feed upon the sediment itself until after the Cambrian.

=== Anchorage ===
An advantage to living within the substrate would be protection from being washed away by currents.

=== Protection ===
Organisms also burrow to avoid predation. Predatory behaviour first appeared over 1 billion years ago, but predation on large organisms appears to have first become significant shortly before the start of the Cambrian. Precambrian burrows served a protective function, as the animals that made them fed above the surface; they evolved at the same time as other organisms began forming mineralised skeletons.

== Enabling burrowing ==
Microbial mats formed a blanket, cutting off the underlying sediments from the ocean water above. This meant that the sediments were anoxic, and hydrogen sulfide (H_{2}S) was abundant. The free exchange of the pore waters with oxygenated ocean water was essential to make the sediments habitable. This exchange was made possible by the action of minute animals: Too small to produce burrows of their own, this meiofauna inhabited the spaces between sand grains in the microbial mats. Their bioturbation – movement that dislodged grains and disturbed the resistant biomats – broke the mats up, allowing water and chemicals above and below to mix.

== Effects of the revolution ==
The Cambrian substrate revolution was a long and patchy process that proceeded at different rates in different locations throughout much of the Cambrian.

=== Effects on ecosystems ===
After the agronomic revolution, the microbial mats that had covered the Ediacaran sea floor became increasingly restricted to a limited range of environments:

- Very harsh environments, such as hyper-saline lagoons or brackish estuaries, which were uninhabitable for the burrowing organisms that broke up the mats.
- Rocky substrates which the burrowers could not penetrate.
- The depths of the oceans, where burrowing activity today is at a similar level to that in the shallow coastal seas before the revolution.

The first burrowers probably fed on the microbial mats, while burrowing underneath them for protection; this burrowing led to the downfall of the mats they were feeding on.

Before the revolution, bottom dwelling organisms fell into four categories:

- "mat encrusters", which were permanently attached to the mat;
- "mat scratchers", which grazed the surface of the mat without destroying it;
- "mat stickers", suspension feeders that were partially embedded in the mat; and
- "undermat miners", which burrowed underneath the mat and fed on decomposing mat material.

The "undermat miners" appear to have died out by the middle of the Cambrian period. "Mat encrusters" and "mat stickers" either died out or developed more secure anchors that were specialised for soft or hard substrates. "Mat scratchers" were restricted to rocky substrates and the depths of the oceans, where both they and the mats could survive.

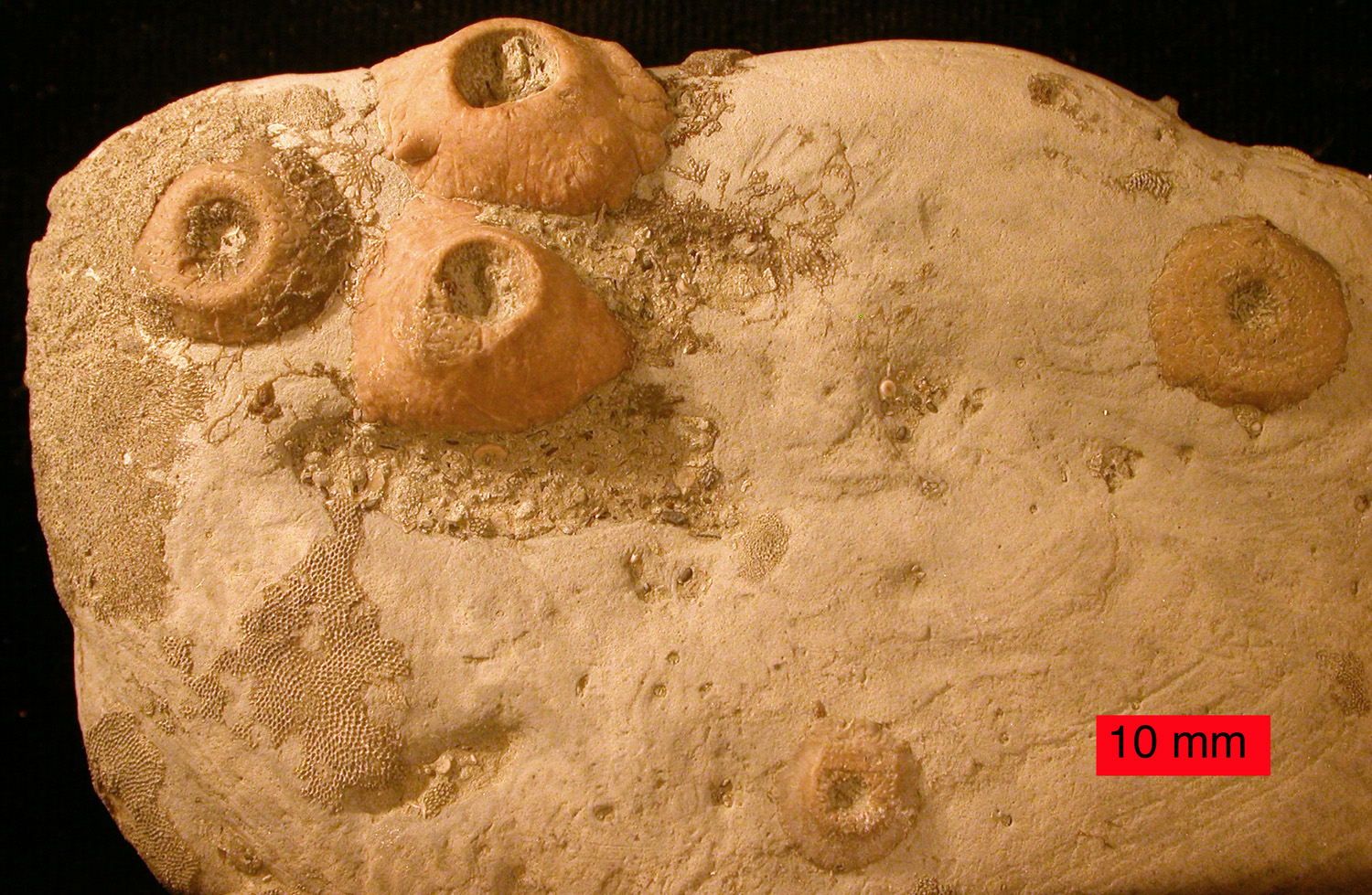
Crinoid holdfasts on a hard substrate from the Upper Ordovician of northern Kentucky

Early sessile echinoderms were mostly "mat stickers". The helicoplacoids failed to adapt to the new conditions and died out; the edrioasteroids and eocrinoids survived by developing holdfasts for attachment to hard substrates, and stalks that raised their feeding apparatus above most of the debris that burrowers stirred up in the looser sea-floors. Mobile echinoderms (stylophorans, homosteleans, homoiosteleans, and ctenocystoids) were not significantly affected by the substrate revolution.

Early molluscs appear to have grazed on microbial mats, so it is natural to hypothesize that grazing molluscs were also restricted to areas where the mats could survive. The earliest known fossils of monoplacophoran ("single-plated") molluscs date from the Early Cambrian, where they grazed on microbial mats. Most modern monoplacophorans live on soft substrates in deep parts of the seas, although one genus lives on hard substrates at the edges of continental shelves. Unfortunately, the oldest known fossils of polyplacophorans (molluscs with multiple shell plates) are from the Late Cambrian, when the substrate revolution had significantly changed marine environments. Since they are found with stromatolites (stubby pillars built by some types of microbial mat colony), it is thought that polyplacophorans grazed on microbial mats. Modern polyplacophorans mainly graze on mats on rocky coastlines, although a few live in the deep sea. No fossils have been found of aplacophorans (shell-less molluscs), which are generally regarded as the most primitive living molluscs. Some burrow into the sea-floors of deep waters, feeding on micro-organisms and detritus; others live on reefs and eat coral polyps.

=== Palaeontological significance ===
The revolution put an end to the conditions which allowed exceptionally preserved fossil beds or lagerstätten such as the Burgess Shale to be formed. The direct consumption of carcasses was relatively unimportant in reducing fossilisation, compared to changes in sediments' chemistry, porosity, and microbiology, which made it difficult for the chemical gradients necessary for soft-tissue mineralisation to develop. Just like microbial mats, environments which could produce this mode of fossilisation became increasingly restricted to harsher and deeper areas, where burrowers could not establish a foothold; as time progressed, the extent of burrowing increased sufficiently to effectively make this mode of preservation impossible. Post-Cambrian lagerstätten of this nature are typically found in very unusual environments.

The rise in burrowing is of further significance, for burrows provide firm evidence of complex organisms; they are also much more readily preserved than body fossils, to the extent that the absence of trace fossils has been used to imply the genuine absence of large, motile bottom-dwelling organisms. This furthers palaeontologists' understanding of the early Cambrian, and provides an additional line of evidence to show that the Cambrian explosion represents a real diversification, and is not a preservational artefact - even if its timing did not coincide directly with the Agronomic revolution.

The rise of burrowing represents such a fundamental change to the ecosystem, that the appearance of the complex burrow Treptichnus pedum is used to mark the base of the Cambrian period.

=== Geochemical significance ===
The increased level of bioturbation meant that sulfur, which is steadily supplied to the oceanic system from volcanoes and river runoff, was more readily oxidised - rather than being rapidly buried and sitting in its reduced form (sulfide), burrowing organisms continually exposed it to oxygen, allowing it to be oxidised to sulfate. This activity is suggested to account for a sudden rise in sulfate concentration observed near the base of the Cambrian; this can be recorded in the geochemical record both by using δ^{34}S isotopic tracers, and by quantifying the abundance of the sulfate mineral gypsum.

== See also ==
- Matground
