= Cuckold Formation =

Stratigraphic unit in Canada

- Stratigraphic range: Ediacaran
- Type: Formation
- Unit of: Signal Hill Group
- Underlies: Blackhead Formation; Flat Rock Cove Formation
- Overlies: Quidi Vidi Formation

Lithology
- Primary: Red pebble-cobble Conglomerate
- Other: Sandstone

Location
- Region: Newfoundland and Labrador
- Country: Canada

The Cuckold Formation is a stratigraphic unit of the Ediacaran Signal Hill Group, cropping out on eastern Newfoundland; it comprises red pebble to cobble conglomerates and sandstones.
