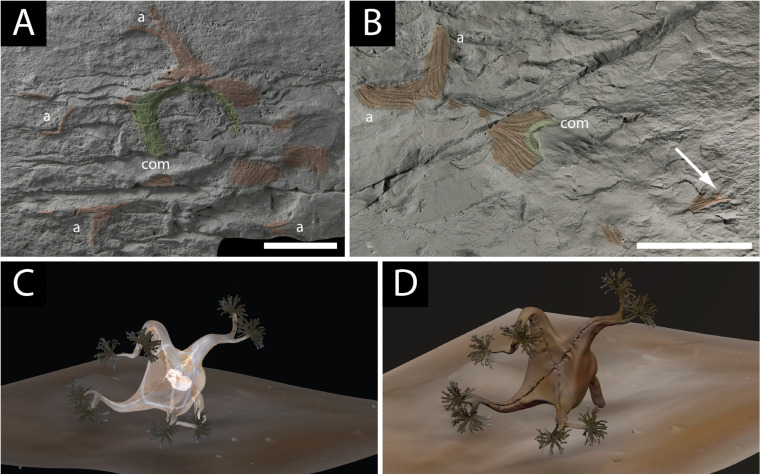
- Fossil material (A, B) and reconstructions (C, D)

Scientific classification
- Kingdom: Animalia
- Phylum: Cnidaria
- Class: Staurozoa
- Genus: †Mamsetia; McIlroy et al., 2024
- Species: †M. manunis

Binomial name
- †Mamsetia manunis McIlroy et al., 2024

= Mamsetia =

Mamsetia Temporal range: late Ediacaran 565 Ma

Species of Ediacaran cnidarian

Mamsetia is an extinct monospecific genus of cnidarian from the late Ediacaran. Estimated to have lived around 565 million years ago, M. manunis is identified as a cnidarian polyp, and represents some of the earliest known evidence for muscle tissue in an animal. Its fossil was discovered in 2014 from Newfoundland in eastern Canada, and was formally described in 2024 as a staurozoan based on examination of its overall morphology and structure.

== Discovery and name ==
The now-holotype fossil of Mamsetia was originally the paratype fossil for Haootia from the Trepassey Formation of Green Island, Bonavista Peninsula in Newfoundland. However, with the publication of a new paper in 2024 placing Haootia as a staurozoan, it was discovered that the paratype had enough differences in its morphology to that of Haootia to erect a new genus.

The generic name Mamsetia is derived from the Beothuk word Mamset, meaning "living". The specific name manunis is derived from the Beothuk word Manune or Manume, meaning "pitcher/cup", relating to the cup-like shape of the body.

== Description ==
Mamsetia manunis is the second animal that has been discovered which consists of bundles of fibres that have been identified as muscles, similar to Haootia. The entire body is in a broadly four-fold symmetrical arrangement, thus the overall body organisation and muscle fibres conforms to the key features of modern staurozoan cnidarians. The fibres, which are similar in pattern to parallelly arranged muscle fibres, extend laterally across the body, linking adjacent corners. The fibres extend beyond each corner to form 4 elongate branches, which divide into smaller dichotomous branches. Smaller branches also arise from the lateral margins of the quadrate body, and also form dichotomously branched fibres. Unlike Haootia, which has 8 primary branches and an open calyx, Mamsetia only bears 4 primary branches and a closed calyx.

== See also ==
- List of Ediacaran genera
