= Signal Hill Group =

Siliciclastic group of marine Ediacaran strata

- Stratigraphic range: Ediacaran
- Occurrence of the Signal Hill Group in southeastern Newfoundland
- Type: Group
- Sub-units: In north Avalon: Blackhead Formation / Flat Rock Cove Formation; Cuckold Formation; Quidi Vidi Formation; Gibbett Hill Formation; In south Avalon: Cape Ballard Formation; Ferryland Head Formation; Gibbett Hill Formation; Cappahayden Formation
- Underlies: Adeyton Group (unconformably)
- Overlies: St. John's Group (conformably)

Location
- Region: Newfoundland
- Country: Canada

The Signal Hill Group is a siliciclastic Group of marine Ediacaran strata, cropping out in Newfoundland, in the eastern Bonavista Peninsula and the eastern Avalon peninsula.

It corresponds temporally to the Musgravetown Group further west.
