= Matground =

Surface layers of seabed-hardening bacterial fauna

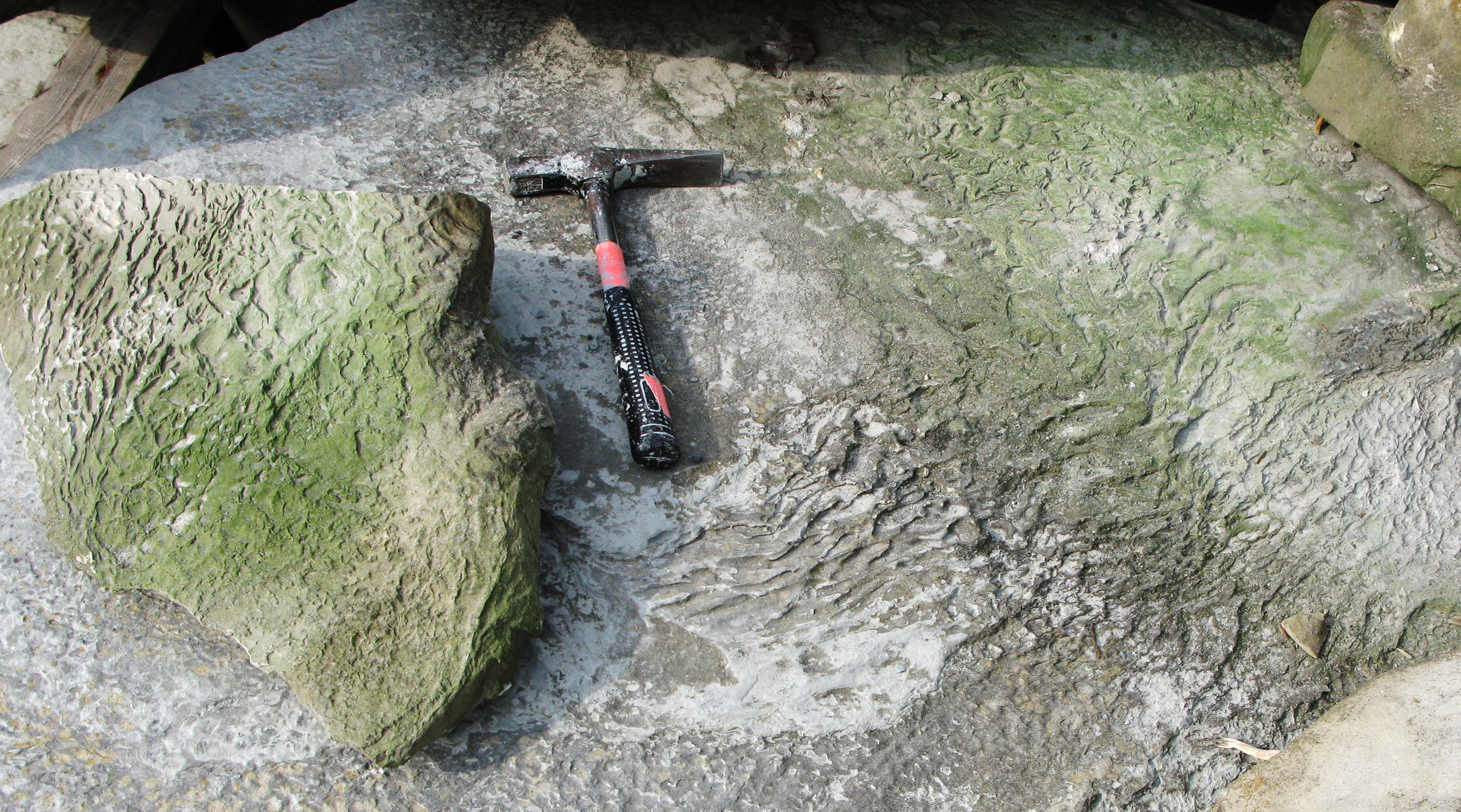
An example of what prehistoric microbial matgrounds may have looked like. The wrinkled "elephant skin" texture is seen throughout most Precambrian sediments.

Matgrounds are strong surface layers of seabed-hardening bacterial fauna preserved in the Proterozoic and lower Cambrian. Wrinkled matgrounds are informally named "elephant skin" because of their wrinkled surface in the fossil record. Matgrounds supported themselves until early burrowing worms were ubiquitous enough to unharden them. Burrowing animals broke down the hardy mats to further penetrate the underlying sediment for protection and feeding. Once matgrounds disappeared, exceptional preservation of lagerstätten such as the Burgess Shale or Ediacara Hills also did so. Trace fossils such as Treptichnus are evidence for soft-bodied burrowers more anatomically complex than the Ediacaran biota that also caused the matgrounds' disappearance.

== See also ==
- Cambrian substrate revolution
