= Cape Ballard Formation =

Geological formation in Newfoundland, Canada

- Stratigraphic range: Ediacaran
- Type: Formation
- Unit of: Signal Hill Group
- Overlies: Ferryland Head Formation

Lithology
- Primary: Gray Sandstone
- Other: Quartz-granule Conglomerate, Gray and Purple Shale, Siltstone

Location
- Region: Newfoundland
- Country: Canada
- Occurrence of the Cape Ballard Formation in southeastern Newfoundland

The Cape Ballard Formation is an Ediacaran formation cropping out in Newfoundland. It consists of two sections, the upper section being formed of thickly bedded gray sandstones and quartz-granule conglomerates, and the lower section formed of gray and purple shales, and siltstones.
