= Spaniard's Bay (bay) =

Natural bay in Newfoundland and Labrador, Canada

Coordinates: 47.633°N 53.214°W

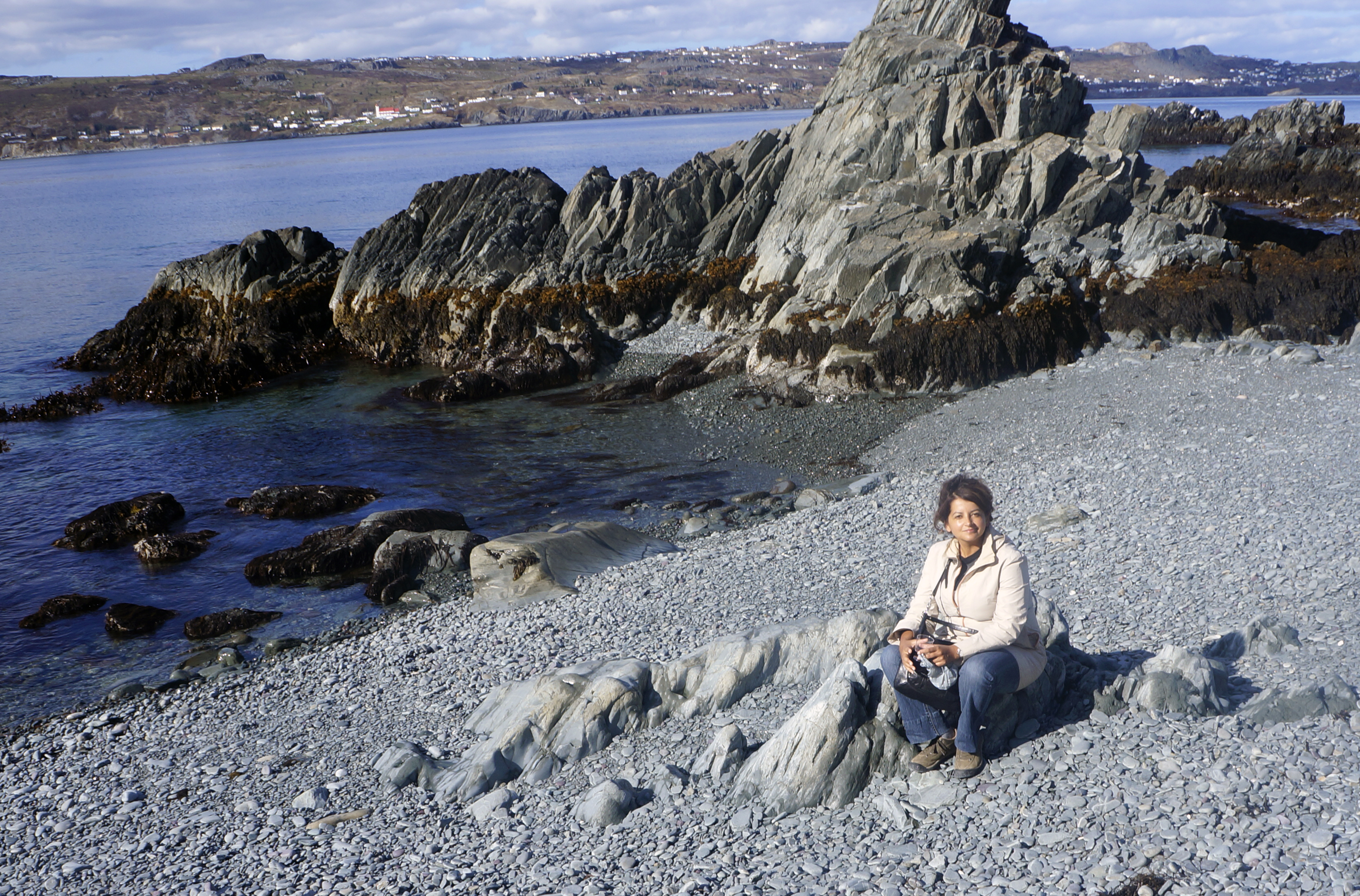
Bishops Cove across Spaniards Bay

Spaniard's Bay is a natural bay off the island of Newfoundland in the province of Newfoundland and Labrador, Canada. It extends from Conception Bay into the northern section of the Avalon Peninsula.
