= Concave =

Concave or concavity may refer to:

== Science and technology ==
- Concave lens
- Concave mirror

=== Mathematics ===
- Concave function, the negative of a convex function
- Concave polygon, a polygon that is not convex
- Concave set
- The concavity of a function, determined by its second derivative
