= Gibbett Hill Formation =

- Stratigraphic range: Ediacaran Ediacaran
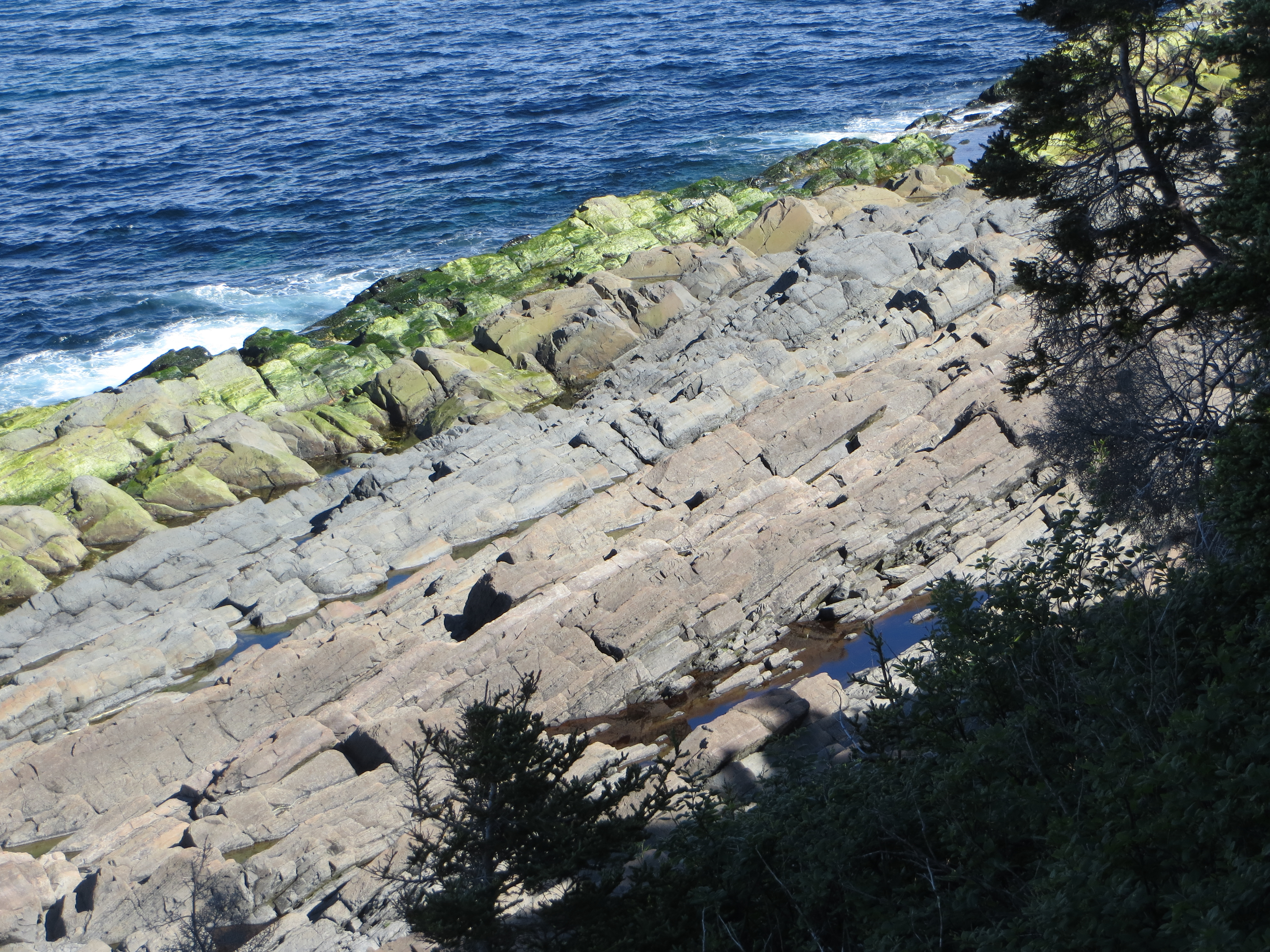
- The Gibbett Hill Formation on Bear Cove Point, NL
- Type: Formation
- Unit of: Signal Hill Group
- Underlies: Quidi Vidi Formation; Ferryland Head Formation
- Overlies: Renews Head Formation (northern peninsula); Cappahayden Formation (southern peninsula)

Lithology
- Primary: Light-gray Sandstone
- Other: Red Sandstone, Siltstone, Tuff, and Conglomerate

Location
- Region: Newfoundland
- Country: Canada

Type section
- Named by: Eugene Y. C. H.
- Year defined: 1972
- Outcrop occurrence in Newfoundland

The Gibbett Hill Formation is an Ediacaran unit cropping out in Eastern Newfoundland, representing a delta-top setting, with many light-gray sandstones and occasional red sandstones, siltstones, tuff and conglomerates. The formation also preserves a sparse record of microfossils.

== History ==
The Gibbett Hill Formation was originally simply referred to as the "Lower Member" by Rose (1952), being a part of the Signal Hill Formation, now the Signal Hill Group. In 1972, Eugene would see this Lower Member named as "Gibbett Hill", with either two options for it to be regarded as a member or for it to become a distinct formation, with the latter being chosen.

== Geology ==
The Gibbett Hill Formation can be split into four distinct facies, which are as follows :

=== Facies Ag - Conglomerate ===
This first facies predominately composed of conglomerates, and is noted to only be at the eastern headlands along the north shore at Calvert Bay and Ferryland Harbour.

At Calvert Bay, the conglomerate attains an average thickness of 8 in (203 mm), and commonly pinches and swells, and is massive in nature with no other sedimentary structures. It is predominately composed of subangular to subrounded pebbles and granules, which themselves consist of quartz, quartzite, chert, and potentially rhyolite. There can also be found intra-formational fragments of black shale. The overall sorting of this conglomerate is poor to moderate. Meanwhile, at Ferryland Harbour, there can be found two beds of sandy conglomerate, ranging between 6–10 in (152–254 mm) in thickness, with the sand making up 40% of the rock. Other than this, the composition of the conglomerate is noted to be similar to that seen at Calvert Bay, though has a decreased abundance of black shale fragments. However, unlike the Calvert Bay conglomerate is, the conglomerate at Ferryland Harbour has parallel-bedding present, alongside scour-and-fill structures, and cross-lamination, which itself indicates a North to South palaeocurrent.

=== Facies Bg - Green-gray Sandstone ===
This second facies are primarily composed of sandstones which are green-gray in colouration, and can be found at the basal and middle layers of the Gibbett Hill Formaiton.

The basal layers are noted to be fine-grained in nature, whilst towards the upper layers they become coarse-grained. These beds are thin to very thick-bedded, and range from a few inches to 15 ft (5 m), and show a progressive upward thickening towards the upper layers of the formation. The sandstones themselves are parallel-bedded, and are also laterally persistent in thickness, although it has been noted that lateral pinching out and inter-fingering of the thick-bedded sandstones of Facies Cg can be found at Outer Cove and Bay Bulls. They are also partly massive, with other sandstone beds showing parallel lamination, ripple marks, cross bedding, cross laminations, ripple-drift cross-lamination, load casts, graded bedding, and convolute beddings. The parallel lamination is noted to be the most common sedimentary structure, and can be found on the massive sandstone beds also. The ripple marks are small, with symmetrical being found on the fine-grained to coarse-grained sandstones, whilst asymmetrical ripple marks are only found on coarse-grained sandstones. The cross bedding is notably tabular in nature, attaining a thickness up to 2 ft (1 m) at North Bay and Bay Bulls, with the cross bedding indicating a North to South palaeocurrent. The cross lamination is also tabular in nature, although is much smaller, and are notably common in fine-grained sandstones, although can only be found on the eastern headland at Calvert Bay. Meanwhile, the ripple-drift cross lamination are common in fine-grained to very fine-grained sandstones, with some being continuous in nature. Load casts are notably uncommon in this facies, and can be characterised with bulbous protrusions. The graded bedding is also uncommon, primarily due to the upward decrease in grain sizes. Convolute beddings are noted to be much rarer in this facies, only being observed on the north shore and Calvert Bay, and can be characterised by tight anticline crests and broad synclinal troughs.

In terms of mineral composition, it has been noted that the sandstones in this facies are moderately well sorted and closely packed, being angular to subangular in nature, and show quartzitic texturing. The grains themselves are composed quartz, sodic plagioclase, feldspar, volcanic rock fragments, rhyolite, chert, granitic rocks, argillite, quartzite, as well as metaquartzite. Authigenic quartz is noted to be very common, with outgrowths of plagioclase also known.

=== Facies Cg - Siltstone and Argillite ===
This third facies is composed predominately of alternating laminae or thin-beds of green-gray siltstone and argillite. As previously noted, this facies also alternates with the thick-bedded sandstones of facies Bg and has minor beds of black shale. The sedimentary structures that can be found in this facies include parallel bedding, wavy bedding, ripple marks, cross lamination, ripple-drift cross lamination, as well as mud cracks. The parallel bedding is noted to be the most distinct structure in this facies, being characterised by the uniform thickness of the beds along strike. The wavy bedding is a common structure also, primarily due to the disturbance of the stratification by current structures like ripple marks and cross lamination. The ripple marks, cross lamination and ripple-drift cross lamination are all common in this facies, and are noted to be similar to structures seen in facies Bg. Meanwhile, mud cracks are very rare in comparison, only being found on the minor black shales and green-gray argillite at the eastern headlands in Calvert Bay and Ferryland Harbour, and themselves are wedge-shaped in nature and small in size, being less than 4 cm (2 in) in vertical length and less than 1 cm (0 in) wide at the upper opening of the cracks. The mud cracks are commonly filled with sand and granules, and are overlain by sandstone layers.

=== Facies Dg - Volcanic Tuffs ===
The fourth facies is composed of yellowish-green or greenish-yellow tuffs, which occur at Ferryland Harbour, Calvery Bay, Mobile Bay, Bay Bulls, and White Hills, and are thick-bedded in nature, attaining a thickness ranging between 5–15 ft (1.5–4.6 m). Small scale cross lamination and graded bedding is common in this facies, with the cross lamination showing parallel laminations and cosets, and is tabular in nature, with palaeocurrents indicated to be North to South. The graded bedding is composed primarily of detrital grains at the base, although this decreases further up the tuff beds, with microscopic graded bedding also being found in thin sections, with this being the result of the upward decrease in the sizes of glass shards in the laminae of tuffs.

The mineral composition of the tuffs in this facies are noted to be composed of albite, quartz, and sericite with a minor amount of calcite.

== Paleoenvironment ==
The environment of the Gibbet Hill Formation has been noted to represent a proximal river delta front, being a transitional area between marine and subaerial alluvial plain deposits of the Signal Hill Group, inferred from the mud cracks in the minor black shales and green-gray argillite, likely due to subaerial exposure during temporary retreats of marine water. Alongside this, the volcanic tuffs found in the formation are likely to have been ash deposited from a distant source, representing intermittent volcanic activity from the North to Northwest, although this was notably increased during the deposition of the Gibbet Hill Formation. The deposition of this ash, and overall all sediments, was likely done by weak currents, inferred from the lack of channel deposits, as well as parting lineation and large scale ripple marks, and the abundance of small-scale cross laminations and ripple marks found throughout the formation.

== Paleobiota ==
The Gibbett Hill Formation contains a collection of rare, and poorly preserved organic-walled microfossils.

| Color key: Taxon / Reclassified taxon / Taxon falsely reported as present / Dubious taxon or junior synonym / Ichnotaxon / Ootaxon / Morphotaxon | Notes; Uncertain or tentative taxa are in small text; ~~crossed out~~ taxa are discredited. |

=== Microfossils ===
| Genus | Species | Notes | Images |
|---|---|---|---|
| Lagoenaforma | Lagoenaforma sp. | Organic-walled microfossils. | |
| Granomarginata | G. prima | Organic-walled microfossils. | |
| Symplassosphaeridium | Symplassosphaeridium sp. | Acritarch. | |
| Form B | ??? | Organic-walled microfossil. | |
