= Ivesheadiomorphs =

Group of fossilised structures

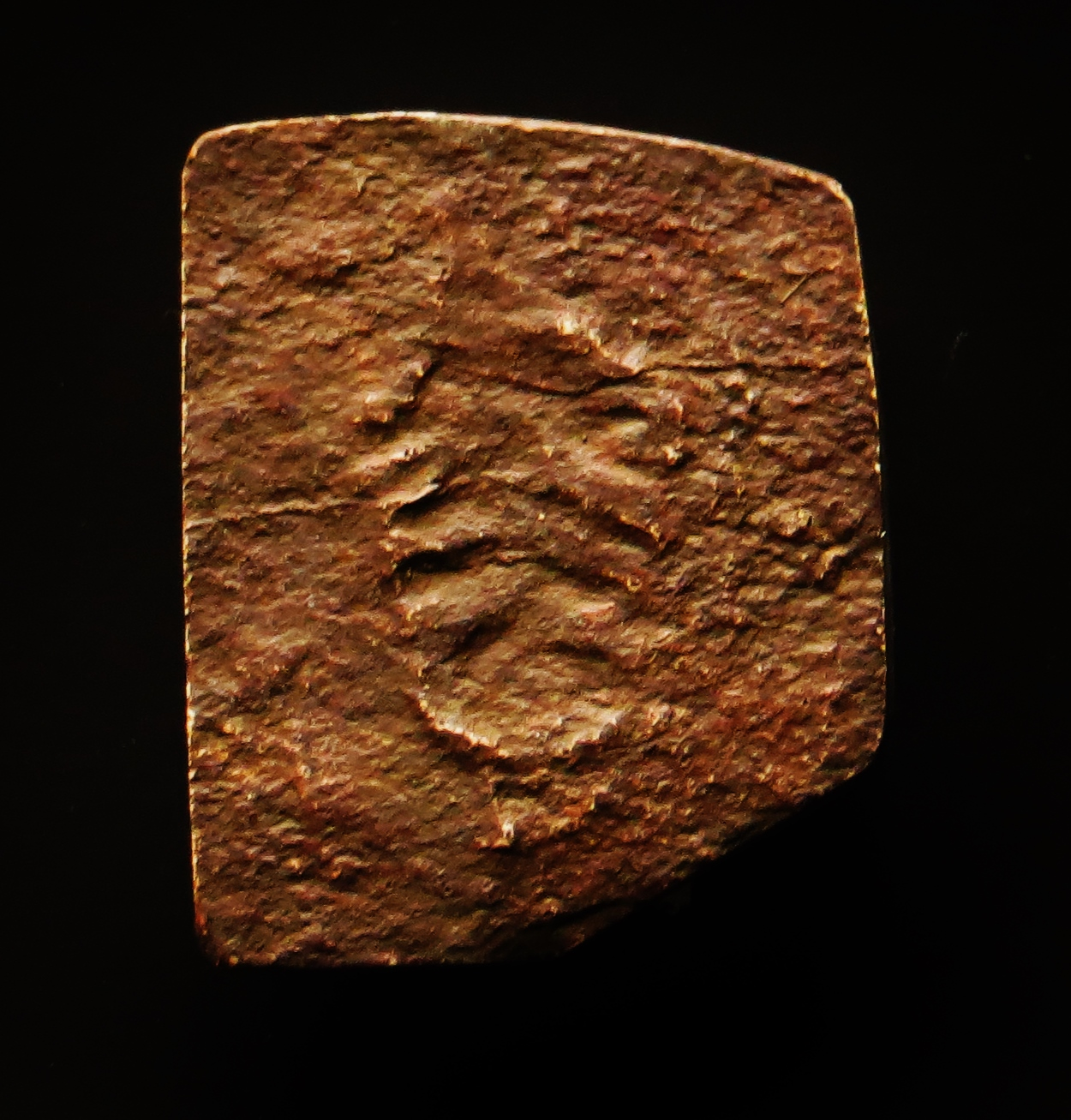
Pseudovendia charnwoodensis.

The "ivesheadiomorphs" are a group of fossilised structures known from Ediacaran localities in England and Newfoundland. They are considered to be taphomorphs, representing the poorly preserved biological remains of various contemporary taxa such as Charnia, Charniodiscus, Bradgatia, Primocandelabrum, Pectinifrons and others, that were effaced by partial decay by micro-organisms following death on the seafloor before burial by sediment.

Ivesheadiomorph structures were previously described as distinct organisms, namely Ivesheadia lobata ("pizza disk"), Blackbrookia oaksi, Shepshedia palmata and Pseudovendia charnwoodensis. However, all of these fossils have since been rejected as valid taxa.

== See also ==
- List of Ediacaran genera
