= Hylaecullulus =

Hylaecullulus Temporal range: 561–557 Ma Ediacaran

Scientific classification
- Kingdom: Animalia
- Phylum: †Petalonamae
- Clade: †Rangeomorpha
- Genus: †Hylaecullulus; Kenchington, Dunn, & Wilby, 2018
- Species: †H. fordi

Binomial name
- †Hylaecullulus fordi Kenchington, Dunn, & Wilby, 2018

Multifoliate rangeomorph

Hylaecullulus fordi, also described as dumbbells, is an extinct species of Ediacaran petalonamid whose fossils were found in the Charnwood Forest of Leicestershire, England. It serves as an important rangeomorph because of its multifoliate anatomy. Its overall body plan is similar to that of a goblet, from which its name, Hylaecullulus, alongside its common name of dumbbell, is derived from.

== Etymology ==
The name Hylaecullulus fordi is derived from the Ancient Greek words hylaeos, which means 'from the woods' (in reference to its occurrence within Charnwood Forest), and cullulus, which means "small goblet". The name of the type species, "fordi", was given to honour Trevor Ford, who made important contributions to the Ediacaran fauna.

== Discovery ==
Hylaecullulus fordi was discovered in the hilly tract of Charnwood Forest in 2018 by a team led by Charlotte G. Kenchington. This team found six well-preserved fossils at the top of the Bradgate Formation of the Maplewell Group. All of them had fossilised in epirelief (positive relief) impressions with the lateral view of the animal visible. Although two specimens out of the six fossils found were poorly preserved, they were still assigned to the genus. After the discovery of these fossils, master molds were made of them; these molds are housed within the British Geological Survey, while the holotypes are kept in situ.

== Description ==
Hylaecullulus fordi is a multifoliate rangeomorph consisting of a holdfast and a similarly sized crown, connected by a straight, proportionally long and narrow stem of uniform width. The stem is longer than the crown. The holdfast consists of multiple concentric rings and up a triangular shape where it meets the stem. The crown has a sub-circular (nearly circular) outline and is multifoliate—having multiple unrestrained folia (leaves) that all emanate from a single point at the tip of the stem. The fossils had both unfurled and furled folia, showing distal inflation.

The primary and secondary branches were typically displayed, furled, radiating, unconstrained, and proximally inflated (with unfurled branches being locally present in some specimens). Unlike the primary and secondary branches, the tertiary branches were constrained, and showed only slight radiation and distal inflation. The folia and the primary and secondary branches of the crown may manifest "eccentric branches" at any point along their length that conform to the branching pattern of their host branch, unlike other rangeomorphs that conform to the branching pattern of their neighboring folia.

=== Measurements ===
The heights of the known specimens (which are measured from the base of the stem) range from 7.6–37.6 centimetres (3.0–14.8 in). The diameter of the disc ranges from 2.7–27 centimetres (1.1–10.6 in), increasing in proportion with the total height.

=== Comparison to other rangeomorphs ===
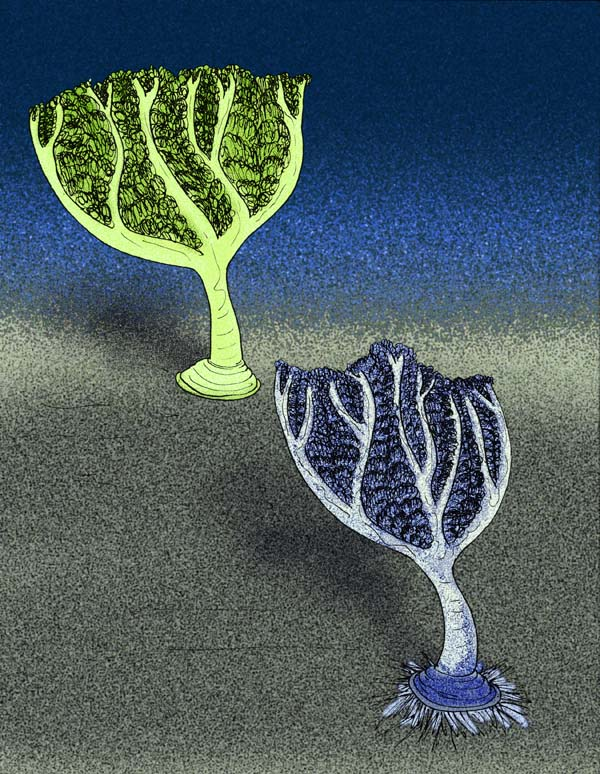
The Ediacaran fossil, Primocandelabrum, superficially resembles Hylaecullulus in anatomy, although has a much simpler holdfast and a more triangular crown.

Hylaecullulus fordi fossils are distinguished from other rangeomorphs because of its multifoliate nature, a trait only shared with Bradgatia and Primocandelabrum. These two taxa also occur alongside H. fordi fossils on Bed B of the Bradgate Formation, although they both deviate a little from Hylaecullulus. Bradgatia has a similar multifoliate anatomy, although it lacks a proper stem and instead has a small, bulb-shaped holdfast. The architecture of the branches within Bradgatia are also distinct from Hylaecullulus, since the folia seen in Bradgatia are unfurled and show signs of radiation from all resolvable orders of its branching. Primocandelabrum only superficially resembles Hylaecullulus because it possesses a more anatomically simple holdfast alongside a straight and proportionally shorter stem. The bushy crown of Primocandelabrum is distinct from the crown of H. fordi because of its notably triangular outline and branches that are coarser and in the shape of a candelabrum.

== Significance for Ediacaran fauna and rangeomorphs ==
H. fordi indicates greater architectural complexity and modular organization in rangeomorph body plans, highlighting the importance of modularity when evolving to have a larger body plan in phylogenetically disparate taxa and clades. The evolution of eccentric branch growths indicate their ability to respond to physical, external stimuli and recover from damage, giving them considerable environmental tolerance.

== See also ==
- List of Ediacaran genera
