= Haootia =

Haootia Temporal range: Late Ediacaran, 560 Ma
- Fossil Haootia quadriformis

Scientific classification
- Kingdom: Animalia
- Phylum: Cnidaria
- Class: Staurozoa
- Genus: †Haootia; Liu et al., 2014
- Species: †H. quadriformis

Binomial name
- †Haootia quadriformis Liu et al., 2014

Species of Ediacaran cnidarian

Haootia quadriformis is an extinct animal belonging to the Ediacaran biota. Estimated to be about 560 million years old, H. quadriformis is identified as a cnidarian polyp, and represents the earliest known evidence for muscle tissue in an animal. Discovered in 2008 from Newfoundland in eastern Canada, it was formally described in 2014. It is the first Ediacaran organism discovered to show fossils of muscle fibres. Structural examination of the muscles and morphology indicate that the animal is a cnidarian, though, which class H. quadriformis belongs to was undetermined until a 2024 study found it to be a staurozoan.

== Discovery and name ==
The first fossil of Haootia was discovered from lower Fermeuse Formation of Back Cove, Bonavista Peninsula in Newfoundland. It was originally unearthed by Martin D. Brasier of the University of Oxford in 2008. However, the specimen was initially not allowed to be removed according to provincial law in Newfoundland, so that only a plaster cast was made. The cast (plastotype) is maintained in the collections of the Oxford University Museum of Natural History. The actual fossil specimen, or holotype, was later collected and is now on display at The Rooms in St. John's, Newfoundland. A second, incomplete specimen was also discovered in the Trepassey Formation of Burnt Point, Bonavista Peninsula.

The generic name Haootia is derived from the Beothuk word Haoot, meaning 'demon', to signify the striking appearance of the holotype. The specific name quadriformis is said to be derived from Latin quadri, meaning 'fourfold', and formis, for 'form', relating to the quadrilateral symmetry of the body. The proper word in classical Latin for 'fourfold' is actually quadruplex, while forma is the proper word in classical Latin for 'form'.

== Description ==
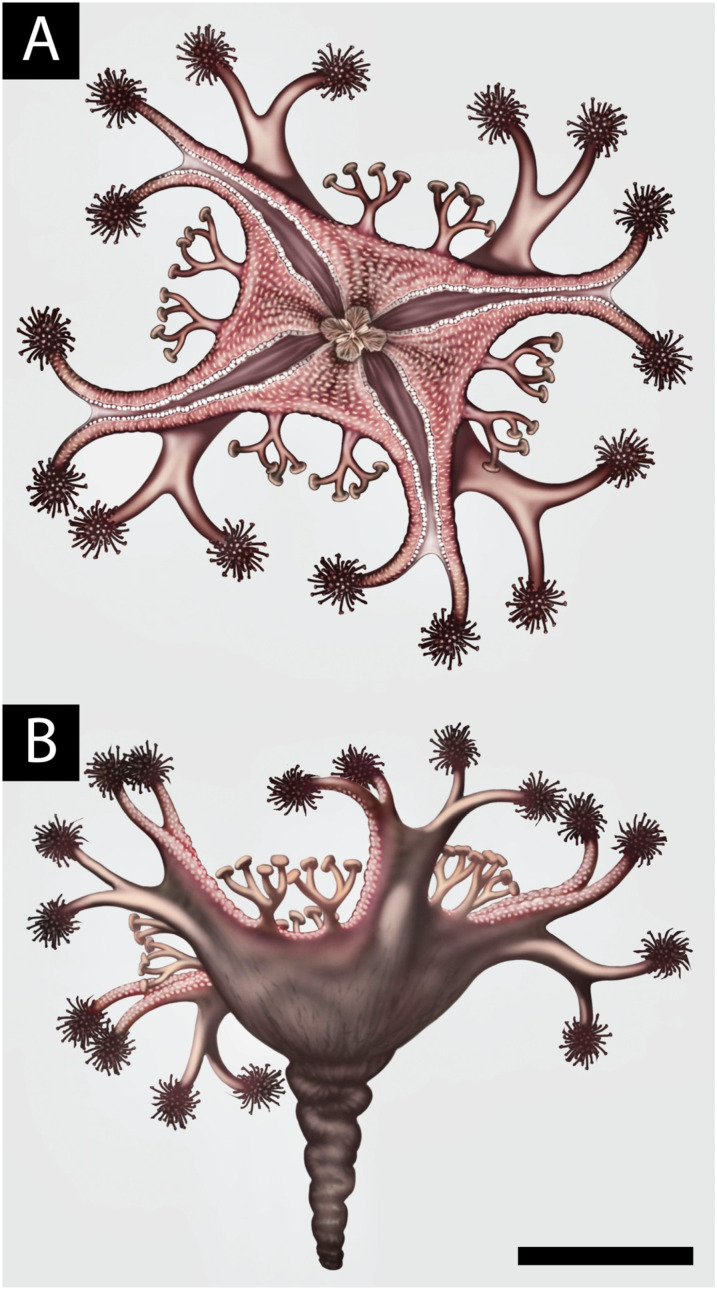
Life restoration from McIlroy et al., 2024

Haootia quadriformis is uniquely different from any other Ediacaran fossil so far discovered in that it consists of bundles of fibres that have been identified as muscles. The entire body is in a broadly four-fold symmetrical arrangement. Thus the overall body organisation conforms to the key features of modern cnidarians. The fossil measures 56 mm × 37 mm (2.2 in × 1.5 in) in diameter. It indicates it is a soft-bodied animal having an appearance of a smooth discoidal structure connected by a relatively short stem to a quadrate body comprising numerous and regularly aligned linear fibres. The fibres, which are similar in pattern to parallelly arranged muscle fibres, extend laterally across the body, linking adjacent corners. The fibres extend beyond each corner to form an elongate branch, which is divided into smaller dichotomous branches. Smaller branches also arise from the lateral margins of the quadrate body, and also form dichotomously branched fibres.

== See also ==
- List of Ediacaran genera
