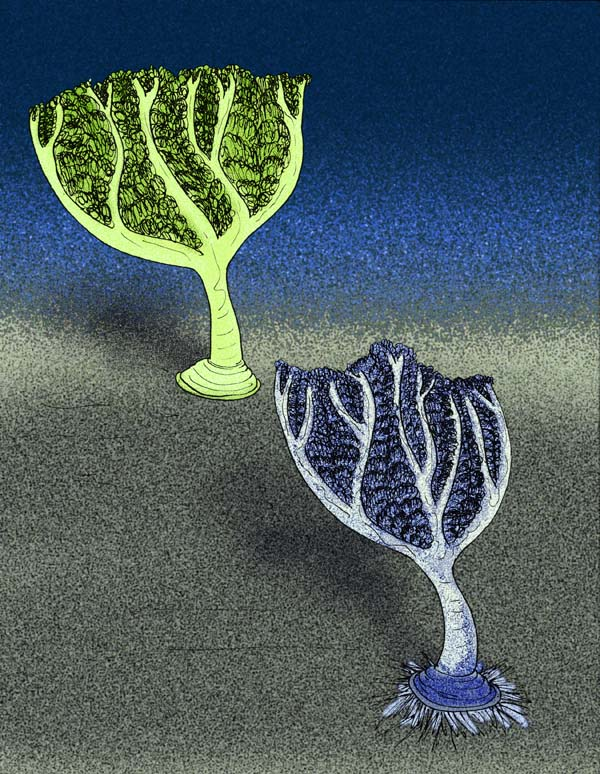
- Reconstruction of Primocandelabrum

Scientific classification
- Kingdom: Animalia
- Phylum: †Petalonamae
- Clade: †Rangeomorpha
- Genus: †Primocandelabrum; Hofmann, O'Brien & King, 2008

Type species
- †Primocandelabrum hiemaloranum Hofmann, O'Brien & King, 2008

Species
- See text

= Primocandelabrum =

Primocandelabrum Temporal range: late Ediacaran ~574–550 Ma

Genus of frond fossils

Primocandelabrum is a common feather-duster like genus of rangeomorph from the late Ediacaran of Newfoundland and England.

== Discovery ==
The holotype fossil material of Primocandelabrum was found in the Mistaken Point Formation, Conception Group, Newfoundland and Labrador in Canada in 2005, and formally described and named in 2008.

== Etymology ==
The generic name Primocandelabrum derives from the Latin word primus, to mean "first"; and the word candelabrum, in reference to its overall shape. The specific name of the type species hiemaloranum derives from the genus name Hiemalora, due to the appearance of its holdfast structure.

The specific name of P. boyntoni derives from the surname of Helen Boynton, in honour for her work on the fossils within Charnwood Forest. The specific name of P. aethelflaedia derives from the name of Lady Aethelflaed, who was a Lady of the Mercians, which would have covered the Charnwood Forest. And the specific name of P. aelfwynnia derives from the name of Lady Aelfwynn, who was the last Lady of the Mericans.

== Description ==
Primocandelabrum is a frondose organism, with a feather duster like morphology. Like most rangeomorphs, they have a holdfast structure, which can get up to 7.8 cm (3.1 in) in diameter, with some species preserving tentacle-like structures, which bare some resemblance to the discoidal form Hiemalora. All species from the Bradgate Formation also bear concentric rings on their holdfast structures, although this may simply be an effect of taphonomy. Ontop of this holdfast structure is the stem, growing up to 12.4 cm (4.9 in) in height, and at a uniform width, up to 3 cm (1.2 in) in the largest specimens. Then there are the distinctive fronds coming out of the top of the stem, always numbering three fronds all together, and are always double the length of the stem, with the largest coming in at 23.4 cm (9.2 in) in length, and 20 cm (7.9 in) in width.

== Distribution ==
Primocandelabrum can be found from a number of formations across the Avalon assemblage, being found in the Mistaken Point Formation, Trepassey Formation and Fermeuse Formation in Newfoundland, Canada, as well as the White Sea assemblage aged Inner Meadow site. It can also be found in the Bradgate Formation of the Charnwood Forest, England, of which it is the most common fossil within that formation.

== Taxonomy ==
To date, Primocandelabrum currently contains four valid species, and one unassigned species, which are as follows:

Fossil specimens of Primocandelabrum from Bonavista Peninsula:

- Primocandelabrum hiemaloranum Hofmann, 2008
- Primocandelabrum sp. Hofmann, 2008

Fossil specimens of Primocandelabrum from Charnwood Forest:

- Primocandelabrum aelfwynnia Kenchington & Wilby, 2017
- Primocandelabrum boyntoni Kenchington & Wilby, 2017
- Primocandelabrum aethelflaedia Kenchington & Wilby, 2017

== See also ==
- Hylaecullulus
- List of Ediacaran genera
