= Bradgatia =

Bradgatia Temporal range: late Ediacaran ~575–550.78 Ma
- A reconstruction of Bradgatia

Scientific classification
- Kingdom: Animalia
- Phylum: †Petalonamae
- Clade: †Rangeomorpha
- Family: †Charniidae
- Genus: †Bradgatia; Boynton & Ford, 1995
- Species: †B. linfordensis

Binomial name
- †Bradgatia linfordensis Boynton & Ford, 1995

Genus of rangeomorphs

Bradgatia is a bush-like Ediacaran fossil, superficially resembling a compressed cabbage in appearance. It has been found in the United Kingdom and Newfoundland and Labrador. It is a monotypic genus, containing only Bradgatia linfordensis.

== Discovery and naming ==
Fossils of Bradgatia were found in the Hallgate Member of the Bradgate Formation, England, United Kingdom in 1994, and formally described and named in 1995.

The generic name derives from the placename of Bradgate Park, were the fossils were found. The specific name derives from the nearby village of Newton Linford.

== Description ==
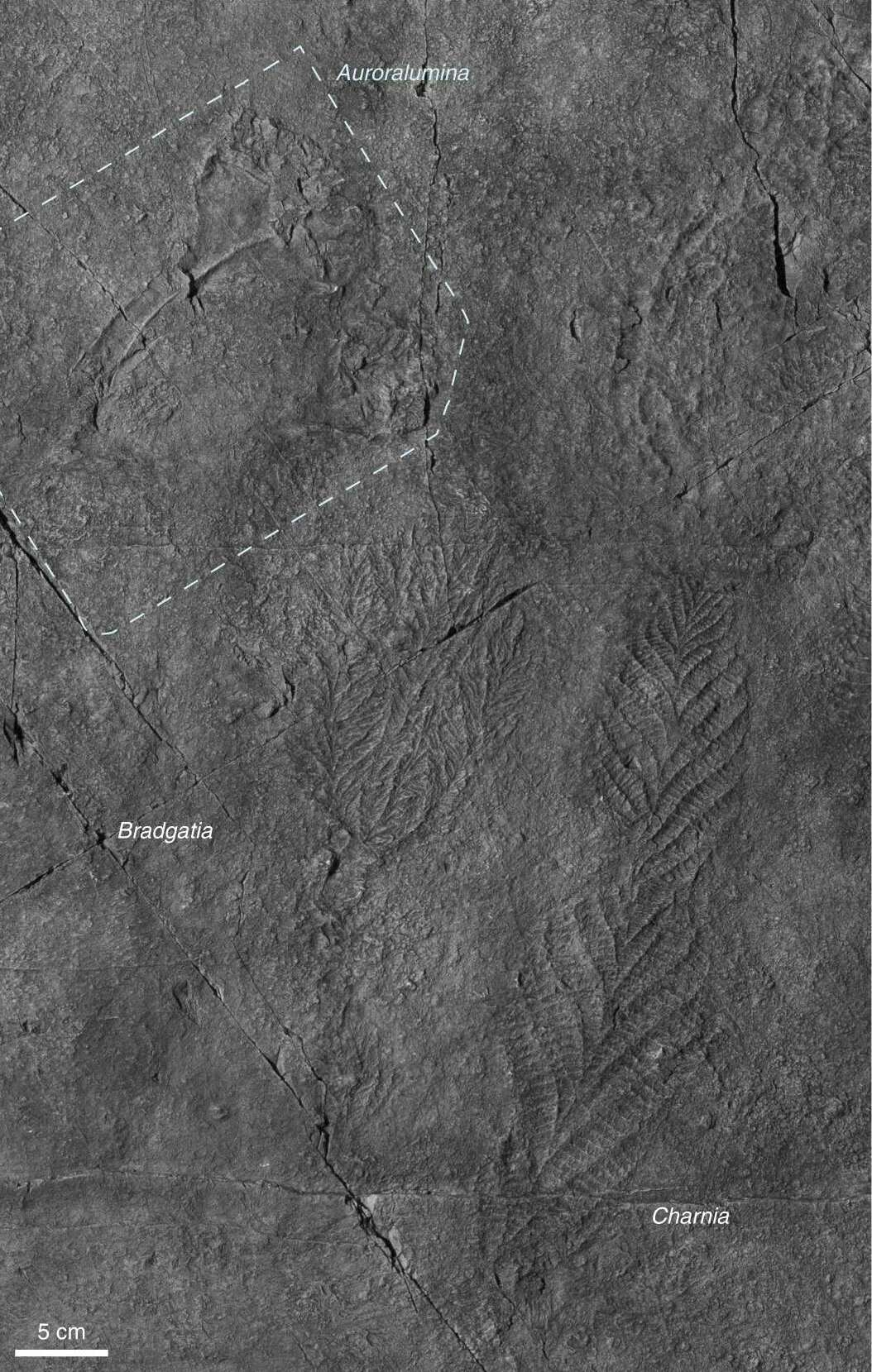
Bradgatia (middle) in an assemblage with Auroralumina (top left) and Charnia (bottom right) at Charnwood Forest

Bradgatia linfordensis is a petalonamid, consisting of up to six or more fronds, which radiates from a central anchor point, or holdfast, at its base. As such, it has been likened to a compressed cabbage. The fronds themselves are regularly spaced out from one another suggesting that Bradgatia was fairly rigid, and which could grow up to 300 mm (11.8 in) in height, towering over some of the smaller petalonamids around it.

== Distribution ==
Bradgatia has been found in the Charnwood Forest in England, at Mistaken Point and Bonavista Peninsula in Newfoundland and also in British Columbia. These fossils are dated from 565 to 575 mya. Alongside this, it has also been recently described from the 550 million year old Inner Meadow site, also in Newfoundland, placing it within the White Sea assemblage.

== See also ==
- List of Ediacaran genera
- Hylaecullulus
