= Hiemalora =

Hiemalora Temporal range: Ediacaran, 565–550 Ma

Scientific classification
- Domain: incertae sedis
- Genus: †Hiemalora; Fedonkin 1982

Type species
- †Hiemalora stellaris

Species
- †H. stellaris (Fedonkin, 1980); †H. pleiomorphus Vodanjuk, 1989

Synonyms
- †Pinegia Fedonkin, 1980; †Pinegia stellaris Fedonkin, 1980

Ediacaran fossil genus

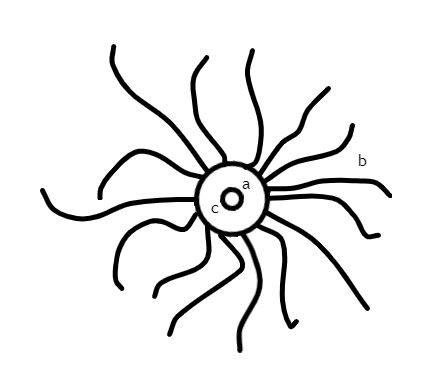
A simplified diagram of Hiemalora pleiomorpha. A: discoidal main body, B: marginal set of rod-like radial elements (tentacles?) and C: circular protrusion in the centre of discoidal main body.

Hiemalora is a fossil of the Ediacaran biota, reaching around 3 cm in diameter, which superficially resembles a sea anemone. The genus has a sack-like body with faint radiating lines originally interpreted as tentacles, but discovery of a frond-like structure seemingly attached to some Heimalora has added weight to a competing interpretation: that it represents the holdfast of a larger organism.

In 2020, a new study was published that described nine different specimens from the Indreelva member, Digermulen Peninsula, Finnmark (Arctic Norway). The specimens described in the paper have high degrees of variation between morphologies and within the specimens that are thought to be of the same species. Some of the representative fossils from that paper either show multiple Aspidella-like structures on the same specimen, or a Primocandelabrum-like cone visible in one of the fossils. All of the examples of fossils in the publication were determined to most likely represent the species Hiemalora stellaris, however, one of the more poorly preserved specimens (D18-50) is thought to have been representative of Hiemalora pleiomorphus, although the latter of the species represented by the specimens does not show parallel ridges running along the poorly preserved central disc. A representative of H, stellaris might have represented a holdfast with a Primocandelabrum frond attached to it, which may further support the theory of Hiemalora being a holdfast for Primocandelabrum.

This interpretation would stand against its original classification in the medusoid Cnidaria; it would also consign a once-popular hypothesis placing Hiemalora in the chondrophores, on the basis of its tentacle structure, to the dustbin. Studies testing the feasibility of the hypothesis investigated the possibilities that such fragile tentacles could be preserved, and concluded that it would be very improbable — especially as many Hiemalora bearing beds also contain such fossils as Cyclomedusa, but do not preserve the tentacles on these organisms.

Hiemalora has been identified in a wide range of facies and locations globally.

== Etymology ==
The genus was originally named Pinegia, but was renamed two years later when it was realised that a genus of Permian insect already bore the name. The revised name comes from Latin hiemalis ora, "winter coast".

== See also ==
- List of Ediacaran genera
