= Hadrynichorde =

Hadrynichorde Temporal range: Ediacaran

Scientific classification
- Kingdom: Animalia
- Phylum: incertae sedis
- Class: incertae sedis
- Order: incertae sedis
- Family: incertae sedis
- Genus: †Hadrynichorde; Hofmann et al. 2008

Type species
- Hadrynichorde catalinensis

Ediacaran organism

Hadrynichorde is a frondose organism from the Ediacaran period (635-541 mya) discovered in Newfoundland, Canada. It is a sessile, benthic marine organism. resembling modern sea whips.

== Morphology, anatomy, & behavior ==
Hadrynichorde specimens are described as filamentous, string-like fossils with basal discs. These basal discs are ellipsoid or ovoid in shape and are interpreted as holdfasts, though some hypothesize that the discs are unrelated to the fronds. The string-like portion of Hadrynichorde is described as curvilinear, either uniform or with a slight taper. The specimens found are uncoiled, but display bends and kinks indicating draping over other organisms. The strings resemble burrows, but due to the tapering nature and terminal disc, this is unlikely. Some specimens have swelling along their length, resembling a knotted string.

The orientation of strings of Hadrynichorde is parallel to some Charnia fronds on same bedding plane, indicating a tethered or sessile lifestyle. Specimens are estimated to reach up to a meter above the sea floor. This interpretation is consistent with the interpretation of a similar organism, Hadryniscala, as Laminaria-like kelp fragment. Hadrynichorde is hypothesized to be a photosynthetic organism.

There is some discussion that Hadrynichorde may be part of a larger body fossil.

== Method of fossilization ==
Hadrynichorde fossils have been discovered in Newfoundland as molds and negative epireliefs, and similar but unidentified organisms have been found in Australia and Russia as negative and positive epireliefs, and negative hyporeliefs in fine-grained siliciclastic rocks.

== Distribution & paleoenvironment ==
Specimens have been found in the Mistaken Point, Fermeuse, Trepassey, Shepherd Point, Rowland Head, Murphy's Cove, and Little Catalina formations in Newfoundland, Canada, as well as in Bradgate Park in Charnwood Forest, Leicestershire (United Kingdom). Both localities are inferred to be deep water depositional environments, indicating that Hadrynichorde is a benthic, sessile organism. Similar structures were found in the Flinders Ranges of South Australia and the White Sea areas of Russia.

It is theorized that Hadrynichorde could be a predecessor to extant sea whips, or Alcyonacea, which are deep marine colonial organisms. Another Ediacaran biota, Charnia, was found with Hadrynichorde in Newfoundland bedding planes. Charnia was previously associated with another marine organism known as a sea pen. Sea pens and sea whips coexist in some deep-water environments today, possibly mirroring the coexistence of Hadrynichorde and Charnia in Precambrian deep-water environments.

== Other notable characteristics ==
Hadrynichorde resembles the modern cylindrical brown algae Chorda, or red algae Nemalion, but its depositional environment suggests that it is some other type of photosynthetic organism. If it was algal, it would have remained in photic zone. Hadrynichorde also bears similarity to trace fossils that are around 30 million years younger than it, which could be studied to determine the genus' taxonomic affinity. Hadrynichorde is also comparable to the ichnogenus Planolites, though affinity with this taxon is unlikely. Hadrynichorde is also similar to modern sea whips, which are cnidarian organisms that exist in benthic marine environments.

Hadrynichorde is named for its appearance in Hadrynian rocks and its string-like appearance. Its species name comes from its appearance in Catalina Harbor
