= 1949 in paleontology =

Paleontology or palaeontology is the study of prehistoric life forms on Earth through the examination of plant and animal fossils. This includes the study of body fossils, tracks (ichnites), burrows, cast-off parts, fossilised feces (coprolites), palynomorphs and chemical residues. Because humans have encountered fossils for millennia, paleontology has a long history both before and after becoming formalized as a science. This article records significant discoveries and events related to paleontology that occurred or were published in the year 1949.

== Arthropods ==
=== Insects ===
Name	Novelty	Status	Authors	Age	Unit	Location	Notes	Images
Parastylotermes	Gen. 4 comb nov	valid	Snyder & Emerson	Ypresian-Miocene	Latah Formation	USA; Washington	A Stylotermitid termite genus. The type species is Stylotermes washingtonensis Also includes S. calico, S. frazieri, & S. robustus.	Parastylotermes krishnai
Ulmeriella latahensis	Sp nov.	Valid	Snyder	Miocene	Latah Formation	USA; Washington	A harvester termite	

== Archosauromorphs ==
=== Archosauromorphs ===
Name	Novelty	Status	Authors	Age	Location	Notes	Images
Elachistosuchus	Gen et sp nov	valid	Janensch	Late Triassic (Norian)	* Germany	A neodiapsid reptile.	

=== Plesiosaurs ===
- Plesiosaur gastroliths documented.

== Synapsids ==
=== Non-mammalian ===
Name	Status	Authors	Age	Location	Notes	Images
Aneugomphius	Jr. Synonym of Theriognathus.	Broom and Robinson	Wuchiapingian	South Africa		
Homodontosaurus	Valid	Broom	Wuchiapingian	South Africa	A therocephalian	
Lemurosaurus	Valid	Broom	Wuchiapingian	* South Africa	A biarmosuchian	Lemurosaurus
Myosauroides	Valid	Broom	Wuchiapingian	South Africa	A dicynodont	

== Other animals ==
Name	Novelty	Status	Authors	Age	Location	Notes	Images
Cyclomedusa gigantea	Sp. nov.		Sprigg	Ediacaran	Australia	A member of the genus Cyclomedusa. Considered a probable junior synonym of Aspidella terranovica by Gehling, Narbonne & Anderson (2000) and Ivantsov & Zakhrevskaya (2025).	
Cyclomedusa radiata	Sp. nov.		Sprigg	Ediacaran	Australia	A member of the genus Cyclomedusa. Considered a probable junior synonym of Aspidella terranovica by Gehling, Narbonne & Anderson (2000) and Ivantsov & Zakhrevskaya (2025).	
Dickinsonia minima	Sp. nov.	Junior synonym	Sprigg	Ediacaran	Australia	A member of the genus Dickinsonia. Synonym of Dickinsonia costata.	
Magdiana	Gen. et sp. nov.	Junior homonym	Sprigg	Ediacaran	Australia	A discoid fossil, originally described as a jellyfish of unknown affinity. The type species is M. annulata. Southcott (1958) coined a replacement name Spriggia. Considered a probable junior synonym of Aspidella terranovica by Gehling, Narbonne & Anderson (2000) and Ivantsov & Zakhrevskaya (2025).	
Medusina asteroides	Sp. nov.		Sprigg	Ediacaran	Australia	A discoid fossil, originally described as a jellyfish of unknown affinity. Transferred to the genus Medusinites by Glaessner & Wade (1966). Considered a probable junior synonym of Aspidella terranovica by Ivantsov & Zakhrevskaya (2025).	
Medusina filamentus	Sp. nov.	Junior synonym	Sprigg	Ediacaran	Australia	A discoid fossil, originally described as a jellyfish of unknown affinity. Placed in synonymy with Pseudorhizostomites howchini by Glaessner & Wade (1966).	
Medusina mawsoni	Sp. nov.	Junior synonym	Sprigg	Ediacaran	Australia	A discoid fossil, originally described as a jellyfish of unknown affinity. Transferred to the genus Medusinites and placed in synonymy with Medusinites asteroides by Glaessner & Wade (1966). Considered a probable junior synonym of Aspidella terranovica by Ivantsov & Zakhrevskaya (2025).	
Protodipleurosoma	Gen. et sp. nov.	Junior synonym	Sprigg	Ediacaran	Australia	A discoid fossil, originally described as a hydrozoan jellyfish in the order Leptothecata. Synonym of Ediacaria. The type species is P. wardi. Considered a probable junior synonym of Aspidella terranovica by Gehling, Narbonne & Anderson (2000) and Ivantsov & Zakhrevskaya (2025).	
Protoniobia	Gen. et sp. nov.		Sprigg	Ediacaran	Australia	A discoid fossil, originally described as a hydrozoan jellyfish in the order Anthoathecata. The type species is P. wadea. Considered a probable junior synonym of Aspidella terranovica by Ivantsov & Zakhrevskaya (2025).	
Pseudorhizostomites	Gen. et sp. nov.		Sprigg	Ediacaran	Australia	A discoid fossil, originally described as a scyphozoan jellyfish in the order Rhizostomeae. The type species is P. howchini.	
Pseudorhopilema	Gen. et sp. nov.	Junior synonym	Sprigg	Ediacaran	Australia	A discoid fossil, originally described as a scyphozoan jellyfish in the order Rhizostomeae. Synonym of Pseudorhizostomites. The type species is P. chapmani.	
Tateana	Gen. et sp. nov.		Sprigg	Ediacaran	Australia	A discoid fossil, originally described as a scyphozoan jellyfish in the order Semaeostomeae. The type species is T. inflata. Considered a probable junior synonym of Aspidella terranovica by Gehling, Narbonne & Anderson (2000) and Ivantsov & Zakhrevskaya (2025).	
