= Coomb Volcanic Formation =

Geologic formation in Wales, United Kingdom

- Stratigraphic range: Ediacaran 566–563 Ma
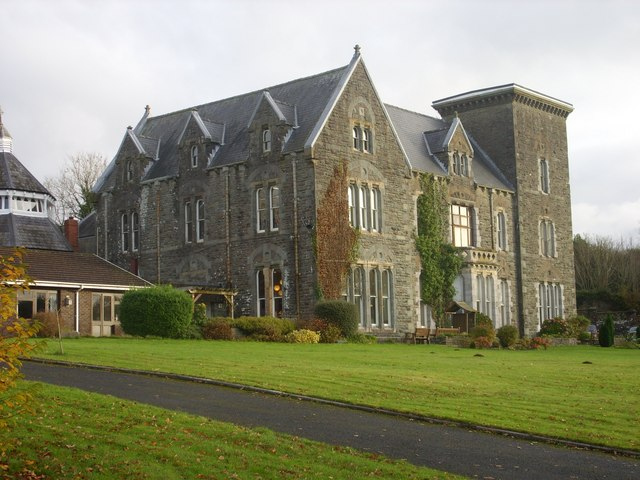
- Coomb Cheshire House, one of the localites after which the formation is named.
- Type: Formation
- Unit of: Llangynog Inlier
- Sub-units: See: Members
- Thickness: 1,100 m (3,600 ft)

Lithology
- Primary: Volcaniclastic Rocks
- Other: Rhyolite, Dolerite, Dacite, Rhyolitic Conglomerate

Location
- Region: Carmarthenshire
- Country: Wales

Type section
- Named for: Coomb Cheshire House and Allt y Coomb
- Named by: Cope et Bevins
- Year defined: 1993

The Coomb Volcanic Formation is a geologic formation that outcrops in Carmarthenshire, South Wales. It is primarily composed of volcaniclastic rocks and rhyolite, and also preserves fossils dating back to the Ediacaran period.

== History and name ==
The Llangynog Inlier, in which the Coomb Volcanic Formation sits in, was first mentioned in 1982, when John Cope gave the stratigraphical name to the area after the village of Llangynog in Carmarthenshire, though the rocks had long been known as far back as 1839. Studies in this area would only begin to intensify as Cope went out to investigate and map the geology around Carmarthen, which not only led him to the discovery of the first Tremadocian aged rocks in the area, but Ediacaran fossils as well in 1977, which were found on surfaces underlying the aforementioned Tremadocian layers. Come 1993 Cope, alongside R.E. Bevins, would finalise his investigation of the stratigraphy, as well as the Ediacaran fossils, within the Llangynog Inlier, and gave the Ediacaran rocks a formal lithostratigraphical name, that being the Coomb Volcanic Formation after several features near the type locality which bore the name "Coomb", such as the Coomb Cheshire Home and a wooded area known as Allt y Coomb, with Llangynog Inlier referring to the Ediacaran, Cambrian and Ordovician rocks in the wider area.

== Geology ==
The Coomb Volcanic Formation is predominately composed of volcaniclastic rocks and rhyolite. The inlier is unconformably overlain by the Devonian aged Old Red Sandstone assemblage along its southern side. Meanwhile, along the western side, it is down-faulted with middle Ordovician rocks, dated to the Llanvrin, now Darriwilian stage. Finally, along the northern and eastern sides of the inlier, it is faulted by Cambrian aged rocks. The formation is a part of the Llangynog Inlier, which sits within the wider Wrekin terrane.

=== Members ===
The Coomb Volcanic Formation is split into two members, which are as follows, in ascending stratigraphic order (lowest to highest):

- Castell Cogan Rhyolite Member: Named for the Iron Age fort Castell Cogan, this member is primarily composed of blue to grey weathering rhyolitic lava rock which are silicified in nature, with the lowest known sections of the member containing doleritic intrusions, although these are no longer exposed since being covered by a road. The member reaches up to 400 m (1,300 ft) in thickness, although is possibly larger as its base is not exposed, meanwhile it is overlain in the south by the lower sections of the Old Red Sandstone.
- Coed Cochion Volcaniclastic Member: Named for the now lost Coed Cochion house, this member is predominately composed of volcaniclastic sediments, with layers of basic lava rock, rhyolitic lava rock and conglomerate throughout. Within the lower sections of the member, there can be found layers of thin-bedded siltstone, which are inter-bedded with two thin layers of basalt. This then gives way to rhyolite and rhyolitic conglomerate, up to 30 m (98 ft) thick, which contains sandstone clasts. The thin-bedded layers of siltstone then returns above this with a layer of basalt rock at the top, which is immediately preceded by a fault of unknown throw. The middle sections of the member contain further layers of thin-bedded siltstone, which contains two large intrusions, one composed of dolerite and another composed of dacite. Another fault of unknown throw is seen above the middle section, with the upper section containing more siltstones and basalt layers. The member reaches up to 700 m (2,300 ft) in thickness, and is notably fossiliferous in nature, ranging from sparse, to crowded.

== Dating ==
U-Pb dating was performed on several zircon samples collected from the middle of the Coomb Volcanic Formation, with samples from the upper section of the Castell Cogan Rhyolite Member recovering a date of 566±0 Ma, whilst samples from the lower sections of the Coed Cochion Volcaniclastic Member recovered a date of 563±0 Ma. The middle of the Coomb Volcanic Formation was then temporally correlated with the Fermeuse Formation of Newfoundland in what would have been West Avalonia, whilst in East Avalonia it correlates to the Beacon Hill Formation in the Charnwood Forest, as well as the neighbouring Stretton Shale Formation in Long Mynd.

== Paleoenvironment ==
The rocks of the upper sections of the Coomb Volcanic Formation are inferred to have been deposited within a shallow marine environment which may have been inter-tidal in nature, due to the sand like consistency of the volcaniclastic sediments which bear ripple marks on their surface. The sediments themselves most likely came from emerging volcanic islands, which would have resulted in ash-flow tuff units. Once dating had been undertaken at the middle section of the formation, this was further supported by correlating to the shallow marine sections of the Fermeuse Formation in Newfoundland, which is also tidally influenced.

== Paleobiota ==
The Coomb Volcanic Formation contains a number of discoidal organisms, such as Aspidella and Ediacaria, as well as the agglutinating organism Palaeopascichnus.

Color key: Taxon / Reclassified taxon / Taxon falsely reported as present / Dubious taxon or junior synonym / Ichnotaxon / Ootaxon / Morphotaxon

Notes
Uncertain or tentative taxa are in small text
~~crossed out~~ taxa are discredited.

=== incertae sedis ===
Genus	Species	Notes	Images
Aspidella	A. terranovica	Enigmatic discoidal fossil.	
Cyclomedusa	Cyclomedusa sp.	Enigmatic discoidal fossil, possibly a synonym of Aspidella.	
Ediacaria	Ediacaria sp.	Enigmatic discoidal fossil, possibly a synonym of Aspidella.	
Hiemalora	Hiemalora sp.	Discoid organism, possibly holdfasts of petalonamids.	
Medusinites	Medusinites sp.	Enigmatic discoidal fossil, possibly a synonym of Aspidella.	
Palaeopascichnus	P. linearis	Palaeopascichnid organism. Misspelled as "Palaeopastichnus" in Cope and Bevins, 1993, and originally referred to as a "Meandering feeding trail" in Cope, 1982.	
Tirasiana	Tirasiana sp.	Enigmatic discoidal fossil, possibly a synonym of Aspidella.	

=== Ichnogenera ===
Genus	Species	Notes	Images
Cochlichnus	Cochlichnus sp.	Burrows.	
Sinusoidal trace	???	A sinusoidal trace fossil, possibly a feeding trace of an unknown organism.	

== See also ==
- List of fossiliferous stratigraphic units in the United Kingdom
