= 1947 in paleontology =

Paleontology or palaeontology is the study of prehistoric life forms on Earth through the examination of plant and animal fossils. This includes the study of body fossils, tracks (ichnites), burrows, cast-off parts, fossilised feces (coprolites), palynomorphs and chemical residues. Because humans have encountered fossils for millennia, paleontology has a long history both before and after becoming formalized as a science. This article records significant discoveries and events related to paleontology that occurred or were published in the year 1947.

== Mosses ==
Name	Novelty	Status	Authors	Age	Unit	Location	Synonymized taxa	Notes	Images
Palaeohypnum	Sp nov	jr synonym	Steere	Eocene; Pribonian	Florissant Formation	United States; Colorado		A moss genus. The type species is P. patens Also included P. arnoldianum, P. brittoniae, P. brownii, & P. knowltoni Species moved to Archaeomnium in 1952; Moved to Hypnites in 1980	

== Archosauromorphs ==
=== Newly named dinosaurs ===
Data courtesy of George Olshevsky's dinosaur genera list.

Name	Status	Authors	Age	Location	Notes	Images
Amygdalodon	Nomen dubium	Cabrera	Middle Jurassic Toarcian	* Argentina	A sauropod known from some vertebrae, ribs, four complete and three partial teeth, and a partial pelvis and shoulder-blade.	Amygdalodon

=== Newly named pseudosuchians ===
Name	Status	Authors	Age	Location	Notes	Images
Arizonasaurus	Valid	Welles	Middle Triassic (Anisian)	USA (Arizona and New Mexico)	A poposaurid.	Arizonasaurus

== Synapsids ==
=== Non-mammalian ===
Name	Status	Authors	Age	Location	Notes	Images
Kunminia	Valid	Young	Sinemurian	* China		

== Other animals ==
Name	Novelty	Status	Authors	Age	Location	Notes	Images
Beltanella	Gen. et sp. nov.		Sprigg	Ediacaran	Australia	A discoid fossil, originally described as a jellyfish tentatively placed in the class Scyphozoa. The type species is B. gilesi. Considered a probable junior synonym of Aspidella terranovica by Gehling, Narbonne & Anderson (2000) and Ivantsov & Zakhrevskaya (2025).	
Cyclomedusa	Gen. et sp. nov.		Sprigg	Ediacaran	Australia	A discoid fossil, originally described as a jellyfish of uncertain affinity (either of the classes Hydrozoa or Scyphozoa). The type species is C. davidii. Considered a probable junior synonym of Aspidella terranovica by Gehling, Narbonne & Anderson (2000) and Ivantsov & Zakhrevskaya (2025).	
Dickinsonia	Gen. et sp. nov.	Valid	Sprigg	Ediacaran	Australia Russia and Ukraine	A bilaterally symmetrical and ovoid fossil, originally described as a jellyfish of uncertain affinity (either of the classes Hydrozoa or Scyphozoa). The type species is D. costata.	
Ediacaria	Gen. et sp. nov.		Sprigg	Ediacaran	Australia	A discoid fossil, originally described as a scyphozoan jellyfish of uncertain affinity (either of the orders Semaeostomeae or Rhizostomeae). The type species is E. flindersi. Considered a probable junior synonym of Aspidella terranovica by Gehling, Narbonne & Anderson (2000) and Ivantsov & Zakhrevskaya (2025).	
Papilionata	Gen. et sp. nov.	Junior synonym	Sprigg	Ediacaran	Australia	A bilaterally symmetrical fossil, originally described as a jellyfish of uncertain affinity (either of the classes Hydrozoa or Scyphozoa). Synonym of Dickinsonia. The type species is P. eyrei.	
