= Ediacara, South Australia =

Ediacara
- Suburb
- Coordinates: 30°49′04″S 138°08′34″E
- Country: Australia
- State: South Australia
- Region: Far North
- LGA: Pastoral Unincorporated Area
- Location: 500 km (310 mi) N of Adelaide; 30 km (19 mi) SW of Leigh Creek
- Established: 26 April 2013

Government
  - State electorate: Stuart
  - Federal division: Grey
- Time zone: UTC+9:30 (ACST)
  - Summer (DST): UTC+10:30 (ACST)
- Postcode: 5730
Suburbs around Ediacara
Beltana Station	Beltana Station	Beltana Station
Nilpena	Ediacara	Beltana Station
Nilpena	Nilpena	Beltana Station

Ediacara /iːdiˈækərə/ is a locality in the state of South Australia, located about 500 kilometres (310 miles) north of the state capital of Adelaide and about 30 kilometres (19 miles) to the south west of the town of Leigh Creek. It includes the Nilpena Ediacara National Park, and the Ediacara Hills, which lie within that park.

== History ==
The area has a history of mining, first reported in 1888. An area became known as the Ediacara Mines after more costeans were dug. Attempts to mine the area were carried out as recently as 1967 by C.R.A. Exploration, which used diamond drilling to explore the ground, but this was abandoned after they proved fruitless. As of 2012, the area was still able to be accessed for "licensed mineral exploration or mining activities".

The locality was established on 26 April 2013 in respect to "the long established local name". Its name is derived from the use of "Ediacara" in the names of features such as Ediacara Range.

== Location and description ==
The locality of Ediacara is located about 500 kilometres (310 miles) north of the state capital of Adelaide and about 30 kilometres (19 miles) to the south west of the town of Leigh Creek.

It lies within the federal Division of Grey, the state electoral district of Stuart, the Pastoral Unincorporated Area of South Australia, and the state's Far North region.

The land use within Ediacara is mainly concerned with the protected area known as the Nilpena Ediacara National Park, which was created after the former Ediacara Conservation Park was expanded by 60,000 ha (150,000 acres) in June 2021.

== See also ==
- List of cities and towns in South Australia
