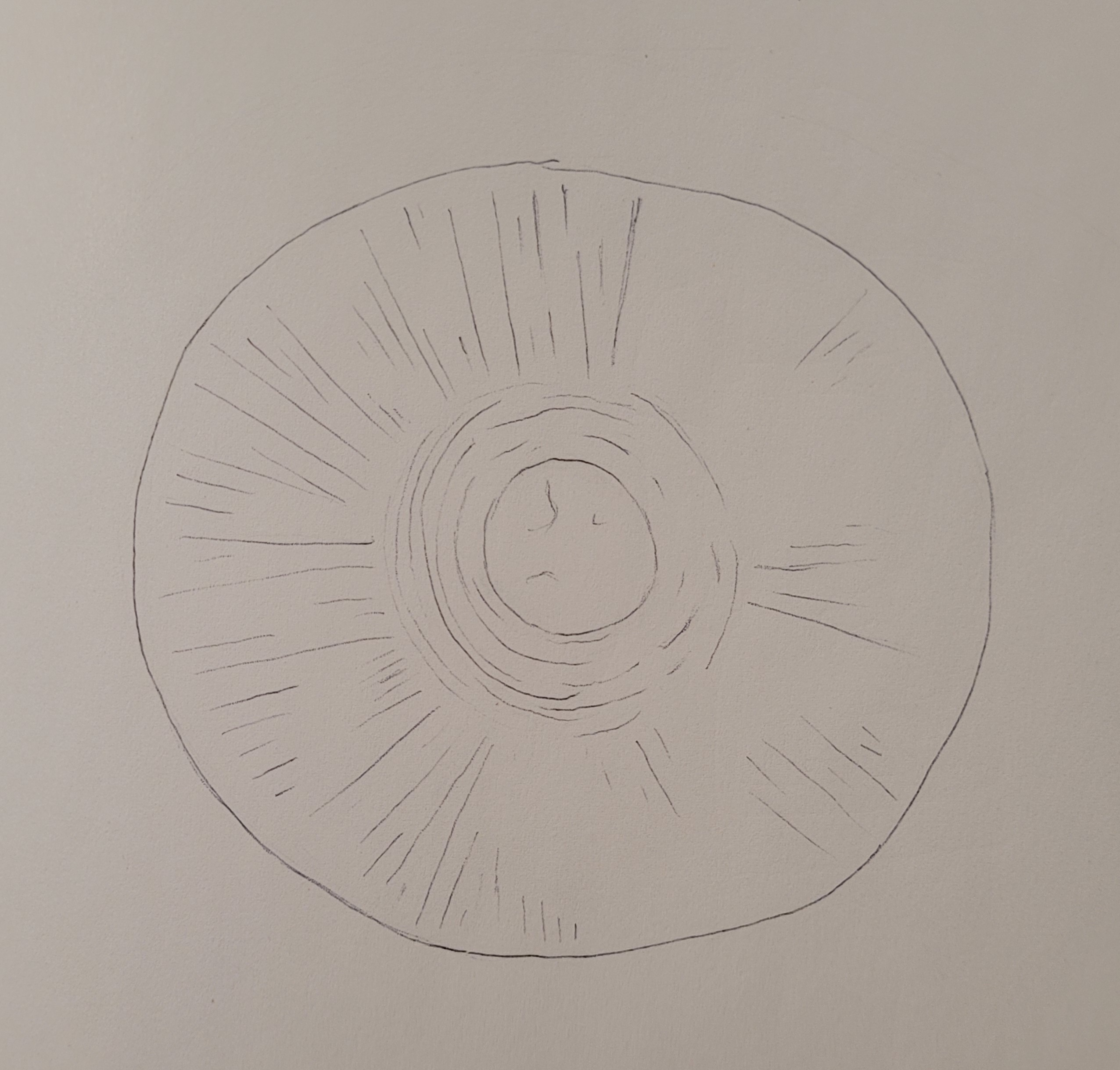

Scientific classification
- Domain: Eukaryota
- Kingdom: Animalia
- Phylum: Cnidaria
- Class: Scyphozoa
- Order: Semaeostomeae
- Genus: †Tateana; Sprigg, 1949
- Species: †T. inflata

Binomial name
- †Tateana inflata Sprigg, 1949

Synonyms
- Cyclomedusa radiata?

= Tateana =

Tateana inflata Temporal range: Ediacaran to Cambrian , around 558–500 Ma

Ediacaran-Cambrian fossil

Tateana, and more specifically Tateana inflata, is a very small, discus-like Ediacaran fossil. Its largest diameter is 6.4 mm long and it is radially symmetrical. It has very defined and thin radial striations. The main body seemed to be the main portion of the fossil, not showing signs of any limbs or appendages. Tateana has a central zone to where all the radial striations meet into the middle. The striations do not branch off of a main path and there are about 100 of them on the body.

Even though there are many similarities between Tateana and Ediacaria fossils, there are also some assets not present in Tateana, for example it is missing the common Ediacaria tendency to have branching striations. In fact, this tendency is regarded more as a Cyclomedusa trait. Tateana was originally thought to be in the Medusoids category, however, due to the Medusoid problematica, the Semaeostomeae Order was confirmed.

The discovery of Tateana inflata and other Ediacaran-Cambrian discoidal organisms caused lots of new discussions and ideas about their meaning and how to categorize them, as well as what they mean.

Tateana was discovered in South Australia. It was discovered by Reg Sprigg in the Ediacara Hills. The fossil is Pound Quartzite, Upper Adelaide Superbasin series.

Tateana was a deep sea, soft bodied organism, that most likely fed on the bio-mat.

== See also ==
- List of Ediacaran genera
