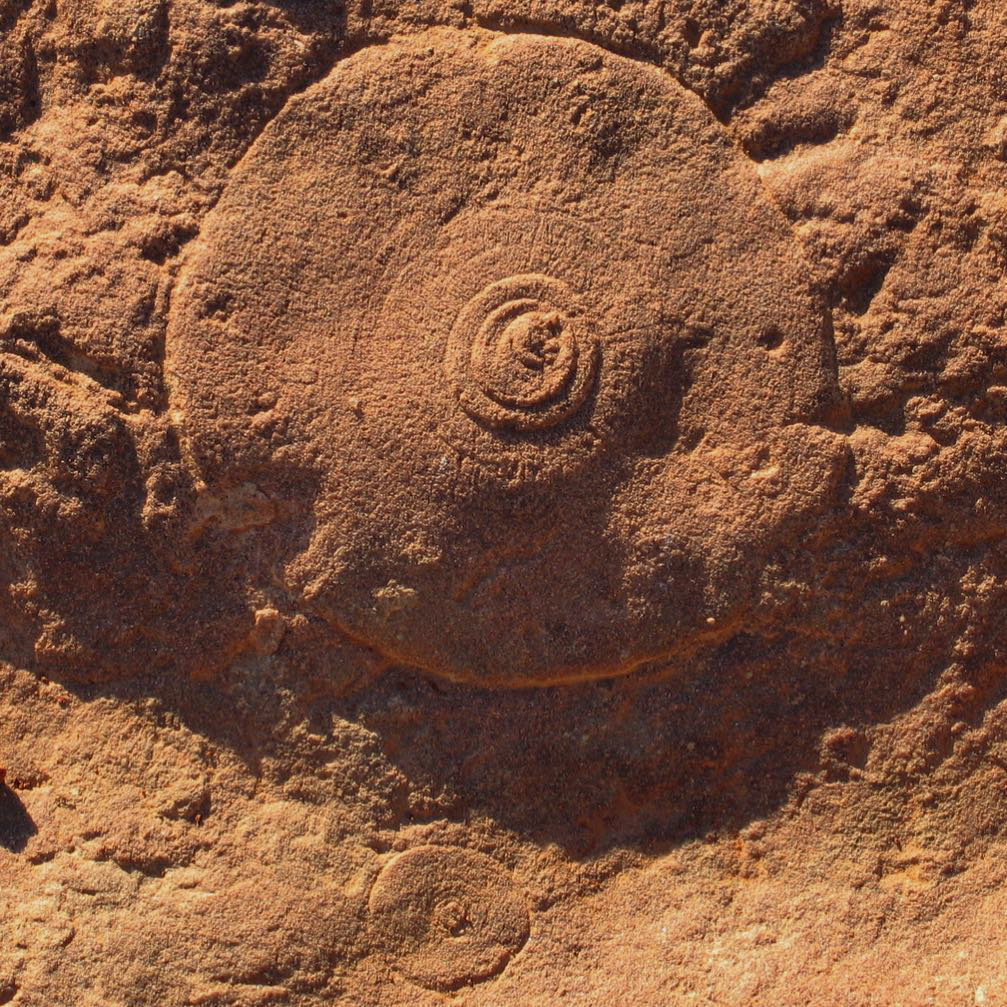
- Aspidella from the Flinders Ranges, South Australia.

Scientific classification
- Kingdom: Animalia (?)
- Genus: †Aspidella; Billings, 1872
- Species: †A. terranovica

Binomial name
- †Aspidella terranovica Billings, 1872

Synonyms
- Possibly numerous, see text.

= Aspidella =

Aspidella Temporal range: Tonian to Ediacaran, 850–555 Ma

Genus of Ediacaran animals

Aspidella is an Ediacaran disk-shaped fossil of uncertain affinity. It is known from the single species A. terranovica.

== Morphology ==
Aspidella consists of disk-shaped fossils, with concentric rings and/or centripetal rays. The diameter of circular Aspidella varies from 1 to 180 mm. Most individuals are between 4 and 10 mm, but smaller individuals would presumably have decayed before they could fossilize. Other Aspidella take the form of ellipses, 3–8 cm long and 1–4 cm wide. Most have a central pimple. The rim of all specimens is made up by ridge-edged rays and/or concentric rings.

== Ecology ==
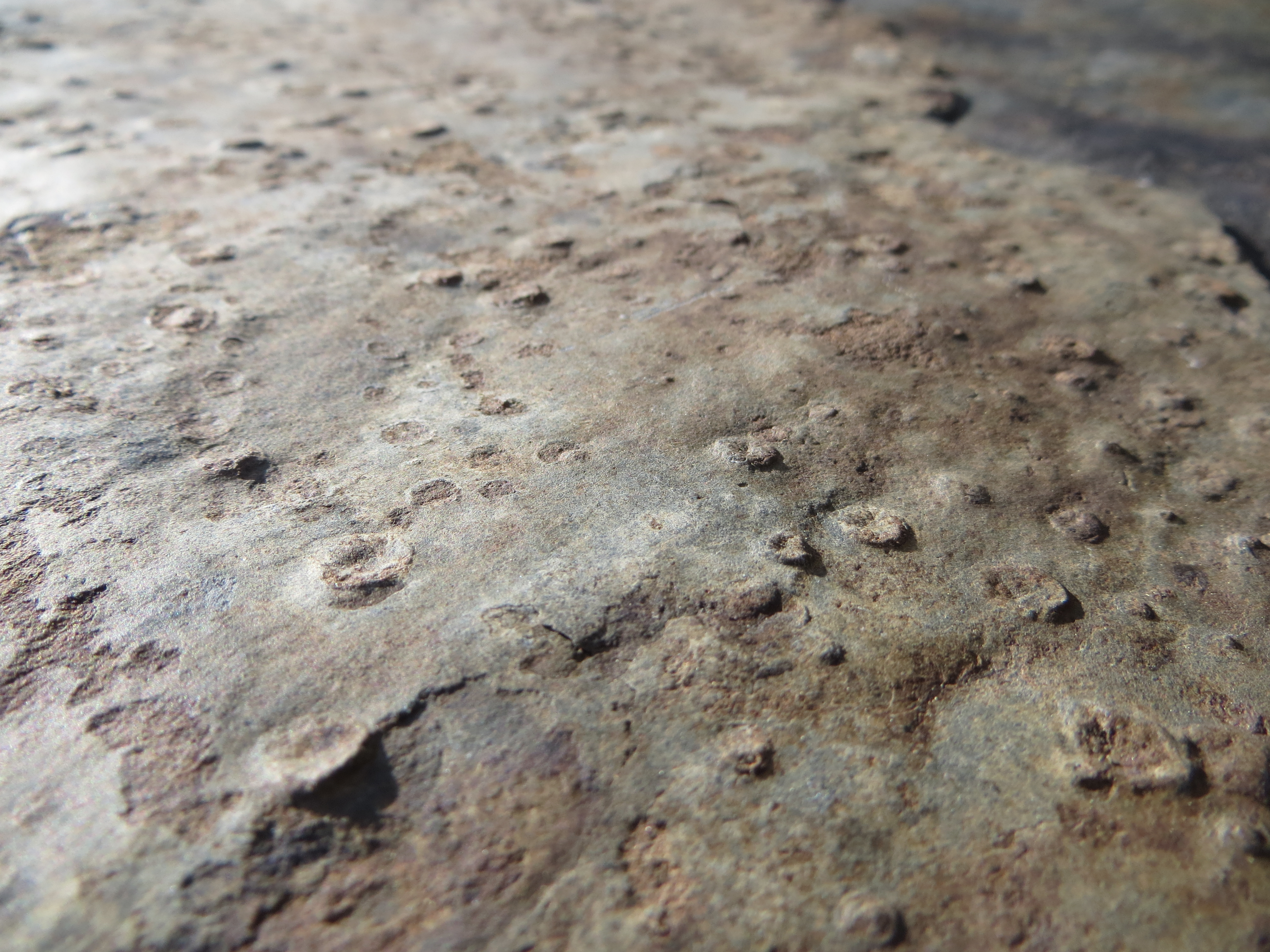
Aspidella individuals on a bedding plane in the Fermeuse Formation, Newfoundland.

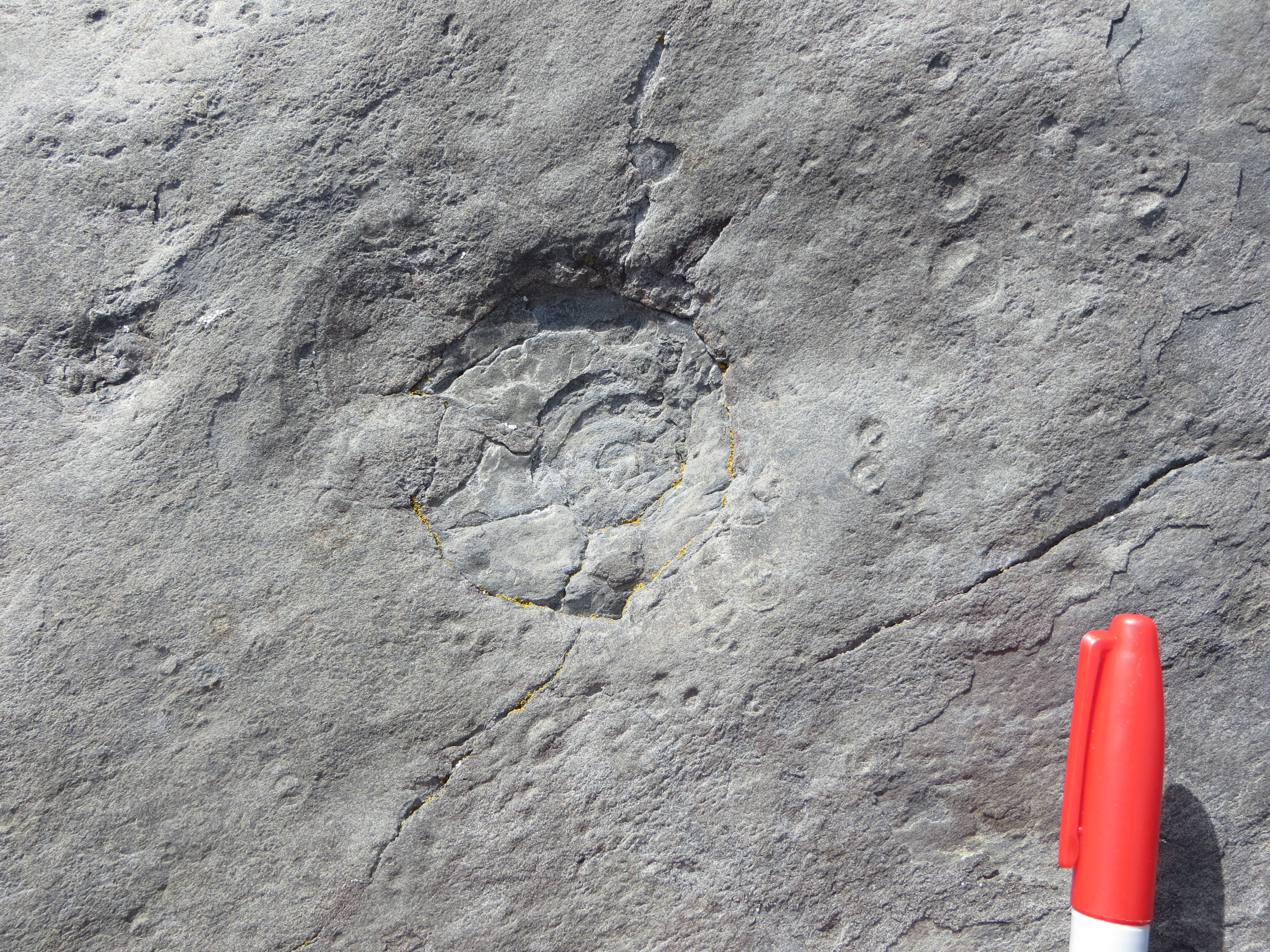
Large and small Aspidella discs on a bedding surface of the Fermeuse Formation

The rarity of large individuals probably indicates that Aspidella were r-strategists, producing numerous offspring of which most died young. It is most common in deep-water sediments, but is a constituent of most Ediacaran fossil assemblages, including those deposited above storm wave-base. The organisms can reach densities of more than 3000 per square meter.

== Affinity ==
Just like Ediacaria (see also below), Aspidella has initially been considered a scyphozoan jellyfish. This initial designation has been refuted; some specimens have been shown to be the holdfast of some organism, the main body of which extended into the open water but broke off before fossilization (a few specimens bearing stubs of stalks opposed to the central pimple support this); whereas others represent microbial colonies.

Some individuals are associated with movement trails resembling those produced by modern sea anemones (Cnidaria).

== Taphonomy ==
The upper and lower surfaces of the fossils have a distinct elemental composition that resembles that of fossilized biofilm. The sediment within the fossils also has a distinct composition, being enriched in certain elements with respect to the rock matrix. Since it is difficult to account for such a distribution of elements by post-mortem diagenetic processes, it would appear that the elements (and thus the sediment) were incorporated into the organism whilst it was alive.

== History of research ==
Aspidella terranovica was first discovered in 1868 by Scottish geologist Alexander Murray. In 1872, Elkanah Billings described Aspidella terranovica fossils from Duckworth Street, St. John's, Newfoundland (47°34′01.3″N 52°42′18.3″W). They are preserved in a Neoproterozoic outcrop of black shale. Billings was the head paleontologist with the Geological Survey of Canada at the time. Even so, his findings were questioned by Charles Doolittle Walcott, who quoted opinion that the shapes in the rocks were concretions formed inorganically. Other explanations offered at the time were that the circles were gas escape bubbles, or fakes planted by God to lure those with little faith into error. They were the first Ediacaran (Vendian) fossils described by a scientist.

For decades, Aspidella and its partner fossils were not considered to be Precambrian life forms. This lasted until the work of Reg Sprigg, who discovered the Ediacara Hills fossils. Fossils were found in many other parts of the world in rocks of about the same age and became accepted as genuine remains of life forms.

== Systematics and taxonomy ==
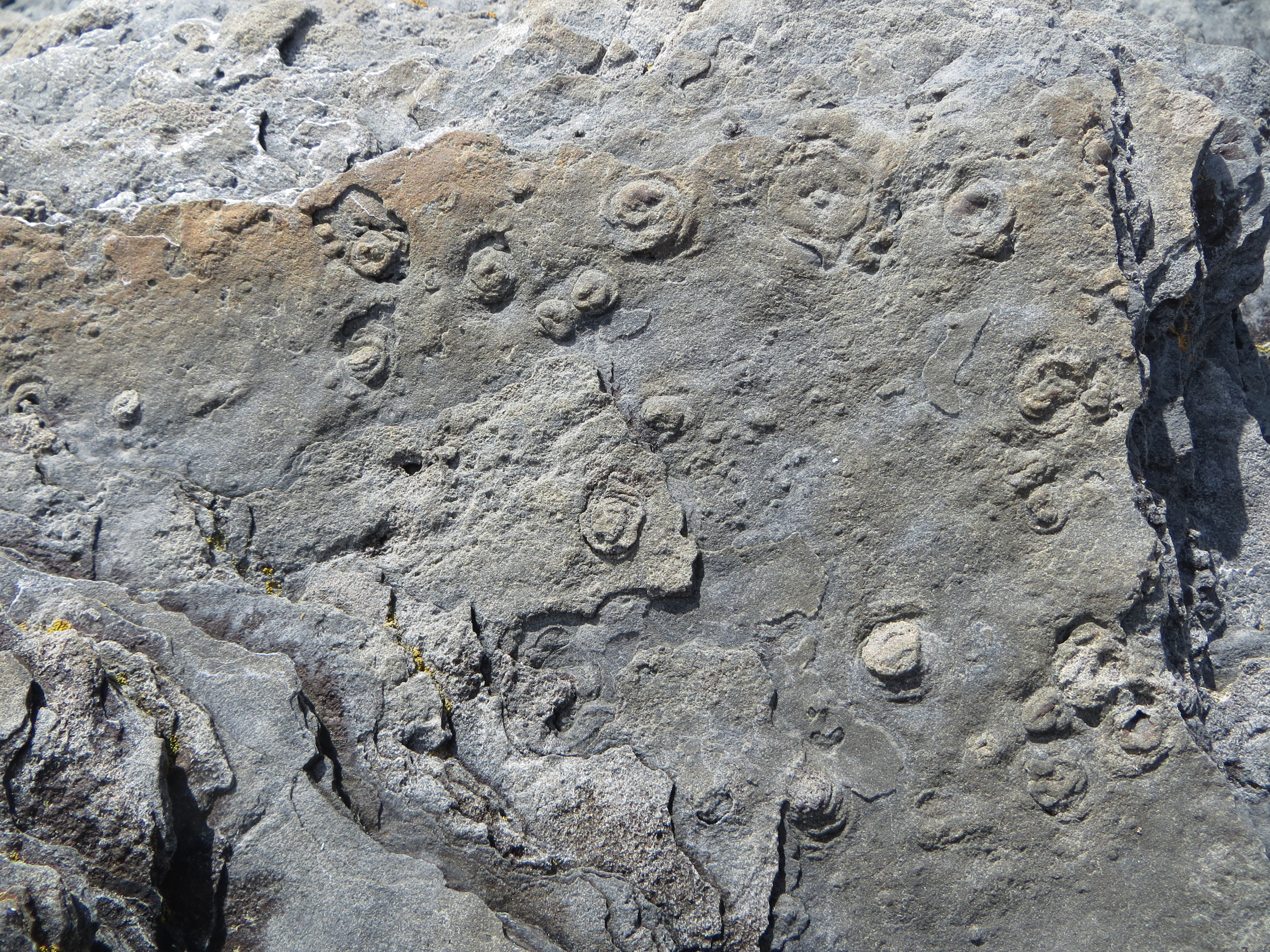
1-2 centimetre-wide Aspidella discs (and some smaller mm-sized individuals) on a bedding surface of the Fermeuse Formation near Ferryland, Newfoundland

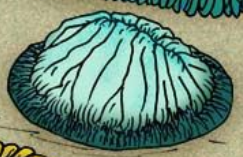
Artists interpretation of the rare Taphomorph of Aspidella, Wigwamiella enigmatica

Aspidella is derived from the Latin diminutive of Ancient Greek aspis (Ασπις, a round shield), and terranovica is Latin for "from the new land" (i.e. Newfoundland).

Different morphological forms have been called Ediacaria or Spriggia. However, the differences between the small elliptical "typical" Aspidella, the flat, ringed Spriggia wadea and the large, pimpled, and rayed Ediacaria seem to be due to different taphonomic conditions. For example, Spriggia and Ediacaria appear to be remains of the same animals, only that the former was fossilized in more compact, fine-grained clay, whereas the latter is known from rocks that originally were predominantly sandy sediment.

Numerous other taxa may also be junior synonyms of Aspidella:

Name	Authors	Year	Location
Beltanella gilesi	Sprigg	1947	South Australia
Cyclomedusa davidi	Sprigg	1947	South Australia
Cyclomedusa gigantea	Sprigg	1949	South Australia
Cyclomedusa radiata	Sprigg	1949	South Australia
Cyclomedusa plana	Glaessner et Wade	1966	South Australia
Cyclomedusa minima	Fedonkin	1981	Russia (White Sea)
Cyclomedusa delicata	Fedonkin	1981	Russia (White Sea)
Ediacaria flindersi	Sprigg	1947	South Australia
Glaessneria imperfecta	Gureev	1987	Ukraine
Irridinitus multiradiatus	Fedonkin	1983	Ukraine
Jampolium wyrzhykoowskii	Gureev	1988	Ukraine
Madigania annulata	Sprigg	1949	South Australia
Medusinites patellaris	Sokolov	1972	Ukraine
Paliella patelliformis	Fedonkin	1980	Russia (White Sea)
Paramedusium africanum	Gürich	1933	Namibia
Planomedusites patellaris	Sokolov	1972	Ukraine
Protodipleurosoma wardi	Sprigg	1949	South Australia
Protodipleurosoma rugulosum	Fedonkin	1980	Russia (White Sea)
Spriggia wadea	Sun	1986	South Australia
Tateana inflata	Sprigg	1949	South Australia
Tirasiana disciformis	Palij	1976	Ukraine
Tirasiana coniformis	Palij	1976	Ukraine
Tirasiana concentralis	Bekker	1977	Russia (Ural Mountains)
Vendella larini	Gureev	1987	Ukraine

Due to its nondescript nature, Aspidella might be considered a form taxon, an artificial assemblage of similar-looking and similar-living organisms without a phylogenetic relationship. In this case, some presumed synonyms (such as Ediacaria or Cyclomedusa) would remain valid. The type specimens were of the ellipsoid type (they are lost, but a cast remains). Thus, if Aspidella in the loose sense turns out to be an assemblage of more or less related taxa, the genus name would apply only to the smallish ellipsoid specimens. Regardless of its ultimate classification, because it has been classified as either an animal, or a plant (alga), or a fungus (lichen), the name Aspidella is covered by both Codes of Nomenclature, and this prevents adoption of a later homonym "Aspidella" (Gilbert 1940) for a group of extant mushrooms, now renamed Saproamanita.

== Occurrence ==
Other locations where Aspidella specimens are reported include the Bonavista Peninsula and Mistaken Point in Newfoundland, the Twitya Formation in British Columbia, and central North Carolina.

Aspidella fossils are found from 610 to 555 million years ago, with putative representatives dating to 770 million years ago.

More recently, Aspidella fossils have been found in the mid-Tonian-aged Heavitree Formation, Amadeus Basin, Central Australia, dated to ~ 850 million years ago.

== See also ==
- List of Ediacaran genera
