= Warrioota =

Pastoral lease in South Australia

Coordinates: 30.869°S 138.1265°E

Location in South Australia

Warrioota Station is a pastoral lease that operates as a sheep station in South Australia. It is situated about 40 kilometres (25 mi) south west of Leigh Creek and 58 kilometres (36 mi) north west of Blinman. The property shares a boundary with Nilpena Station and abuts Lake Torrens. The landscape consists of undulating saltbush and sandhill country interspersed with grassed flats.

== History ==
In 1913 the property was owned by W. L. Whyte and Peter Whyte, who both died the same year. The executors of their wills sold the 69,120-acre (27,972 ha) property to Walter Henry McFarlane. McFarlane placed it up for auction in 1920 when it was stocked with about 2,000 sheep and 270 cattle. T. H. Pearse of the Gums Station bought Warrioota for £10,000. Pearse appointed William Place as the station manager later the same year. The area had been going through a dry spell for the past few years but in 1921 the rains came with 5 inches (127 mm) falling in a single day. Pearse reported that abundant feed was available for stock by April of that year.

Grant Matheson purchased Warrioota from Pearse in 1923 for £11,000. Matheson also owned the adjoining property Nilpena station. Warrioota occupied an area of 112 square miles (290 km^{2}) and was stocked with 1,800 sheep and 300 cattle. Wild dogs had become troublesome so Matheson intended to construct many miles of vermin-proof fencing on the northern boundary. Matheson still owned the property in 1926, along with neighbouring Nilpena Station, which together occupied an area of 350 square miles (906 km^{2}). He was running about 15,000 sheep across the two properties.

The Nilpena Pastoral Company put both Nilpena and Warrioota up for auction in 1947 as one lot. The properties had a total area of 341 square miles (883 km^{2}). The properties were divided into 14 sheep paddocks and watered by six wells and three bores. Both the stone homestead at Nilpena and the weatherboard homestead at Warrioota were included in the sale.

== See also ==
- List of ranches and stations
