= 5380 Sprigg =

Asteroid

Discovery
- Discovered by: R. H. McNaught
- Discovery site: Siding Spring Obs.
- Discovery date: 7 May 1991

Designations
- Named after: Reg Sprigg (Australian geologist)
- Alternative designations: 1991 JT · 1983 JN; 1983 LA_{1}
- Minor planet category: main-belt · (middle) background

Orbital characteristics
- Epoch 4 September 2017 (JD 2458000.5)
- Uncertainty parameter 0
- Observation arc: 35.92 yr (13,118 days)
- Aphelion: 3.1229 AU
- Perihelion: 2.0357 AU
- Semi-major axis: 2.5793 AU
- Eccentricity: 0.2108
- Orbital period (sidereal): 4.14 yr (1,513 days)
- Mean anomaly: 102.71°
- Mean motion: 0° 14^{m} 16.44^{s} / day
- Inclination: 9.3019°
- Longitude of ascending node: 242.31°
- Argument of perihelion: 358.90°

Physical characteristics
- Dimensions: 6.606±0.290 km 12.75 km (calculated)
- Synodic rotation period: 3.219±0.002 h
- Geometric albedo: 0.057 (assumed); 0.280±0.025
- Spectral type: X · C
- Absolute magnitude (H): 12.9 · 13.03±0.32 · 13.2

5380 Sprigg, provisional designation 1991 JT, is a background asteroid from the middle regions of the asteroid belt, approximately 7 kilometers (4.3 miles) in diameter. It was discovered on 7 May 1991, by Australian astronomer Robert McNaught at Siding Spring Observatory in New South Wales, Australia. It was named after Australian geologist Reg Sprigg.

== Orbit and classification ==
Sprigg is a non-family asteroid from the main belt's background population. It orbits the Sun in the central asteroid belt at a distance of 2.0–3.1 AU once every 4 years and 2 months (1,513 days). Its orbit has an eccentricity of 0.21 and an inclination of 9° with respect to the ecliptic. A first precovery was taken at Palomar Observatory in 1980, extending the body's observation arc by 11 years prior to its official discovery observation at Siding Spring.

== Naming ==
This minor planet was named after Reg Sprigg (1919–1994), Australian exploration geologist, oceanographer, biologist, author and conservationist. In 1946, he discovered the pre-Cambrian Ediacara biota, an assemblage of some of the most ancient animal fossils known. He is also the founder of the Arkaroola Wilderness Sanctuary which also hosts a small observatory. The naming was proposed by astronomer Duncan Steel. Naming citation was prepared by the Sprigg family and published on 11 April 1998 (M.P.C. 31609).

== Physical characteristics ==
Sprigg has been classified as an X-type asteroid by Pan-STARRS photometric survey.

=== Rotation period ===
A rotational lightcurve of Sprigg was obtained from photometric observations by astronomer Maurice Clark at Texas Tech University in October 2013. Lightcurve analysis gave a rotation period of 3.219 hours with a brightness amplitude of 0.68 magnitude, indicating that the body has a non-spheroidal shape (U=3-).

=== Diameter and albedo ===
According to the survey carried out by NASA's Wide-field Infrared Survey Explorer with its subsequent NEOWISE mission, Sprigg measures 6.606 kilometers in diameter and its surface has an albedo of 0.280, while the Collaborative Asteroid Lightcurve Link assumes a standard albedo for carbonaceous asteroids of 0.057 and calculates a larger diameter of 12.75 kilometers with an absolute magnitude of 13.2.
