= Spriggite =

General
- Category: Uranyl hydroxide mineral
- Formula: Pb_{3}(UO_{2})_{6}O_{8}(OH)_{2}·3H_{2}O
- IMA symbol: Sgg
- Strunz classification: 4.GC.15
- Crystal system: Monoclinic
- Crystal class: Prismatic (2/m) (same H-M symbol)
- Space group: C2/c

Identification
- Color: bright orange
- Cleavage: distinct/ good on (100)
- Fracture: irregular/ uneven
- Tenacity: brittle
- Mohs scale hardness: 4
- Luster: vitreous
- Streak: pale orange
- Diaphaneity: transparent

Spriggite is an uranyl hydroxide mineral with chemical formula Pb_{3}(UO_{2})_{6}O_{8}(OH)_{2}·3H_{2}O. Its type locality is Mt Painter region, Arkaroola region, Flinders Ranges, South Australia. It was named after Reginald C. Sprigg (1919–1994).
