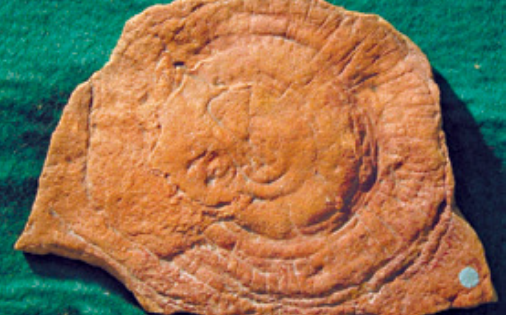

Scientific classification
- Domain: Eukaryota
- Clade: incertae sedis
- Genus: †Ediacaria; Sprigg, 1947

Type species
- Ediacaria flindersi Sprigg, 1947

Species
- Ediacaria booleyi Crimes et al., 1995 (biogenic?); Ediacaria flindersi Sprigg, 1947

Synonyms
- Protodipleurosoma Sprigg, 1949

= Ediacaria =

Ediacaria Temporal range: Tonian–Drumian

Genus of cnidarians

Ediacaria is a nomen dubium fossil genus dating to the Ediacaran Period of the Neoproterozoic Era. Unlike most Ediacaran biota, which disappeared almost entirely from the fossil record at the end of the Period, Ediacaria fossils have been found dating from the Baikalian age (850–650 Ma) of the Upper Riphean to 501 million years ago, well into the Cambrian Period. Ediacaria consists of concentric rough circles, radial lines between the circles and a central dome, with a diameter from 1 to 70 cm.

== Systematics and taxonomy ==
Ediacaria was named by Reg Sprigg in 1947, after the Ediacara Hills in South Australia. Two species are recognised: E. flindersi, described by Sprigg from the Pound Quartzite in the Ediacara Hills, and E. booleyi, described in 1995 from a Late Cambrian deposit at Booley Bay (County Wexford), Ireland. The species were named after the Flinders Ranges and Booley Bay, respectively.

Ediacaria is possibly a synonym for Aspidella terranovica described in 1872. Although Ediacaria is one of the first described organisms from the Precambrian, Aspidella was described earlier, although its age was not understood to be Precambrian. As Aspidella is apparently a form taxon, Ediacaria may yet be valid and denote one specific genus among several that seem to make up Aspidella. Spriggia wadea is quite likely a synonym of Ediacaria (and consequently, possibly Aspidella); the differences seem to be merely due to different substrate in which the animals were embedded. (Gehling et al. 2000)

Ediacaria was often classified as a jellyfish (a Scyphozoan Cnidarian), and has also been interpreted in many of the categories postulated to house the Ediacaran biota. A conspicuous filamentous microstructure preserved in some pyritised specimens suggests that it may have been a microbial colony, which disrupted the surrounding microbial mat to create the distinctive pattern (Grazhdankin, 2007).

== See also ==
- List of Ediacaran genera

== Notes ==
- Gehling, James G.; Narbonne, Guy M.; Anderson, Michael M. (2000). "The first named Ediacaran body fossil, Aspidella terranovica". Palaeontology. 43 (3): 427–456. doi:10.1111/j.0031-0239.2000.00134.x.
- Grazhdankin, D. (8 November 2001). Microbial origin of some of the Ediacaran fossils. GSA Annual Meeting, November 5–8, 2001. Art. Paper 177-0. Boston, Massachusetts. Event occurs at 2:45 PM. Archived from the original on 11 September 2014.
- Grazhdankin, D.; Gerdes, G. (2007). "Ediacaran microbial colonies". Lethaia. 40 (3): 201–210. doi:10.1111/j.1502-3931.2007.00025.x.
- Lindsley-Griffin, Nancy; Griffin, John R.; Farmer, Jack D. (9 May 2006). Paleogeographic links between Yreka Terrane (Klamath Mountains, Northern California) and Alaska's Nixon Fork and Alexander Terranes. 102nd Annual Meeting of the Cordilleran Section, GSA, 81st Annual Meeting of the Pacific Section, AAPG, and the Western Regional Meeting of the Alaska Section, SPE (8–10 May 2006). Art. Paper 24-6. Anchorage, Alaska. Event occurs at 3:30 PM-3:50 PM. Archived from the original on 2012-02-04.
- Pickerill, R.K. (1982). "Cambrian Medusoids from the St. John Group, southwestern New Brunswick". Geological Survey of Canada Current Research Part B. 82 (1): 71–76.
- Sprigg, R.C. (1947). "Early Cambrian(?) Jellyfishes from the Flinders Ranges, South Australia" (PDF). Transactions of the Royal Society of South Australia. 71: 212–224. Archived from the original (PDF) on 29 September 2007.
- Stasinska, A. (1960). "Velumbrella czarnockii n. gen., n. sp. - Meduse du Cambrien Inferieur des Monts de Sainte-Croix". Acta Palaeontologica Polonica. 5: 337–346.
- Vanguestaine, Michel & Brück, Peter (2005): A Middle Cambrian age for the Ediacara-type fauna from the Booley Bay Formation, County Wexford, Ireland: new acritarch data and their implications. In: Steemans, P. & Javaux, E. (eds.): Pre-Cambrian to Palaeozoic Palaeopalynology and Palaeobotany. Carnets de Géologie / Notebooks on Geology, Memoir 2005/02, Abstract 11 PDF fulltext
