= Nilpena Ediacara National Park =

National park in South Australia

- IUCN category VI (protected area with sustainable use of natural resources)
- Location within South Australia
- Location: South Australia
- Nearest city: Leigh Creek
- Coordinates: 30°48′20.52″S 138°8′5.28″E
- Established: 11 November 1993
- Governing body: Department for Environment and Water
- Website: Official website

Nilpena Ediacara National Park, which includes the former Ediacara Conservation Park, is a national park located in the northern Flinders Ranges, in the state of South Australia. It is significant for its abundance of Ediacaran fossils, so named because of their discovery in the Ediacara Hills. It is located about around 551 km (342 mi) north of the city of Adelaide, around 30 kilometres (19 miles) south-west of the town of Leigh Creek in the state's Far North, and lies on the traditional lands of the Adnyamathanha people.

The Flinders Ranges Ediacara Foundation was established in 2018 with a charter to protect the unique fossils. The park, which includes the Ediacara Hills and covers 60,617 hectares (149,790 acres), was proclaimed in June 2021, and opened in April 2023. The park and the fossils are of major significance to the bid for UNESCO World Heritage Listing for the Flinders Ranges.

== Etymology ==
The name "Ediacara" has a disputed origin from one of the Aboriginal languages near the Flinders Range area. It is first known to have been used during the middle of the 19th century. Earlier Australian sources suggested that the "name 'Ediacara' or 'Idiyakra' may be derived from an Indigenous term associating it with a place near water". (Note: The name "Idiyakra", or "Ediacara", is Australian Aboriginal in origin and can be traced back to 1859 or a little earlier, when the first white pastoralists took up lands in the far north western Flinders Ranges. Its etymology links it to a place where water is or was present close by or about, either in the sense of the present or extending distantly into past wetter times. As water is synonymous with life in the harsh, arid lands of Australia, it is a fitting name for a time when the first megascopic marine animals evolved. As the records of early surveyors and State Parliamentary records show, the ending of the name sounded as a 'kra', 'ker', or 'ka', and hence the appropriate name of the Period is 'Ediacaran'. — R.J.F. Jenkins (unpublished note, 2003))

Another theory suggests that the term may be a mispronunciation of the two words "Yata Takarra", meaning hard or stony ground ("in reference to the flat Ediacara plateau of dolomite that forms the centre of the Ediacara syncline"). Supporting this latter contention, it has been argued that the word "has nothing in it that corresponds to any word for water in any of the local languages" and that local tradition "has it that the name meant 'granite plain', but, since there appears to be no igneous rock in the area, this could well refer to the hardness of the ground, rather than to its geological composition".

Ediacara may have been derived from the Adnyamathanha language name "Ithiaka-na-danha", where Ithi means zebra finch and aka-na-danha means "to come out", which is used as the name for the area in which the conservation park was located. Adnyamathanha woman Beverley Patterson, who had heard stories since childhood about the fossils, said shortly before the opening of the national park in April 2023 that Ediacara was the Adnyamathanha word for the zebra finch, a bird endemic to the area.

However, there are a number of complications in trying to establish the origins of place names supposedly relating to Aboriginal words, and there is no definitive answer for Ediacara.

== History ==
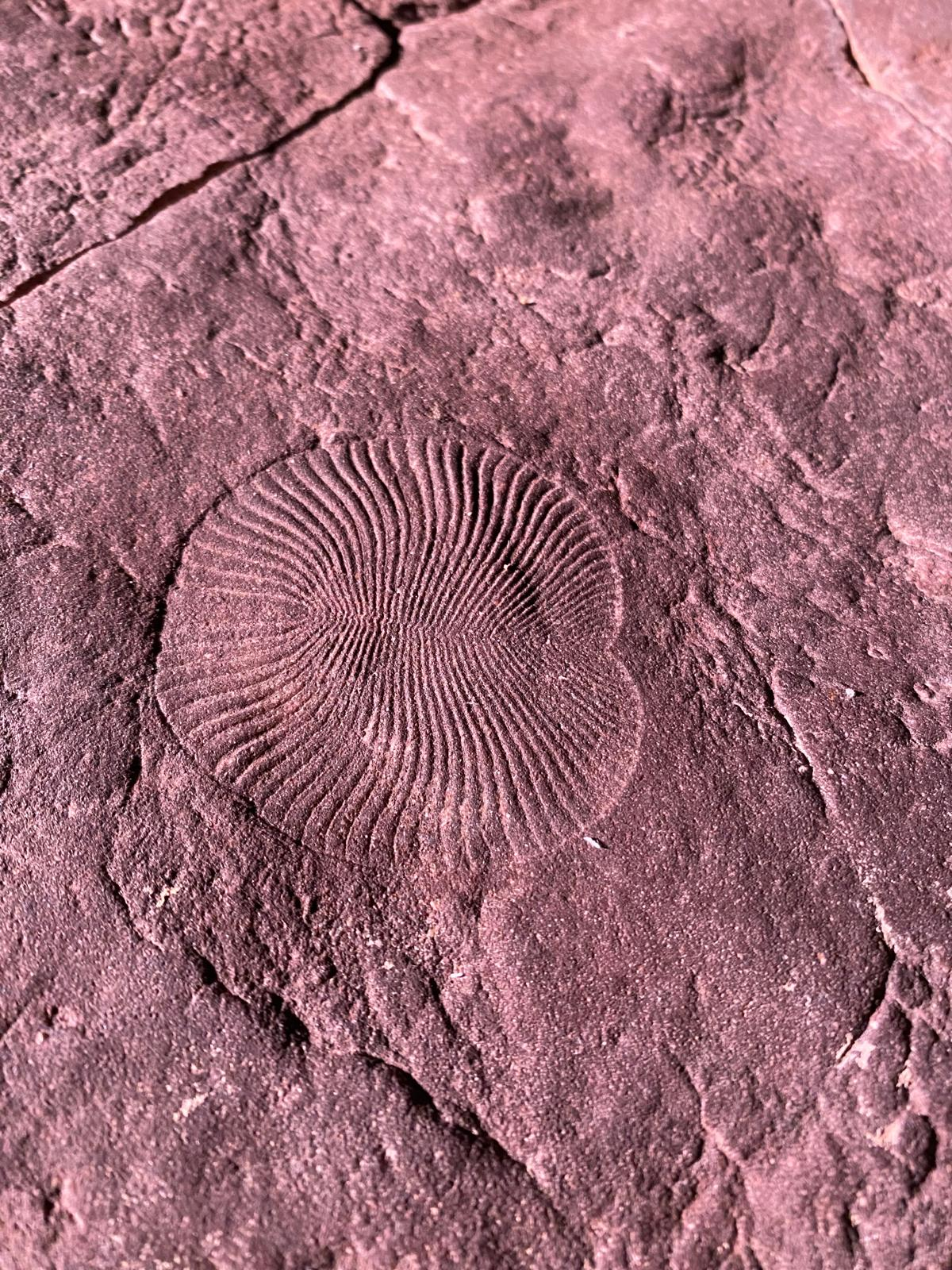
A great number of Dickinsonia fossils can be observed in situ within the park

Geologist Reg Sprigg discovered fossils in the Ediacara Hills in 1946, among them, the first evidence of an animal with a head, which is unique to the Flinders Ranges. The genus was named Spriggina, after Sprigg. The find of these animal fossils was significant as a "missing link" in the evolution of life on earth. Charles Darwin had not come across this class of animals, which inhabited the earth around 550 million years ago, now named Ediacaran biota. These animals somewhat resembled modern-day sea anemones or sea worms, and provide the link between unicellular organisms and the hard-bodied, predatory animals of the "Cambrian explosion".

American palaeontologist Mary L. Droser and her family have travelled frequently from their home near Los Angeles to study the fossils on property that was part of Nilpena Station, from around 2001 onwards. South Australian Museum palaeontologist Diego Garcia-Bellido and his team has also been studying the fossils, and hopes that cores extracted by them will reveal the exact age of the fossils by around 2026.

In 2018, the Flinders Ranges Ediacara Foundation was established with a charter to protect the unique fossils. The foundation works in partnership with land managers, researchers, institutions, along with the traditional owners (the Adnyamathanha people) and wider community of the area to ensure that the fossils are managed well, remain accessible to the public, and inspire future generations of scientists.

The Ediacara Conservation Park was proclaimed under the National Parks and Wildlife Act 1972 on 26 April 2007 over land previously declared as a conservation reserve under the Crown Lands Act 1929 in 1993 and as a fossil reserve in 1958.

On 28 March 2019, the Government of South Australia purchased two-thirds (60,000 hectares (150,000 acres)) of the adjacent cattle station, Nilpena Station, from the Fargher family, to enlarge the conservation park by ten times. The land, formerly owned by the Nilpena Pastoral Company, extends as far as Lake Torrens National Park. It is on this land that some of the most valuable fossils were found.

The entire area was reclassified as a national park and proclaimed as Nilpena Ediacara National Park on 17 June 2021. A visitor hub and Ediacara Fossil experience were planned and development started in 2021.

The national park was opened on 27 April 2023. In August 2025, the rest of Nilpena Station was sold to the government, enlarging the area of the national park and ensuring that the fossils are protected.

== Description ==
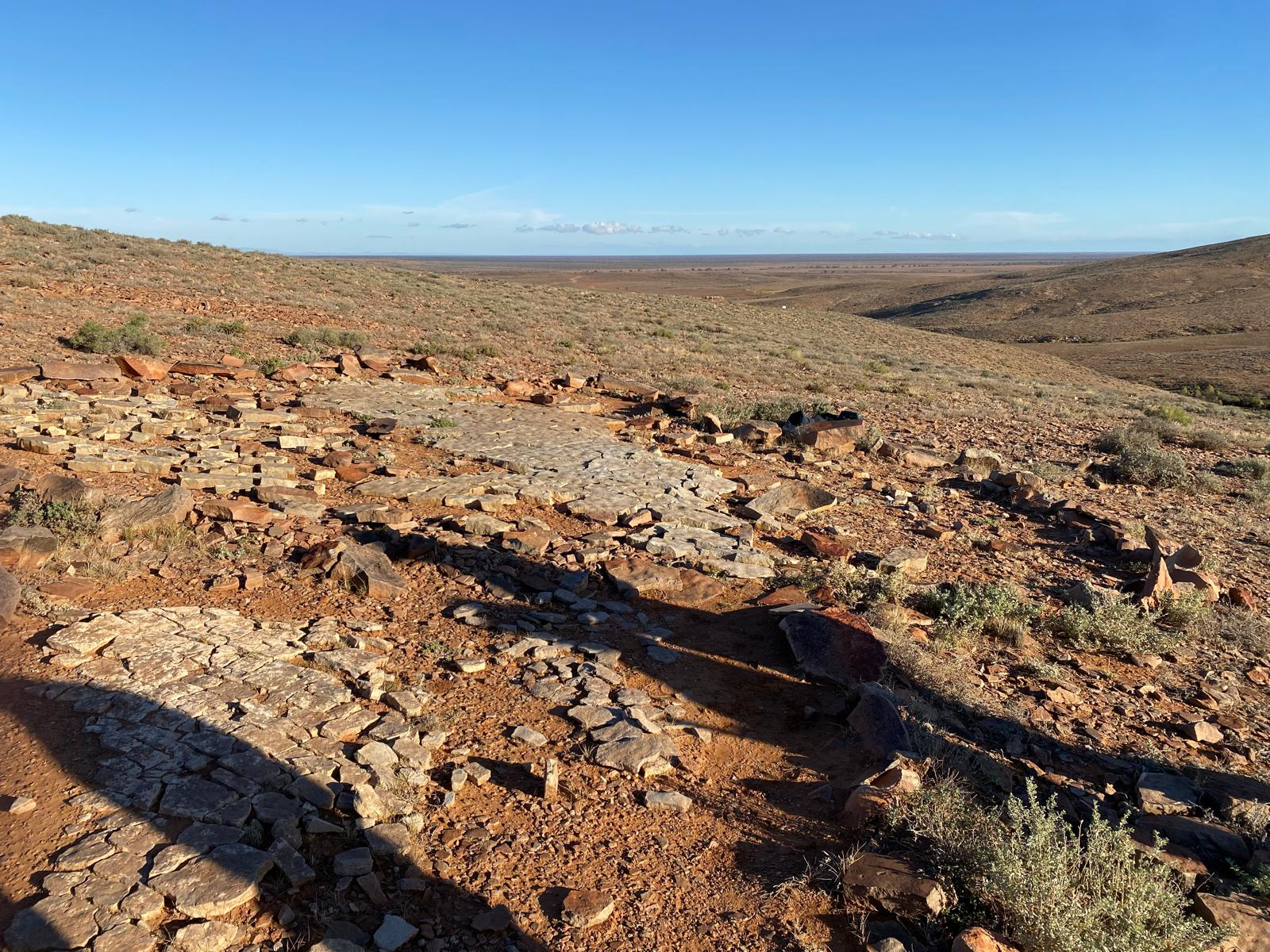
Fossil bed at Nilpena Ediacara National Park

The national park lies around 551 km (342 mi) north of the city of Adelaide, to the east of Lake Torrens National Park, about 30 kilometres (19 miles) and south-west of the town of Leigh Creek.

The conservation park was originally created to protect and conserve an "assemblage of fossilised Ediacaran soft-bodied marine organisms of international importance", "places of significance" to the Adnyamathanha people, "remnants of mining history associated with the Ediacara mineral field", and an "important chenopod habitat". It was classified as an IUCN Category VI protected area. The fossil reserve is also listed on the South Australian Heritage Register.

Since its opening as a national park in April 2023, Ross and Jane Fargher, who have been working with Jason Irving, head of the national parks program, for seven years, are acting as caretakers of the fossil beds until a ranger is appointed.

The fossils are of international significance, being the most extensive examples of Ediacaran fossils in the world, although others exist in other places, including Namibia and Russia. The park is one of a group of seven geographically separate areas that are part of the Flinders Ranges geological successions where abundant and diverse arrays of fossils show how animal life began on Earth over a period of 350 million years. These areas were submitted to the UNESCO World Heritage Centre for consideration as a World Heritage Site under criterion (viii) on 15 April 2021, and as of August 2025 remain on the "tentative" list. A 1947 study by Reg Sprigg and two 1949 studies by Sir Douglas Mawson are cited to support the application, along with research by Mary Droser and others. The nomination will be voted on in 2026.

While it is possible to observe these fossils on site, this can only be done through a guided "Fossil Field Exploration Tour", which runs several days a week during the cooler months of the year.

== See also ==
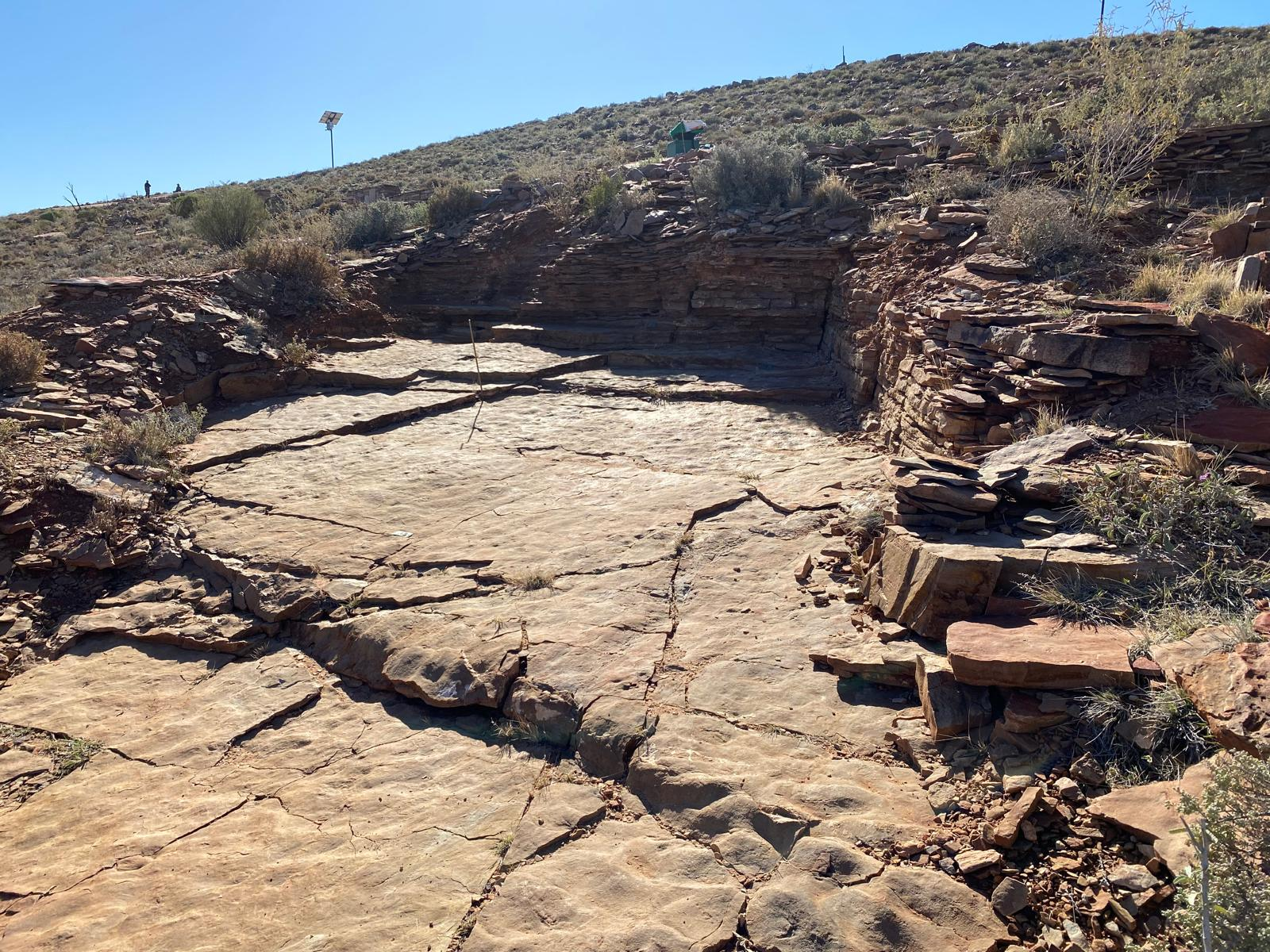
A fossil bed which has been partially excavated (note the camera in the top left)

- Australian National Heritage List
- Protected areas of South Australia
- List of fossil parks
