= Bruno Granier =

- Born: Bruno R.C. Granier
- Occupation: Professor of Geology at the University of Brest (France)
- Known for: Author of over 90 scientific papers, editor of the open access electronic journal

Bruno R.C. Granier is Professor of Geology at the University of Brest (France) (also locally referred to as the Université de Bretagne Occidentale), a post he held in 2004. He is the author of over 90 scientific papers.

He is also editor of the open access electronic journal Carnets de Géologie, associate editor of PALAIOS and the manager of the internet website Geoscience e-Journals. From 2007 to 2011 he was president of the French Committee of Stratigraphy; accordingly, he organized the 4th French meeting on Stratigraphy, STRATI2010.

His fields of interest are sequence stratigraphy, carbonate sedimentology, diagenesis, stratigraphy, rock-typing and micropaleontology (particularly on the study of fossil calcareous algae). He teaches undergraduate courses in field geology, sedimentology and micropaleontology.

== Bibliographic references ==
=== Monographs ===
- Moullade M., Tronchetti G. & Granier B., eds. (2009), "Ammonites, microfaunes, stratonomie et géochimie de l'Aptien-type". Annales du Muséum d'Histoire naturelle de Nice, Tome XXV, fasc. 1, 394 p.
- Lipps J.H. & Granier B., eds. (2009), PaleoParks - The protection and conservation of fossil sites worldwide. Carnets de Géologie / Notebooks on Geology , Brest, Book 2009/03, 133 p.
- Berger S., Granier B. & Bonotto S. (2004), "Dasycladales". Research publications from the beginning until the year 2000. Koeltz Scientific Books, CD-ROM, ISBN 3-906166-12-0, 085310, 373 p.
- Granier B. (1988), "Algues Chlorophyceae du Jurassique terminal et du Crétacé inférieur en Alicante". Mediterranea, '5 (1986), p. 5-96.
- Granier B. & Grgasović T. (2000), - "Les Algues Dasycladales du Permien et du Trias. Nouvelle tentative d'inventaire bibliographique, géographique et stratigraphique". Geologia Croatica, 53/1, p. 1-197.

=== Articles in scientific journals (a short list) ===
- Barattolo F., Granier B., Romano R. & Ferré B. (2008), Petrascula iberica (Dragastan & Trappe), Tersella genotii Barattolo & Bigozzi, and the relationships of club-shaped dasycladalean algae during Late Triassic-Early Jurassic times. Geologia Croatica, 61/2-3, p. 159-176.
- Bucur I.I., Munnecke A., Granier B. & Yan J. (2009), "Remarks on the Permian dasycladalean alga" Sinoporella leei Yabe, 1949. Geobios, 42/2, p. 221-231.
- Deloffre R. & Granier B. (1991), "Hypothèse phylogénique des Algues Dasycladales". Comptes-Rendus de l'Académie des Sciences, (II), 312, p. 1673-1676.
- Deloffre R. & Granier B. (1993), "Inventaire des Algues Dasycladales fossiles. I° partie - Les Algues Dasycladales du Tertiaire". Revue de Paléobiologie, 11/2 (1992), p. 331-356.
- Granier B. (1987), "Révision de Likanella campanensis" Azéma & Jaffrezo, 1972, "Algue Dasycladacée du Crétacé inférieur du Sud-Est de l'Espagne". Revue de Paléobiologie, 6/2, p. 207-212.
- Granier B. (1989), "Zergabriella, un nouveau genre d'Algue Dasycladale du Portlandien-Valanginien". Revue de Micropaléontologie, 32/2, p. 126-133.
- Granier B. (1990), "The case of the genus Radoiciciella, Dasycladalean Algae from the Tethyan Upper Jurassic and Lower Cretaceous". Comunicaçoes dos Serviços geológicos de Portugal, 75, p. 29-37.
- Granier B. (1992), "Les Algues et Foraminifères benthiques du Jurassique supérieur et du Crétacé inférieur du Sénégal". Journal of African Earth Sciences, 14/2, p. 239-253.
- Granier B. (1995), "The genus Actinoporella (Gümbel in Alth, 1881) and its representatives. A review". Proceedings of the International Symposium and Field-Meeting Alpine Algae '93. Beiträge zur Paläontologie, 19 (1994), p. 113-127.
- Granier B. (2002), Algues Dasycladales, nouvelles ou peu connues, du Jurassique supérieur et du Crétacé inférieur du Moyen-Orient. In: Bucur I.I. & Filipescu S. (eds.), Research advances in calcareous algae and microbial carbonates. Proceedings of the 4th IFAA Regional Meeting (Cluj-Napoca, August 29 - September 5, 2001), Presa Universitara Clujeana, p. 103-113.
- Granier B., Ait Sliman M. A. & Fedan B. (1997), Triploporella ? atlasica n. sp., une Dasycladacée (Algue verte) du Paléocène-Eocène de l'Atlas moyen, Maroc. Revue de Paléobiologie, 16/1, p. 47-53.
- Granier B., Ait Sliman M.A. & Fedan B. (2002), Validation de l'espèce Triploporella atlasica Granier, Ait Sliman et Fedan, non 1997. In: Bucur I.I. & Filipescu S. (eds.), Research advances in calcareous algae and microbial carbonates. Proceedings of the 4th IFAA Regional Meeting (Cluj-Napoca, August 29 - September 5, 2001), Presa Universitara Clujeana, p. 115-116.
- Granier B. & Berthou P.Y. (1994), Description de Milanovicella momciliana n.gen. n.sp., Algue Dasycladale du Portlandien de l'Algarve central (Portugal), et validation de quelques taxons affins. Revue de Micropaléontologie, 37/2, p. 113-121.
- Granier B. & Berthou P.Y. (2002), Algues calcaires fossiles, nouvelles ou peu connues, du Portugal. 1ère partie. In: Bucur I.I. & Filipescu S. (eds.), Research advances in calcareous algae and microbial carbonates. Proceedings of the 4th IFAA Regional Meeting (Cluj-Napoca, August 29 - September 5, 2001), Presa Universitara Clujeana, p. 117-126.
- Granier B., Berthou P.Y. & Fourcade E. (1991), The Dasycladalean Algae from the Cretaceous of the New World. Transactions of the second geological Conference of the geological Society of Trinidad and Tobago, April 2–8, 1990, p. 178-183.
- Granier B., Berthou P.-Y. & Poignant A.F. (1991), Constructions bio-sédimentaires laminées, Lithothamnium et Parachaetetes de la Formation Riachuelo (Albien) du bassin de Sergipe (Nord-Est du Brésil). Geociências, 10, p. 169-181.
- Granier B. & Braik F. (2002), Thyrsoporella pseudoperplexa n. sp., une Dasycladacée (algue verte calcaire) du Jurassique supérieur téthysien. In: Bucur I.I. & Filipescu S. (eds.), Research advances in calcareous algae and microbial carbonates. Proceedings of the 4th IFAA Regional Meeting (Cluj-Napoca, August 29 - September 5, 2001), Presa Universitara Clujeana, p. 127-133.
- Granier B. & Brun R. (1991), Cylindroporella cruciformis et Holosporella arabica, deux Dasycladacées nouvelles du Groupe Thamama, (? Portlandien-) Berriasien-Aptien d'Abu Dhabi, Émirats Arabes Unis. Cretaceous Research, 12, p. 403-410.
- Granier B., Bucur I.I. & Trabold G. (2000), Falsolikanella danilovae Radoičić ex Barattolo 1978, n. comb., a Diploporacean alga from the Urgonian facies. Acta Palaeontologica Romaniae, 2 (1999), p. 177-181.
- Granier B. & Deloffre R. (1994), Inventaire des Algues Dasycladales fossiles. II° partie - Les Algues Dasycladales du Jurassique et du Crétacé. Revue de Paléobiologie, 12/1 (1993), p. 19-65.
- Granier B. & Deloffre R. (1995), Inventaire des Algues Dasycladales fossiles. III° partie - Les Algues Dasycladales du Permien et du Trias. Revue de Paléobiologie, 14/1 (1994), p. 49-84.
- Granier B. & Hofmann T. (2002), Un guide pour la collection de Julius PIA. 2ème partie. In: Bucur I.I. & Filipescu S. (eds.), Research advances in calcareous algae and microbial carbonates. Proceedings of the 4th IFAA Regional Meeting (Cluj-Napoca, August 29 - September 5, 2001), Presa Universitara Clujeana, p. 135-144.
- Granier B., Masse J.P. & Berthou P.Y. (1995), Heteroporella lepina Praturlon, 1967, revisited (followed by taxonomic notes on the so-called Heteroporella species). Proceedings of the International Symposium and Field-Meeting Alpine Algae '93. Beiträge zur Paläontologie, 19 (1994), p. 129-141.
- Granier B. & Michaud F. (1987), Deloffrella quercifoliipora n.gen. n.sp., une Algue Dasycladacée nouvelle du Kimméridgien et du Portlandien du Sud-Est du Mexique. Bulletin de la Société géologique de France, (8), III/6, p. 1089-1096.
- Granier B. & Michaud F. (1990)- Draconisella genotii n.gen. n.sp., Algue Dasycladacée du Portlandien du Chiapas (Sud-Est du Mexique). Revue de Paléobiologie, 8/2, p. 365-372.
- Granier B., Michaud F. & Fourcade E. (1986), Apinella jaffrezoi n.gen. n.sp., Algue Dasycladacée du Kimméridgien du Chiapas (Sud-Est du Mexique). Geobios, 19/6, p. 801-813.
- Granier B., Poisson A., Ferré B. & Deloffre R. (2003), New data on Petrascula iberica Dragastan et Trappe 1986, nov. comb., a Liassic club-shaped Dasycladacean. Preliminary note. In: Yuan X. & Mu X. (eds.), Fossil Algae and stromatolites. Acta Micropalaeontologica Sinica, 20/1, p. 67-74.
