= Carnets Geol. =

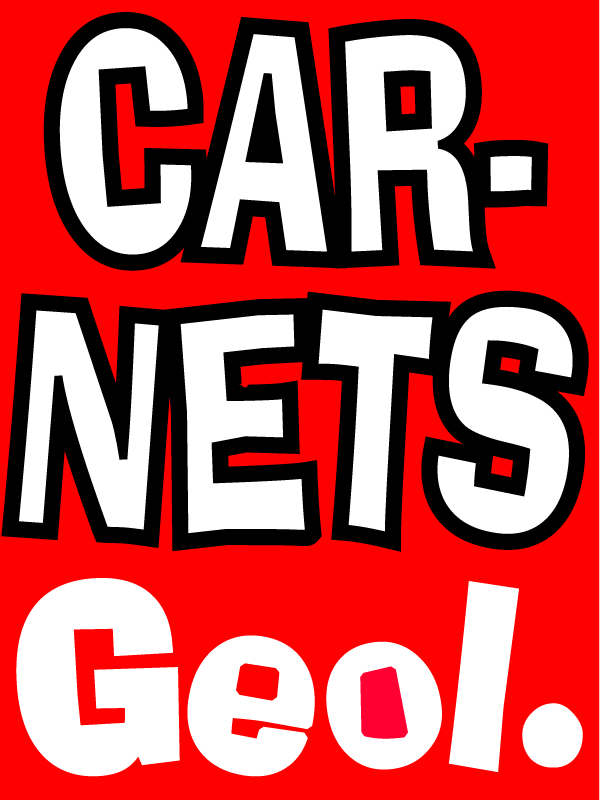
- Discipline: Paleontology, Stratigraphy, Sedimentology
- Language: English, French, Spanish
- Edited by: Bruno Granier

Publication details
- Former name: Carnets de Géologie
- History: 2002–present
- Publisher: Association Carnets de Géologie (Spain, France)
- Frequency: Irregular; Upon acceptance (online)
- Open access: Yes
- License: CC BY-NC-SA 4.0
- Impact factor: 1.175 (2018)

Standard abbreviations
- ISO 4: Carnets Geol.

Indexing
- ISSN: 1634-0744

Links
- Journal homepage

Carnets Geol. (previously Carnets de Géologie or Carnets de Géologie - Notebooks on Geology) is an electronic journal that publishes in the field of geosciences, and particularly paleontology, stratigraphy, and sedimentology. The open-access journal is one of the founding members of the OA portal GeoSciences e-Journals. Since 2007, it is published by the eponymic Association Carnets de Géologie at the University of Western Brittany in Brest, France.

== Description ==
Carnets Geol. publishes peer-reviewed contributions (memoirs, articles, and letters) on an irregular basis, that is each new paper is released online as soon as possible after the editorial office received the latest reviewed and corrected version from the author(s). These contributions are written either in English, French, or both languages, but articles in Spanish, German, or Italian will also appear. All include titles, abstracts, and keywords in both English and French. In addition to the journal issues, the association also publishes OA e-books. All the journal contents, subject to a CC BY-NC-SA 4.0 License, is freely available on the Internet from the main site hosted by the RedIRIS's servers and from institutional open archives sites. A CD version and later a DVD version were issued on an irregular basis.

== History ==
Carnets Geol. was founded in 2002 by Bruno Granier. The editorial office was first in Maintenon, France, before being moved to Brest in 2004. In 2004 and 2005, agreements were signed respectively with INIST and HAL (hyperarticles en ligne), in order to give a better visibility to the authors' scientific contributions. In 2007 (tome 4) and 2008 (tome 5), 500 sponsored copies of the CD version were issued. In 2009 (tome 6), 2010 (tome 7), 2011 (tome 8), 2012 (tome 9) and 2014 (tome 10), 1000 copies of the DVD version were issued and distributed.
