= Nilpena =

Pastoral lease in South Australia

Coordinates: 31.012°S 138.228°E

Location in South Australia

Nilpena Station is a former pastoral lease in the northern Flinders Ranges in South Australia, since August 2025 acquired by the South Australian Government to become part of the Nilpena Ediacara National Park. Originally acquired by Thomas Elder and Robert Barr Smith in 1859, the property changed hands and uses as a sheep station and then cattle station over the years, until acquired by the Fargher family in the early 1980s. In 1985, the owners discovered Ediacaran fossils on the station, leading to further research and study by scientists on the property. In 2019, two-thirds of the property was sold to the Government of South Australia, to become part of the Nilpena Ediacara National Park when proclaimed in 2021. In August 2025, the rest of the property was sold to the government, enlarging the area of the national park and ensuring that the fossils are protected. The property is part of a bid for a large area of the Flinders Ranges to become a World Heritage Site.

== History ==
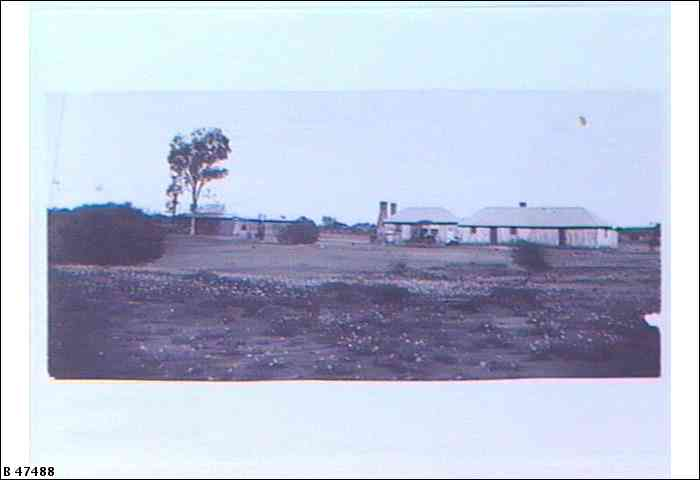
Nilpena c. 1897

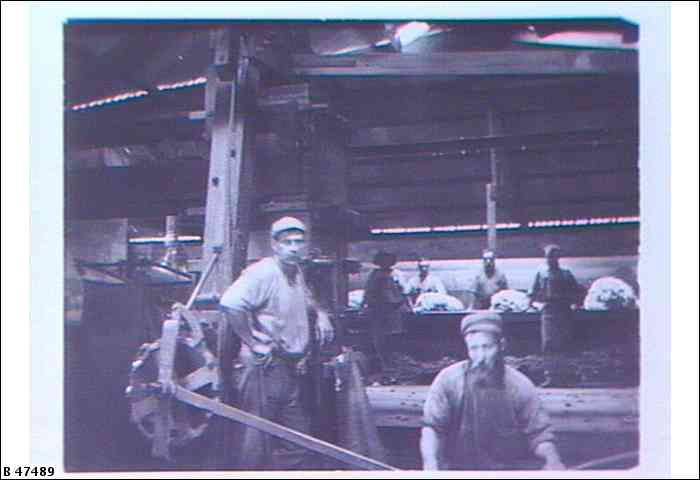
Shearing shed at Nilpena c. 1897

Thomas Elder and Robert Barr Smith acquired Nilpena in 1859.

William James Browne owned the property in 1879 when he had the drover Giles take 12,000 sheep from Nilpena and overland them all the way to his new properties Newcastle Waters and Delamere Stations. Only 8000 sheep survived the journey, but it was still regarded as one of the most remarkable droving feats in Australian history. Browne appointed Roderick John Matheson to manage the property, along with Arkaba Station. Matheson and John Lewis later bought Nilpena, with Matheson later buying out Lewis.

In 1925, the Old Nilpena Station was placed on the market for auction. At this time it occupied 31,404 acres (127.09 km^{2}) and was stocked with over 3000 merino sheep. It failed to reach the reserve price of £11,750.

Matheson still owned the property in 1926, along with neighbouring Warrioota Station, which together occupied an area of 350 square miles (906 km^{2}). He was running about 15,000 sheep across the two properties. Colin Matheson and his wife had taken over by 1931.

For some time in the 1930s through to the early 1950s, both sheep and cattle were run on the property. In 1944 the property was carrying 7000 sheep.

In January 1948, Colin Matheson of "Wilpena Station, via Quorn", was critically injured in a car accident in Adelaide. In 1950, the station was run by the Nilpena Pastoral Company, whose managing director was a Mr Toll. In that year, the station received 18 months' worth of rain over three days, some 11.6 inches (295 mm). The 216,000-acre (874 km^{2}) property had over 10,000 acres (40 km^{2}) completely under water. Toll estimated at the time that the property would have sufficient feed guaranteed for the next two years. In 1950, the property was described as located approximately 44 kilometres (27 mi) west of Blinman and 99 kilometres (62 mi) north of Hawker in the Flinders Ranges and bounded by Lake Torrens.

Some time prior to the 1980s, Nilpena was fully converted into a cattle station, and the Fargher family acquired the property in the early 1980s. Ross Fargher discovered a pristine Ediacaran fossil site in 1985 that later became the focus of ground-breaking research, and an application being made for World Heritage listing to help protect the site. American paleontologist Mary Droser of the University of California (later accompanied by her son Ian, born around 2000, now a marine biologist), along with experts from the South Australian Museum started regularly visiting Nilpena to explore and analyse the fossil beds.

In March 2019, (Note: The 2023 Dillon article says 2016, but other sources seem to concur that it was in 2019.) the Government of South Australia agreed to the purchase of two-thirds of Nilpena Station from the Fargher family, in order to enlarge the Ediacara Conservation Park and to include land on which some of the valuable fossils were found. The AU$2.2 million purchase price was met by a public-private partnership, and the sale meant that that the existing conservation park would be increased in size by more than ten times. The sale was finalised in January 2020, after global environmental protection organisation The Nature Conservancy arranged funding from an anonymous donor, which allowed for the purchase and site protection to proceed. The previously anonymous donor name was later disclosed as the Wyss Campaign for Nature, an initiative launched in 2018 by the Wyss Foundation, which was created by Hansjörg Wyss in 1998.

In 2021 the enlarged conservation park was proclaimed as the Nilpena Ediacara National Park, which opened in April 2023. Ross and Jane Fargher, who have been working for seven years with Jason Irving, head of the national parks program, acted as caretakers of the fossil beds until a ranger could be appointed. Nilpena is a significant element of the ongoing application, begun in 2016, for part of the Flinders Ranges to become a World Heritage Site.

In August 2025, the Farghers sold the rest of their property to the government, saying "We were keen to not just sell it as a pastoral lease, because the next people that bought it may not be interested in fossils".

== In media ==
In 2010, the fossils and the property featured on the David Attenborough TV series First Life.

== See also ==
- List of ranches and stations
