= Dubiofossil =

Geological structure that looks like a fossil but whose origin is not established

The term dubiofossil is a portmanteau word used in geology and paleontology for a problematic structure that looks like a fossil but has an uncertain biologic origin. From Latin dubius, and English fossil, the word has been used mainly for remains found in rocks dating from the early history of the Earth (Precambrian rocks), but it is also applicable in other settings such as problematic microbe-like forms in meteorites.

Although ultimately such structures are either biogenic (i.e., fossil) or abiogenic (i.e., pseudofossil), the information available at the time of study is insufficient to make an unambiguous determination. They belong to the dubiofossil category temporarily, awaiting additional evidence that will allow them to be removed from this category and attributed to the fossils or the pseudofossils. For example, see ALH84001.

Physical and chemical processes can produce structures that look indistinguishable from some that are formed by biologic activity, presenting a hurdle in their interpretation.

Living systems are capable of metabolism, reproduction, mutation, and propagation of the mutations. Lines of evidence for biogenicity, called biosignatures, come in various forms and appear at various scales, ranging from the atomic to the planetary dimension.

Molecule-building, cell division, colony formation, respiration, excretion, active motility are amongst the biologic processes that affect changes in the environment and can leave distinctive morphologic features or signature chemical by-products in the geologic record.

These attributes are susceptible to be modified or obliterated over geologic time, making it more difficult to recognize them in the rocks. The case for biogenicity is most robust when multiple lines of evidence converge.
