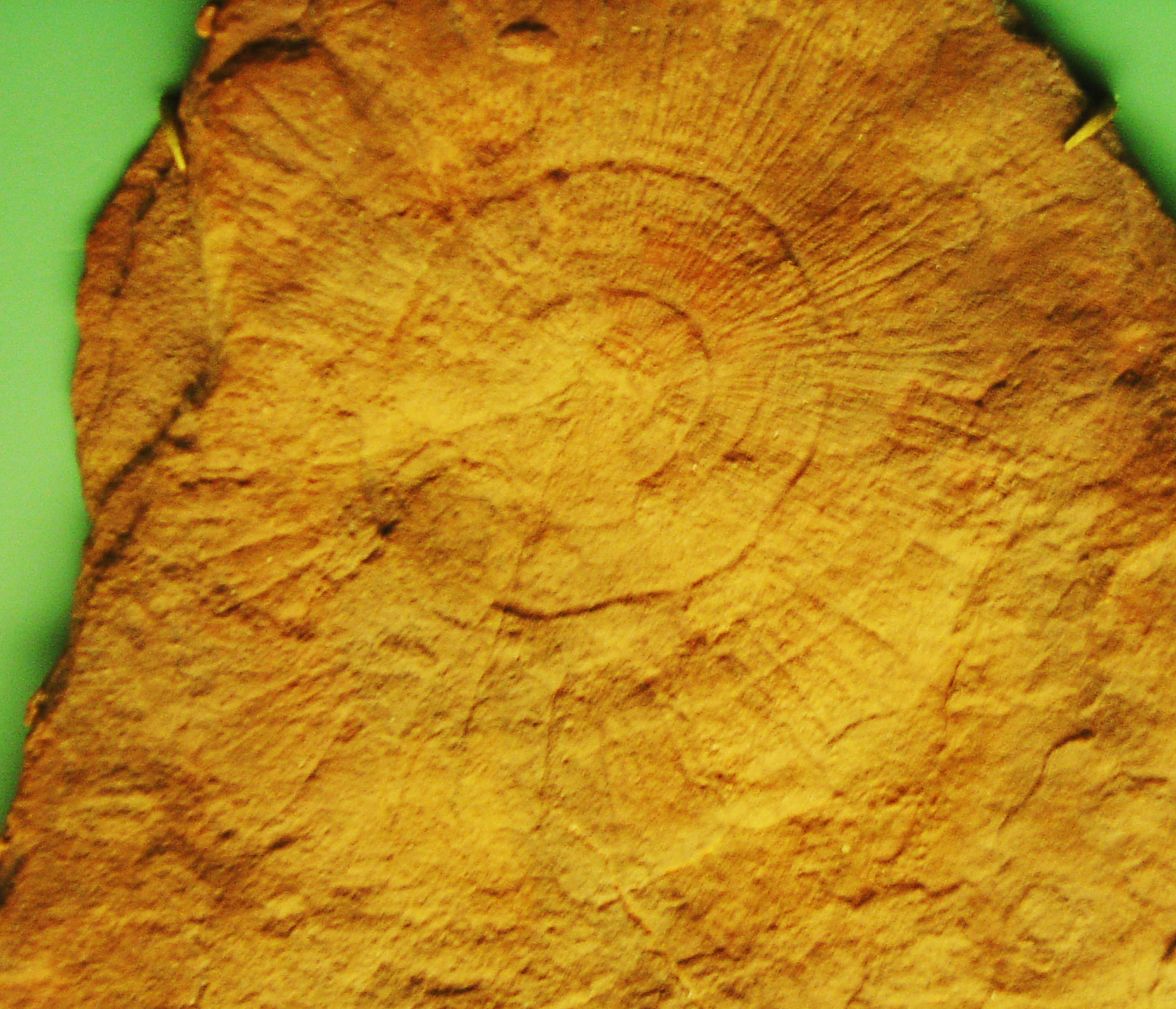
- Medusinites asteroides from the Ediacaran Ediacara Member of the Rawnsley Quartzite in the Ediacara Hills, South Australia on display at the US. National Museum, Washington

Scientific classification
- Kingdom: Animalia
- Phylum: Cnidaria
- Class: Cyclozoa
- Genus: Medusinites Glaessner & Wade, 1966

Type species
- Medusina asteroides Sprigg, 1949

Species
- M. applanatus; M. asteroides (Sprigg, 1949); M. paliji

= Medusinites =

Medusinites Temporal range: 580–541 Ma

Extinct genus of cnidarians

Medusinites is a genus of disc shaped fossilised organisms associated with the Ediacaran biota. They have been found in rocks dated to be 580 to 541 million years old.

== Biology ==
Only three distinct species of Medusinites are known. They are similar to Protolyella in form and have an inner and outer ring. Specimens are typically 1–5 cm in diameter and the radius of its central disc is smaller than the width of the outer ring. They also have radial furrows and concentric circle features, but those details are not always preserved. They have been described as possibly living a lifestyle similar to a "stationary intermediate-level epifaunal osmotroph".

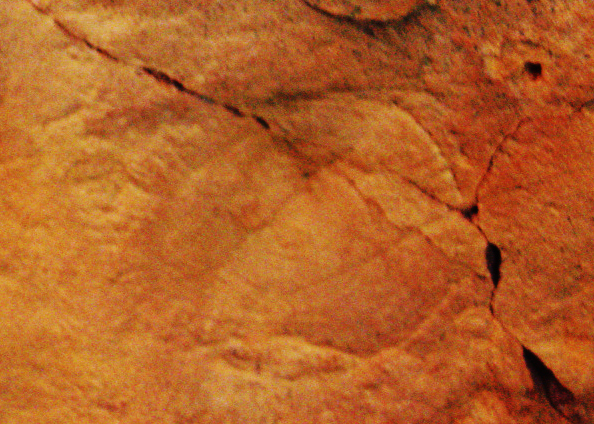
Medusinites asteroides from the Ediacaran Ediacara Member of the Rawnsley Quartzite in the Ediacara Hills, South Australia on display at the Western Australian Museum, Perth.

== Distribution ==
Medusinites species have been found in Australia, Canada, Norway, India, Algeria and Brazil. They are often found in sandstone and quartzite.

== Classification ==
Medusinites are in the Phylum Cnidaria, which means they are related to other genera such as Aspidella and Cloudinidae, and are essentially classified as eumetazoans, just like modern jellyfish. However, there have been several differing theories over the years about the placement of Medusinites, as well as the Ediacaran biota as a whole, and how many species there are within the genus. Several species within Medusinites have been moved to other genera or absorbed into other existing species, such as M. patellaris, which was found to be a junior holotype for an Aspidella sp., and M. mawsoni, which was assimilated into M. asteroides. Regarding the debate over the nature of disc shaped Ediacaran fossils like Medusinites, there are two main opposing points of view. A. Seilacher views the theory of them being soft bodied and jellyfish-like as problematic and suggests that they were more likely a unique type of organism that had a "quilted" construction. Another view supported by Grazhdankin and Gerdes is that they were possibly a type of microbial colony.
