= Costean =

Mining process

Costeaning is the process by which miners seek to discover metallic lodes. It consists in sinking small pits through the superficial deposits to the solid rock, and then driving from one pit to another across the direction of the vein, in such manner as to cross all the veins between the two pits.

In the Northern Territory of Australia, costeans are required to be excavated in a way which reduces disturbance to the environment.
