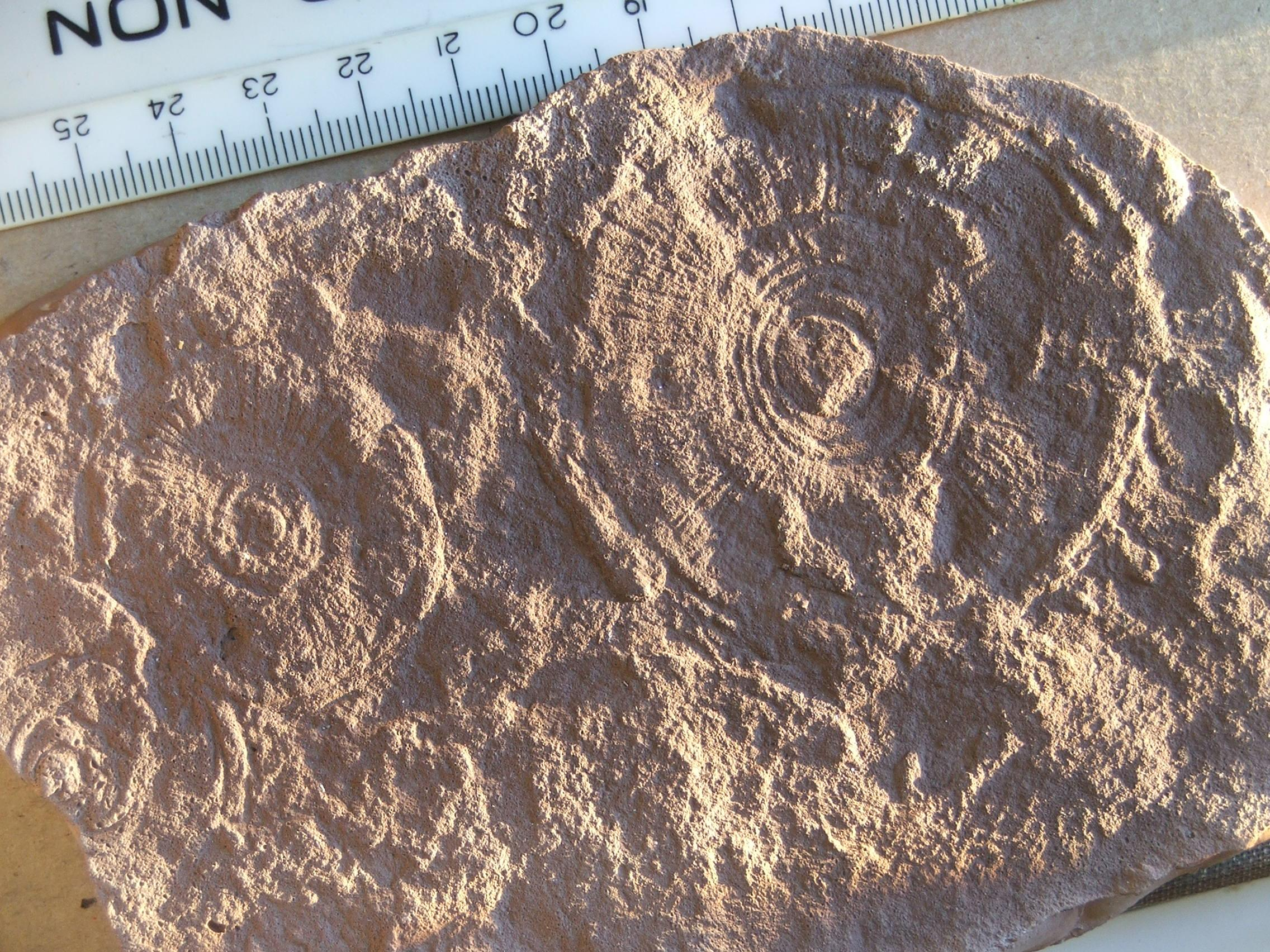
- Two large and small specimens of Cyclomedusa

Scientific classification
- Kingdom: Animalia (?)
- Genus: †Cyclomedusa; Sprigg, 1947
- Species: †C. davidii

Binomial name
- †Cyclomedusa davidii Sprigg, 1947

= Cyclomedusa =

Cyclomedusa Temporal range: Ediacaran (Potential Orosirian records)

Extinct genus of aquatic animals

Cyclomedusa is a circular fossil of the Ediacaran biota; it has a circular bump in the middle and as many as five circular growth ridges around it. Many specimens are small, but specimens in excess of 20 cm are known. The concentric disks are not necessarily circular, especially when adjacent individuals interfere with each other's growth. Many radial segment lines — somewhat pineapple-like — extend across the outer disks. A few specimens show what might be a stem extending from the center in some direction or other.

Cyclomedusa is widely distributed in Ediacaran strata. There have also been occasional reports of Cyclomedusa from older rocks, with some dating back as far as the Orosirian some 2.0 to 1.8 Ga, although due to the great age of these fossils, they remain controversial in nature, with some researchers suggesting them to be microbial colonies, or dubiofossils. Cyclomedusa was originally thought to be a jellyfish but some specimens seem to be distorted to accommodate adjacent specimens on the substrate, apparently indicating a benthic (bottom-dwelling) creature. The markings do not match the musculature pattern of modern jellyfish. The fossils have been conjectured to represent a holdfast for some stalked form — possibly an octacorallian, or something else entirely. Alternatively, it was thought that the described species actually represent different modes of preservation for one organism or that several different organisms have been grouped together under one name as a form taxon.

It is now suggested that Cyclomedusa was a microbial colony; D. Grazhdankin reinterprets the concentric rings and radial structures as comparable to those seen in modern-day microbial colonies exposed to homogeneously distributed environmental conditions.

Cyclomedusa is known from Neoproterozoic beds in Ediacara (Australia), Finnmark (Norway), Charnwood Forest (England), Olenek (Russia), North China, Newfoundland, Northwest Canada, Podolia (Ukraine), the Ural Mountains (Russia), the White Sea (Russia), Sonora (Mexico), and Mato Grosso (Brazil). It is regarded as a member of the Ediacaran biota— a group of somewhat obscure organisms that thrived just before most of the modern multicellular animal phyla appeared. Cyclomedusa has no known relatives.

== See also ==
- List of Ediacaran genera
