= Ediacara Hills =

Low hills in South Australia

Coordinates: 30°49′S 138°8′E

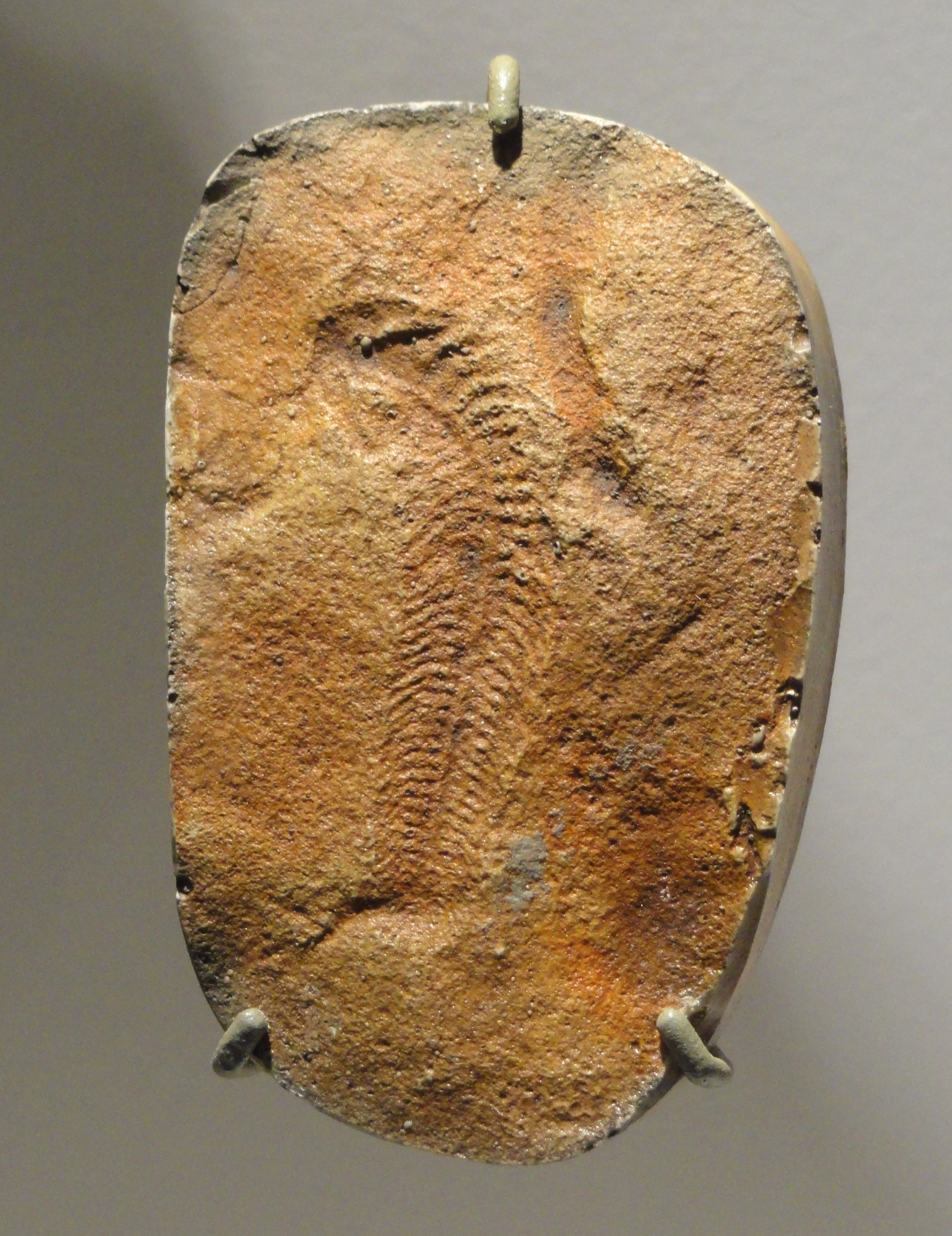
Fossil Spriggina; one of the many fossils found at the Ediacara Hills

Ediacara Hills (/ˌiːdiˈækərə/ EE-dee-AK-ər-ə), also known as Ediacaran Hills, are a range of low hills in the northern part of the Flinders Ranges of South Australia, around 650 kilometres (400 mi) north of the state capital of Adelaide. They are within the Nilpena Ediacara National Park.

The hills are known for being the location where the significant trace fossils of the Ediacaran biota were discovered. These fossil beds contain some of the oldest known multicellular lifeforms, the importance of which has led to the naming of the Ediacaran geological period.

== Etymology ==
The name "Ediacara" has a disputed origin from one of the Aboriginal languages near the Flinders Range area. It is first known to have been used during the middle of the 19th century. Earlier Australian sources suggested that the "name 'Ediacara' or 'Idiyakra' may be derived from an Indigenous term associating it with a place near water". (Note: The name 'Idiyakra', or 'Ediacara', is Australian Aboriginal in origin and can be traced back to 1859 or a little earlier, when the first White pastoralists took up lands in the far north western Flinders Ranges. Its etymology links it to a place where water is or was present close by or about, either in the sense of the present or extending distantly into past wetter times. As water is synonymous with life in the harsh, arid lands of Australia, it is a fitting name for a time when the first megascopic marine animals evolved. As the records of early surveyors and State Parliamentary records show, the ending of the name sounded as a 'kra', 'ker', or 'ka', and hence the appropriate name of the Period is 'Ediacaran'. — R.J.F. Jenkins (unpublished note, 2003))

Another theory suggests that the term may be a mispronunciation of the two words "Yata Takarra", meaning hard or stony ground ("in reference to the flat Ediacara plateau of dolomite that forms the centre of the Ediacara syncline"). Supporting this latter contention, it has been argued that the word "has nothing in it that corresponds to any word for water in any of the local languages" and that local tradition "has it that the name meant 'granite plain', but, since there appears to be no igneous rock in the area, this could well refer to the hardness of the ground, rather than to its geological composition". Adnyamathanha woman Beverley Patterson, who had heard stories since childhood about the fossils, said shortly before the opening of the national park in April 2023 that Ediacara was the Adnyamathanha word for the zebra finch, a bird endemic to the area.

However, there are a number of complications in trying to establish the origins of place names supposedly relating to Aboriginal words, and there is no definitive answer for Ediacara.

== Paleontological and geological significance ==
The hills are located within the locality of Ediacara, named primarily after the range itself, and within the Nilpena Ediacara National Park. They are also sometimes referred to as the Ediacaran Hills. The hills also contain fossils of early multicellular life forms, the Ediacara biota (lagerstätte), and have given their name to the Ediacaran.

=== Australian heritage listing ===
There are two separate fossil sites within the region which have heritage protection under Australian legislation: The Ediacara Fossil Site – Nilpena is listed on the Australian National Heritage List (added 11 January 2007), while the Ediacara Fossil Reserve Palaeontological Site, located 20 kilometres (12 mi) to its north, is listed on the South Australian Heritage Register (added 4 March 1993).

=== World Heritage Site application ===
The Nilpena Ediacara National Park is one of a group of seven geographically separate areas that are part of the Flinders Ranges geological successions where abundant and diverse arrays of fossils show how animal life began on Earth over a period of 350 million years. These areas were submitted to the UNESCO World Heritage Centre for consideration as a World Heritage Site under criterion (viii) on 15 April 2021, and as of August 2025 remain on the "tentative" list. The nomination will be voted on in 2026.

== Mining ==
The area has many old copper and silver mines from mining activity during the late 19th century. Mining was first reported there in 1888, with an area becoming known as the Ediacara Mines after more costeans were dug.

Further attempts to mine the area were carried out in 1967 by C.R.A. Exploration, which used diamond drilling to explore the ground, but this was abandoned after they proved fruitless.

As of 2012, the area was still able to be accessed for "licensed mineral exploration or mining activities".

== See also ==
- List of fossil sites (with link directory)
