= Reg Sprigg =

Australian geologist

Reg Sprigg AO FTSE
- Born: Reginald Claude Sprigg; 1 March 1919; Yorketown, South Australia
- Died: 2 December 1994 (aged 75); Glasgow, Scotland
- Resting place: Arkaroola, South Australia (ashes scattered)
- Education: Adelaide Technical High School, University of Adelaide (BSc, MSc 1942)
- Occupations: geologist, conservationist
- Years active: 1942-1994
- Known for: discovery of Pre-Cambrian fossils at Ediacara Hills, South Australia; initiator, Arkaroola Wilderness Sanctuary, Flinders Ranges, South Australia
- Spouse(s): Patricia Day (divorced) and Griselda A. Findlay Paterson
- Awards: Royal Society of South Australia Verco Medal (1968), HonDSc ANU (1980), HonDSc Flinders (1990)

Reginald Claude Sprigg (1 March 1919 – 2 December 1994) was an Australian geologist and conservationist. At 17, sponsored by Walter Howchin, he became the youngest Fellow of the Royal Society of South Australia. During 1946, in the Ediacara Hills, South Australia he discovered the Ediacara biota, an assemblage of some of the most ancient animal fossils known. He was involved with oceanographic research and petroleum exploration by various companies that he initiated. In 1968, he acquired a derelict pastoral lease, Arkaroola, and transformed it into a wildlife sanctuary and wilderness reserve.

== Early life and education ==
Reginald Claude Sprigg was born 1 March 1919 on South Australia's Yorke Peninsula, where his family were living in the small town of Stansbury. His parents were Claude Augustus Sprigg and Pearl Alice Irene (née Germein), who married on 17 September 1913 in Stansbury. Reg was their third and youngest child, a brother to D'Arcy Kingsley and Constance Vera.

His father's family were pastoralists, whilst the Germein family were mariners. The Sprigg family relocated to the Yorke Peninsula after being "forced off their pastoral lease at Oulnina because of drought". The Germein family were ship chandlers in Mutton Cove, Devonport, Plymouth, England: three brothers came to Australia. One, Ben Germein is remembered as a hero of the Admella rescue mission.

Before he was five years old, the family relocated to the Adelaide suburb of Goodwood, and Reg started collecting shells and fossils from local beaches. This boyhood hobby developed into a serious interest in geology, which brought him into contact with the geoscientists at the University of Adelaide, to whom he took collected samples for identification.

In addition to pursuing his studies in geology, Reg developed drawing skills, which gained him credit in the South Australian School of Arts and Crafts merit lists for 1934 and 1935.

He matriculated from the Adelaide Technical High School in 1938.

At the University of Adelaide, he was a pupil of Douglas Mawson, who said that Sprigg was "his best-ever student". Sprigg completed the requirements for his Bachelor of Science and then graduated Master of Science in 1942, receiving the science faculty's highest award, the Tate Medal. His PhD thesis was rejected for being "too messy", lacking originality, and for his refusal to tidy it up.

== Career ==
In 1940 he enlisted in the Royal Australian Engineers, and worked with munitions from 1941 to 1942. He transferred to the soils division of the CSIRO until 1943, when he joined the South Australian Geological Survey, which sent him to reopen the Radium Hill uranium field in 1944, and to map the Mount Painter uranium field, new sources being required for the Manhattan Project.

Sprigg was sent by the South Australian Government in 1946 to inspect abandoned mines in the Ediacara Hills, to ascertain whether old mines could be reworked profitably using new technologies. When he discovered the fossils, apparently while eating his lunch, he realised that they were very ancient, either of Early Cambrian, or possibly even of Precambrian age. He thought that the organisms had probably been jellyfishes. He submitted a paper to the journal Nature, but it was rejected. He travelled to London and presented his findings to the 1948 International Geological Congress, but failed to excite either interest or belief. Subsequent work by Prof Martin Glaessner at the University of Adelaide demonstrated that they were indeed of latest Precambrian age. Although Precambrian animal fossils had been reported before, they had not been accepted universally as organic. This discovery resulted ultimately in the definition in 2004 of the Ediacaran period, the first new geological period created in more than one hundred years.

Of other significance, Sprigg helped establish Santos (an acronym for South Australia Northern Territory Oil Search), which discovered gas deposits in the Cooper Basin, including the Moomba Gas Field, which supplies natural gas to South Australia, New South Wales and Canberra. In 1954 Sprigg formed the company Geosurveys of Australia, which was a consulting and contracting company for geological and geophysical work. They prospected for uranium in the Northern Territory and nickel in the north west corner area of South Australia as well as working for Santos.

In 1962 Geosurveys became incorporated into Beach Petroleum, of which Sprigg was general manager.

In 1968, Sprigg purchased the pastoral lease of Arkaroola, a property and important uranium exploration field of 610 km^{2} (240 sq mi) in the Flinders Ranges of South Australia, and converted it into a wildlife refuge and tourist attraction. A governing board of Reg Sprigg, his wife Griselda and Dennis Walter, a mineralogist and old friend, oversaw the creation of Arkaroola Village out of existing buildings and the opening to tourists in October 1968.

== Australian Energy Producers ==
Sprigg served as the founding chair of the Australian Energy Producers (AEP), which was originally established as the Australian Petroleum Exploration Association (APEA) and rebranded as the Australian Petroleum Production and Exploration Association (APPEA) in 1996, before adopting its current name in 2023.

Sprigg acknowledged the potential harm of burning fossil fuels as early as 1969, warning in the Australian Fisheries journal about changes to the atmosphere's chemical composition. These views contrast sharply with APEA's later actions, as it worked with the Australian Institute of Petroleum to emphasise uncertainties in climate science.

== ASIO ==
Sprigg attracted the attention of the Australian Security Intelligence Organisation (ASIO) in 1950, due to his knowledge of uranium deposits in Australia and throughout the world. In 1943 Sprigg had been secretary of the Australian Association of Scientific Workers. The association was concerned with the transfer of scientific workers from wartime to peacetime projects once hostilities ceased, and encouraged debate on the social responsibility of science. ASIO suspected the organisation of Communist ties, and as a result Sprigg was surveilled for some ten years.

== Personal life ==
In 1942, Sprigg married Patricia Day, who had been born in Wiltshire, England and relocated to Adelaide with her parents in 1927. In 1943, she graduated as a BA (Adelaide), scoring first place in Political Science and worked in the History School during 1945 and 1946 reading essays and lecturing. In 1948, Patricia, aged 25, left Adelaide on the P&O ship SS Stratheden, arriving in London on 27 March 1948. In London she worked at Magazine of the Future whilst reading law at Lincoln's Inn. Reg and Patricia divorced in 1950 and she moved to Sweden in 1951 to marry Gillis Een.

On 3 February 1951, Sprigg married Griselda A. Findlay Paterson, daughter of Robert Findlay Paterson and Grace (née Dreghorn), born December 1921 in Paisley, Scotland. Griselda had studied in Glasgow and qualified as a radiographer.

During 1948, Reg, still with the South Australian Mines Department, was in Britain in association with uranium on behalf of the government; Griselda has said that she met Reg "on ...the island of Arran, .... Well there was I with three nursing sisters I'd held up with, and as I walked out of the restaurant that night, they stopped me and said, 'I bet you can't get a date with the Australian before midnight tonight, for tomorrow. I said 'How much is it worth', they said 'five quid', and I said 'that'll do me'. I got the five quid, got the date, and I always say, I won him in a bet".

In 1952, a daughter, Margaret and in 1954, a son, Douglas were born in South Australia.

Griselda and the children often accompanied Reg in his outback travels. In 1962 the entire family completed the first vehicular crossing of the Simpson Desert. In 2001, Griselda published an account of those travels in Dune is a four-letter word.

Reg Sprigg died on 2 December 1994 whilst on holiday in Glasgow, Scotland. His ashes were scattered at Arkaroola.

Griselda Sprigg died 20 March 2003.

== Bibliography ==
Reg Sprigg is the author or coauthor of these books:

- Uranium Deposits in South Australia with Dickinson, Samuel Benson, D. King, M. L. Wade, B. P. Webb, A. W. G. Whittle, F. L. Stillwell, and A. B. Edwards, Australia (South) Geol. Survey Bull., 1954.
- Arkaroola – Mt Painter in the Flinders Ranges with Griselda Sprigg, 1976.
- Arkaroola – Mt Painter in the Flinders Ranges: The Last Billion Years, 1984 and 1988. ISBN 0-959-0966-0-4.
- Geology is Fun (Recollections) or The anatomy and confessions of a geological addict, 1989 ISBN 0-959-0966-1-2.
- A Geologist Strikes Out, Recollections by Reg Sprigg, December 1993, ISBN 0-646-16410-4.

== Recognition ==
=== Honours and awards ===
- In 1980, he was awarded an honorary doctorate of science by the Australian National University.
- In 1982, he was the inaugural Lewis G. Weeks Medallist, awarded by the then Australian Petroleum Exploration Association.
- In 1983, he was made an Officer of the Order of Australia.
- In 1986, he was the recipient of the Royal Society of South Australia's Verco Medal; at age 17, he had been the youngest fellow of the society.
- In 1990, Flinders University conferred on him the honorary degree of Doctor of Science.

=== Naming ===
- In 1958, the genus Spriggina was named in his honour.
- In 1995 Australian Energy Producers renamed its gold medal (established in 1989 as the APEA Gold Medal) for "highly valued contributions within or for the Australian oil and gas industry or through sustained, notable leadership within APPEA" as the Reg Sprigg Gold Medal in his honour.
- In 1998, the Geological Society of Australia, South Australia Branch initiated the biennial Sprigg Symposium "in recognition of the contributions Dr Reginald Sprigg made towards many aspects of geology in South Australia".
- In 2001, the University of Adelaide announced that it had established the Reg Sprigg Chair in Petroleum Engineering in the (now) Australian School of Petroleum and Energy Resources.
- In 2004, the mineral Spriggite, a uranyl hydroxide mineral, was named in his honour.
- The Spriggina floundersi sculpture at the University of Adelaide, by Silvio Apponyi, was created in honour of Sprigg.
- The annual Sprigg Lecture Series is held by the South Australian Museum to commemorate his discovery of the Ediacara fauna.
- The main-belt asteroid 5380 Sprigg, discovered by Robert McNaught at the Siding Spring Observatory in 1991, was named in his honour.
- Sprigg Canyon, a submarine canyon on the Australian continental margin south of Kangaroo Island, one of the Murray group of canyons discovered by Sprigg in 1947.
- Sprigg Orogeny - neotectonic (contemporary) episode of mountain building along the axes of the Flinders and Mount Lofty Ranges in South Australia.

== See also ==
- List of fossil sites (with link directory)
