= Mistaken Point Formation =

Geologic formation in Newfoundland and Labrador, Canada

- Stratigraphic range: Ediacaran 565 Ma
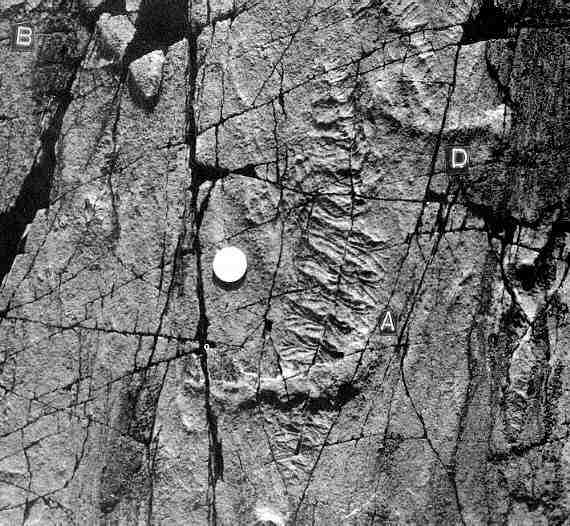
- Type: Formation
- Unit of: Conception Group
- Sub-units: Murphy's Cove and Goodland Point Members
- Underlies: Trepassey Formation
- Overlies: Drook Formation; Briscal Formation

Lithology
- Primary: Tuffaceous siltstone
- Other: Sandstone, Shale

Location
- Region: Newfoundland
- Country: Canada
- Outcrop occurrence of the Mistaken Point formation in southeast Newfoundland

The Mistaken Point Formation is a geologic formation in Newfoundland and Labrador. It is recognized as a Lagerstätte preserving fossils dating back to the Ediacaran period. It contains a stratum dated to 565 ± 3 million years ago.

== Geology ==
Mistaken Point Formation includes many fine ash-beds, which are a good source of zircons used in the uranium-lead method of radiometric dating, allowing the site to be confidently dated to approximately 565 million years old.

These fine-grained volcanic ash beds also preserve finely detailed fossils.

== Fossils ==
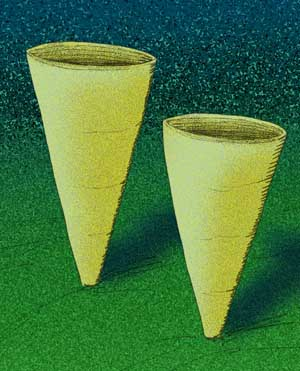
cone shaped organism Thectardis

Mistaken Point contains some of the oldest ediacaran biota in an Avalon-type assemblage. They are commonly categorized as Spindle-shaped (Fractofusus), Frond-shaped (Charniodiscus), or Bush-like / Radiating (Bradgatia) in form. Spindles are the most common fossils in the assemblage. Other forms do exist, such as the conical Thectardis.

Some of the forms here appear to survive until the extinction of the Ediacaran biota at the base of the Cambrian. The evolutionary history of these forms is unknown, though hypotheses exist.

comb shaped organism Pectinifrons

== Discovery of Ediacaran fossils in the Avalon Peninsula ==
In the summer of 1967, Shiva Balak Misra, an Indian graduate student (1966–69) at Newfoundland's Memorial University discovered a rich assemblage of imprints of soft bodied organisms on the surface of large rock slabs, while mapping the Conception Group of Avalon Peninsula of Newfoundland near Cape Race, at a place called Mistaken Point.

These unusual impressions of previously unknown soft-bodied sea animals on the surfaces of argillites (mudstone) included coelenterates and other metazoa of the Ediacarian period, 575 to 560 million years ago. These fossils are records of the oldest known complex life forms that existed anywhere on Earth. Misra was the first to prepare and present a systematic geological map of the region, to classify and describe the rock sequence of the area and to work out the depositional history of the rocks.

The description of the fossil assemblage together with their mode of occurrence, the cause of sudden death, ecological conditions and chronological position form part of Misra's detailed thesis submitted for the degree of Master of Science. The discovery was reported in a 1968 letter to Nature. Misra described the Mistaken Point fauna in detail in 1969, in a paper published in the Bulletin of the Geological Society of America. He sorted the fossil assemblage into five groups, namely spindle-shaped, leaf-shaped, round lobate, dendrite like, and radiating. Each group was defined in terms of distribution and form, sub-categories and biological affinity.

The geological environment of the fossil-bearing rocks and the ecology of the animals that lived and died in the Conception Sea were described by Misra in two of his subsequent papers published in the Bulletin of the Geological Society of America in 1971 and in the Journal of the Geological Society of India in 1981. Mistaken Point Ecological Reserve is a 5.7-square kilometer area of the coast that protects the fossils.

The sudden appearance of Ediacaran soft bodied organisms in the Mistaken Point assemblage has been called the 'Ediacaran Explosion' or 'Avalon Explosion'

== Paleobiota ==
Like the other overlying and underlying formations, the Mistaken Point Formation represents a rare deep-marine paleoenviroment, which was home to various sessile forms, most predominantly, the petalonamids like Fractofusus and Frondophyllas.

Color key: Taxon / Reclassified taxon / Taxon falsely reported as present / Dubious taxon or junior synonym / Ichnotaxon / Ootaxon / Morphotaxon

Notes
Uncertain or tentative taxa are in small text
~~crossed out~~ taxa are discredited.

=== Petalonamae ===
Genus	Species	Notes	Images
Arborea	A. arborea	Sessile frondose organism.	
Arborea	A. elegans	Sessile frondose organism.	
Beothukis	B. mistakensis	Sessile frondose organism.	
Bradgatia	B. linfordensis	Sessile frondose organism.	
Broccoliforma	B. alta	Sessile frondose organism.	
Charnia	C. masoni	Sessile frondose organism.	
Charniodiscus	C. procerus	Sessile frondose organism.	
Frondophyllas	F. grandis	Sessile tree-like frondose organism.	
Fractofusus	F. andersoni; F. misrai	Sessile spindle-like frondose organism.	
Gigarimaneta	G. samsoni	Sessile frondose organism.	
Hapsidophyllas	H. flexibilis	Sessile frondose organism.	
Pectinifrons	P. abyssalis	Sessile frondose organism.	
Plumeropriscum	P. hofmanni	Sessile frondose organism.	
Primocandelabrum	P. hiemaloranum; Primocandelabrum sp.	Sessile frondose organism.	
Trepassia	T. wardae	Sessile frondose organism.	
Vinlandia	V. antecedens	Sessile frondose organism.	

=== incertae sedis ===
Genus	Species	Notes	Images
Aspidella	A. terranovica	Enigmatic discoidal fossil.	
Parviscopa	P. bonavistensis	Frondose organism.	
Hadryniscala	H. avalonica	Ladder-like organism.	
Hadrynichorde	H. catalinensis	Sea Whip-like frondose organism.	
Hiemalora	Hiemalora sp.	Discoid organism, possibly holdfasts of petalonamids.	
Thectardis	T. avalonensis	Sessile cone-like organism.	

=== Ivesheadiomorphs ===
Genus	Species	Notes	Images
Ivesheadia	Ivesheadia sp.	Poorly preserved organism.	

== See also ==
- List of fossiliferous stratigraphic units in Newfoundland and Labrador
- Lagerstätte
