= Briscal Formation =

Geologic formation in Newfoundland and Labrador, Canada

- Stratigraphic range: Ediacaran 574–570 Ma (approx)
- Type: Formation
- Unit of: Conception Group
- Underlies: Mistaken Point Formation; Drook Formation
- Overlies: Gaskiers Formation
- Thickness: 310 m - 1200 m(1,017 ft - 3,937 ft)

Lithology
- Primary: Sandstone
- Other: Argillite, Siltstone, Shale

Location
- Region: Newfoundland and Labrador
- Country: Canada
- Outcrop occurrence

The Briscal Formation is a geologic formation in Newfoundland and Labrador. It preserves fossils dating back to the Ediacaran period.

== Paleobiota ==
Like the other overlying and underlying formations, the Briscal Formation represents a rare deep-marine paleoenviroment, and preserves a few fossils, like the large Frondophyllas, only known from incomplete material, some of which sits at over a meter in length.

Color key
| Taxon | Reclassified taxon | Taxon falsely reported as present | Dubious taxon or junior synonym | Ichnotaxon | Ootaxon | Morphotaxon |

Notes
Uncertain or tentative taxa are in small text; ~~crossed out~~ taxa are discredited.

=== Petalonamae ===
| Genus | Species | Notes | Images |
|---|---|---|---|
| Charniodiscus | Charniodiscus sp. | Sessile frondose organism. | |
| Culmofrons | C. plumosa | Sessile frondose organism, junior synonym of Beothukis. | |
| Beothukis | B. plumosa | Sessile frondose organism. | |
| Fractofusus | Fractofusus sp. | Sessile spindle-like frondose organism. | |
| Frondophyllas | F. grandis | Sessile tree-like frondose organism. | |
| Primocandelabrum | Primocandelabrum sp. | Sessile frondose organism. | |
| Trepassia | Trepassia sp. | Sessile frondose organism. | |

== See also ==
- List of fossiliferous stratigraphic units in Newfoundland and Labrador
