= Gigarimaneta =

Gigarimaneta Temporal range: Ediacaran, 565 Ma
- Artist's interpretation of Gigarimaneta samsoni by Robert Nicholls. A: Top view of G. samsoni. B: Side view.

Scientific classification
- Kingdom: Animalia
- Phylum: †Petalonamae
- Genus: †Gigarimaneta; Taylor et al, 2021
- Species: †G. samsoni

Binomial name
- †Gigarimaneta samsoni Taylor et al, 2021

Extinct genus of animal

Gigarimaneta samsoni is a species of epifaunal petalonamid from the Ediacaran deposits of the Canadian Mistaken Point Formation. G. samsoni grew in a similar manner to Fractofusus and/or Beothukis and grew slightly into the substrate.

Gigarimaneta was roughly round and composed of multiple rows of allantoid-like units that further sub-divided into smaller spherocylindrical units but they do not show the signature fractal branching of related fronds, however the many divisions in the units of the organism are thought to represent invaginations of a presumed lower epithelium that increased the surface-area - volume ratio without branching glide symmetry. These divisions from the units probably allowed the taxon to gain a great number of nutrients from the substrate underneath it by culturing the sulfur-oxidizing bacteria; a way of life similar to chemosynthetic phagotrophy.

== See also ==
- List of Ediacaran genera
- Hapsidophyllas
