= Colinetia =

Colinetia Temporal range: late Ediacaran ~580 Ma

Scientific classification
- Domain: incertae sedis
- Genus: †Colinetia; Fitzgerald et al., 2026
- Species: †C. daltonensis

Binomial name
- †Colinetia daltonensis Fitzgerald et al., 2026

Extinct tubular organism from the Ediacaran

Colinetia is an extinct genus from the late Ediacaran of Newfoundland and Labrador. It is discoidal in appearance with a slender tube attached, and it is a monotypic genus, containing only Colinetia daltonensis. It is also currently the oldest, large macroscopic Ediacaran fossil known, predating the Drook Formation fossils by some 8 –10 Ma.

== Discovery and naming ==
The holotype, and corresponding paratypes and fossils of Colinetia were found on the Great Colinet Island in "Site 2" of the Mall Bay Formation, Conception Group in Newfoundland, Canada in 2019 and between 2021–2025, and were formally described and named in 2026 after researchers looked to see if the fossils where either inorganic or organic in nature, and their notable complexity saw the organic origin interpretation upheld. Although it has been noted that some of the simpler disc-like structures may still be inorganic in origin, with most predominately being the remains of sediment volcanos.

The generic name Colinetia derives from the place name "Great Colinet Island", from where the type species was recovered from. The specific name daltonensis derives from the place name "Dalton Point", which is the closest named geographical location to the fossil site, and is also in honour of Michael Dalton, who not only helped researchers reach the island by boat, but whose ancestors also gave the location its name.

== Description ==
Colinetia daltonensis is a discoidal organism with a notably slender, flexible tube set on top. The discoidal holdfast structure is smooth in appearance with a deep slope to the outer margin from the center, and can get up to 50 mm (2 in) in diameter. The cylindrical tube that is attached to the holdfast structure is smooth in overall appearance, save for wrinkles in the wall, suggesting it was flexible in life. The tube notably bears a sharp outer margin, and preserves in both full-relief and hypo-relief, with some better preserved specimens containing a secondary inner tube running longitudinally up the main tube, and ranges from 15.5 cm (6 in) to 2 m (6 ft 7 in) in length.

There is also a single specimen of Colinetia known with a flared distal termination on the tube, which has been compared to the occasional Aulozoon specimens with a similar feature, although due to the poor preservation and lack of other specimens with a similar structure, there is difficulty in inferring whether this would be a shared feature.

== Taphonomy ==
Colinetia is noted to have been preserved completely differently from the standard Conception- and Fermeuse-style preservations commonly seen in Newfoundland. Several specimens are noted to have an infill mould, inferring that part of the organism was parallel with the seafloor. These tubular moulds are elliptical in cross-section, implying the organism did not collapse before or during infilling. Only ~10 cm (4 in) below the fossil beds of Colinetia at "Site 2" are several layers of rip-down mudstone-clasts, and sandy siltstone conduits, with sediment volcanos above formed from fluidized sediments coming from these lower layers. It is noted that a sediment volcano could have appeared beneath the holdfast of Colinetia, and thus infilling it from the bottom-up. Further supporting this is the infill containing small, sparse mudstone-clasts in specimens with clay lining, whilst specimens without contain abundant mudstone-clasts, which most likely would have entered either via a sediment volcano, or a distal rupture in the tube.

The apparent elliptical rigidity of the tubes despite infilling, burial and potential elasticity, infers that the organisms may have been alive, or very recently dead during burial and infilling. This further implies a rapid preservation of Colinetia, aided by the surrounding diagenetic chemical reactions occurring between volcanic glass shards and pore waters, as well as potential high concentrations of dissolved silica in the water at the time. Alongside this, chlorite clusters have also been found in the infills, which may have further aided in the quick preservation of Colinetia, cementing the fill itself. The overlying sediments of unfilled tubes also implies that the tubes in life were resistant in nature, and may have been partially buried already.

== Palaeoecology ==
With its discoidal holdfast, and long tubular structure consisting of two tubes, the main tube and small inner tube, Colinetia is considered to have had a tube-in-tube body plan. The smaller inner tube is inferred to have been buoyant and free to move in life, due to the lack of uniformity of the inner tube in a single specimen. The infilling of this inner tube either required an opening at the distal end of the main tube in order to permit the infilling, or for a rupture to have occurred near the distal end.

Unlike a majority of fossils in the Newfoundland area, Colinetia is noted to have felled in random orientations, and information gathered from its taphonomy suggest a recumbent lifestyle, although researchers note that an upright or hybrid lifestyle it not impossible, with many younger Ediacaran fossils having been inferred as recumbent, semi-infaunal, or upright, and with a basal holdfast. All three of these lifestyles were explored for Colinetia, although all noted as speculative until further sites and fossils are found, and are as follows:

=== Upright lifestyle ===
An upright lifestyle would match that of most other Ediacaran petalonamids worldwide, with its holdfast structure anchored to the seafloor, whilst the tube would extend up into the water column. In this interpretation, the fossil beds of Colinetia would represent a death assemblage that occurred in very quiet, cold water conditions, although again the taphonomic preservation of Colinetia limits this interpretation.

=== Recumbent/semi-faunal lifestyle ===
A recumbent or semi-faunal lifestyle would suggest that all fossil specimens of Colinetia were alive at the time of burial, being killed by the injection of sediments into the inner tube. This lifestyle lines up with the taphonomic preservation and random orientation of Colinetia, with the tubes growing in differing directions in life. Colinetia itself may have been almost bully buried, with the distal end of the organism raising out of the sediment to feed. Although one issue that is noted to arise is the notably large discoidal holdfast discs, something that would not be needed in an organism with either a recumbent or semi-faunal lifestyle.

=== Upright to recumbent/semi-faunal lifestyle ===
One last point that the researchers raise is that Colinetia may have started out standing upright when young, later becoming recumbent on top of the seafloor either due to disturbance or their increasing mass. Not only would this line up with the preservation of the fossils seen, but also explain the need for a holdfast structure. Alongside this, researchers also noted that the slow loss in buoyancy due to their increasing mass and weight as they grew upward would also explain the sinuosity of the fossils.

== Affinities ==
Colinetia has been compared to a multitude of organisms, which are as follows:

=== Algal organism ===
Colinetia is noted to bear similarities to many tubular algae, both extinct and extant, being compared to the extant Ulva intestinalis, which has a similar tubular structure that is distally closed, alongside a disc-like holdfast, alongside Valonia and Boergesenia. It was also compared to extinct forms of algae, such as Proterocladus, Fuxianospira, and Protoarenicola, which all have a similar tube-like construction, a disc-like holdfast, and some even preserving as moulds in mudstones. Despite this, it is noted that the extreme depths that Colinetia lived in would have had little to no sunlight, and also the extreme size of Colinetia is much larger than many of these algae.

=== Tubular organism ===
Colinetia was then compared to the extinct Ediacaran organism Aulozoon from the Rawnsley Quartzite in Australia, and recently deep-water strata of the Blueflower Formation in Canada. Aulozoon is composed of a long tube-like structure, unoriented in life and also occasionally sinuous in nature, similar to that seen in fossils of Colinetia. Alongside this, both organisms show evidence of a bounding membrane, inferred from Aulozoon through iron minerals, and Colinetia through authigenic clays. Although, Aulozoon is noted to only have a small holdfast, and no inner-tube present. Despite this, researchers noted that Colinetia and Aulozoon bear many similarities to each other overall, being long, soft-bodied tubular organisms with basal holdfasts. Another organisms noted to bear these similarities is Funisia and Plexus ricei, both also from the Rawnsley Quartzite, which are noted to have a tube-in-tube construction, whilst Funisia also bears a holdfast structure. However, researchers noted that Funisia and Plexus are modular in nature, whilst Colinetia is not, and also that Plexus does not have any known holdfast.

=== Petalonamid organism ===
Colinetia has also been noted to bear some similarities to the petalonamids, which commonly have a basal disc-like holdfast structure, and a short to long stem with a frond on top. Despite this, excluding the singular, poorly preserved distally flared specimen, no other specimens of Colinetia bear any fronds, although it is also noted that the fronds are the least likely part of the petalonamid to preserve properly or fully. Alongside this, if the proposed taphonomic preservation of Colinetia is likely, being injected with sediments from the bottom-up, the frond is even-less likely to preserve in this manner when compared to the common Conception-style preservation in Newfoundland. It has also been noted that despite superb preservation of fronds in other localities, many still feature a wide collection of lone discs, some with only stems attached, with fronds being scarce in Fermeuse-style preservation, specially in deep water strata. Also noted is that for the infilling of the tube to have occurred, it will have needed a distally open end with no frond, or a frond with a distal rupture.
