= List of fossiliferous stratigraphic units in Newfoundland and Labrador =

This is a list of fossiliferous stratigraphic units in Newfoundland and Labrador.

Group or Formation	Period	Notes
Anguille Group/"Anguille strata" Formation	Carboniferous	
Bay du Nord series Formation	Devonian	
Bonavista Group/West Centre Cove Formation	Cambrian	
Brigus Formation	Cambrian	
Chamberlain's Brook Formation	Cambrian	
Chapel Island Formation	Cambrian	
Codroy Group/Big Cove Formation	Carboniferous	
Codroy Group/Woody Cove beds Formation	Carboniferous	
Conception and St. John's Group/Trepassey and Fermeuses Formation	Canada	
Conception Group/Briscal Formation	Ediacaran	
Conception Group/Drook Formation	Ediacaran	
Conception Group/Gaskiers Formation	Ediacaran	
Conception Group/Mistaken Point Formation	Ediacaran	
Cow Head Group/Green Point Formation	Ordovician, Cambrian	
Cow Head Group/Shallow Bay Formation	Ordovician, Cambrian	
Forteau Formation	Cambrian	
Goose Tickle Group/Black Cove Formation	Ordovician	
Labrador Group/Forteau Formation	Cambrian	
Long Point Group/Lourdes Formation	Ordovician	
Long Point Group/Lourdes Limestone Formation	Ordovician	
Middle Arm Point Formation	Tremadocian	
Port Au Port Group/Petit Jardin Formation	Cambrian	
Redmond Formation	Cretaceous	
Saxicava Clay Formation	Canada	
Searston Beds Formation	Carboniferous	
St John's Group/Fermeuse Formation	Ediacaran	
St John's Group/Renews Head Formation	Ediacaran	
St John's Group/Trepassey Formation	Ediacaran	
St. George Group/Boat Harbour Formation	Ordovician	
St. George Group/Catoche FormationFormation	Ordovician	
St. George Group/Watts Bight Formation	Ordovician	
St. John's Group/Trepassey Formation	Ediacaran	
Table Head Group/Table Cove Formation	Ordovician	
Table Head Group/Table Point Formation	Ordovician	
Table Point Formation	Ordovician	
Windsor Formation	Carboniferous	
