= Drook Formation =

Geologic formation In Canada

- Stratigraphic range: late Ediacaran; ~579.88–574 Ma
- Type: Formation
- Unit of: Conception Group
- Sub-units: Clam Cove, Peter's River, Biscay, Cape English, Torbay, Bauline Line and Broad Cove River Members
- Underlies: Briscal Formation; Mistaken Point Formation
- Overlies: Gaskiers Formation
- Thickness: 770 m (2,526 ft)

Lithology
- Primary: Siliceous Siltstone
- Other: Sandstone, Tuff

Location
- Region: Newfoundland and Labrador
- Country: Canada

Type section
- Named for: Drook
- Named by: S.B. Misra
- Year defined: 1971

The Drook Formation is a geologic formation in Newfoundland and Labrador. It preserves fossils dating back to the Ediacaran period which have been dated to 575.8 ± 0.5 million years ago, making them the oldest macroscopic complex fossils in Newfoundland until the discovery of fossils in the pre-Gaskiers glaciation Rocky Harbour Formation and underlying Mall Bay Formation.

== Geology ==
The Drook Formation is predominately composed of well-bedded banded green cherts, silicified siltstones, and argillites. A majority of the chert beds contain the silicified siltstones, and range in thickness from a fraction of an inch to 2 in (51 mm). The base of the formation is not exposed, as such its full thickness is unknown. It can be found outcropping in the Conception Bay area and the Avalon Peninsula.

== Paleoenvironment ==
The depositional environment of the formation was first considered to be that of a shallow-marine environment inferred from the high silica content of the rocks, the abundance of calcareous nodules, as well as large ripple marks covering exposed surfaces.

A later study done in 2003 would suggest that the Drook Formation was deposited on a deep basin-floor, due to the thick bedding and coarser grains found within it, and the evidence of both south-westerly and north-easterly paleocurrents. This was further supported with the study of the Drook Formation in the Conception Bay area confirming that sediments were likely deposited in a deep distal-fan to basin-plain environment, again inferred from the thickness of the various layers, and the discovery of medium-association bedded turbidites.

== Dating ==
Both the base and top of the Drook formation has been dated using U–Pb dating and various zircon crystal samples. Samples collected from the top of the underlying Gaskiers Formation, and thus the base of the Drook Formation, recovered a date of 579.88±0 Ma, whilst samples collected from the top of the formation recovered a date of 575±0 Ma.

== Paleobiota ==
The Drook Formation is home to a small collection of fossils only found on its outcrops within the Avalon Peninsula, which are predominately frondose in nature, such as the tall Trepassia and the classic Charnia. Specimens of poorly preserved organisms in the form of Ivesheadiomorphs are also present, including the Blackbrookia form. The formation also notably contains an abundance of the cone-like fossil Thectardis, numbering up to 140 known specimens, and constituting up to 58% of the known fossil community, with the formation also serving as the type locality for the holotype fossil.

There can also be found an assemblage entirely composed of juvenile fronds, including juvenile stages of Charnia and Trepassia, and is the first fossil assemblage to be dominated by juvenile frondose forms in the Ediacaran, providing rare insights into the ontogeny and ecology of the rangeomorphs.

The fossils from this formation for a number of decades were considered to be the oldest examples of complex Ediacaran fossils in Newfoundland, although this would change in 2020 with the discovery of Palaeopascichnus and tentative Orbisiana fossils the Rocky Harbour Formation, which has been dated to 579 million years ago, making them 3 million years older than the Drook fossils.

Color key: Taxon / Reclassified taxon / Taxon falsely reported as present / Dubious taxon or junior synonym / Ichnotaxon / Ootaxon / Morphotaxon

Notes
Uncertain or tentative taxa are in small text
~~crossed out~~ taxa are discredited.

=== Petalonamae ===
Genus	Species	Notes	Images
Charnia	C. masoni	Sessile frondose organism.	
Charniodiscus	Charniodiscus sp.	Sessile frondose organism.	
Trepassia	T. wardae	Sessile frondose organism. Previously reported under the genus Charnia as Charnia wardi.	
Vinlandia	V. antecedens	Sessile frondose organism. Previously reported under the genus Charnia as Charnia antecedens.	

=== incertae sedis ===
Genus	Species	Notes	Images
Aspidella	A. terranovica	Enigmatic discoidal fossil.	
Thectardis	T. avalonensis	Sessile cone-like organism, they are the most abundant fossil in the Drook Formation.	

=== Ivesheadiomorph ===
Genus	Species	Notes	Images
Ivesheadia	Ivesheadia sp.	Poorly preserved organism.	
Blackbrookia	Blackbrookia sp.	Poorly preserved organism.	

=== Undescribed ===
Genus	Species	Notes	Images
Filaments	???	Filamentous fossils numbering up to 139 in total, ranging in lengths of 6–130 mm (0–5 in), affinities remain unknown.	

== See also ==
- List of fossiliferous stratigraphic units in Newfoundland and Labrador
