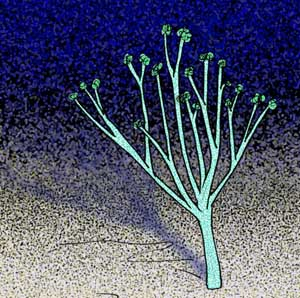

Scientific classification
- Kingdom: Animalia
- Phylum: incertae sedis
- Genus: †Parviscopa; Hofmann, O'Brien & King, 2008
- Species: †P. bonavistensis

Binomial name
- †Parviscopa bonavistensis Hofmann, O'Brien & King, 2008

= Parviscopa =

Parviscopa Temporal range: Ediacaran, 580–560 Ma

Extinct genus of Ediacaran lifeform

Parviscopa is a genus of frondose forms characterized in 2008 based on specimens from Newfoundland, Canada. Parviscopa is a member of the Ediacaran biota (635-542 Ma), and is more specifically part of the Avalon type assemblage, which is from the older part of the Ediacaran (580–560 Ma) and is characterized by deep water deposits.

== Description ==
Parviscopa Hofmann et al. 2008 is similar to other frondose forms. It has a stem and branches and can appear plant-like. Specimens are typically between 2-3 centimeters in length. Parviscopa is found at the Bonavista Peninsula in Newfoundland, Canada and has been assigned to the phylum Petalonamae Pflug 1972. It is similar to the genus Primocandelabrum, which is also found in the same region, but Parviscopa is smaller and has better defined branches and lacks a basal attachment disc.

== Diversity ==
Parviscopa bonavistensis is the only known species within the genus. There are presently only a few known specimens of Parviscopa, of which the type specimen is NFM F-507. Parviscopa is differentiated from Primocandelabrum because of its lack of a basal attachment disc. Some researchers have suggested that it is possible that Parviscopa is a juvenile Primocandelabrum without a preserved disc.

== Discovery ==
Parviscopa was described by Hofmann, O'Brien, and King in 2008. It was discovered at the Bonavista Peninsula in Newfoundland, Canada leading to the species name of bonavistensis. Parviscopa means little broom made of twigs which refers to the appearance of the specimens. The specimens appear to look like typical trace fossils, but researchers agree that they represent body fossils.

== Distribution ==
The known distribution of Parviscopa is currently limited to the Avalon type assemblage in the Mistaken Point Formation of Newfoundland, Canada.

== Ecology ==
Parviscopa lived in the deep sea with other similar organisms. They were sessile organisms that were attached to the sea floor and were likely suspension feeders. They may have fed through osmosis or filter feeding. The area they lived in was probably too deep for organisms to photosynthesize.

== Significance ==
Parviscopa is unique because it does not have rangeomorph branching like many of the other Avalonian taxa. Although Parviscopa is a body fossil, it resembles many trace fossils. It has also not been resolved if Parviscopa actually belongs to Primocandelabrum or if it is its own separate genus (see Diversity). Primocandelabrum and Parviscopa do not resemble larger taxa, and they are both only a few centimeters in length.

== See also ==
- List of Ediacaran genera
- Mistaken Point, Newfoundland and Labrador
- Avalonia
