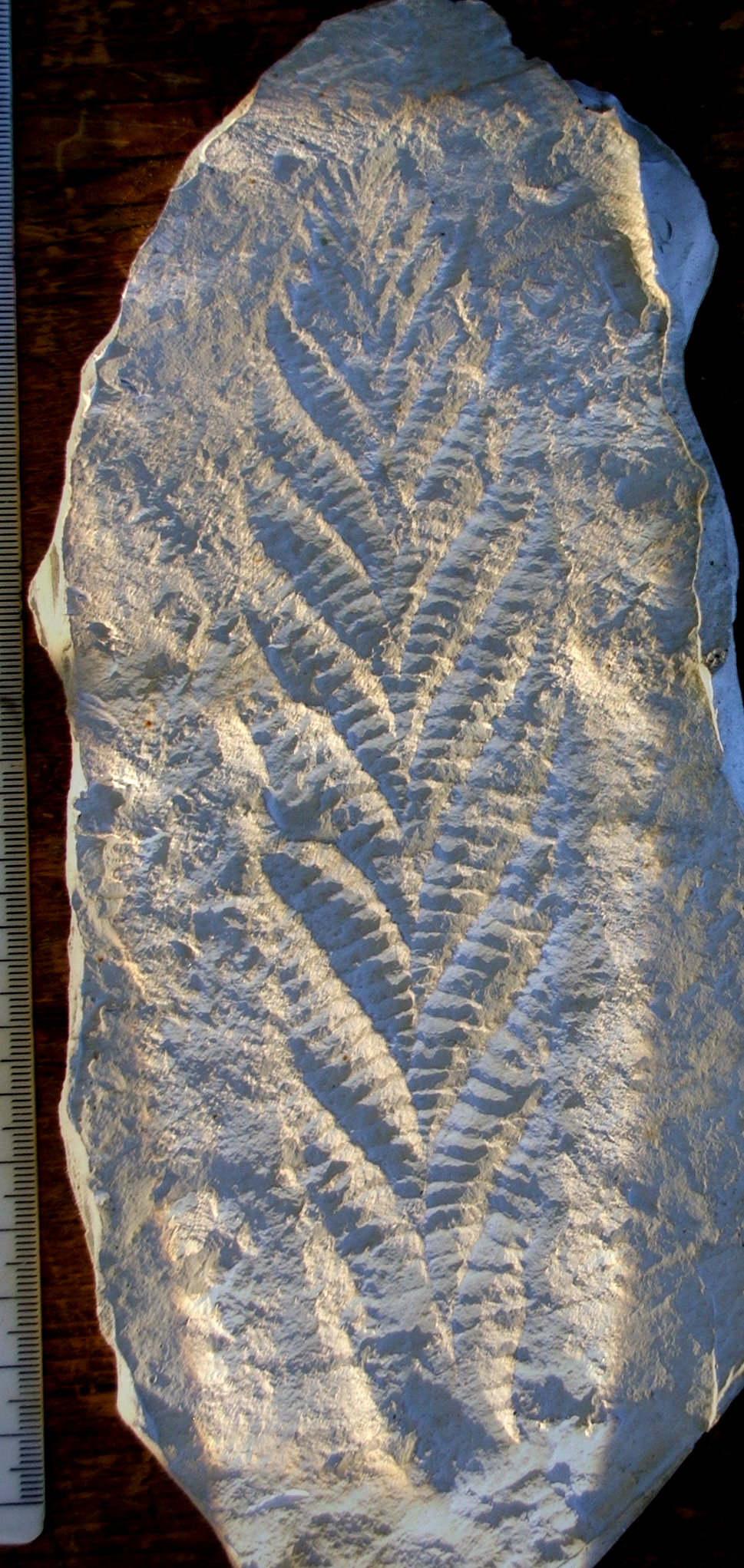
- Charnia masoni.

Scientific classification
- Kingdom: Animalia
- Phylum: †Petalonamae
- Clade: †Rangeomorpha
- Family: †Charniidae; Glaessner 1979

Type genus
- †Charnia Ford, 1958

Genera
- See text

= Charniidae =

Charniidae Temporal range: 635–505 Ma Ediacaran

Plant fossil of the family rangeomorpha

Charniidae is a family of rangeomorphs. It is the only non-monotypic family of Rangeomorpha.

== Distribution ==
From the Ediacaran of Australia, Canada, Russia and the United Kingdom, to the Cambrian of Canada.

== Taxonomy ==
The family presents 6 genera:

- †Beothukis
- †Bomakellia
- †Bradgatia
- †Charnia
- †Culmofrons
- †Paracharnia

== Gallery ==
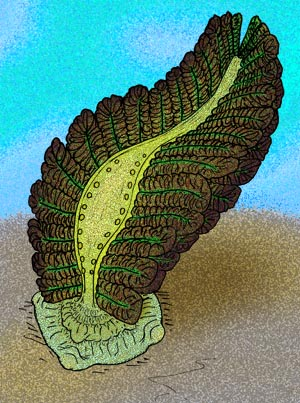
Artists interpretation of the enigmatic Bomakellia kelleri.

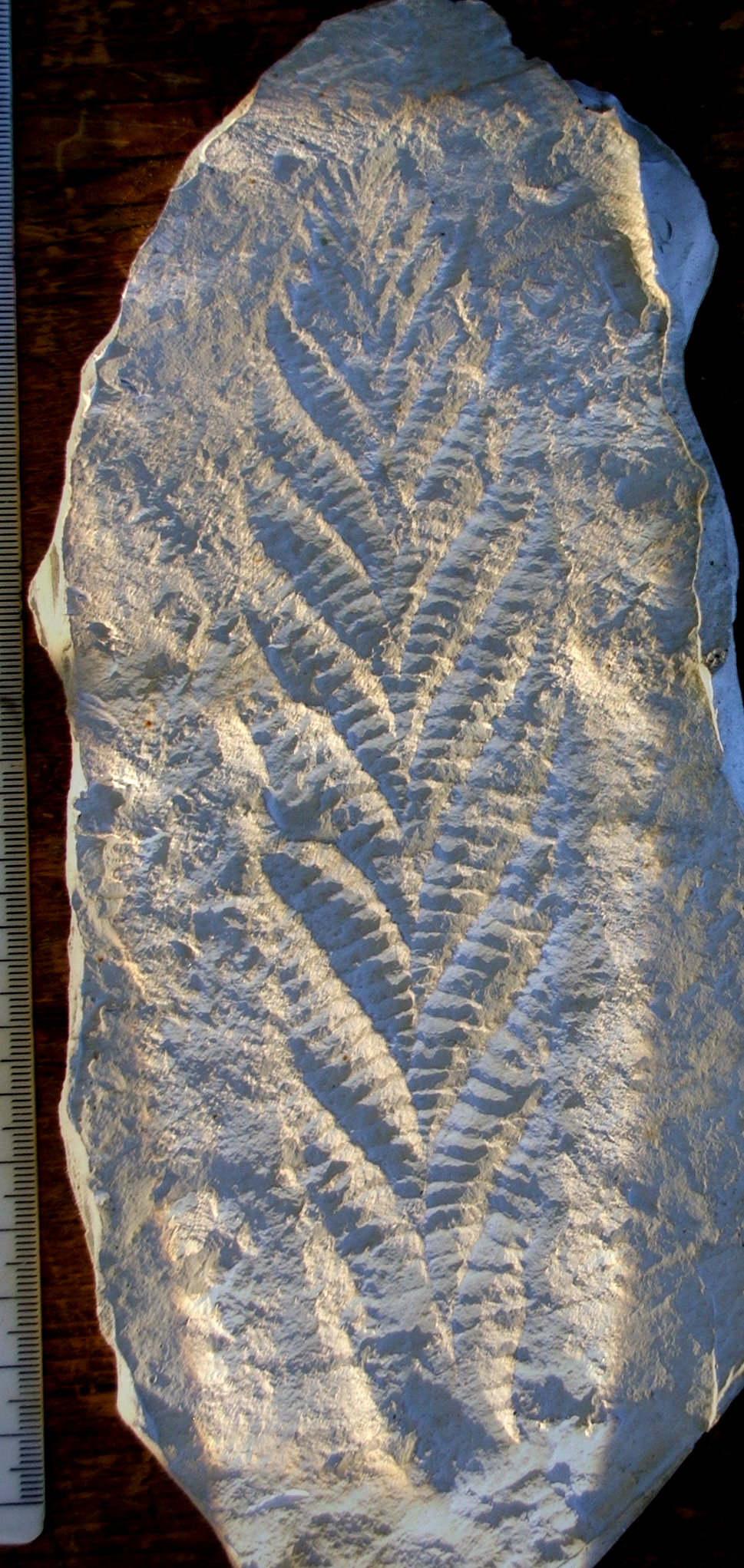
Fossil specimen of Charnia masoni.

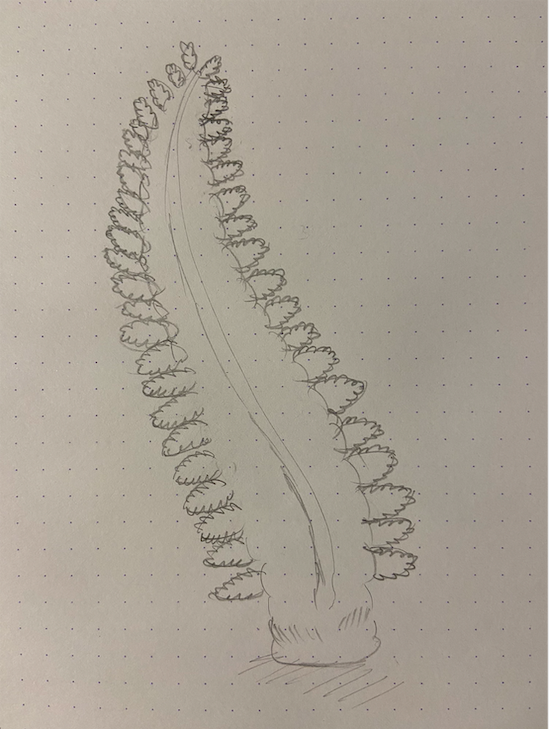
Artists interpretation of Paracharnia dengyingensis.

== See also ==
- Rangea
