= First life =

First life may refer to

- How life arose from non-life: see Abiogenesis
- First life forms
- First Life (TV series)
