= Mall Bay Formation =

Geologic formation in Newfoundland, Canada

- Stratigraphic range: early Ediacaran; ~606–580.90 Ma
- Type: Formation
- Unit of: Conception Group
- Underlies: Gaskiers Formation
- Overlies: (Unconformably) Harbour Main Group
- Thickness: 800 m (2,600 ft)

Lithology
- Primary: Mudstone
- Other: Sandstone, Diamictite

Location
- Region: Newfoundland and Labrador
- Country: Canada
- Outcrop distribution on Avalon peninsula, Newfoundland

The Mall Bay Formation is an early Ediacaran aged formation, cropping out in Newfoundland and possibly elsewhere. It is part of the Conception Group, and contains evidence of an earlier start for the Gaskiers glaciation. It also currently contains the oldest, large macroscopic fossils from the Ediacaran of Newfoundland.

== Geology ==
The Mall Bay Formation can be found outcropping on the Colinet Islands in St. Mary's Bay, Newfoundland and Labrador. A part of the larger Conception Group, it is overlain by the glacial Gaskiers Formation, whilst it is unconformably underlain by the volcanic Harbour Main Group.

The formation itself is predominately composed of turbiditic laminated mudstones, with thin layers of feldspathic arenite, tuff, pyroclastic rocks, and turbiditic fine-grained sandstones found throughout. There can also be found increasing towards the top of the formation folded and structureless mudstones, with diamictite found at the very top of the formation.

=== Glacial deposits ===
A recent study has found that this formation preserves evidence that the Gaskiers glaciation, which had previously been restricted to the Gaskiers Formation and only lasting roughly 1 million years, had actually begun a lot earlier than originally thought. This has been inferred through the discovery of glacial deposits like dropstones and clasts some 300–500 m (980–1,640 ft) below the Gaskiers base, giving the Gaskiers glaciation a duration of somewhere between 1.05 Ma to 4.8 Ma, up from the previous estimate of 350 ka to 1.6 Ma.

== Dating ==
The Mall Bay Formation has been dated using U–pd dating on several zircon samples collected from the top, and below the base. The samples from the top of the Mall Bay Formation were collected from two tuff beds on Great Colinet Island, roughly 6.55–7.55 m (21.5–24.8 ft) below the base of the overlying Gaskiers Formation, with the samples yielding an average deposition date of 580.90±0.04 Ma. Samples from just below the base of the Mall Bay Formation were collected from a layer of ash-flow tuff at the top of the underlying Harbour Main Group, with the samples yielding a date of 606±0.04 Ma.

== Paleoenvironment ==
Due to the notable abundance of turbidites, the formation has been inferred to have been deposited in a deep-water environment below the storm-wave base, similar to other formations within the wider Conception Group. Alongside this, with the upper 300–500 m (980–1,640 ft) of the formation containing an increasing number of glacial deposits, the environment itself may have been that of a cold-water environment as well.

== Paleobiota ==
The Mall Bay Formation is known to contain numerous disc-like structures, most which bear the appearance of Aspidella, whilst some are notably much larger in size, and feature attached stalks. These larger structures were originally referred to as "Colinet structures", after the area in which they were found in, before being formally named Colinetia daltonensis, and which have been noted to be similar to younger tubular organisms from the Ediacaran, such as Aulozoon, or to petalonamid organisms, suggesting probable evolutionary affinities.

They also predate the previously oldest and largest macroscopic fossils from the Drook Formation by some 8 – 10 Ma, resulting in researchers looking at the potential inorganic and organic origins of the "Colinet structures", with the organic origin being favoured. Although it has been noted that some of the "Colinet structures", such as the lone disc-like structures, are also likely formed by inorganic processes, being formed by sediment volcanoes.

Color key: Taxon / Reclassified taxon / Taxon falsely reported as present / Dubious taxon or junior synonym / Ichnotaxon / Ootaxon / Morphotaxon

Notes
Uncertain or tentative taxa are in small text
~~crossed out~~ taxa are discredited.

=== incertae sedis ===
Genus	Species	Notes	Images
Aspidella (?)	Aspidella (?) sp.	Discoidal organisms, have been noted to possibly be a hypo-relief impressions of Colinetia.	
Colinetia	C. daltonensis	Large, stalked discoidal organism.	
