= 32nd News & Documentary Emmy Awards =

- Date: September 26, 2011
- Location: Rose Hall, Home of Jazz at Lincoln Center; New York City

The 32nd News & Documentary Emmy Awards were held on September 26, 2011, at Rose Hall, Home of Jazz at Lincoln Center, located in the Time Warner Center in New York City. They honored the best in American news and documentary programming in 2010. Awards were presented in 42 categories, including Breaking News, Investigative Reporting, Outstanding Interview, and Best Documentary. In attendance were over 900 television and news media industry executives, news and documentary producers and journalists.

Notable awards included the Lifetime Achievement Award given to television and radio host Larry King.

== Winners ==
=== Network breakdown ===
The following chart is a breakdown of number of awards won this awards season per station.

Channel	Number of Emmys This Season
CBS	10
National Geographic Channel	7
PBS	6
Discovery Channel	3
CNN	2
NBC	2
The New York Times	2
HBO	1
BBC America	1
CNBC	1
HDNet	1
Los Angeles Times	1
MSNBC	1
NPR	1
Smithsonian Channel	1
KMGH (Denver)	1
WMAQ (Chicago)	1

=== Breakdown by program ===
Program	Channel	Number of Emmy's This Season
60 Minutes	CBS	7
CBS Evening News	CBS	2
CBS News Sunday Morning	CBS	1
National Geographic Explorer	National Geographic Channel	2
Great Migrations	National Geographic Channel	2
Restrepo: Afghan Outpost	National Geographic Channel	2
Witness: Katrina	National Geographic Channel	1
POV	PBS	4
Frontline	PBS	2
Independent Lens	PBS	1
Frontline Fall Image Campaign	PBS	1
First Life with David Attenborough	Discovery Channel	3
Anderson Cooper 360°	CNN	2
NBC Nightly News	NBC	1
Dateline NBC	NBC	1
The New York Times	The New York Times	1
The New York Times Magazine Online]	The New York Times	1
BBC America World News	BBC America	1
CNBC Original: Trash Inc.	CNBC	1
HBO Documentary Films	HBO	1
Dan Rather Reports	HDNet	1
Caught in the Crossfire: Victims of Gang Violence	Los Angeles Times	1
The Rachel Maddow Show	MSNBC	1
NPR Music Presents Project Song	NPR	1
Hindenburg: The Untold Story	Smithsonian Channel	1
7News	KMGH (Denver, Colorado)	1
10PM Spot News	WMAQ (Chicago, Illinois)	1

=== Awards ===
Lifetime Achievement Award	Chairman's Award
Larry King	
Regularly Scheduled Newscast	News Magazine
Coverage of a Breaking News Story; Haiti in Ruins, Anderson Cooper 360° (CNN); Continuing Coverage of a News Story; Afghan Bomb Squad, CBS Evening News (CBS); Feature Story; Inside the North Korean Bubble, BBC World News America (BBC America); Investigative Journalism; Photocopiers Hidden Dangers, CBS Evening News (CBS); Business And Economic Reporting; Paving the Way, CBS News Sunday Morning (CBS)	Coverage of a Breaking News Story; The Blowout, 60 Minutes (CBS); Continuing Coverage of a News Story; America Now: Friends and Neighbors, Dateline NBC (NBC); Feature Story; Football Island, 60 Minutes (CBS); Investigative Journalism; 21st Century Snake Oil, 60 Minutes (CBS); Business And Economic Reporting; The Mysterious Case of Kevin Xu, Dan Rather Reports (HDNet); News Discussion And Analysis; Good Morning, Landlocked Central Asia, The Rachel Maddow Show (MSNBC)
Long Form	Interview
Live Coverage of a Current News Story; Crisis in Haiti, Anderson Cooper 360° (CNN); Continuing Coverage of a News Story; ''Restrepo: Afghan Outpost (National Geographic Channel); Investigative Journalism; Presumed Guilty, POV (PBS); Informational Programming; Food Inc, POV (PBS); Historical Programming; Witness: Katrina (National Geographic Channel); Business And Economic Reporting; Good Fortune, POV (PBS)	Medal of Honor, 60 Minutes (CBS)
Programming	Best Story In A Regularly Scheduled Newscast
Arts & Culture; Art & Copy, Independent Lens (PBS); Science And Technology; Google Baby , HBO Documentary Films (HBO); Nature; First Life with David Attenborough, (Discovery Channel)	Mexico: The War Next Door, NBC Nightly News (NBC)
Best Report In A News Magazine	Best Documentary
The Blowout, 60 Minutes (CBS) (tie); The Lost Children of Haiti, 60 Minutes (CBS) (tie)	Food, Inc., POV (PBS)
New Approaches To News & Documentary Programming:	Individual Achievement In A Craft:
Current News Coverage; A Year At War (The New York Times); Documentaries; Caught in the Crossfire: Victims of Gang Violence, (Los Angeles Times); Arts, Lifestyle & Culture; 14 Actors Acting New York Times Magazine Online (The New York Times) (tie); Moby NPR Music Presents Project Song (NPR) (tie)	Writing; First Life with David Attenborough, (Discovery Channel); Research; Can the Gulf Survive?, National Geographic Explorer (National Geographic Channel); Cinematography - Nature; Great Migrations, (National Geographic Channel); Cinematography - News Coverage / Documentaries; Lost Mummies of New Guinea, National Geographic Explorer (National Geographic Channel); Editing; Restrepo: Afghan Outpost, (National Geographic Channel); Quick Turnaround; Haiti, 60 Minutes (CBS); Graphic Design & Art Direction; First Life with David Attenborough, (Discovery Channel); Music & Sound; Great Migrations, (National Geographic Channel); Lighting Direction & Scenic Design; Hindenburg: The Untold Story, (Smithsonian Channel)
Promotional Announcement	Regional News Story
Institutional; Frontline Fall Image Campaign (PBS); Episodic; Garbage Ballet CNBC Original: Trash Inc. (CNBC)	Spot News; Burr Oak Cemetery Scandal, 10PM Spot News (WMAQ (Chicago, Illinois)); Investigative Reporting; 33 Minutes to 34 Right, 7News (KMGH (Denver, Colorado))

== Nominees ==
- By station

== Presenters ==
- Scott Pelley, anchor and managing editor, CBS News and correspondent, 60 Minutes
- Brian Ross, chief investigative correspondent, ABC News
- Gwen Ifill, moderator and managing editor, Washington Week and senior correspondent, The PBS NewsHour
- Sanjay Gupta, chief medical correspondent, CNN
- Sheila Nevins, president, HBO Documentary Films
- Lawrence O'Donnell, host, MSNBC's The Last Word
- Bill Small, past chairman, News & Documentary Emmy Awards
- Bruce Paisner, President & CEO, International Academy of Television Arts and Sciences
