= Xmas tree =

Xmas tree may refer to:

- A colloquial abbreviation for a Christmas tree
- The more common spelling for the oilfield Christmas tree
- The name given to the set of lights used for starting a drag race
- Frondophyllas, extinct, monotypic animal genus in the clade Rangeomorpha
