= Middle Arm =

Middle Arm may refer to:

== Australia ==
- Middle Arm, Northern Territory

== Canada ==
- Middle Arm, Avalon Peninsula, Newfoundland and Labrador
- Middle Arm, Baie Verte Peninsula, Newfoundland and Labrador
- Middle Arm Bridge, in Vancouver

== See also ==
- Middle Arm Point Formation, a rock formation in Western Newfoundland, Canada
