= Catoche Formation =

Geological formation

Catoche FormationFormation
- Stratigraphic range: Ordovician
- Type: Formation

Location
- Region: Newfoundland and Labrador
- Country: Canada

The Catoche Formation is a Lower Ordovician shallow-marine carbonate succession within the St. George Group of western Newfoundland, consisting primarily of well-bedded limestones that were deposited on a tropical carbonate platform in subtidal to peritidal environments. It is characterized by a variety of carbonate facies, including lime mudstones, wackestones, packstones, and grainstones, as well as minor dolostone intervals. The formation is highly fossiliferous and includes diverse marine fauna such as trilobites, brachiopods, gastropods, cephalopods, and sponges, reflecting open-marine shelf conditions during deposition.

== See also ==
- List of fossiliferous stratigraphic units in Newfoundland and Labrador
