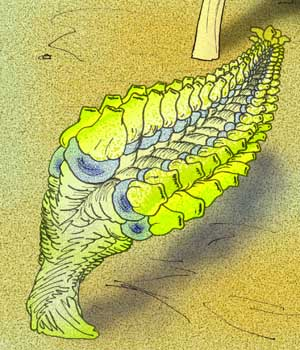
- Reconstruction of Pambikalbae

Scientific classification
- Kingdom: Animalia
- Phylum: †Petalonamae
- Clade: †Rangeomorpha
- Genus: †Pambikalbae; Jenkins and Nedin, 2007
- Species: †P. hasenohrae

Binomial name
- †Pambikalbae hasenohrae Jenkins and Nedin, 2007

= Pambikalbae =

Pambikalbae Temporal range: Ediacaran, about 555 Ma

Extinct genus of Ediacaran lifeform

Pambikalbae is a monospecific genus known from the Ediacaran Period (approximately 555 million years ago) of South Australia. Its morphology resembles the morphology of colonial cnidarians, such as sea pens or siphonophores.

== Description ==
Pambikalbae had a broad, frondose-shaped body composed of multiple vanes extending from an axial stem, and containing a serial series of chambers. Specimens of Pambikalbae found thus far have measured approximately 20 to 30 cm in length, with a width of 12 cm at the widest point of the frondose-body, and 6.6 cm wide at the stem.

== Diversity ==
Pambikalbae is a monospecific genus, with only one known species, Pambikalbae hasenohrae.

== Discovery ==
Pambikalbae hasenohrae was discovered within a fossiliferous exposure on the Nilpena pastoral property in the Flinders Ranges in South Australia. Pamela Hasenohr, an amateur geologist, found and brought the Pambikalbae fossils to the attention of Richard Jenkins, a research associate of the South Australian Museum. Richard Jenkins and his associate Chris Nedin collected five Pambikalbae specimens from this exposure, and published their description of the genus in 2007. In this publication, they named the type species of the genus, P. hasenohrae, after Pamela Hasenohr. The name of the genus is a combination of Parnkalla words pambi (meaning "small bag or purse", in reference to the chamber like structure) and kalbi (meaning "leaf").

== Distribution ==
Pambikalbae hasenohrae specimens have been found preserved in channel sandstones on the Nilpena pastoral property in the Flinders Ranges of South Australia. These sandstones occur directly below the Ediacaran Member of the Rawnsley Quartzite, a stratigraphic layer rich with Ediacaran fossils that was deposited during cycles of marine transgression.

== Taphonomy ==
Pambikalbae hasenohrae fossils consist of both surface molds and internal casts. It is likely that the hollow chambers of these specimens were partly filled with sediments before their entire bodies were buried, preventing the bodies from being entirely flattened during burial and preserving the three-dimensional structure of both the internal and external parts of the original organisms. The lithified sands that occupy the once hollow parts of the specimens exhibit fine laminations and small scale crossbedding, which indicates that the specimens were buried progressively, not instantly. This gradual burial may have created enough time for currents to carry sediments into the internal chambers before the entire organism was buried.

== Ecology ==
Pambikalbae was likely a benthic, sessile, heterotrophic marine suspension feeder. The chambers of Pambikalbae were open to the external environment, allowing water to enter and exit freely. These chambers were likely lined with flagellate cells or cilia, which would capture detrital food particles suspended in the water.

== See also ==
- List of Ediacaran genera
