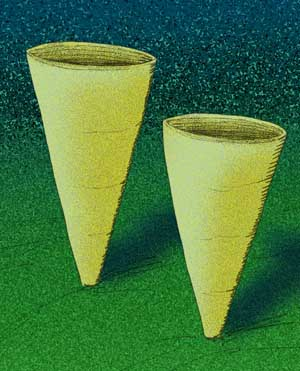
- Artist's reconstruction

Scientific classification
- Kingdom: Animalia
- Phylum: incertae sedis
- Genus: †Thectardis; Clapham et al., 2004
- Species: †T. avalonensis

Binomial name
- †Thectardis avalonensis Clapham et al., 2004

= Thectardis =

Thectardis Temporal range: Ediacaran,574–565 Ma

Member of the Ediacaran biota

Thectardis avalonensis is a triangular-shaped member of the Ediacaran biota, dating from 574 to 565 million years ago. The organism took the form of an elongated cone with a central depression, and its apex was anchored to the substrate. Sperling et al. (2011) suggest that Thectardis was a sponge, while Antcliffe et al. (2014, 2015) instead suggest that it is the decayed remains of rangeomorphs.

== Morphology ==
The fossils take the form of a triangle with a central depression, suggesting that the original organism was conical. They range from 26 to 165 mm in length and from 24 to 96 mm in width at the triangular base. The diameter to height ratio of the organism is roughly constant in each location at 1 to 3 in the younger beds, and from 1 to 2.5 in the older beds. The constant ratio suggests that it grew by adding to its body at the base of the cone. The triangle has a raised margin about a quarter of the width of the triangle. The interior either is blank, depressed, or has some vague transverse markings. The impression occurs in the upper bed rather than the lower surface.

== Occurrence ==
A total of 205 specimens of Thectardis are known, from two bedding surfaces, separated by 2 km and 10 million years at Mistaken Point, Newfoundland.

Thectardis bearing bedding surfaces also contain Charnia and Ivesheadia.

Twelve specimens of Thectardis also known from a new location; these fossilised animal remains were discovered on the bedding planes of the Sonia Formation of Marwar Super Group, which is exposed in the Sursagar region of Jodhpur, India.

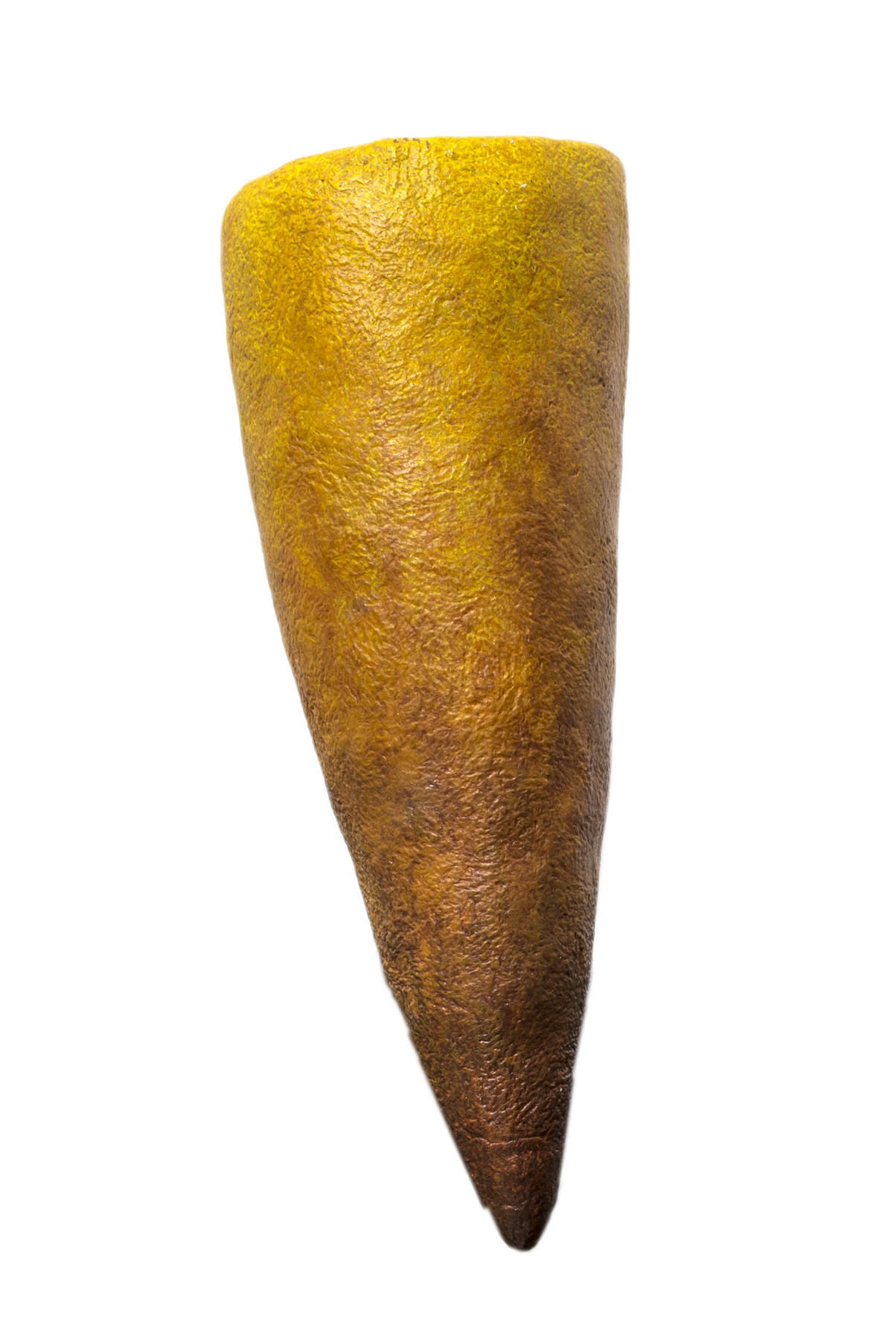
Thectardis avalonensis - Life restoration at MUSE - Science Museum in Trento

== Ecology ==
Water currents knocked down the triangles in the same direction, and where they fall on top of other objects they flex over the top. When alive, the organism probably stuck to the microbial mats that bound the Ediacaran sea floor, standing on their tips like a pin in a pin cushion, so that the organism would have resembled an inverted cone. They probably fed on suspended particles. As there is no evidence for a holdfast anchoring them to the sea floor, it remains a matter of speculation how they were attached.

== Etymology ==
The generic name Thectardis is derived from the Greek thektos, sharp-pointed, and ardis, arrow-point. The specific name derives from the Avalon Peninsula, where it was found. Thus, Thectardis avalonensis translates as "sharp arrow-point of Avalon (Peninsula)."

== See also ==
- List of Ediacaran genera
