= Woody Cove beds Formation =

Geologic formation in Newfoundland and Labrador, Canada

- Stratigraphic range: Triassic
- Type: Formation

Location
- Region: Newfoundland and Labrador
- Country: Canada

The Woody Cove beds Formation is a geologic formation in Newfoundland and Labrador. It preserves fossils dating back to the Triassic period.

== See also ==
- List of fossiliferous stratigraphic units in Newfoundland and Labrador
