= Paracharnia =

Paracharnia Temporal range: 551–541 Ma
- A line drawing of the holotype specimen of Paracharnia dengyingensis

Scientific classification
- Kingdom: Animalia
- Phylum: †Petalonamae
- Clade: †Rangeomorpha
- Family: †Charniidae
- Genus: †Paracharnia; Sun, 1986
- Species: †P. dengyingensis

Binomial name
- †Paracharnia dengyingensis (Ding and Chen, 1981)

Synonyms
- Charnia dengyingensis Ding and Chen, 1981

Extinct genus of Ediacaran lifeform

Paracharnia is an extinct genus of frond-like organism from the Ediacaran period in China. It is monospecific, consisting of a single species, Paracharnia dengyingensis. It was originally interpreted as a sea pen in the phylum Cnidaria, but is now classified as a member of the Rangeomorpha. It is known from a single fossil taken from the Shibantan Member, Dengying Formation, Sinian System in the Eastern Yangtze Gorge of Hubei Province. It was initially classified as Charnia dengyingensis, but Sun Weiguo in 1986, comparing this to findings from Charnwood in England and the Ediacara assemblage of South Australia, identified it as a new genus. It is closely associated with macroscopic algal remains of Vendotaenia and dense Cambrian shelly fossil deposits, suggesting its paleontological relevance.

The original fossil extraction from Ding and Chen (1981) is notable for its distinction from the original Charnia from Ford (1958) due to the arrangement of each of its polyp leaves and the length of the peduncle. Each polyp leaf in the 1981 recovery is smaller and further out on the stem.
