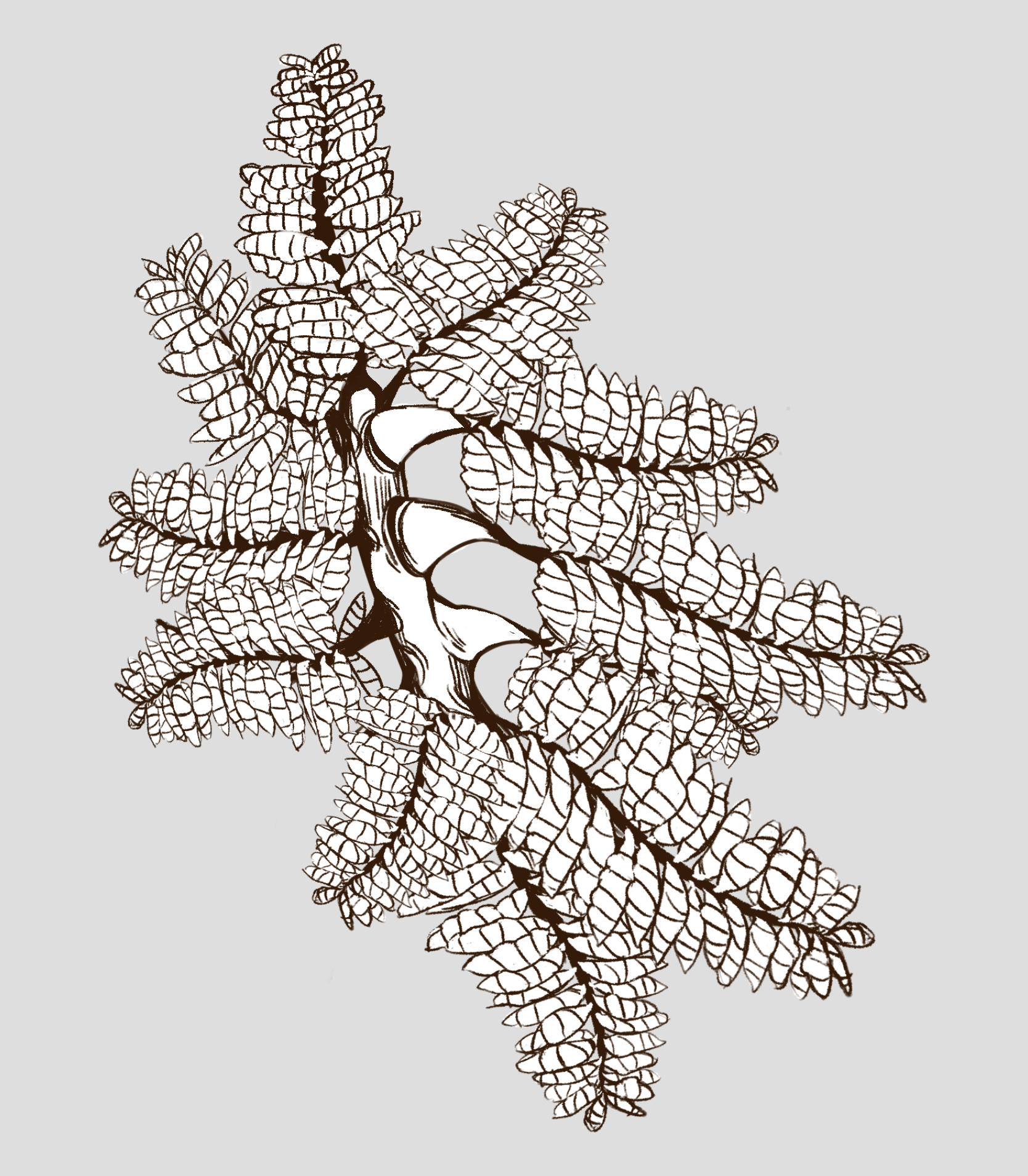
- Paleoart by Max Endieveri modeled after Bamforth & Narbonne

Scientific classification
- Kingdom: Animalia
- Phylum: †Petalonamae
- Clade: †Rangeomorpha
- Genus: †Hapsidophyllas; Bamforth and Narbonne, 2009
- Species: †H. flexibilis

Binomial name
- †Hapsidophyllas flexibilis Bamforth and Narbonne, 2009

= Hapsidophyllas =

Hapsidophyllas Temporal range: late Ediacaran ~579–565 Ma

Genus of fossil rangeomorphs

Hapsidophyllas is a rare Ediacaran rangeomorph fossil found at Mistaken Point, Newfoundland, Canada. It was first identified by Emily Bamforth and Guy Narbonne in 2009. Because its characteristic flexible leaflet structure is dissimilar to other known rangeomorphs, Bamforth and Narbonne describe it as a new rangeomorph form, called hapsidophyllid. The only other known hapsidophyllid is the Ediacaran frond Frondophyllas grandis, which shares the network-like configuration of leaflets seen in Hapsidophyllas. Currently, the Hapsidophyllas flexibilis holotype resides in its type locality in the Mistaken Point Ecological Reserve, and a cast of the specimen is on display at the Royal Ontario Museum in Toronto, Canada.

== Etymology ==
The generic name roughly translates to 'A network of leaves', from the Greek words hapsis, to mean 'network' or 'mesh', and phyllon, to mean 'leaves'.

== Description ==
The Hapsidophyllas flexibilis holotype is 110 mm long and 4 mm wide. It is composed of multibranched leaflets radiating from a single elongate basal rod. The leaflets gradually taper toward their distal ends and overlap one another. This leaf shape points towards a suspension feeding behavior. The overlapping branches of Hapsidophyllas are architecturally similar to the renowned Ediacaran frond Charnia. However, a significant difference between the two is that the primary branches of Charnia are connected to a central tube that is absent or internal, while hapsidophyllid leaflets are attached to a visible stalk.

== Paleoecology ==
Sedimentary studies show that Mistaken Point organisms, including Hapsidophyllas, lived on the deep seafloor below the photic zone. Because Mistaken Point organisms were preserved under deposit layers of volcanic ash, their proximity to the seafloor can be estimated based on the quality of their preservation. Due to its excellent preservation, it is estimated that the Hapsidophyllas flexibilis laid semi-prone to the seafloor in its life.
