= Bay du Nord series =

- Stratigraphic range: Devonian
- Type: Formation

Location
- Region: Newfoundland and Labrador
- Country: Canada

The Bay du Nord series is a geologic formation in Newfoundland and Labrador. It preserves fossils dating back to the Devonian period.

== See also ==
- List of fossiliferous stratigraphic units in Newfoundland and Labrador
