= Long Point Group =

Geologic group in Canada

- Stratigraphic range: Ediacaran
- Type: Group

Location
- Region: Newfoundland and Labrador
- Country: Canada

The Long Point Group is a geologic group in Newfoundland and Labrador. It preserves fossils dating back to the Ediacaran period.

== See also ==
- List of fossiliferous stratigraphic units in Newfoundland and Labrador
