= Attenborough's Journey =

- Directed by: David Lee
- Presented by: David Attenborough
- Country of origin: United Kingdom

Production
- Producer: Anthony Geffen

Original release
- Network: BBC
- Release: 2010

Attenborough's Journey is a 2010 British documentary on David Attenborough's career as a broadcaster and the production of the nature documentary series First Life. The documentary is presented by David Attenborough, and was made as a prelude to First Life.

== Reception ==
Tim Dowling, of The Guardian, praised the documentary, writing that it showed the "remarkable extent to which Attenborough is, behind the scenes, all one might have hoped: charming, funny, engaging, uncomplaining, extraordinarily well-informed and pleasant without being too nice."
