= First Life (TV series) =

- Genre: Documentary
- Narrated by: David Attenborough
- Country of origin: United Kingdom
- Original language: English
- No. of episodes: 2

Production
- Running time: 60 minutes

Original release
- Release: 5 November – 12 November 2010

First Life is a 2010 British nature documentary series written and presented by David Attenborough, also known by the expanded titles David Attenborough's First Life (UK) and First Life with David Attenborough (USA). It was first broadcast in the US as a two-hour special on the Discovery Channel on 24 October 2010. In the United Kingdom it was broadcast as a two-part series on BBC Two on 5 November 2010. First Life sees Attenborough tackle the subject of the origin of life on Earth. He investigates the evidence from the earliest fossils, which suggest that complex animals first appeared in the oceans around 540 million years ago, an event known as the Cambrian Explosion. Trace fossils of multicellular organisms from an even earlier period, the Ediacaran biota, are also examined. Attenborough travels to Canada, Morocco and Australia, using some of the latest fossil discoveries and their nearest equivalents amongst living species to reveal what life may have been like at that time. Visual effects and computer animation are used to reconstruct and animate the extinct life forms. Attenborough's Journey, a documentary film profiling the presenter as he journeyed around the globe filming First Life, was shown on BBC Two on 24 October 2010. A hardback book to accompany the series, authored by Matt Kaplan with a foreword by Attenborough, was published in September 2010.

== Production ==
The series was directed by freelance film-maker Martin Williams and series produced by Anthony Geffen, CEO and Executive Producer of Atlantic Productions, with whom Attenborough has collaborated on a number of 3D documentaries for the satellite broadcaster Sky. It was produced in association with the BBC, the Discovery Channel and the Australian Broadcasting Corporation. During production, it had the working title The First Animals.

== Reception ==
At the News & Documentary Emmy Awards in 2011, First Life won in all three categories it was nominated in, for writing, graphic design and art direction and nature programming. The series was nominated for its photography and editing at the BAFTA Craft Awards earlier the same year.

== Episodes ==
| No. | Title | Original release date |
|---|---|---|
| 1 | "Arrival" | 5 November 2010 |
The first ancient living being mentioned in the episode is Charnia, an Ediacaran lifeform whose fossil was first found in Charnwood Forest. Stromatolites, which still live in Western Australia are also shown. With the palaeontologist Dr Guy Narbonne, Attenborough visits Mistaken Point where there are hundreds of fossils of Charnia and other animals of which the most common is Fractofusus (thousands of specimens). In the Ediacara Hills Attenborough is shown by palaeontologist Dr Jim Gehling fossils of Dickinsonia. In the same place there are also fossils of Kimberella, a slug-like animal and Spriggina. These animals are the first to have been mobile and have bilateral symmetry, Spriggina being the first to clearly have a head and a tail. In the same hills palaeontologist Dr Mary Droser shows Funisia the first animal for which there is evidence of sexual reproduction. In Switzerland Attenborough visits a very large synchrotron which is used by Professor Philip Donoghue to take microscopic 3-dimensional pictures of the interior of fossilized embryos, including Markuelia an animal which lived 20 million years after the animals of Ediacara and one of the first to have a gut. Charnwood Forest fossils Charnia Mistaken Point fossils Charnia Pizza disks Fractofusus Ediacara Hills fossils Dickinsonia Kimberella Spriggina Funisia Southern China fossils Markuelia
| 2 | "Conquest" | 12 November 2010 |
One of the first big predators was Anomalocaris, found in the Burgess Shale in the Canadian Rockies. Its prey probably included animals such as Opabinia, Wiwaxia, Hallucigenia. Professor Justin Marshall shows mantis shrimp, which are similar to Anomalocaris. One of the most successful arthropod groups were the Trilobites. Some of the biggest were the Eurypterids, or sea scorpions, such as Pterygotus, of which a large fossil exists in the vaults of the National Museum of Scotland in Edinburgh. Aysheaia is thought to be the ancestor of the first land animal. A very similar land animal, the velvet worm, still lives in the tropics including the rainforest in Queensland, Australia. The oldest known fossil of an air-breathing arthropod is the 428 million-year-old Pneumodesmus, a millipede. Burgess Shale fossils Opabinia Wiwaxia Hallucigenia Anomalocaris Ammonites Trilobites Aysheaia Pikaia Morocco fossils Trilobites Scotland fossils Eurypterids Pneumodesmus (identified as land arthropod) Unnamed relative of horsetail Arthropleura Meganeura

== David Attenborough's Rise of Animals: Triumph of the Vertebrates ==
In December 2011, a second series of First Life was announced by media website Realscreen. The new series focused on the evolution of the earliest fish, reptiles, amphibians and mammals, and aired on the BBC in 2013, as David Attenborough's Rise of Animals: Triumph of the Vertebrates.
