= Labrador Group =

Geologic group in Canada

- Stratigraphic range: Cambrian
- Type: Group

Location
- Region: Newfoundland and Labrador
- Country: Canada

The Labrador Group is a geologic group in Newfoundland and Labrador. It preserves fossils dating back to the Cambrian period.

== See also ==
- List of fossiliferous stratigraphic units in Newfoundland and Labrador
