= Big Cove Formation =

Geologic formation in Newfoundland and Labrador, Canada

- Stratigraphic range: Carboniferous
- Type: Formation

Location
- Region: Newfoundland and Labrador
- Country: Canada

The Big Cove Formation is a geologic formation in Newfoundland and Labrador. It preserves fossils dating back to the Carboniferous period.

== See also ==
- List of fossiliferous stratigraphic units in Newfoundland and Labrador
