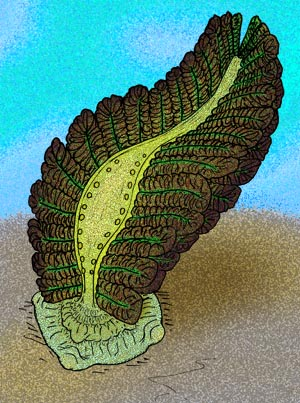
- Reconstruction of Bomakellia kelleri based on Dzik J's interpretation

Scientific classification
- Kingdom: Animalia
- Phylum: †Petalonamae
- Clade: †Rangeomorpha
- Family: †Charniidae
- Genus: †Bomakellia; Fedonkin, 1985
- Species: †B. kelleri

Binomial name
- †Bomakellia kelleri Fedonkin, 1985

= Bomakellia =

Bomakellia Temporal range: late Ediacaran 555 Ma

Ediacaran fossil organism

Bomakellia is an extinct monospecific genus of petalonamid from the Late Ediacaran. They are estimated to have lived around 555 million years ago, and has only been found in the Ustʹ Pinega Formation in Arkhangelsk Region, Russia. Originally described as a primitive arthropod-like creature, more recent studies have seen it placed within the phylum Petalonamae. Bomakellia kelleri is the only species.

== Discovery ==
The holotype, and only, fossil of Bomakellia was found in the Syuzma River of the Ustʹ Pinega Formation, in the Arkhangelsk Region, Russia, and described in 1985.

== Description ==
Bomakellia kelleri has a frond-like shape, growing up to 9 cm (3.5 in) in height. Despite there only being a single fossil, it still preserves enough to show that Bomakellia was a small frond with a tetraradial symmetry, bearing similarities with Rangea, another rangeomorph petalonamid.

== Affinities ==
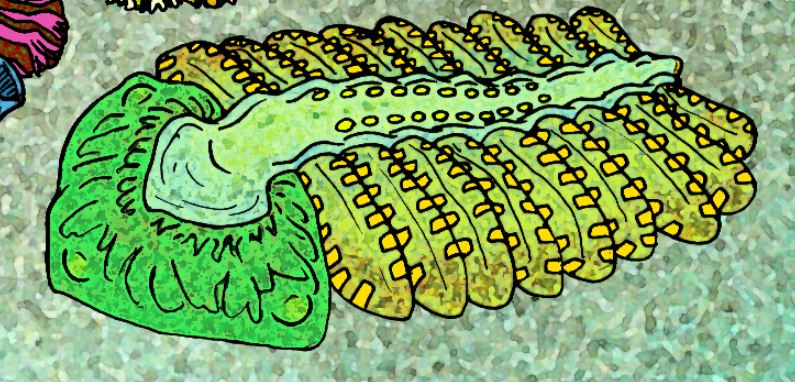
An outdated reconstruction of Bomakellia kelleri as a proto-arthropod, based on B. M. Waggoner's interpretation

When originally described in 1985, Bomakellia was interpreted to be a form of early arthropod, with a study by B. M. Waggoner concluding that the organism was a primitive anomalocarid and erroneously identifying the ridges of its supposed cephalon as eyes, which would have made Bomakellia the oldest known animal with vision. However, this interpretation has not been widely accepted, and in some cases not acknowledged.

More recent studies have placed Bomakellia within the family Charniidae, which itself is a part of the clade Rangeomorpha, and phylum Petalonamae, based on a better re-description of the singular fossil.

== See also ==
- List of Ediacaran genera
- Charniidae
