= Conception Group =

Geologic group in Newfoundland and Labrador, Canada

- Stratigraphic range: 600–565 Ma (approx.)
- Type: Group
- Sub-units: Mistaken Point Formation; Murphy's Cove Member; Goodland Point Member; Briscal Formation (in south Avalon only); Drook Formation; contains a number of members and a gabbro intrusion; Gaskiers Formation (in south/central Avalon only); Mall Bay Formation (in south Avalon only)
- Underlies: St. John's Group
- Overlies: Harbour Main Group (unconformably?); Holyrood Intrusive Suite

Location
- Region: Newfoundland and Labrador
- Country: Canada
- Bedrock occurrence of the Conception Group on the Avalon Peninsula, Newfoundland

The Conception Group is a geologic group in Newfoundland and Labrador. It preserves fossils dating back to the Ediacaran period. It mainly contains turbidites, but is interrupted by a glacial diamictite, and tops out with sand and siltstones (these dated to 565 Ma). It corresponds to the lower portion of the Connecting Point Group.

In some areas the Drook Formation continues from the base of the group to the base of the Mistaken Point Formation; elsewhere (in central / south Avalon) the Briscal, Gaskiers and Mall Bay Formations wedge in.

== See also ==
- List of fossiliferous stratigraphic units in Newfoundland and Labrador
