= St. George Group =

Geologic group in Canada

- Stratigraphic range: Ordovician
- Type: Group

Location
- Region: Newfoundland and Labrador
- Country: Canada

The St. George Group is a geologic group in Newfoundland and Labrador. It preserves fossils dating back to the Ordovician period.

== See also ==
- List of fossiliferous stratigraphic units in Newfoundland and Labrador
