= Middle Arm Point Formation =

Rock formation in Newfoundland, Canada

The Middle Arm Point Formation is a Tremadocian formation cropping out in Western Newfoundland, containing arthropod embryos preserved in the Orsten fashion.
