= Shiva Balak Misra =

Indian geologist and rural education reformer

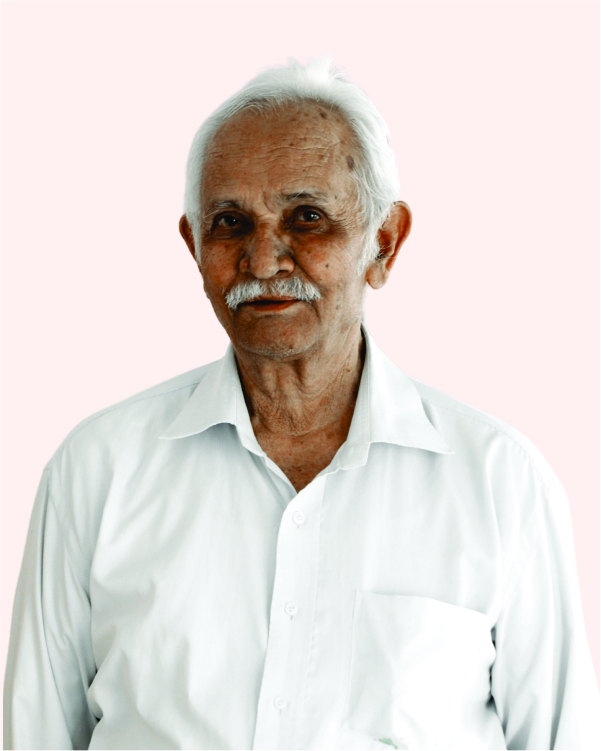
- Dr. Shiva Balak Misra, geologist and educator
- Born: 1 March 1940 (age 86); Barabanki, United Provinces, British India
- Education: University of Lucknow; Memorial University of Newfoundland
- Known for: Discovery of Fractofusus misrai Founding Bharatiya Gramin Vidyalaya
- Spouse: Nirmala Misra (d. 2023)
- Children: Neelesh Misra; Shailesh Misra
- Awards: Apeejay India Volunteer Award (2011); Laadli Media Award (2014); Kalinga Literary Festival Award (2025); Times Now Amazing Indian Award (2025)
- Scientific career
- Fields: Geology; Education; Social reform
- Institutions: Kumaun University; Bharatiya Gramin Vidyalaya
- Thesis: Geology of Biscay Bay-Cape Race area, Avalon Peninsula, Newfoundland (1969)
- Website: www.sbmisra.in

Shiva Balak Misra (born 1 March 1940) is an Indian geologist, educator, and rural reformer best known for discovering Fractofusus misrai, one of the world’s oldest known multicellular life forms, at Mistaken Point, Newfoundland, Canada. He later returned to India, where he founded Bharatiya Gramin Vidyalaya, a pioneering rural school near Lucknow, and became an influential figure in grassroots education and community development.

== Early life and education ==
Misra was born in Karua village, Barabanki, United Provinces (now Uttar Pradesh), to Balbhadra Prasad Misra. As a child, he walked 12 km each day to the nearest school, an experience that shaped his lifelong mission to establish educational opportunities in rural India.

He completed his M.Sc. in Geology from the University of Lucknow, and later earned an M.S. in Geology from the Memorial University of Newfoundland, Canada, on a research scholarship. Misra’s thesis, completed in 1969, mapped and described the Avalon Peninsula, where he made his fossil discovery.

== Scientific career ==
=== Fossil discovery at Mistaken Point ===
In 1967, while conducting field research at Mistaken Point, Newfoundland, Misra discovered fossil imprints of soft-bodied organisms dating back 565 million years. These fossils, later named Fractofusus misrai in his honor (2007), provided the earliest credible evidence of multicellular life on Earth.

His findings were published in Nature (1968, 1969) and the Bulletin of the Geological Society of America (1969), and continue to be cited in evolutionary biology and paleontology.

The discovery site was declared the Mistaken Point Ecological Reserve in 1984 and recognized as a UNESCO World Heritage Site in 2016.

=== Geological contributions in India ===
Upon returning to India, Misra worked with the Geological Survey of India and later as Professor of Geology at Kumaun University (1978–1998), where he also served as Dean of the Faculty of Science (1992).

His research on the Precambrian Krol Group of the Nainital region advanced knowledge of stromatolites, depositional environments, and microbial life of the early biosphere. He also discovered copper ore occurrences in Madhya Pradesh, contributing significantly to India’s mineral exploration database.

== Educational and social work ==
In 1972, Misra and his wife, Nirmala Misra, founded Bharatiya Gramin Vidyalaya (BGV) in Kunaura, Lucknow district, using their personal land and resources. Starting as a thatched hut, the school grew into a model of holistic rural education, integrating academic learning with vocational training, women’s empowerment, and digital readiness.

BGV initiatives include:

- Dairy training and micro-entrepreneurship for rural families
- Tailoring and livelihood programs for women
- Digital classrooms and global mentorship
- Hospitality training in partnership with IIHM, enabling students to secure jobs in Marriott and other hotel chains

The school has educated thousands of first-generation learners, particularly girls and children from marginalized communities, and produced alumni working as teachers, engineers, and civil servants.

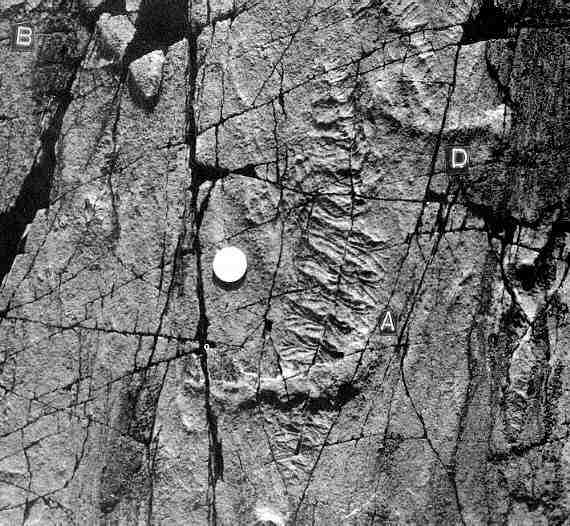
Fractofusus Misrai 565mn years old fossils first documened by Shiva Balak Misra

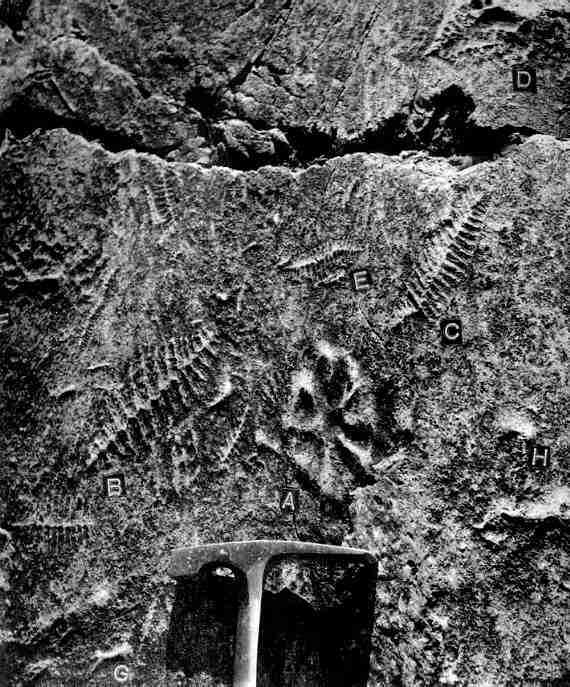
Round Lobate Form fossils discovered at Mistaken Point Newfoundland by Shiva Balak Misra Source: MS Thesis

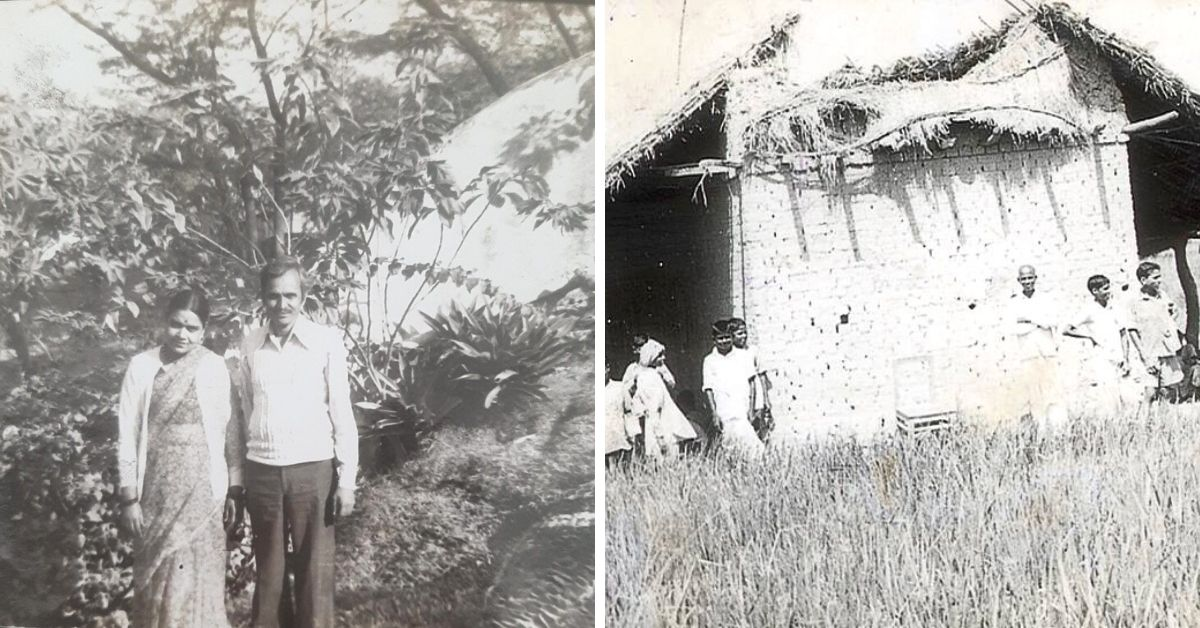
Bharatiya Gramin Vidyalaya in its founding years (thatched hut structure), established by Dr. Shiva Balak Misra and Nirmala Misra in Kunaura village, Lucknow district, India, 1972.

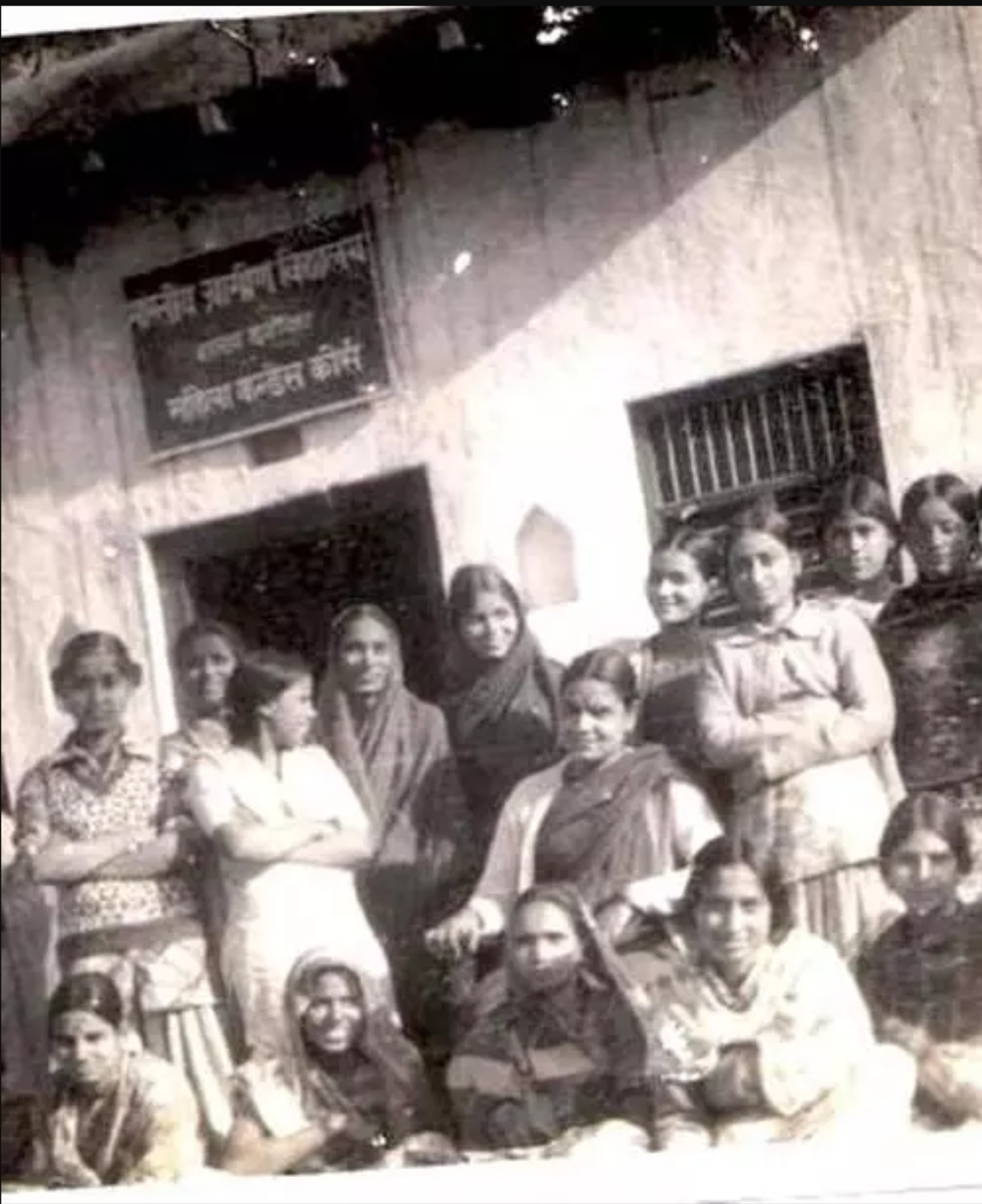
Nirmala Misra with students at during its early years in the 1970s at the Itaunja Training Center of Bharatiya Gramin Vidyalaya, Lucknow District, India.

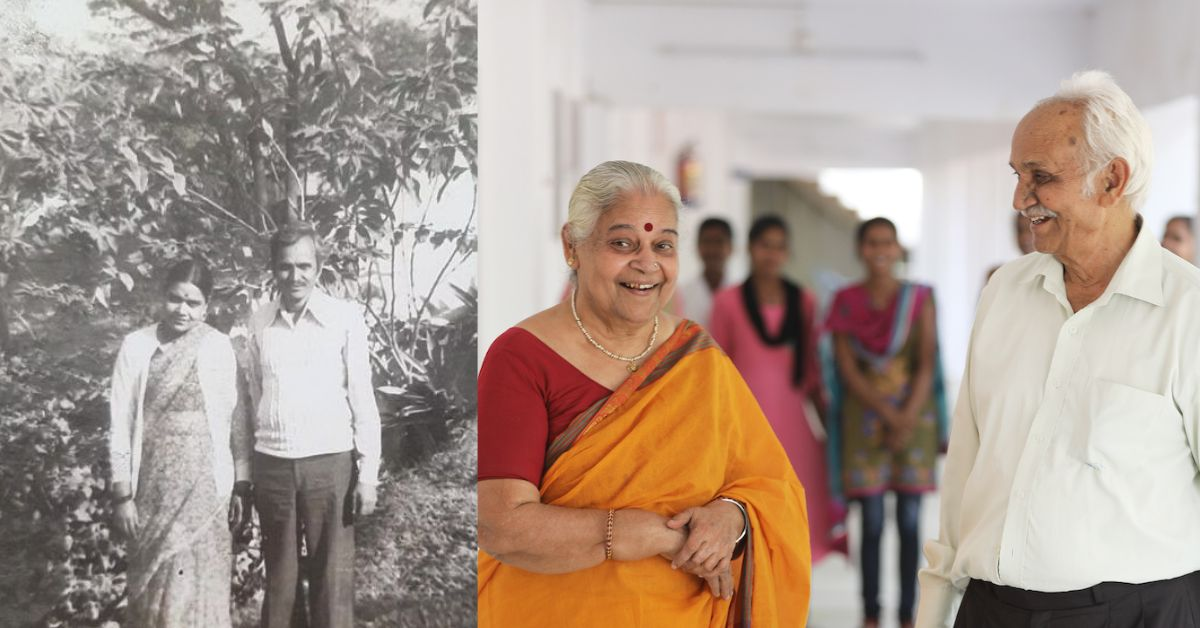
Shiva Balak Misra and Nirmala Misra, co-founders of BGV

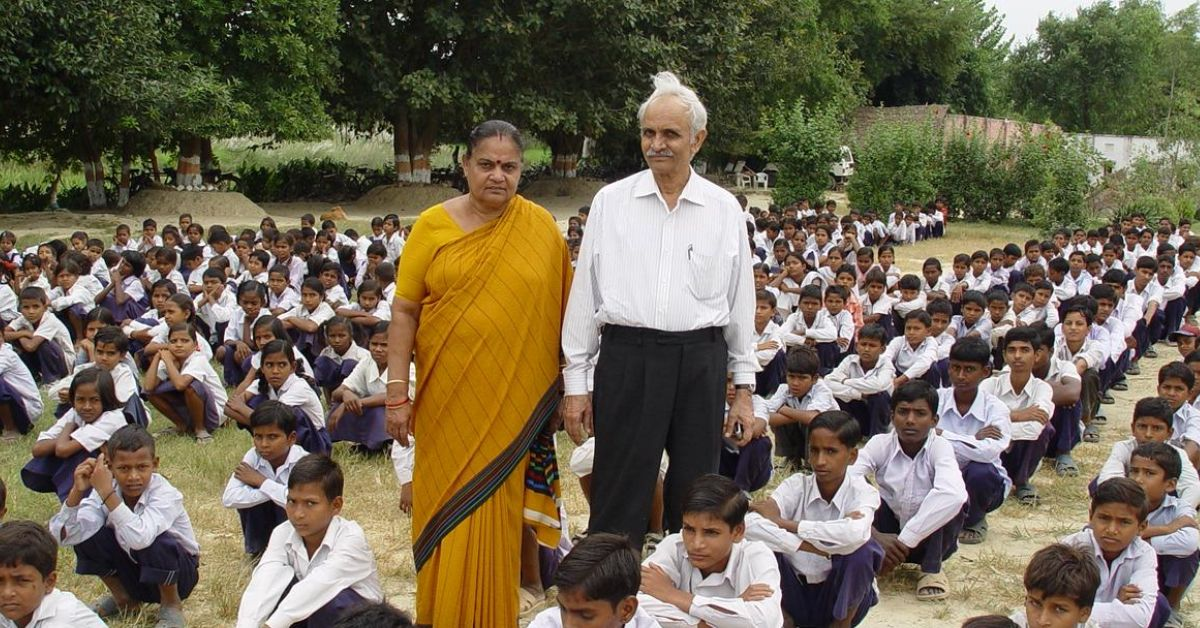
Dr. Misra at Bharatiya Gramin Vidyalaya, 2020s

== Positions held ==
=== Academic ===
- Professor of Geology, Kumaun University (1978–1998)
- Dean, Faculty of Science, Kumaun University (1992)
- Head, Dept. of Geology, Kanyakubj College, Lucknow (1965–1966)
- Research roles at ONGC, Radex Minerals (Toronto), Carleton University (Ottawa), and Govt. of Newfoundland

=== Social & educational leadership ===
- Pradesh Adhyaksh, Akhil Bharatiya Vidyarthi Parishad (ABVP), Meerut Pradesh (1989–1991)
- Joint Director, Bharatiya Shiksha Shodh Sansthan, Lucknow (1998–2000)
- Co-founder & Manager, Bharatiya Gramin Vidyalaya (1972–present)
- General Secretary, Friends of India Association, Newfoundland, Canada

== Publications ==
=== Books ===
- Bharatiyata aur Paryavaran (भारतीयता और पर्यावरण)
- Dream Chasing: One Man’s Remarkable, True Life Story – Autobiography
- Gaon se Bees Postcard – Essays on rural life and education

=== Selected research papers ===
- Misra, S.B. (1968). "Fossils found in pre-Cambrian Conception Group of Southeastern Newfoundland." Nature, 220(5168), 680–681.
- Misra, S.B. (1969). "Late Precambrian(?) fossils from southeastern Newfoundland." Geol. Soc. America Bull., 80: 2133–2140.
- Misra, S.B. (1983). "Lithostratigraphy and stromatolites of the Krol Group." Central Advanced Studies in Geology.
- Misra, S.B. (1984). "Depositional environment of the Krol Group." Proc. Indian Academy of Sciences (Earth & Planetary Sciences).
- Misra, S.B. (1969). Geology of Biscay Bay-Cape Race area, Avalon Peninsula, Newfoundland. M.S. thesis, Memorial University of Newfoundland. Full text online

== Awards and honours ==
- Fossil species Fractofusus misrai named in his honor (2007)
- Apeejay India Volunteer Award (2011)
- Laadli Media Award for Gender Sensitivity (2014)
- Kalinga Literary Festival Award for Gaon se Bees Postcard (2025)
- Times Now Amazing Indian Award for Education & Skill Development (2025)

== Legacy ==
Misra’s life bridges two worlds — the scientific frontier of paleontology and the grassroots struggle for rural education. His discovery at Mistaken Point changed global understanding of early life, while Bharatiya Gramin Vidyalaya continues to affect generations of rural children.

He currently lives at Bharatiya Gramin Vidyalaya, the school he founded in Lucknow. His eldest son is journalist and storyteller Neelesh Misra, while his younger son Shailesh Misra is a software professional.
