= Gaskiers Formation =

Geologic formation in Canada

- Stratigraphic range: Ediacaran 580.90–579.88 Ma
- Type: Formation
- Unit of: Conception Group
- Sub-units: South Point Member
- Underlies: Drook Formation
- Overlies: Mall Bay Formation
- Thickness: 300 m (984 ft)

Lithology
- Primary: Red Agglomerate
- Other: Tillite, Mudstone

Location
- Region: Newfoundland and Labrador
- Country: Canada

Type section
- Named for: Gaskiers-Point La Haye

The Gaskiers Formation is a geologic formation in Newfoundland and Labrador, and takes its named from the wider Gaskiers-Point La Haye area.

The Gaskiers-Point La Haye/Gaskiers Formation gets its name to the Gaskiers glaciation, a glacial event that was around during a majority or short period of the formations range, with recent evidence suggesting that the event actually started a lot earlier than was previously thought in the underlying Mall Bay Formation.
