= Beothukis =

Beothukis Temporal range: Late Ediacaran ~570–550.78 Ma

Scientific classification
- Kingdom: Animalia
- Phylum: †Petalonamae
- Clade: †Rangeomorpha
- Genus: †Beothukis; Brasier and Antcliffe, 2009

Type species
- B. mistakensis Brasier and Antcliffe, 2009

Species
- B. mistakensis Brasier and Antcliffe, 2009; B. plumosa (Laflamme et al., 2012)

Synonyms
- Culmofrons Laflamme et al., 2012

Rare fossil frond-like rangeomorph

Beothukis is a rare fossil frond-like member of the Rangeomorpha, described from the Ediacaran of Mistaken Point, Newfoundland. It had been identified since 1992, referred in papers as a "spatulate frond" or "flat recliner", but not formally described until 2009. The original fossils from which the genus has been described are still in situ, but replicas are preserved at the Memorial University of Newfoundland and at the Oxford University Museum of Natural History. Claims of a stem have been contentious, and based largely on structures that have subsequently been determined to be erosional scours, and is so considered to be a recliner.

== Morphology ==
Beothukis appears as a frond composed of two asymmetrical rows of branches that depart from a central growth axis, 12.5–15.5 cm long and 4.5–6 cm wide. Secondary growth is present around the tip. Secondary order units cross the primary order axes as is common in the Charnida The alternations are irregularly spaced.

Beothukis is considered morphologically intermediate between Trepassia (previously known as Charnia wardi) and Bradgatia.

== See also ==
- List of Ediacaran genera
