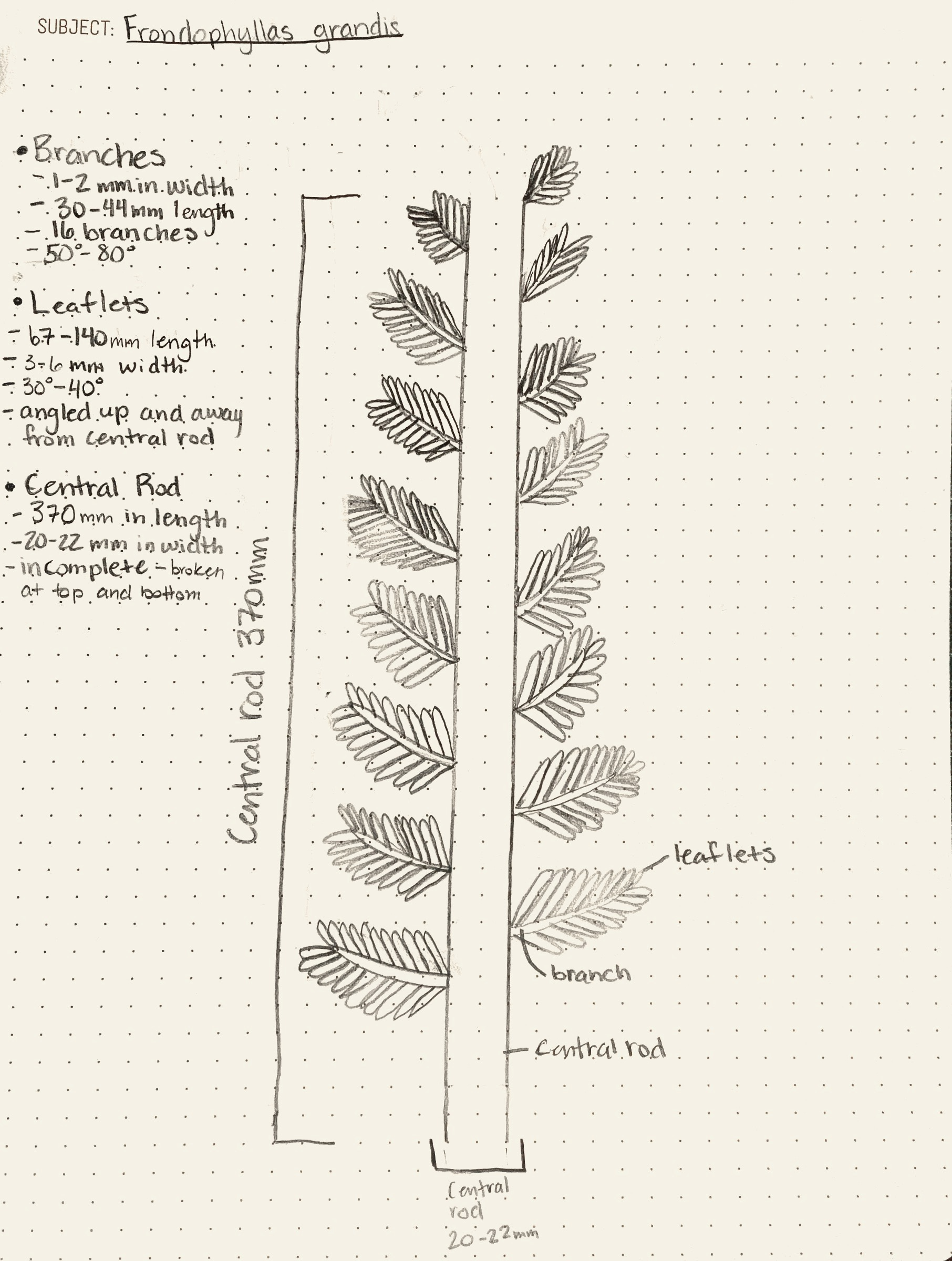
- A sketch of Frondophyllas published in the Journal of Paleontology by a student at Michigan State University.

Scientific classification
- Kingdom: Animalia
- Phylum: †Petalonamae
- Clade: †Rangeomorpha
- Genus: †Frondophyllas
- Species: †F. grandis

Binomial name
- †Frondophyllas grandis Bamforth & Narbonne, 2009

= Frondophyllas =

Frondophyllas Temporal range: 575–550 Ma

Rangeomorph

Frondophyllas is an extinct, monotypic animal genus in the clade Rangeomorpha. It was found at the Mistaken Point on the Avalon Peninsula in Newfoundland, Canada in 2008 by Bamforth and Anderson. The single species is Frondophyllas grandis and as of 2021 only two specimens have been discovered. Both specimens are incomplete, but one extends to one meter long, making it one of the largest Ediacaran macrofossils. The species name: grandis, comes from its size, and the genus name: Frondophyllas means "frond with leaves". The organism has a base structure with numerous fronds attached to it. It is the only Ediacaran organism to have distinct leaflets. Evidence suggests that F. grandis may have been tethered to the seafloor and used these leaflets to "filter feed", or live off nutrients provided by a current. One of the reasons fossils of this species are so rare is because it was a soft-bodied organism. It is believed that F. grandis was preserved because it was caught beneath quickly solidifying volcanic ash. Many of the Mistaken Point fossils were preserved this way.

== Morphology, anatomy, and behavior ==
The F. grandis has multibranching that differs from the other rangeomorphs that have been discovered. They have frond-like leaflets that are flexible that were able to be preserved in the fossilization process. They were benthic animals that lived in a deep-sea environment with other taxa that were found during this time. It was suggested that either they ate small organisms that would pass by or that they would filter feed. The fossil is the only Ediacaran fossil that is frond-like and has multiple leaf-bearing branches of its kind. It is also one of the longest fossils ever found during the Ediacaran period with a 1m long specimen found.

== Method of fossilization ==
The Frondophyllas, like many other fossils found in the Avalon Peninsula, was preserved by solidified volcanic ash. Within the silicified mudstone-volcanic ash, we can see the soft-bodied organisms being well preserved. Evidence suggests that during this preservation event, the volcanic ash created a mold of the organism when it fell onto the sea floor. Although well preserved, both fossils found were incomplete with a broken central rod.

== Distribution and paleoenvironment ==
Found in the Avalon Peninsula of Newfoundland, Canada, Frondophyllas grandis was discovered in the Briscal Formation in Bristy Cove. The depositional environment of Mistaken Point consists of silicified mudstones-volcanic ash at 575-560Ma. This environment had indications of having a deep-sea environment at the time that the F. grandis was alive, also indicating that it was a benthic animal.

Specimens were also found within the Inner Meadow site, dated to 550 million years ago, seeing Frondophyllas' range extended into the White Sea assemblage.
