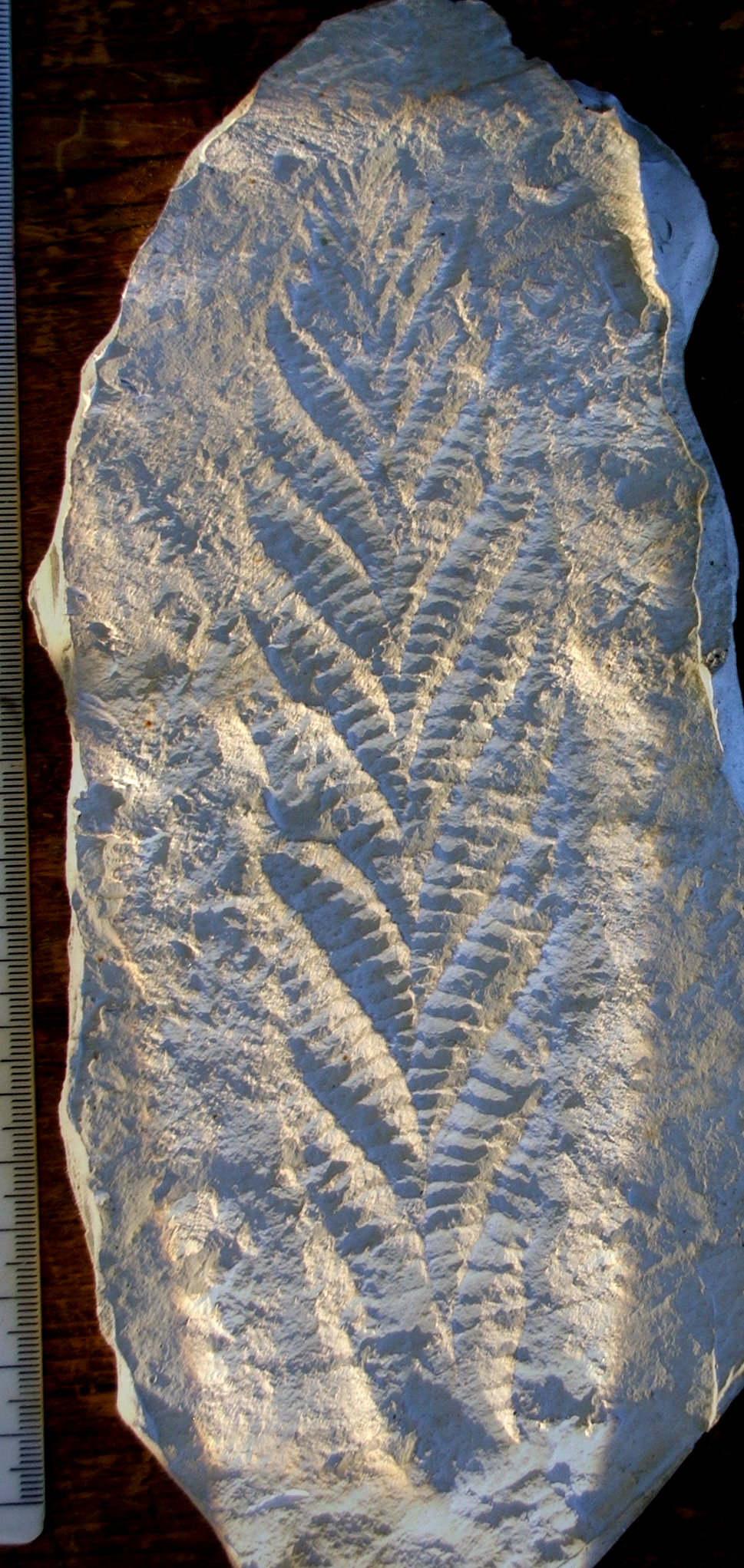
- Charnia masoni, a rangeomorph

Scientific classification
- Kingdom: Animalia
- Phylum: †Petalonamae
- Clade: †Rangeomorpha; Pflug, 1972

Subtaxa
- †Avalofractus; †Broccoliforma; †Fractofusus; †Frondophyllas; †Hapsidophyllas; †Hylaecullulus; †Pambikalbae; †Pectinifrons; †Plumeropriscum; †Primocandelabrum; †Trepassia; †Vinlandia; †Rangeidae; †Rangea; †Charniidae; †Aninoides; †Beothukis; †Bomakellia; †Bradgatia; †Charnia; †Paracharnia; †Culmofrons

Synonyms
- Charniomorpha

= Rangeomorph =

Rangeomorph Temporal range: 579–505 Ma Possibly one of the last representatives of the Ediacaran biota.

Taxon of frondose Ediacaran fossils

The rangeomorphs are a group of Ediacaran fossils. Ediacarans are the oldest large fossil organisms on earth, and many are not self-evidently related to anything else that has ever lived. However, some Ediacarans clearly resemble each other. Paleontologists have not been able to agree on what else, if anything, is related to these organisms, so Ediacarans are usually classified into groups based on their appearance. These "form taxa" allow scientists to study and discuss Ediacarans when they cannot know what kind of living things they were, or how they were genetically related to each other. Rangeomorphs look roughly like fern fronds or feathers arranged around a central axis; the group is defined as Ediacarans with a similar appearance and structure to the genus Rangea. Some researchers, such as Pflug and Narbonne, believe all rangeomorphs were more closely related to each other than to anything else. If true, this would make the group a natural taxon called Rangeomorpha (just as all insects are more closely related to each other than to any non-insects, and therefore are a natural taxon called Insecta).

Rangeomorphs are a key part of the Ediacaran biota, which survived for about 30 million years, until the base of the Cambrian, 538.8 million years ago. They were especially abundant in the cold, deep-ocean environments of the early Ediacaran, as shown in the Mistaken Point assemblage in Newfoundland.

== Body plan ==
Rangeomorphs are fractal and self-similar in form: they are made of branching sections, and each section repeats the same shape as the whole. The body "frond" is formed of branching "frond" elements, each a few centimetres long. Each of these is formed of many smaller "frondlets." Structurally, these are tubes held up by a semi-rigid organic skeleton. This body plan could have been formed using fairly simple developmental patterns.

== Ecology ==
Rangeomorphs dwelt in shallow to abyssal marine environments, were unable to move, and had no apparent reproductive organs. They may have reproduced asexually by dropping fronds. Since many lived below the lowest level of the ocean where sunlight can penetrate, they could not have survived by photosynthesis. There is no evidence of a gut or mouth. One hypothesis is that nutrients from seawater were concentrated in their bodies by osmosis. Among living organisms, only osmotrophic bacteria live in this way, but the fractal branching tube structure of rangeomorphs gave them an unusual amount of surface area for every unit of body volume. This structure may have made it possible for osmotrophic organisms to grow to large sizes. However, other researchers argue this way of life is implausible, and suggest filter feeding or other mechanisms.

Most rangeomorphs were attached to the sea floor by a stalk ending in a circular holdfast. Holdfasts were often torn from the frond by wave action or decay before fossilization, and are preserved as separate disc-shaped fossils that were given their own genus names (e.g. Aspidella). Other rangeomorphs (such as the spindle-shaped Fractofusus) lay flat on the sediment surface.

Though we do not know what rangeomorphs were, aspects of their lives are revealed by the fossil record. In some areas, numbers of fronds of the same genus are found together. Analysis suggests that the genus Fractofusus could reproduce in two ways, first by setting a particle of tissue loose in the ocean to land on the sea floor and develop into a new individual (a "grandparent"), and second, by "grandparents" spreading rapidly with stolons to form surrounding groups of smaller "parent" and "child" fronds, just as modern plants such as strawberries spread by runners.

Fossil assemblages from Newfoundland and the UK reveal that rangeomorphs could live in large groups. At least seven genera are associated with filaments or stolons up to four meters long. These filaments ran across or through the bacterial mats on which Ediacarans lived, connected with the holdfasts (or the center of the body in genera without holdfasts), and at least in some cases, connected individuals together. This evidence suggests rangeomorphs may have fed by absorbing nutrients from the bacterial mats, and might even have been colonial organisms (such as corals are today) rather than groups of unrelated individuals.

== Affinity ==
Rangeomorph communities are similar in structure to those of modern, suspension-feeding animals, but it is difficult to relate their morphology to any modern animals. Early researchers thought they were sea pens (Cnidaria), but examination of well-preserved specimens of Charnia reveals that the branching fronds of rangeomorphs were fundamentally different from sea pens in both anatomy and growth pattern, and the modern consensus is that they are unrelated. Rangeomorphs have at times been assigned to a range of modern animal and protist groups, but none of these classifications has withstood scrutiny; they probably represent an extinct stem group to either the animals or fungi. The fractal construction could be an adaptation to osmotic feeding that evolved independently in different groups, but most paleontologists now consider it to be a basic body characteristic inherited from a shared ancestor, which would mean the rangeomorphs are a natural taxon of organisms more closely related to each other than to anything else. The quilted construction suggests a close affinity to the erniettomorphs, another form taxon of Ediacarans whose bodies were made from sheets of many small tubes.

A 2021 analysis of the morphology and growth of Charnia concluded that rangeomorphs were early diverging eumetazoans that were not closely related to any living animal group.
