= Harbour Main Group =

Volcanic rock unit cropping out in Newfoundland

- Stratigraphic range: Neoproterozoic
- Occurrence of the Harbour Main Group in southeastern Newfoundland
- Type: Group

Location
- Region: Newfoundland and Labrador
- Country: Canada

The Harbour Main Group is a group of Neoproterozoic volcanic rocks cropping out in Newfoundland. Contains several distinct volcanic units lying beneath younger sedimentary rocks.
