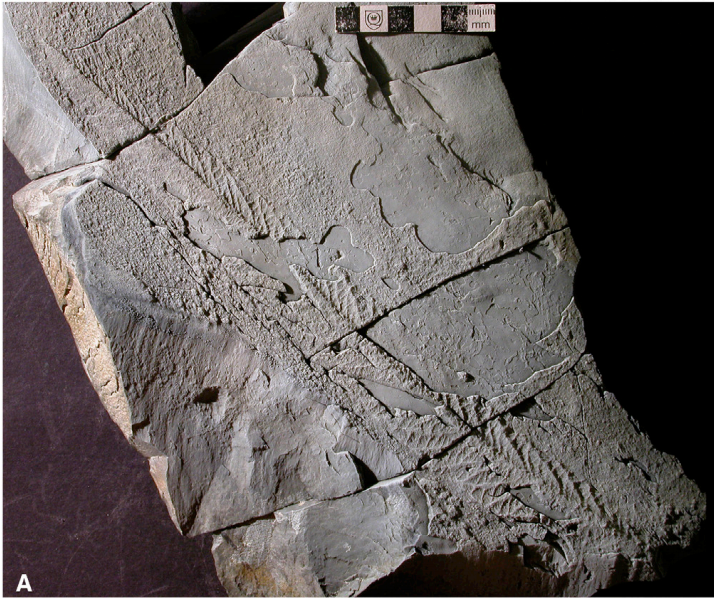
- A large specimen of Trepassia wardae from the Drooks Formation in Newfoundland

Scientific classification
- Kingdom: Animalia
- Phylum: †Petalonamae
- Clade: †Rangeomorpha
- Genus: †Trepassia; Narbonne, Laflamme, Greentree & Trusler, 2009
- Species: †T. wardae

Binomial name
- †Trepassia wardae (Narbonne and Gehling, 2003)

Synonyms
- Charnia wardi Narbonne and Gehling, 2003

= Trepassia =

Trepassia Temporal range: Late Ediacaran ~579–550.78 Ma

Extinct species of frondose organism

Trepassia is a 579-million-year-old fossil of Ediacaran rangeomorph. It was first discovered by Guy M. Narbonne, a professor at Queen's University in Ontario, Canada and colleagues in 2009. Three years later, Martin D. Brasier added additional description to Trepassia. The generic name is taken from the French word, trépassés, which translates to "those that have departed forever" (or "corpses") and honors the Trepassey community in Newfoundland. It was originally described as Charnia wardi.

== Morphology ==
Trepassia is one of the oldest known rangeomorphs and spanned over one meter in length. Longest specimens of T. wardae reached 185 cm (73 in). It is a long and slender rangeomorph, its structure consists of single-sided branches with both primary and secondary branches rising from a central stalk. The primary branches were capable of minor pivoting as shown in the bundles of secondary branches. The adult specimens of Trepassia had substantial thickness, shown by the cylindrical cross-section of the frond.

The suspension-feed strategy of Trepassia wardae was that it used its long, slender petalodium for continuous feeding at all heights above the sea floor. Trepassia is believed to have reproduced asexually. Taller organisms were surrounded by large clusters of offspring. It grew by addition of new branches at the tip of the frond. There may be a link between its mode of reproduction and its large body size.

== Distribution ==
Trepassia is found in Spaniard's Bay on the Avalon Peninsula of Newfoundland and in Mistaken Point Ecological Reserve in Newfoundland, Canada. It has also been found in the Inner Meadow site, which has been dated to 550 million years ago, extending the known age range of Trepassia into the White Sea assemblage.
