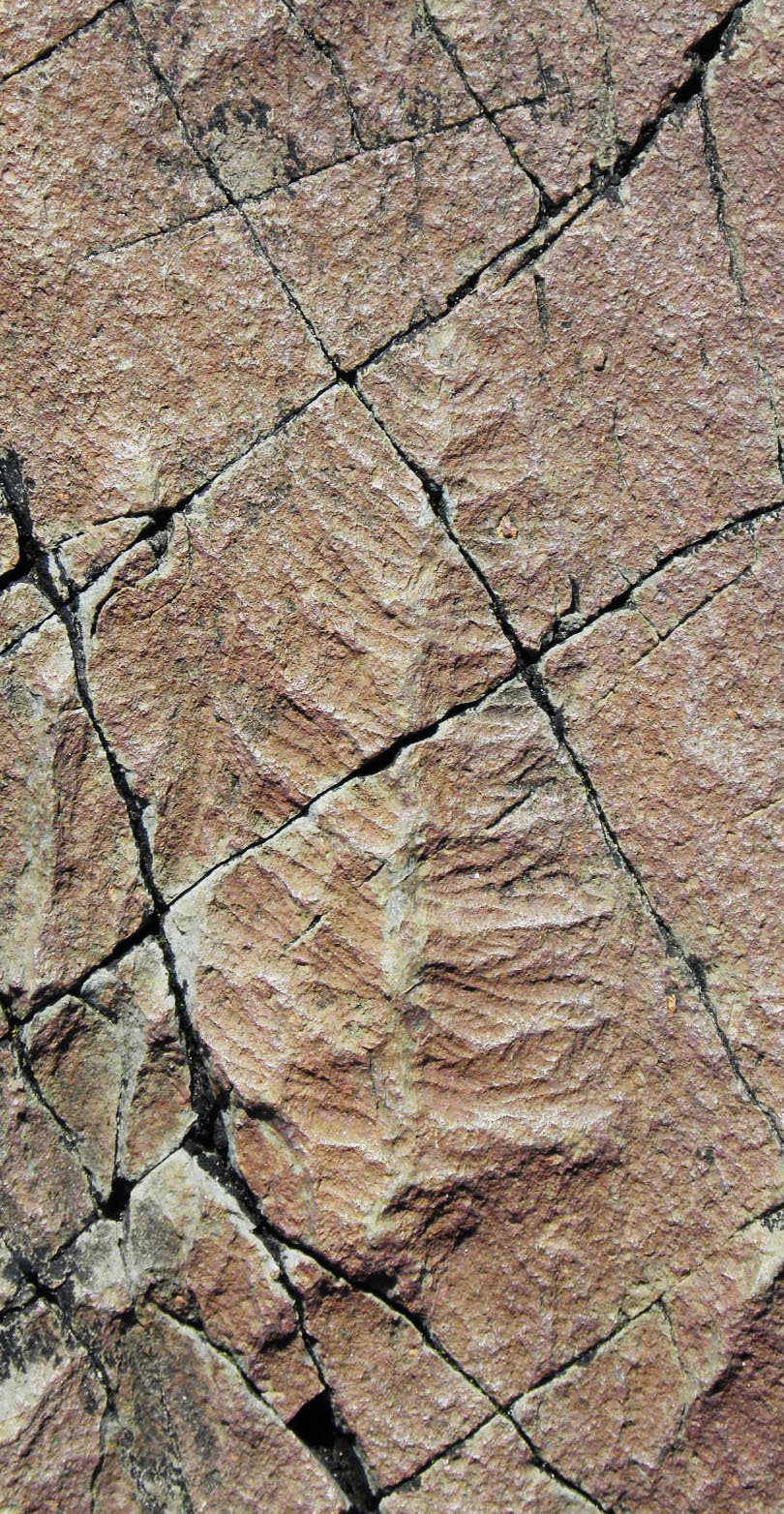
- Fractofusus misrai fossil in Newfoundland

Scientific classification
- Kingdom: Animalia
- Phylum: †Petalonamae
- Clade: †Rangeomorpha
- Genus: †Fractofusus; Gehling and Narbonne, 2007

Species
- Fractofusus andersoni Gehling and Narbonne, 2007; Fractofusus misrai Gehling and Narbonne, 2007

= Fractofusus =

Fractofusus Temporal range: 575–560 Ma

Frondose Ediacaran fossil

Fractofusus is one amongst many Ediacaran fossil discovered in 1967 by S.B. Misra at Mistaken Point, Newfoundland and Labrador, Canada, which has since become the Mistaken Point Ecological Reserve. and later declared a UNESCO World Heritage Site. Fractofusus misrai was named after Professor Misra in 2007. It represents a frondose rangeomorph, and its overall body plan shows glide reflection symmetry, which is typical of the clade. It is one of two described species in the genus Fractofusus, the other being Fractofusus andersoni. documented in Misra's MS Thesis along with early classification of Mistaken Point Fauna.

== Discovery ==
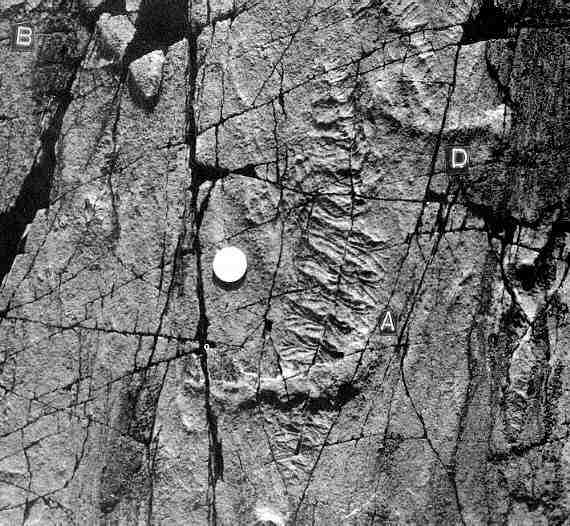
Spindle shaped organism with primary and secondary branches Photo: Shiva Balak Misra

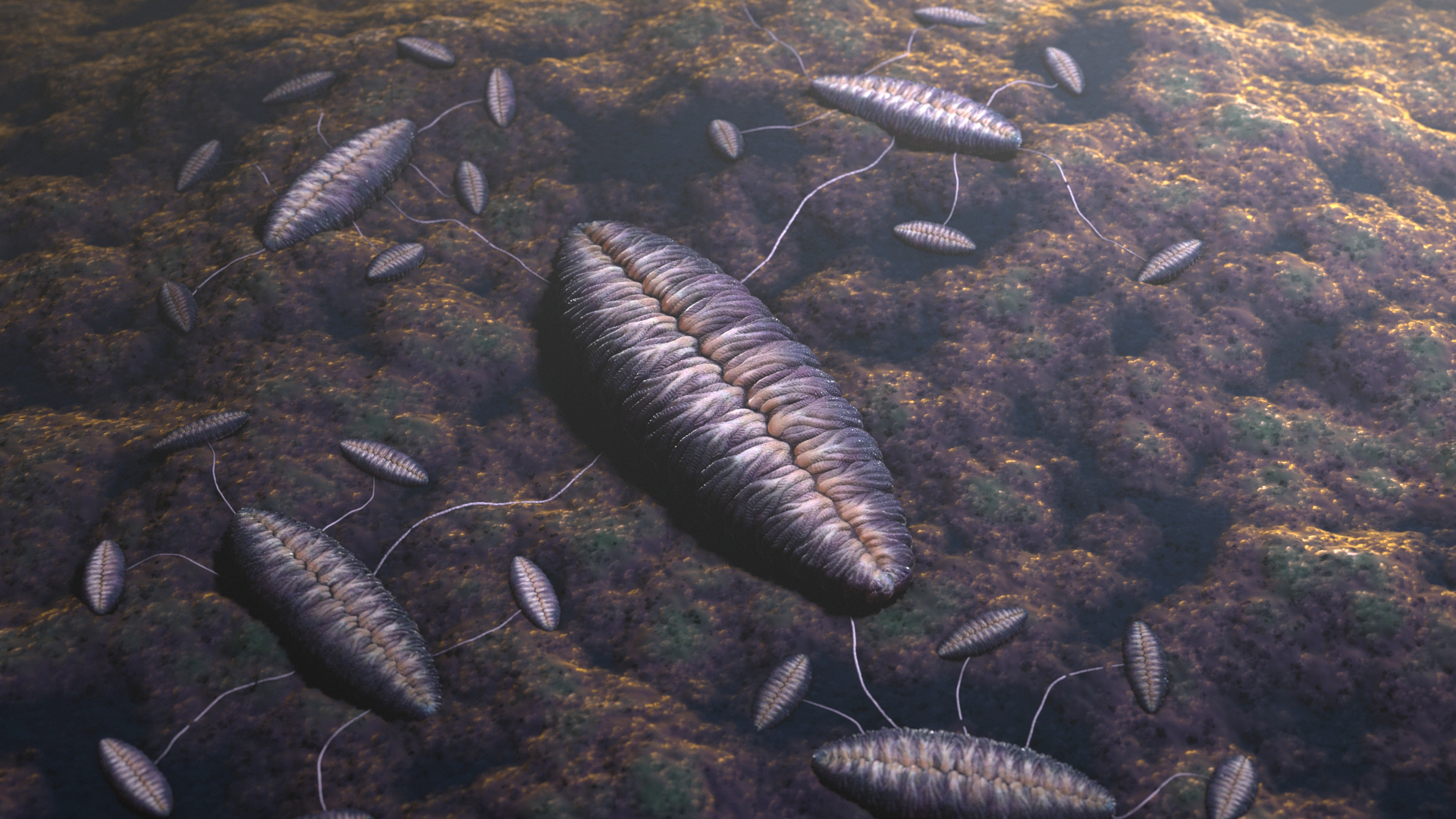
Artist's 3D reconstruction of Fractofusus misrai

In the summer of 1967, S.B. Misra, an Indian graduate student (1966–69) at Newfoundland's Memorial University discovered a rich assemblage of imprints of soft bodied organisms on the surface of large rock slabs, while mapping the Conception Group of Avalon Peninsula of Newfoundland near Cape Race, at a place called Mistaken Point.

These unusual impressions of previously unknown soft-bodied sea animals on the surfaces of argillites (mudstone) included coelenterates and other metazoa of the Ediacarian period, 575 to 560 million years ago. These fossils are records of some of the oldest known complex life forms that existed anywhere on Earth. Misra was the first to prepare and present a systematic geological map of the region, to classify and describe the rock sequence of the area and to work out the depositional history of the rocks.

The description of the fossil assemblage together with their mode of occurrence, the cause of sudden death, ecological conditions and chronological position form part of Misra's detailed thesis submitted for a degree of Master of Science. The discovery was reported in a 1968 letter to Nature. Misra described the Mistaken Point fauna in detail in 1969, in a paper published in the Bulletin of the Geological Society of America. He sorted the fossil assemblage into five groups, namely spindle-shaped, leaf-shaped, round lobate, dendrite like, and radiating. Each group was defined in terms of distribution and form, sub-categories and biological affinity.

The geological environment of the fossil-bearing rocks and the ecology of the animals that lived and died in the Conception Sea were described by Misra in two of his subsequent papers published in the Bulletin of the Geological Society of America in 1971 and in the Journal of the Geological Society of India in 1981. Mistaken Point Ecological Reserve is a 5.7-square kilometer area of the coast that protects the fossils.

== Reproductive strategy ==
The distribution pattern of Fractofusus suggests that it had an effective reproductive strategy. This appears to have consisted of sending out a waterborne propagule to a distant area, and then spreading rapidly from there, very likely asexually, just as plants today spread by stolons or runners.

== See also ==
- List of Ediacaran genera
