= Mistaken Point Ecological Reserve =

Protected area in Newfoundland, Canada

- IUCN category II (national park)
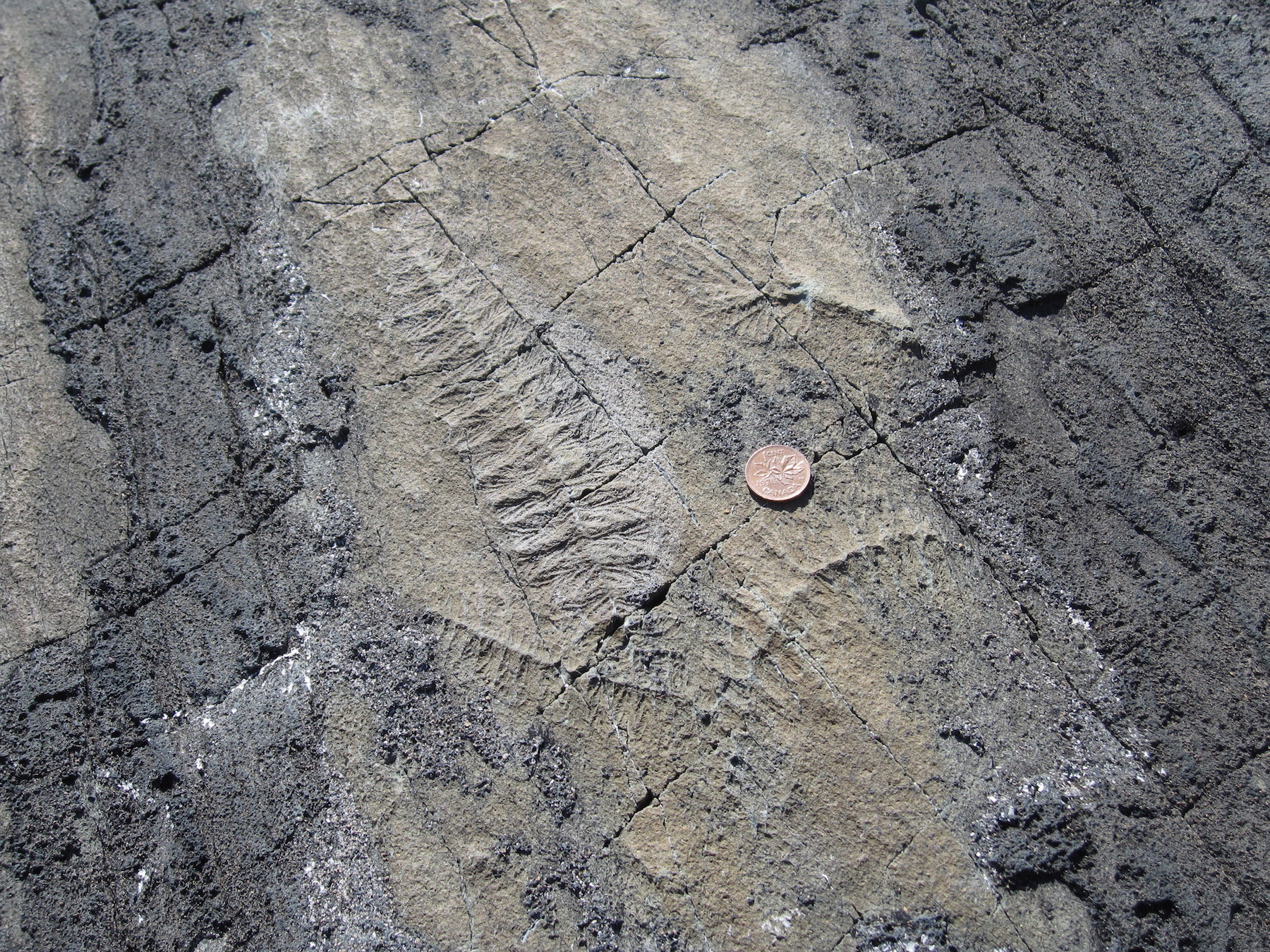
- Ediacaran fossils, with a penny for size comparison

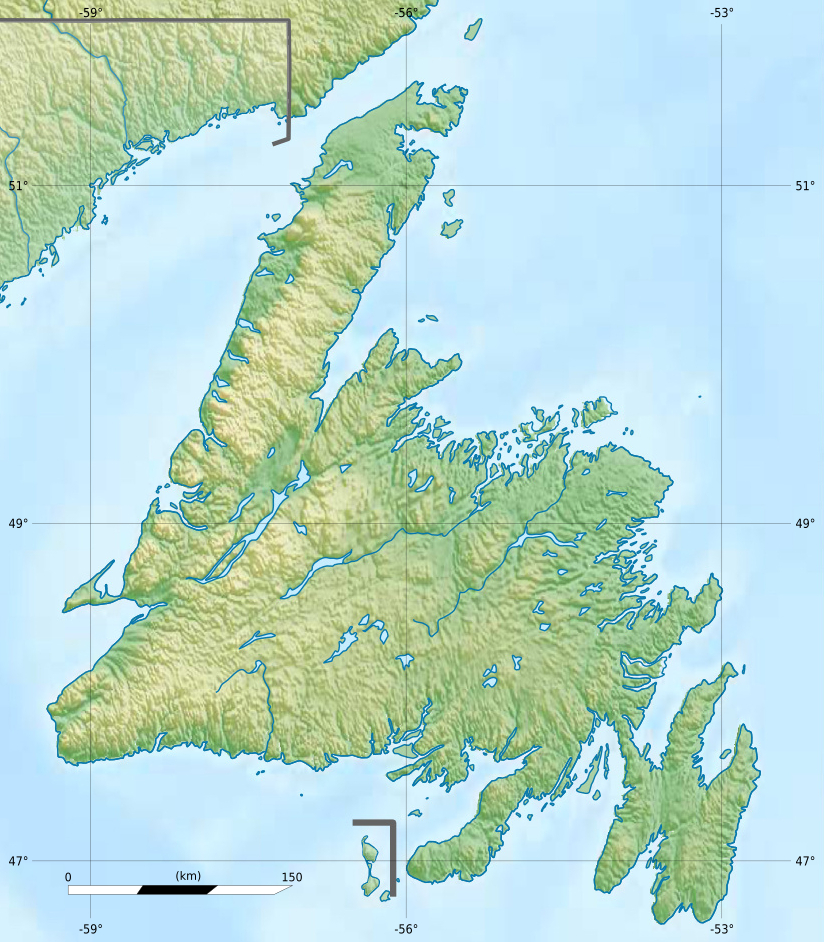
- Location within Newfoundland Location within Canada
- Location: Newfoundland and Labrador, Canada
- Nearest city: St. John's
- Coordinates: 46°37′55″N 53°11′25″W
- Area: 5.7 km^{2} (2.2 sq mi)
- Established: 1984
- Governing body: Newfoundland and Labrador Department of Environment and Conservation

UNESCO World Heritage Site
- Official name: Mistaken Point
- Type: Natural
- Criteria: viii
- Designated: 2016 (40th session)
- Reference no.: 1497
- Region: Europe and North America

Mistaken Point Ecological Reserve is a wilderness area and a UNESCO World Heritage Site located at the southeastern tip of Newfoundland's Avalon Peninsula in the Canadian province of Newfoundland and Labrador. The reserve is home to the namesake Mistaken Point Formation, which contains one of the most diverse and well-preserved collections of Precambrian fossils in the world. Ediacaran fossils discovered at the site constitute the oldest known remnants of multicellular life on Earth.

== Mistaken Point ==
Mistaken Point (46°37′32″N 53°09′41″W) is a small headland on the Avalon Peninsula. Historically, Mistaken Point has been mistaken for Cape Race due to the area's typically foggy weather conditions. Sailors making this error would turn north, thinking they had reached Cape Race Harbour, and immediately run into treacherous rocks.

== History ==
The first fossil to be found in the area, Fractofusus misrai, was discovered in June 1967 by Shiva Balak Misra, an Indian graduate student studying geology at Memorial University of Newfoundland. In the mid-1980s, the site quickly became recognized as an important location containing possibly the oldest metazoan fossils in North America, and the most ancient deep-water marine fossils in the world. A five-kilometre stretch of coastline was first established provisionally as a reserve by the provincial government in 1984 and was permanently designated in 1987. It was later expanded in 2009 after further fossil discoveries.

== Fossils ==
Studies have shown that the Mistaken Point biota represents the oldest Ediacaran fossils known globally, and are the oldest large and architecturally complex organisms in Earth history. The fossil sites along the shore within the reserve were inscribed to the UNESCO World Heritage Sites list on July 17, 2016.

=== Avalonia terrane ===
The fossil terrane of Mistaken Point is the named Avalonian terrane that is found in Western Europe. It formed in the early Cambrian when Pannotia broke from Gondwana (now South America, Africa, Antarctica, and Australia).

=== IUGS geological heritage site ===
In respect of Mistaken Point being 'the best example in the world of an Edicaran fossil community where life first got big and metazoan communities bloomed', the International Union of Geological Sciences (IUGS) included the 'Ediacaran fossil site of Mistaken Point' in its assemblage of 100 'geological heritage sites' around the world in a listing published in October 2022. The organisation defines an 'IUGS Geological Heritage Site' as 'a key place with geological elements and/or processes of international scientific relevance, used as a reference, and/or with a substantial contribution to the development of geological sciences through history.'

== Cultural references ==
- Prolific Canadian rock band The Tragically Hip include a reference to Mistaken Point in "Fly", the fourth track on their 2006 album World Container. The same track also includes a reference to Moonbeam, Ontario.

== See also ==
- List of protected areas of Newfoundland and Labrador
