= Charnwood terrane =

Inferred basement rock terrane of the southern United Kingdom

The Charnwood terrane is one of five inferred fault bounded terranes that make up the basement rocks of the southern United Kingdom. The other notable geological terranes in the region are the Wrekin terrane, Fenland terrane, Cymru terrane and the Monian Composite terrane. The Charnwood terrane is bounded to the west by the Malvern lineament and to the east by the Midlands Microcraton. The geological terrane to the west is the Wrekin Terrane, whilst to the east is Fenland Terrane.

== Charnian Surpergroup ==
The Charnian Supergroup is a volcaniclastic geologic supergroup within the terrane. It preserves fossils dating back to the Ediacaran and through into the Cambrian period, with suggestions that the Brand Group and Maplewell Groups have a major hiatus in-between. It mainly contains volcaniclastics, but is interrupted by and succeeded by greywackes, and is interbedded with pelites, tuffs.

Due to the thickness of the Supergroup, it spans over 61±0 Ma, with a possible lower date of 611±0 Ma and a maximum upper date of 550±0 Ma. This also means that it spans across two Ediacaran assemblages, with the Blackbrook Group and part of the lower Maplewell Group sitting within the Avalon assemblage, whilst the rest of the Maplewell Group sits within the White Sea assemblage.

=== Charnwood Forest ===
The Charnwood Forest holds the most complete and exposed outcrops within the Charnian Supergroup, covering an area of 66 km. There is more than 3.5 km of volcaniclastic strata within the area, alongside units up to 74 m thick of matrix-supported volcaniclastic breccia, which would have been deposited in an unstable deep-marine basin. The Blackbrook Group within the forest has been dated to 569±1 Ma or older, with the lowest possible date of 611±0 Ma, whilst the Maplewell Group and been dated from 569±1 Ma to 557±0 Ma, with the upper-most possible date of 550±0 Ma.

=== Palaeontology ===
The Charnwood Supergroup contains abundant evidence of Ediacaran fauna which include fossil taxa such as Primocandelabrum boyntoni, Bradgatia linfordensis, and the famous Charnia masoni.

== Caldecote Volcanic Formatiom ==
The Caldecote Volcanic Formation, or the Nuneaton quarries near Nuneaton, covers a small area of around 2.8 km, and is less than 100 m (328 ft) at its thickest. It is composed of large coarse-grained to crystal-lithic tuffs, alongside finer grained tuffs. There is also a north-south striking length of microdiorite dykes, getting up to 50 m (164 ft) at its widest.

== Malvern Hills ==
The Malvern Hills lies directly on the boundary between the Wrekin and Charnwood terranes. As for the Charnwood side, the hills is dominated by the Malvern Plutonic Complex, which has been dated to 680±0 Ma, which in some parts has been affected by garnet–amphibolite metamorphism, heterogeneous ductile, dated at 650±0 Ma, alongside an injection of pegmatites, dated to 610±0 Ma. Undeformed rhyolitic tuff is also found here, and has been dated to 566±0 Ma, which is suggested to be the date of eruption. Alongside this, the aforementioned north-south striking length of microdiorite dykes can also be found here, cutting through the noted ductile fabrics.

=== Warren House Formation ===
The Warren House Formation outcrops near Broad Down, and covers a small area of around 0.5 km. It consists mainly of pillowed, interbedded spilitic basalt lavas, alongside tuffs, and is much less deformed than the Malvern Plutonic Complex in which it resides.

== Gravity anomalies ==
There are also some gravity anomalies within the southern areas of England, namely the South-Central England Magnetic Anomaly, South England Magnetic Anomaly, and London–Luton Magnetic Anomaly, as well as some around the midlands, like the Malvern–Worcester Basin Magnetic Anomaly and the Welsh Borderland Magnetic Anomaly west of the Malvern Hills.
