= Nama assemblage =

Ediacaran biotic assemblage

Nama Assemblage
- ~550 – 538.8 ± 0.2 Ma
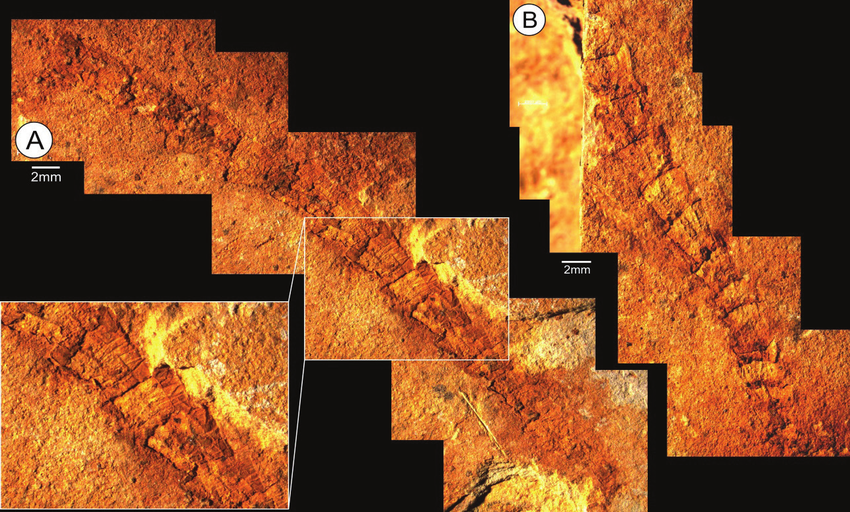
- Specimens of Cloudina carinata from the Tamengo Formation of Brazil.

Chronology
← / Second pulse of the end-Ediacaran extinction; ← / ~Baykonurian glaciation; ← / First pulse of the end-Ediacaran extinction; ← / Avalon Explosion; ← / Shuram excursion reaches its peak
Major Glacial period; Shuram excursion
Stratigraphic scale of the ICS subdivisions and Ediacaran biotic assmblages Vertical axis scale: millions of years ago

The Nama assemblage was the last of the Ediacaran biotic assemblages. Following the Avalon and White Sea assemblages, it spanned from c. 550 Ma to c. 539 Ma, coinciding with the Terminal Ediacaran biozone. The assemblage was characterized by a faunal turnover, with the decline of the preexisting White Sea biota. The drop of diversity has been compared to the mass extinctions of the Phanerozoic. A second drop of diversity occurred at the Ediacaran–Cambrian boundary, concluding the Nama assemblages with the end-Ediacaran extinction.

== Etymology and definitions ==
The Nama assemblage is named after the Nama Group from the Tsaus Mountains of Namibia, which preserves a Late Ediacaran record of soft-bodied fossils. The biota of the Namibian sites clusters with similar biotas found in the Southwestern United States, South China and British Columbia, leading to a Nama assemblage being first defined by Gehling in 2001. This definition of a biological assemblage usually includes the totality of the biota found in these strata, which in the case of the Nama assemblage exhibits a strong temporal element.

The full division of the Ediacaran biota into three separate assemblages was first postulated by Ben Waggoner in 2003 through parsimony analysis of endemicity. This study relied on temporal, paleogeographical and paleoenvironmental data. This same clustering was later recovered through hierarchical clustering and non-metric multidimensional scaling. Similar methods, supplemented with a network analysis-based clustering of genera into paleocommunities, or recurrent associations of taxa, later hinted at an additional cluster (Miahoe) overlapping with the Avalon and White Sea assemblages. The Nama assemblage was also recovered and interpreted as a paleocommunity. A closely related Terminal Ediacaran biozone, contrasting with the previous Ediacaran biota biozone, was recovered when including formations in the network analysis, comprising species-poor formations mostly consisting of Nama genera.

A proposed definition of the Nama assemblage as an evolutionary fauna by Wood and coauthors restricts it to new morphogroups such as calcifying metazoans, cloudinids and complex trace fossils, excluding holdovers from previous faunas such as Paracharnia. Under this definition, the assemblage's lower boundary would be the oldest appearance of Cloudina in the fossil record, placing the boundary at 550 Ma. This definition distinguishes the Nama assemblage from the Terminal Ediacaran biozone, the latter of which includes both holdovers and newer taxa.

== Paleohistory ==
During the Nama assemblage, extinction rates outpaced origination, leading to a decline in biodiversity.

The Nama assemblage is bounded from the earlier White Sea assemblage and later Cambrian period by two major episodes of faunal turnover, considered to be pulses of the end-Ediacaran extinction. The genus diversity was lower than in the earlier Ediacaran and later Fortunian biotas, a fact that has been shown to be independent of sampling bias. Nonetheless, the decline in Ediacaran biota taxa was accompanied by a rise in sessile eumetazoans, with new developments such as the rise of predation and biomineralization. Another decline in diversity has been also proposed around c. 545 Ma.

=== Early decline ===
The decline in biodiversity from the previous White Sea assemblage has been argued to have been caused by decreasing sea oxygen levels, favoring the survival of animals with a higher surface-to-volume ratio. This was, however, contested by findings showing a decline in both hard-bodied and soft-bodied fauna starting before the fall in oxygen levels. Under this model, the widespread anoxia in deeper waters would have minimally affected the Ediacaran fauna, largely concentrated in shallow water areas in continental shelf settings like the Nama Group. Conversely, ecological change may have been responsible for the decline in oxygen levels.

== Biota ==
The soft-bodied Ediacaran biota of the Nama assemblage, in decline compared to the White Sea assemblage, was dominated by erniettomorphs, although rangeomorphs, arboreomorphs and dipleurozoans were also present.

While the Late Ediacaran assemblages are mostly temporally stratified, holdovers from the Avalon and White Sea assemblages were present later than 550 million years ago, and are usually assigned to the Nama assemblage on a chronological basis regardless of biological affinity. These include Hiemalora, Charnia and the arboreomorph Arborea. However, some definitions exclude these organisms from the Nama assemblage, distinguishing it from the temporal Terminal Ediacaran biozone.

The benthic, calcified Namacalathus is only known from the Nama assemblage, although its affiliations remain disputed.

=== Tubular organisms ===
The first traces of the tubular cloudinids appear in the Nama assemblage, including both the mineralized Cloudina and the softer-bodied Conotubus. Other tubular organisms are known, such as Namacalathus, Sinotubulites, Corumbella and Gaojiashania.
