= Charnian Supergroup =

Geologic supergroup in the United Kingdom

- Stratigraphic range: Ediacaran 611–550 Ma
- Type: Supergroup
- Unit of: Charnwood terrane
- Sub-units: Maplewell Group; Hanging Rocks Formation; Bradgate Formation; Beacon Hill Formation; Blackbrook Group; Blackbrook Reservoir Formation; Ives Head Formation
- Thickness: 3,558 m (11,673 ft)

Location
- Region: Leicestershire
- Country: United Kingdom

Type section
- Named for: Charnwood Forest

The Charnian Supergroup is a geologic supergroup in the United Kingdom, and is a part of the wider Charnwood terrane. It preserves fossils dating back to the Ediacaran and through into the Cambrian period, with suggestions that the Brand Group and Maplewell Groups have a major hiatus in-between. It mainly contains volcaniclastics, but is interrupted by and succeeded by greywackes, and is interbedded with pelites, tuffs.

Due to the thickness of the Supergroup, it spans over 61±0 Ma, with a possible lower date of 611±0 Ma and a maximum upper date of 550±0 Ma. This also means that it spans across two Ediacaran assemblages, with the Blackbrook Group and part of the lower Maplewell Group sitting within the Avalon assemblage, whilst the rest of the Maplewell Group sits within the White Sea assemblage.

The Brand Group was originally a part of the supergroup, until the discovery of several ichnogenera, like Teichichnus, which helped to date it to the Lower Cambrian, and was subsequently taken out of the Charnian Supergroup.

== Maplewell Group ==
The Maplewell Group is Ediacaran in age, and consists of three formations, and is the thickest group, coming in at 1768 m (5,800 ft). Topmost of the group, is the Hanging Rocks Formation, which consists of interbedded greywackes and lithic tuff. The middle Bradgate Formation is made up of tuffeceous pelite, dust tuffs and pelite, with thin horizons of medium-grained greywackes, and nearer to its base there is slump breccias composed of clasts. The Beacon Hill Formation is the basal unit of the Maplewell Group, and consists of tuffeceous pelite, with coarse-grained tuffs and greywackes, as well as slump and pull-apart breccias. The Hanging Rocks Formation was once a part of the Brand Hills Formation as a Member, but was then split out to be its own formation within this group, although it is occasionally referred to the Brand Group. In ascending stratigraphic order (lowest to highest):

- Hanging Rocks Formation
- Bradgate Formation
  - Hallgate Member
  - Sliding Stone Slump Breccia Member
- Beacon Hill Formation
  - Old John Member
  - Outwoods Member
  - Buck Hills Member
  - Sandhills Lodge Member
  - Beacon Tuffs Member
  - Charnwood Lodge Member
  - Benscliffe Member

== Blackbrook Group ==
The Blackbrook Group is Ediacaran in age, and consists of two formations, and is the basal-most unit of the Charnian Supergroup, with its thickest point sitting at 1,430 m (4,691 ft), possibly more. The upper layers of the group are a part of the Blackbrook Reservoir Formation, and is made up of tuffeceous pelite, tuffs and coarse-grained tuffs. The lower layers of the group are a part of the Ives Head Formation, which is also the basal-most formation in the entire supergroup, and consists of slump breccia, coarse-grained tuffs and dust tuffs, with fine-grained and tuffeceous greywackes in the middle part of the formation, and nearer to its base are sandstones and dacite lavas. In stratigraphical order, i.e. uppermost/youngest first:

- Blackbrook Formation
- Ives Head Formation
  - South Quarry Slump Breccia Member
  - Lubcloud Greywackes Member
  - Morley Lane Tuffs Member

== Dating ==
Within the strata is clasts of diorites horizons that allow for zircon U–Pb dating and, noted within the South Charnwood Diorites found in the hiatus between the Brand and Maplewell Groups, a date is returned of 603±2 Ma, suggesting the intrusion is Lower Ediacaran in age, which led to the research and discovery that the Brand Group was Cambrian in age, and is no longer assigned to the Charnian Supergroup.

Zircon has also been found within tuff in the Beacon Hill Formation, and another tuff at Brandon Hill (Also within the Beacon Hill Formation. The dates recovered for both of these samples were 559±2 Ma and 566±3 Ma respectively, meaning the Beacon Hill Formation temporally correlates with the Trepassey Formation in Newfoundland and Labrador. Alongside this, a more recent study within the supergroup found more zircon samples, from the oldest and youngest known parts of the Maplewell Group and the lower parts of the Blackbrook Group, with the dates recovered from the Maplewell Group samples being 569±1 Ma and 557±0 Ma, showing that the uppermost part of the Charnian Supergroup overlaps the Trepassey Formation, and the preliminary dates recovered from the Blackbrook Group at around 611±0 Ma, although it has been noted that a more refined dating is required to confirm this.

== See also ==
- List of fossiliferous stratigraphic units in the United Kingdom
