= End-Ediacaran extinction =

Mass extinction event at the end of the Ediacaran period, 539 million years ago

The End-Ediacaran extinction, also called the Kotlin Crisis, is a mass extinction believed to have occurred near the end of the Ediacaran period, the final period of the Proterozoic eon. Evidence suggesting that such a mass extinction occurred includes a massive reduction in diversity of acritarchs, the sudden disappearance of the Ediacara biota and calcifying organisms, and the time gap before Cambrian organisms "replaced" them. Some lines of evidence suggests that there may have been two distinct pulses of the extinction event, one occurring 550 million years ago and the other 539 million years ago.

== Evidence ==
=== Biotic evidence ===
==== Ediacaran organisms ====
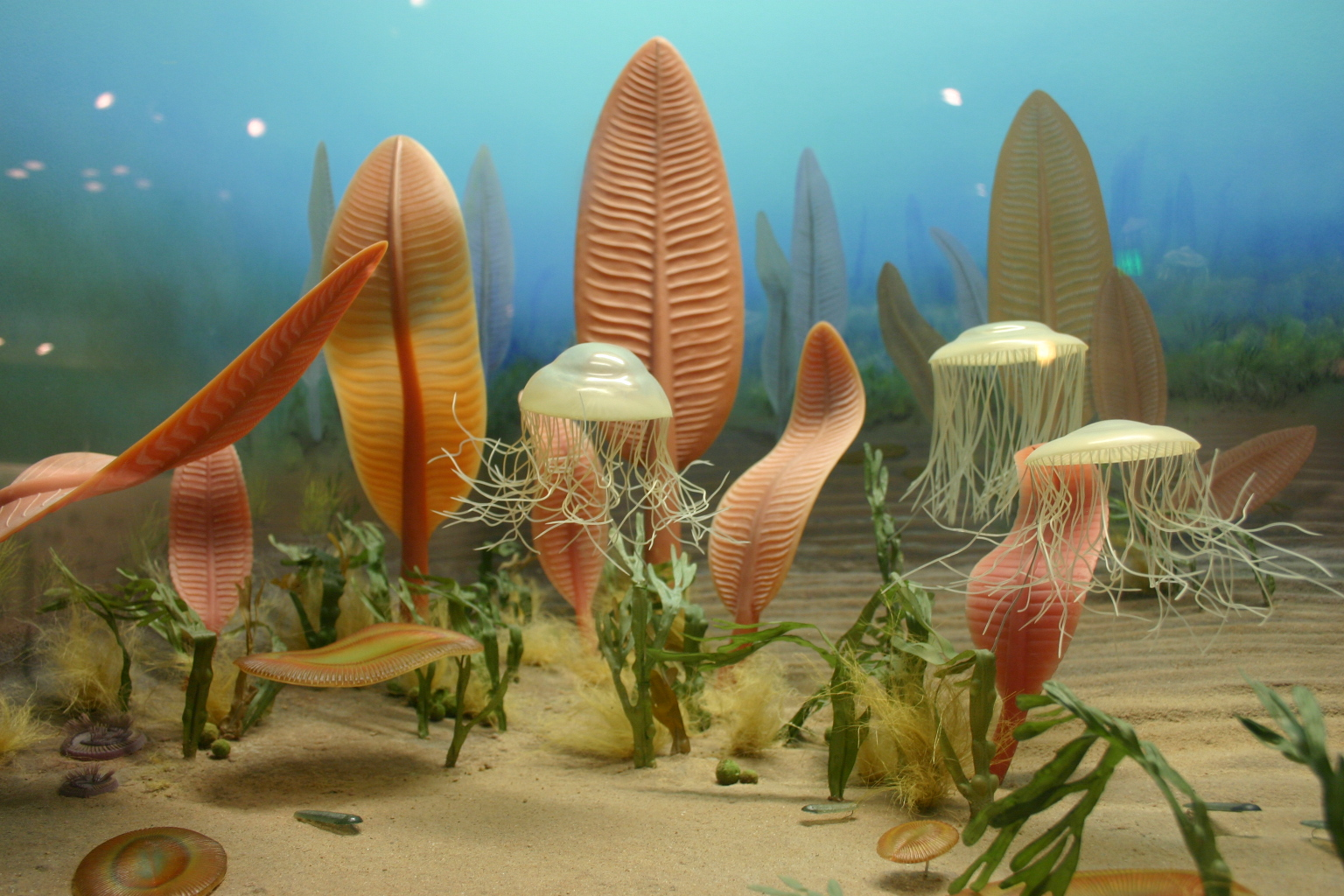
Most of the Ediacaran organisms featured in this image went extinct because of the extinction event. The "jellyfish" in this outdated reconstruction likely did not exist.

During the Ediacaran period, two main groups of organisms are found in the fossil record: the "Ediacaran biota" of soft-bodied organisms, preserved by microbial mats; and calcifying organisms such as Cloudina and Namacalathus, which had a carbonate skeleton. Because both these groups disappear abruptly at the end of the Ediacaran period, 538.8 ± 0.2 million years ago, their disappearance cannot simply represent the closure of a preservational window, as had previously been suspected.

Additionally, the late Ediacaran saw a faunal turnover between the White Sea biota, which lived between 560 and 550 million years ago, and the Nama biota, which lived between 550 and 539 million years ago. The transition from the White Sea to the Nama biota saw a major reduction in diversity that was not recovered during the interval of the depauperate Nama biota, which has been attributed to either increased biological competition or an anoxic event and in either case suggests that large-scale extinction began well before the boundary between the Ediacaran and Cambrian.

==== Post-Ediacaran survivors ====
The fossil record of the earliest Cambrian, just after the Ediacaran period, shows a sudden increase in burrowing activity and diversity. However, the Cambrian explosion of animals that gave rise to body fossils did not happen instantaneously. This implies that the "explosion" did not represent animals "replacing" the incumbent organisms, and pushing them gradually to extinction; rather, the data are more consistent with a radiation of animals to fill in vacant niches, left empty as an extinction cleared out the pre-existing fauna.

The theory that all Ediacarans became extinct at the start of the Cambrian is disproven if any post-Ediacaran survivors are found. Organisms from the lower Cambrian, such as Thaumaptilon, were once thought to be Ediacarans, but this hypothesis no longer has many adherents. One possible Ediacaran survivor whose status is still open to scrutiny is Ediacaria booleyi, a purported holdfast structure known from the upper Cambrian. If this does turn out to be a true Ediacaran, the biota cannot have disappeared completely. Disbelievers have claimed that the fossils do not actually have a biological origin, which does not seem to be the case—evidence is mounting to suggest that it is an organism (or at least of biological origin, perhaps a microbial colony), just not one that is related to the Ediacara biota.

Some organisms clearly survived the extinction since life on Earth has continued. However, very few organisms are known from both sides of the Ediacaran-Cambrian boundary. One such organism is the agglutinated foraminifera Platysolenites. Swartpuntia is one well known late Ediacaran vendobiont, which survived into the earliest Cambrian. Cambrian Erytholus is a similar sandstone cast to Ediacaran Ventogyrus. Ordovician and Silurian Rutgersella and Devonian Protonympha have been interpreted as surviving vendobionts, comparable with Ediacaran Dickinsonia and Spriggina, respectively.

=== Geochemical evidence ===
Negative δ^{13}C excursions—geochemical signals often associated with mass extinctions—are observed during the Late Ediacaran. The Shuram excursion occurred around the same time as the boundary between the White Sea and Nama assemblages. Another major negative carbon isotope excursion is known to have occurred at the end of the Ediacaran period and the beginning of the Cambrian.

=== Sedimentary evidence ===
The transition between the White Sea and Nama biotas near the end of the Ediacaran is reflected in the geological record by an increase in black shale deposition, representing global anoxia. This may be related to global changes in oceanic circulation and may have been the worst marine anoxic event of the last 550 million years, although its causal relationship with the White Sea-Nama biotic turnover is controversial and has been challenged by studies concluding that this expansion of anoxia postdated the turnover.
