= Hanging Rocks Formation =

Geologic formation in Leicestershire, the United Kingdom

- Stratigraphic range: Ediacaran 557–550 Ma
- Conglomerate of Hanging Rocks Formation, Charnian Supergroup.
- Type: Formation
- Unit of: Maplewell Group
- Sub-units: Hallgate and Sliding Stone Slump Breccia Members
- Underlies: Brand Hills Formation; Diorite unconformity
- Overlies: Bradgate Formation
- Thickness: 50 m (164 ft)

Lithology
- Primary: Tuff
- Other: Graywacke

Location
- Region: Leicestershire
- Country: United Kingdom

Type section
- Named for: Bradgate Park

The Hanging Rocks Formation is a geologic formation in Leicestershire, and is the youngest and smallest of the Maplewell Group and the larger Charnian Supergroup which it is a part of. Due to this, and the fact that the rocks are not well exposed at both the top and base, there have been no Ediacaran fossils found to date, unlike the two underlying Bradgate and Beacon Hill Formations.

== Dating ==
Despite the poor exposure of the formation, scientists were able to collect zircon crystals from the lower parts of the formation, allowing them to perform zircon U–Pb dating, which recovered a date of 556±6.4 Ma, close to the Bradgate Formations top age of 557 Ma. It is noted that the top of the formation is capped at a zircon age of roughly 550 Ma, which is just before the first formations of the Nama assemblage were deposited.
