= White Sea (disambiguation) =

White Sea is the southern inlet of the Barents Sea in northwest Russia.

White Sea may also refer to:

- Akdeniz or "White Sea", a Turkish term for the Mediterranean Sea
- White Sea, a South Slavic term for the Aegean Sea
- White Sea, an American solo music project by Morgan Kibby
- Operation Safed Sagar (lit. 'Operation White Sea'), 1999 Indian military operation during the Kargil War

== See also ==
- White Sea assemblage
