= Bradgate Formation =

Geologic formation in Leicestershire, the United Kingdom

- Stratigraphic range: late Ediacaran; ~561–557 Ma
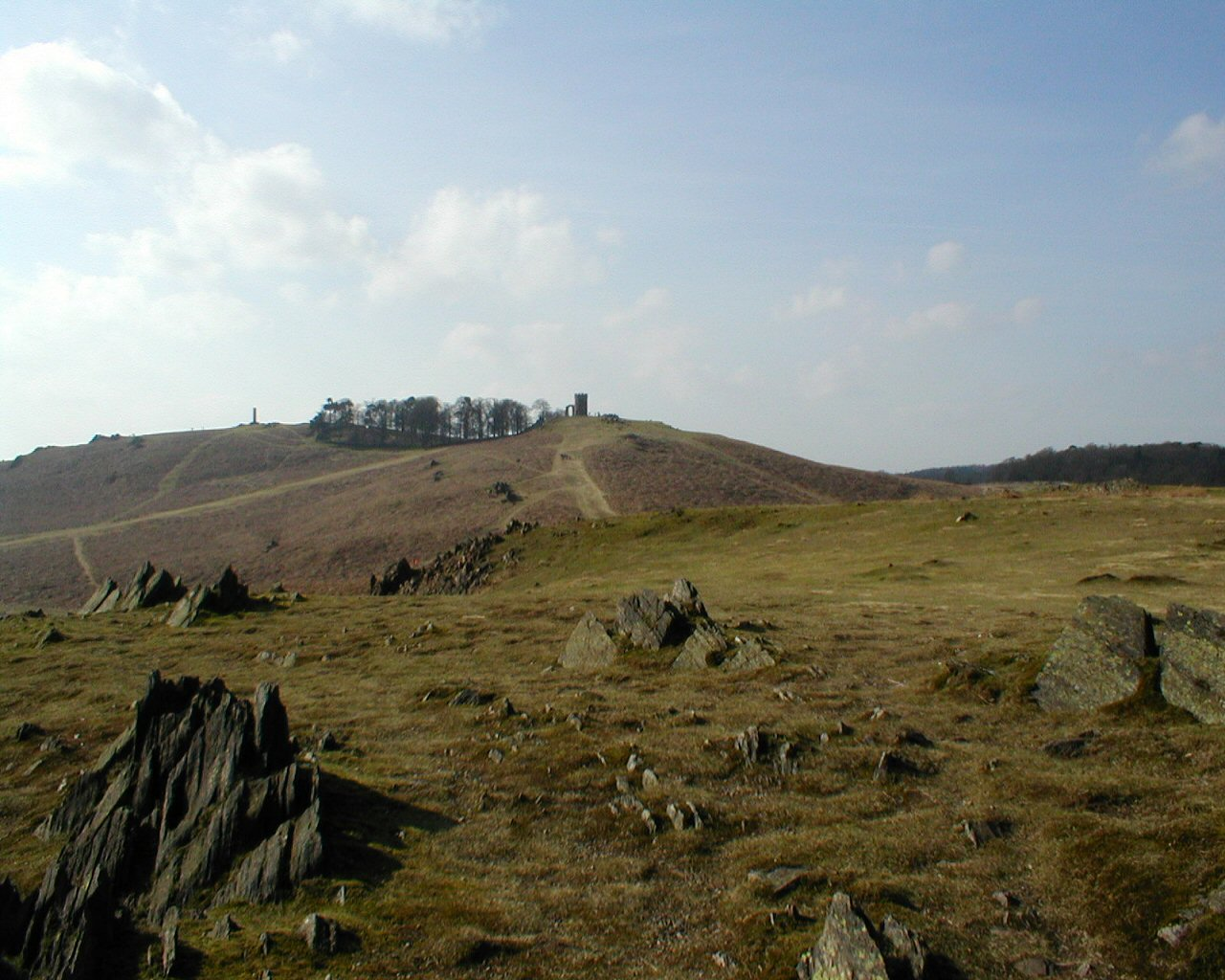
- Bradgate Park, which gave the name to the formation, which itself can be found here.
- Type: Formation
- Unit of: Maplewell Group
- Sub-units: See: Members
- Underlies: Hanging Rocks Formation
- Overlies: Beacon Hill Formation
- Thickness: 649 m (2,129 ft)

Lithology
- Primary: Pelite
- Other: Tuff, Graywacke, Breccia

Location
- Region: Leicestershire
- Country: United Kingdom

Type section
- Named for: Bradgate Park

The Bradgate Formation is a geologic formation in Leicestershire, and lies within the wider Bradgate Park area. It also preserves fossils dating back to the late Ediacaran period.

== Geology ==
The formation is composed of various volcaniclastic rocks, like tuff, and is broken up into two members. It is overlain by the Hanging Rocks Formation, whilst it is underlain by the Beacon Hill Formation.

=== Members ===
The Bradgate Formation is formally split up into two members, which are as follows, in ascending stratigraphic order (lowest to highest):

- Sliding Stone Slump Breccia Member: This member, also sometimes referred to as "Park Breccia Member", is the thinnest of the two, only getting up to 9 m (30 ft) thick. The lower 4 m (13 ft) of this member is primarily composed of slump breccias as the name suggests, which contain clasts that are composed of dust tuff, alongside tuffaceous pelites, set into a matrix of coarse-grained tuffs and medium-grained graywackes. Meanwhile the upper 5 m (16 ft) of this member sees the breccias fade away, only being composed of coarse-grained tuffs that are andesitic in nature, and slowly turn into medium-grained tuffaceous graywackes.
- Hallgate Member: This member is the thickest of the two, getting up to 640 m (2,100 ft) thick. It is predominated by tuffaceous pelites, as well as pelites and dust tuffs. Throughout, there are also thin layers of coarse-grained tuffs and medium-grained graywackes.

== Dating ==
At the base of the Bradgate Formation, zircon samples were collected to take U-Pb dating on them and determine the overall age of the formation and fossils. The zircon sample JNC 912, from the base of the formation, returned a date of 561.85±0.33 Ma. Meanwhile a zircon sample, JNC 846, collected from near the base of the overlying Hanging Rocks Formation returned an age of 556.6±6.4 Ma, which would constrain the Bradgate Formation entirely within the Avalon assemblage, and correlating it roughly with the Trepassey Formation.

== Paleobiota ==
The Bradgate Formation contains the richest fossil beds within the Charnian Supergroup, from frondose organisms like Bradgatia and Charnia, which when the latter was discovered, showed definitive proof that macroscopic life did indeed exist before the Cambrian, to discoid forms like Aspidella.

Color key: Taxon / Reclassified taxon / Taxon falsely reported as present / Dubious taxon or junior synonym / Ichnotaxon / Ootaxon / Morphotaxon

Notes
Uncertain or tentative taxa are in small text
~~crossed out~~ taxa are discredited.

=== Petalonamae ===
Genus	Species	Notes	Images
Bradgatia	B. linfordensis	Sessile frondose organism.	
Charnia	C. masoni	Sessile frondose organism, and first organism found within this formation.	
Charniodiscus	C. concentricus	Sessile frondose organism.	
Hylaecullulus	H. fordi	Sessile frondose organism.	
Primocandelabrum	P. aelfwynnia; P. aethelflaedia; P. boyntoni	Sessile frondose organism.	
Vinlandia	V. antecedens	Sessile frondose organism.	

=== Cnidaria ===
Genus	Species	Notes	Images
Auroralumina	A. attenboroughii	Early sessile crown-group medusozoan cnidarian.	

=== incertae sedis ===
Genus	Species	Notes	Images
Aspidella	Aspidella sp.	Enigmatic discoidal fossil.	
Thectardis	T. avalonensis	Discoid organism, possibly holdfasts of petalonamids.	

=== Undescribed forms ===
Genus	Species	Notes	Images
Gladius form	???	Enigmatic fossil, described to be in the shape of a gladius sword.	
Hemispherical form	???	Enigmatic fossil, described to be hemispherical in shape, with bifurcating radial ribs.	
Lanceolate frond	???	Enigmatic frondose fossil, described to be in the shape of a lance head, which has collapsed in onto itself.	

== See also ==
- List of fossiliferous stratigraphic units in England
