= Beacon Hill Formation =

Geologic formation in Leicestershire, the United Kingdom

- Stratigraphic range: late Ediacaran; ~569–561 Ma
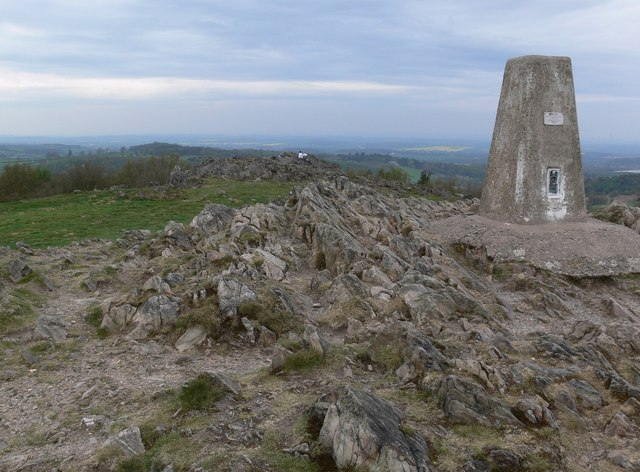
- Beacon Hill, which gave the name to the formation, which itself can be found here.
- Type: Formation
- Unit of: Maplewell Group
- Sub-units: Old John, Outwoods, Buck Hills, Sandhills Lodge, Beacon Tuffs, Charnwood Lodge, Benscliffe Members
- Underlies: Bradgate Formation
- Overlies: Blackbrook Reservoir Formation
- Thickness: 1,119 m (3,671 ft)

Lithology
- Primary: Tuff
- Other: Pelite, Greywacke, Breccia

Location
- Region: Leicestershire
- Country: United Kingdom

Type section
- Named for: Beacon Hill

The Beacon Hill Formation is a geologic formation in Leicestershire, and lies within the wider Beacon Hill area. It preserves fossils dating back to the Lower Ediacaran period.

== Dating ==
At the top and base of the Beacon Hill Formation, zircon samples were collected to take U-Pb dating on them and determine the overall age of the formation and fossils. The zircon sample JNC 912, from the top of the formation, returned a date of 561.85±0.33 Ma. Meanwhile a zircon sample, JNC 846, collected from the base of the formation yielded a date of 569.1±0.9 Ma, which would constrain the Beacon Hill Formation entirely within the Avalon assemblage, and correlating it roughly with the Mistaken Point Formation.

== Paleobiota ==
The Beacon Hill Formation contains the oldest best preserved fossils within the Charnian Supergroup, most of which can be found in the Outwoods Member, with some found in the overlying and underlying members.

Color key
Taxon	Reclassified taxon	Taxon falsely reported as present	Dubious taxon or junior synonym	Ichnotaxon	Ootaxon	Morphotaxon

Notes
Uncertain or tentative taxa are in small text; ~~crossed out~~ taxa are discredited.

=== Petalonamae ===
Genus	Species	Notes	Images
Charnia	C. masoni	Sessile frondose organism.	

=== incertae sedis ===
Genus	Species	Notes	Images
Aspidella	Aspidella sp.	Enigmatic discoidal fossil.	
Cyclomedusa	C. davidi	Enigmatic discoidal fossil.	
Hiemalora	Hiemalora sp.	Discoid organism, possibly holdfasts of petalonamids.	

=== Ivesheadiomorph ===
Genus	Species	Notes	Images
Pseudovendia	P. charnwoodensis	Poorly preserved organism, originally thought to be an early arthropod.	

== See also ==
- List of fossiliferous stratigraphic units in the United Kingdom
