= Malvern line =

Geology of England

The Malvern line or Malvern lineament is a north-south aligned lineament which runs through the Malvern Hills of western England and extends southwards towards Bristol and northwards past Stourport.

It consists of a series of faults and folds which have the effect of bringing old Malvernian rocks to the surface. Being largely hard igneous rocks, the Malverns complex rocks have resisted erosion better than those of the surrounding countryside and result in a striking line of hills of which the Malvern Hills are the most impressive. The Abberley Hills to their north also form a part of this lineament. This line is considered to mark the edge of two terranes – two once separate fragments of the Earth's crust now joined as one – the Wrekin terrane to the west and the Charnwood terrane to the east.
