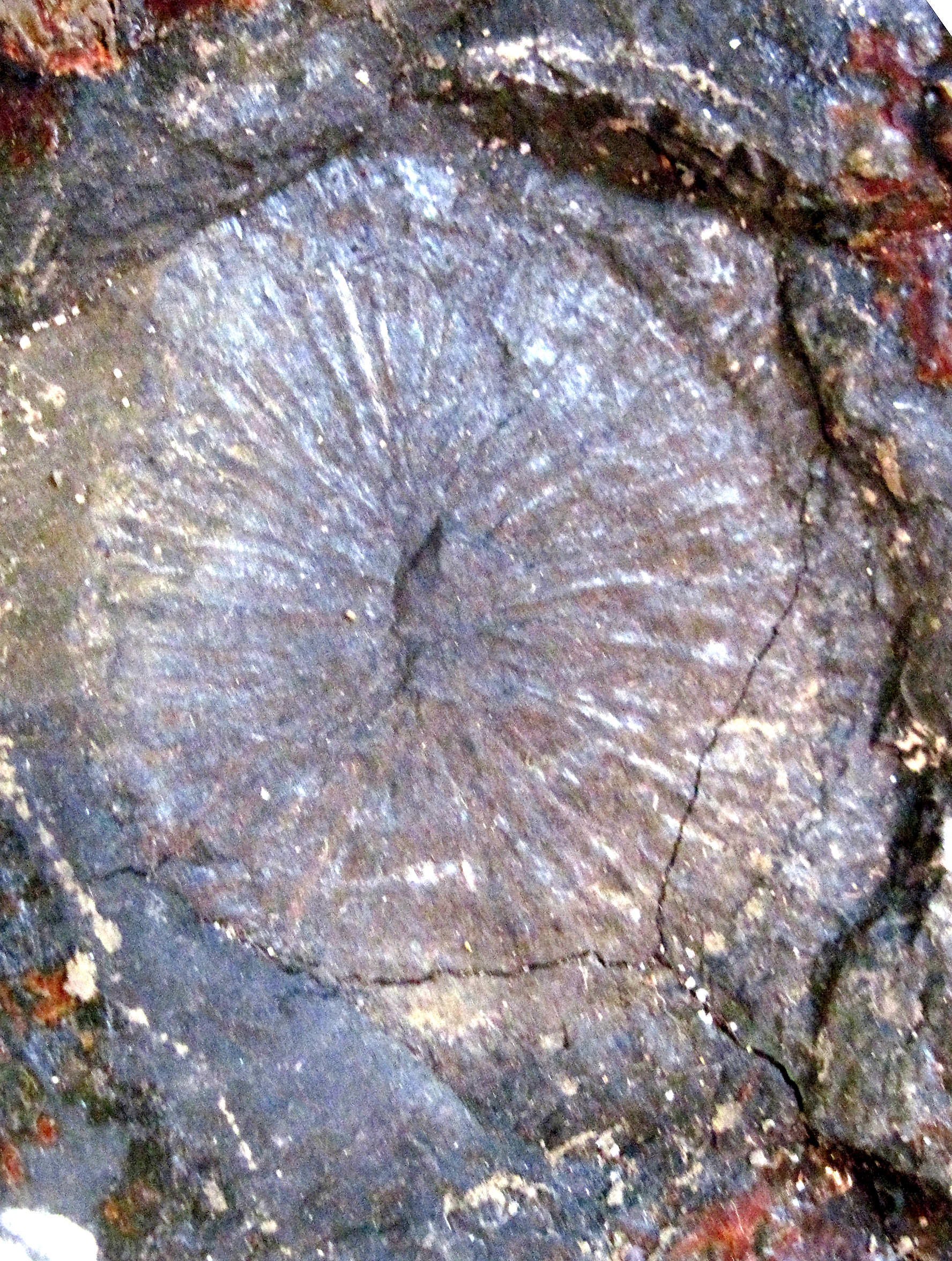
- Rutgersella truexi from the Early Silurian Shawangunk Formation of Delaware Water Gap, Pennsylvania

Scientific classification
- Domain: incertae sedis
- Genus: †Rutgersella; Johnson and Fox 1968

Species
- Rutgersella truexi

= Rutgersella =

Rutgersella Temporal range: Early Silurian–Early Silurian Possible Ediacaran reports

Fossil classification

Rutgersella truexi is a form species for problematic fossils of Early Silurian age in Pennsylvania. It has been of special interest because of its morphological similarity with the iconic Ediacaran fossil Dickinsonia, and may have been a late surviving vendobiont.

== Description ==
Rutgersella truexi is a flat, segmented fossil, with both radial and bilateral symmetry like Dickinsonia, but with a shorter midline. The fossils are pyritized; some internal chambers are filled with chalcedony, so that they are preserved along with proposed "basal rhizines".

Controversially, according to Retallack, these observations suggest affinities with lichens, and perhaps the fungal phylum Glomeromycota, a statement not currently supported by more verifiable palaeontologists.

== Gallery ==
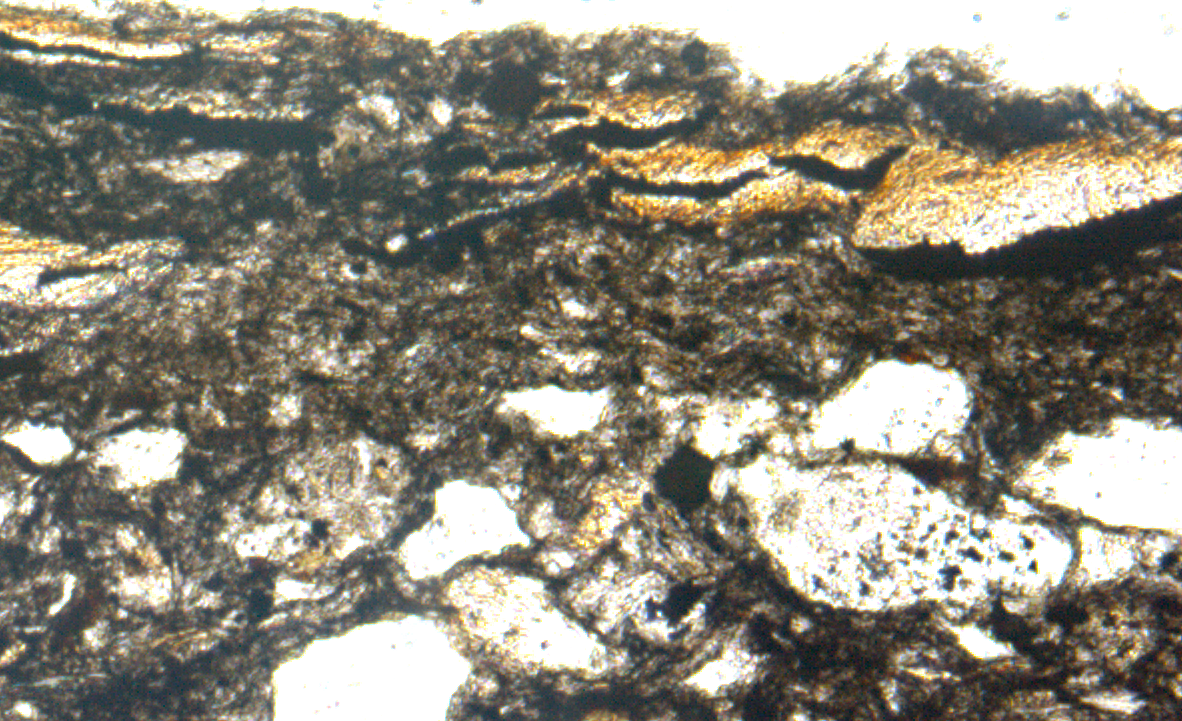
Petrographic thin section of Rutgersella truexi from Early Silurian Shawangunk Formation of Pennsylvania
