= White Sea assemblage =

Ediacaran biotic assemblage

White Sea Assemblage
- ~560 – ~550 Ma
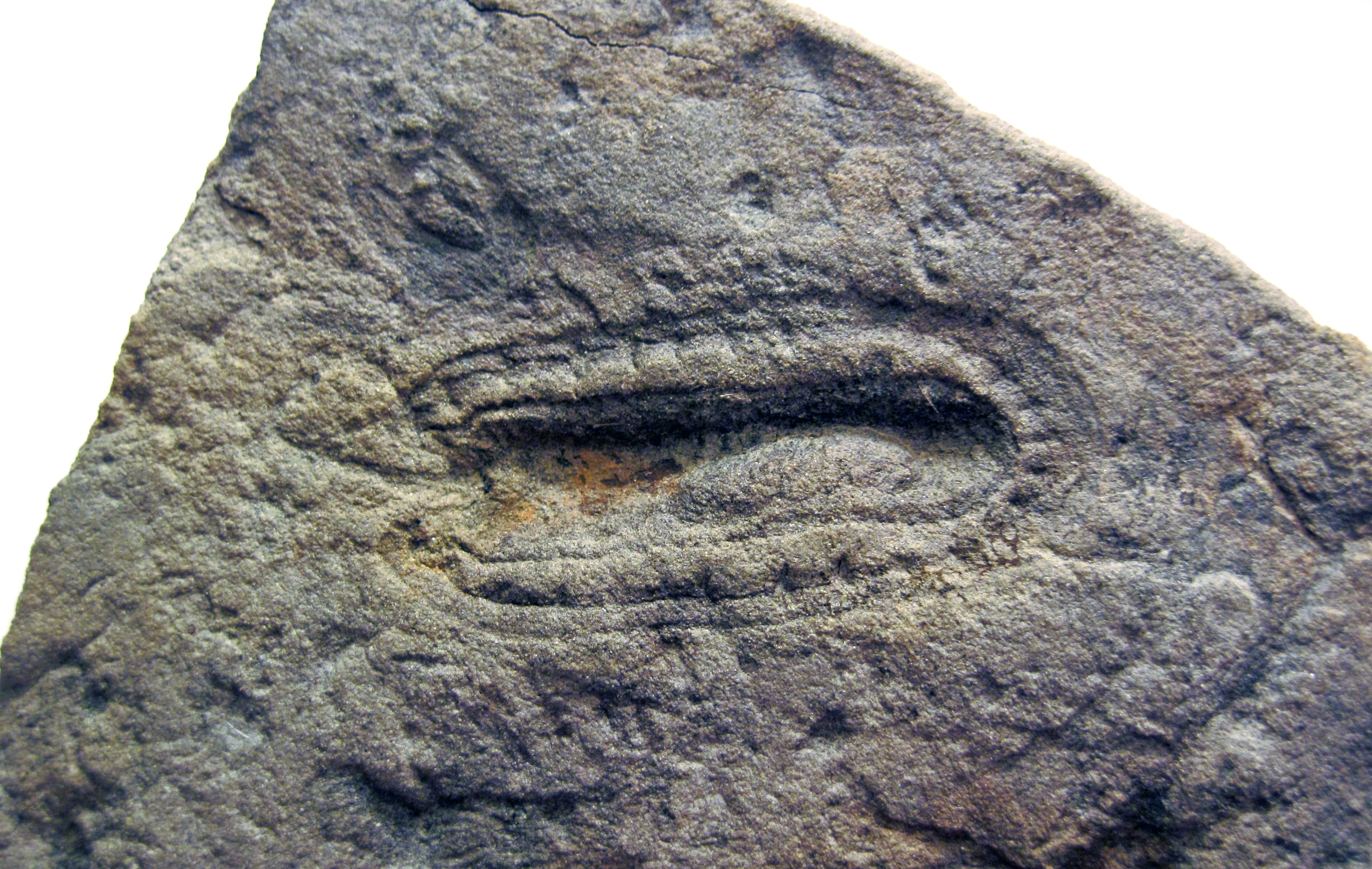
- Kimberella fossil from the Ustʹ Pinega Formation near the White Sea in Russia.

Chronology
← / Second pulse of the end-Ediacaran extinction; ← / ~Baykonurian glaciation; ← / First pulse of the end-Ediacaran extinction; ← / Avalon Explosion; ← / Shuram excursion reaches its peak
Major Glacial period; Shuram excursion
Stratigraphic scale of the ICS subdivisions and Ediacaran biotic assmblages Vertical axis scale: millions of years ago

The White Sea assemblage, also known as the Ediacaran assemblage, was the second of the three Late Ediacaran biotic assemblages of fossils, following the Avalon assemblage and preceding the Nama assemblage.

== Overview ==
This assemblage is named after Russia's White Sea or Australia's Ediacara Hills, and is marked by much higher diversity than the Avalon or Nama assemblages. It spanned from c. 560 Ma to c. 550 Ma. Showing an increase in genus diversity from the Avalon assemblage, it concluded with a faunal turnover often characterized as the first pulse of the end-Ediacaran extinction, with only 20% of White Sea taxa found in the later Nama assemblage despite similar taphonomic processes.

Most fossils are preserved as imprints in microbial beds, but a few are preserved within sandy units.

== Australia ==
In Australia, they are typically found in red gypsiferous and calcareous paleosols formed on loess and flood deposits in an arid cool temperate paleoclimate. There are many fossil beds of this era in the Ediacara Hills of South Australia, west of the Flinders Ranges.

In the mid-1980s, rich fossil beds were discovered on a cattle station called Nilpena Station, that later became the focus of much research as well as an application for World Heritage listing to help protect the site. The entire property has now been sold to the state government to become part of the Nilpena Ediacara National Park. Since the early 2000s, around 40 fossil surfaces preserving organisms from the White Sea Assemblage have been excavated from the Ediacara Member of the Rawnsley Quartzite in the Ediacara Hills. The fossil bed known as 1T-F has the highest diversity of Ediacaran fossils found so far, which also show significant ecological complexity. The bed includes more than 400 fossils across 16 genera.
