= Maplewell Group =

- Stratigraphic range: late Ediacaran; ~569–550 Ma
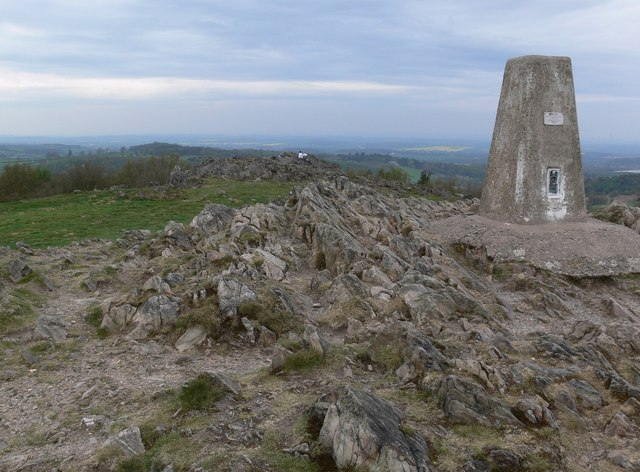
- Rocks of the Beacon Hill Formation outcropping at Beacon Hill, Leicestershire
- Type: Group
- Unit of: Charnian Supergroup
- Sub-units: Hanging Rocks Formation; Bradgate Formation; Hallgate Member; Sliding Stone Slump Breccia Member; Beacon Hill Formation; Old John Member; Outwoods Member; Buck Hills Member; Sandhills Lodge Member; Beacon Tuffs Member; Charnwood Lodge Member; Benscliffe Member
- Underlies: Brand Group; Diorite unconformity
- Overlies: Blackbrook Group
- Thickness: 1768 m (5,800 ft)

Lithology
- Primary: volcaniclastic sandstone
- Other: mudstone, breccia, siltstone, tuff, dacite, andesite

Location
- Region: Leicestershire
- Country: United Kingdom

The Maplewell Group is an Ediacaran lithostratigraphic group (a sequence of rock strata) present in Leicestershire in the English Midlands. The strata are exposed in Charnwood Forest, west of Leicester. Besides a variety of volcaniclastic sandstones and mudstones, there are various breccias and tuffs. The tuffs which were laid down in water are fossiliferous; Charnia, Charniodiscus and Cyclomedusa, are all recorded from these rocks.

With the discovery of Teichichnus in the overlying Swithland Formation of the Brand Group, alongside several other ichnogenera, researchers were able to confidentially date the Brand Group to the Lower Cambrian, which has led to the research and discovery of a major hiatus and diorite intrusion between this group and the Brand Group. Using Zircon U-Pb dating, a date is returned of 603±2 Ma, suggesting the intrusion is Lower Edicaran in age. This also caused the Brand Group to be taken out of the Charnian Surpergroup, making the Maplewell Group the youngest group within said supergroup.

== Dating ==
Zircon has also been found within two tuff samples collected from within the Beacon Hill Formation. The dates recovered for both of these samples were 566±3 Ma and 559±2 Ma, which showed the Beacon Hill Formation temporally correlates with the Trepassey Formation in Newfoundland and Labrador.

Another, more recent study collected more samples from the entire Charnian Supergroup, including samples from the Maplewell Group, which were taken from the oldest and youngest known parts of the group. The dates recovered from these samples were 569±1 Ma and 557±0 Ma respectively, refining the dates of the base and top of the group, which further showed that not only does the Maplewell Group correlate with the Trepassey Formation, but the upper layers are now known to overlap it.
