= Midlands Microcraton =

Block of late Neoproterozoic crust which underlies the Midlands region of England

The Midlands Microcraton is a triangular block of late Neoproterozoic crust of igneous and volcaniclastic origin, which underlies the Midlands region of England. Its northern tip is at the southern edge of the Peak District and its other two corners are in the vicinity of London and Swansea.

Though its north-eastern edge is obscured by Palaeozoic and Mesozoic strata, the north-western edge of the microcraton is clearly defined by the Welsh Borderland Fault System. To the south, it is bounded by the Variscan Orogen.
