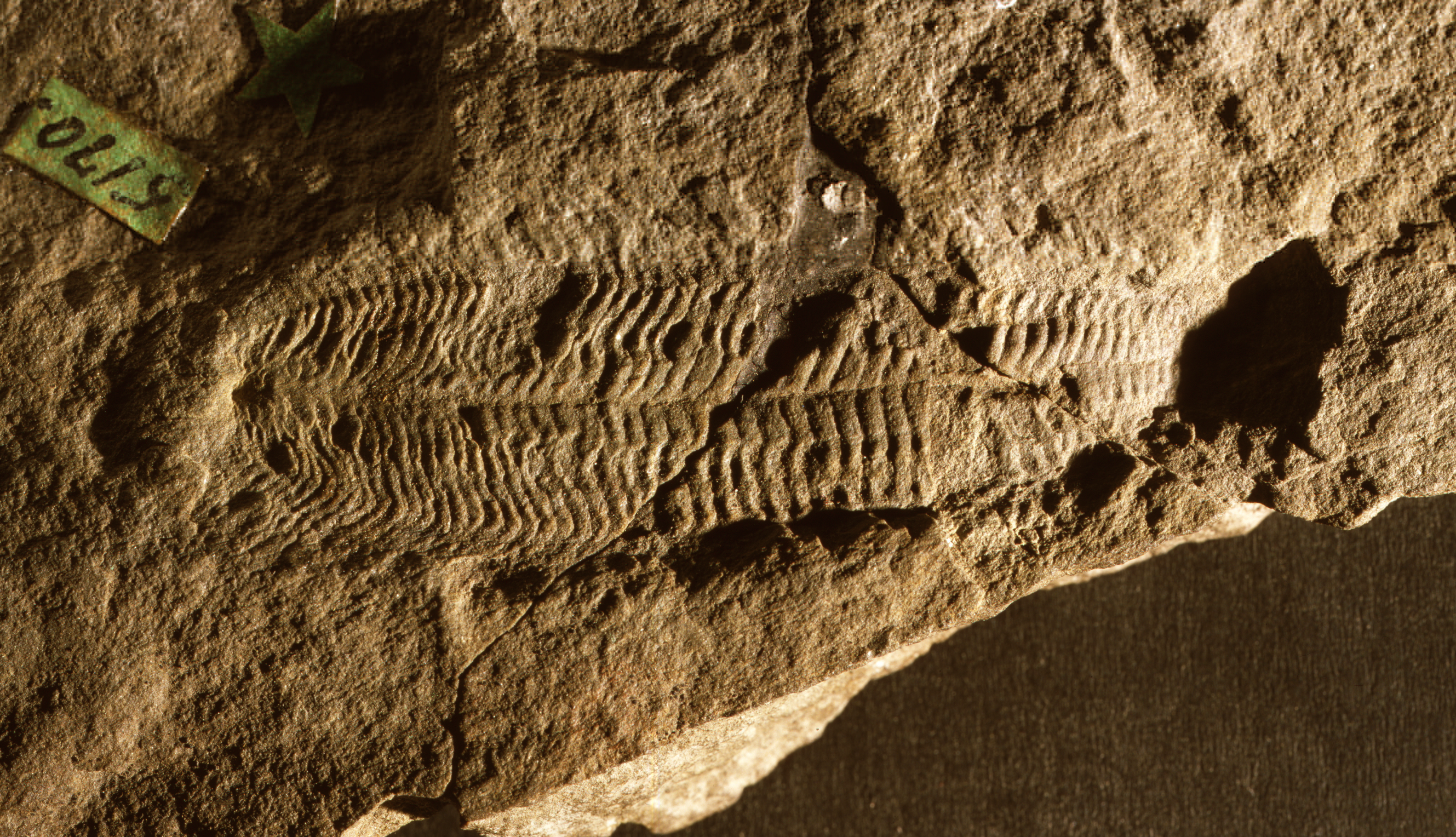
- Holotype specimen of Protonympha salicifolia from the Late Devonian (Frasnian) Gardeau Sandstone near Naples, New York
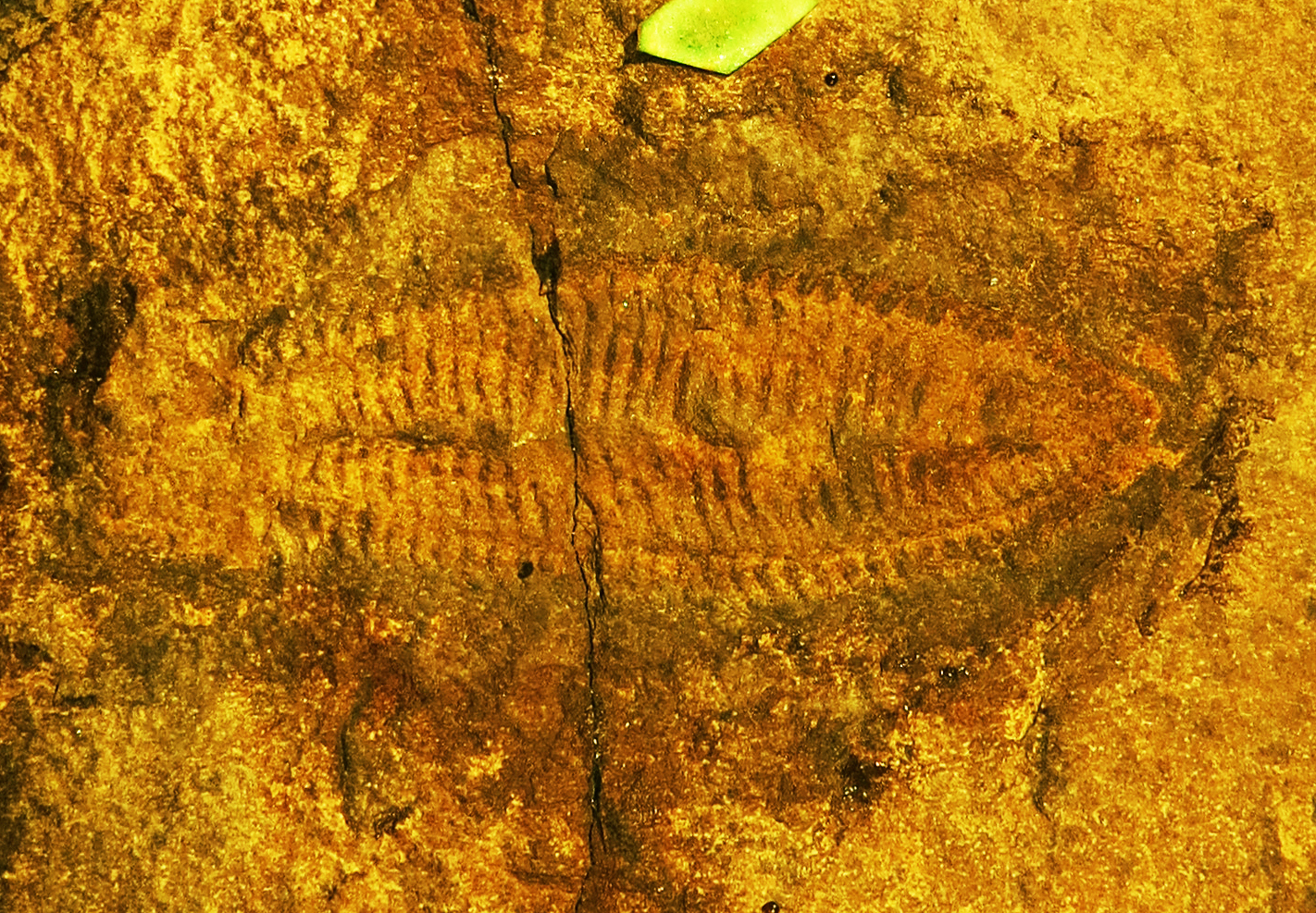
- Holotype specimen of Protonympha transversa from the Middle Devonian (Givetian) Moscow Formation near Summit, New York

Scientific classification
- Kingdom: Animalia
- Clade: Bilateria
- Genus: †Protonympha; Clarke 1903

Species
- Protonympha transversa; Protonympha salicifolia

= Protonympha =

Protonympha Temporal range: Devonian

Genus of animal

Protonympha is a form genus for problematic fossils of Devonian age in New York. It has been of special interest because of its morphological similarity with the iconic Ediacaran fossil Spriggina, and may have been a late surviving vendobiont.

== Description ==
Protonympha is a flat, quilted fossil, which has previously been compared with the arm of a starfish or an annelid worm, but lacks a segmented carapace or stereom. Its preservation in sandstone is similar to Ediacaran type preservations. A less-accepted hypothesis claims the organisms were terrestrial fossils like lichen, with hypothetically interpreted rhizoid-like extensions as possible evidence it may have lived on land or in shallow pools.
