= Ediacaran biota =

Life of the Ediacaran period

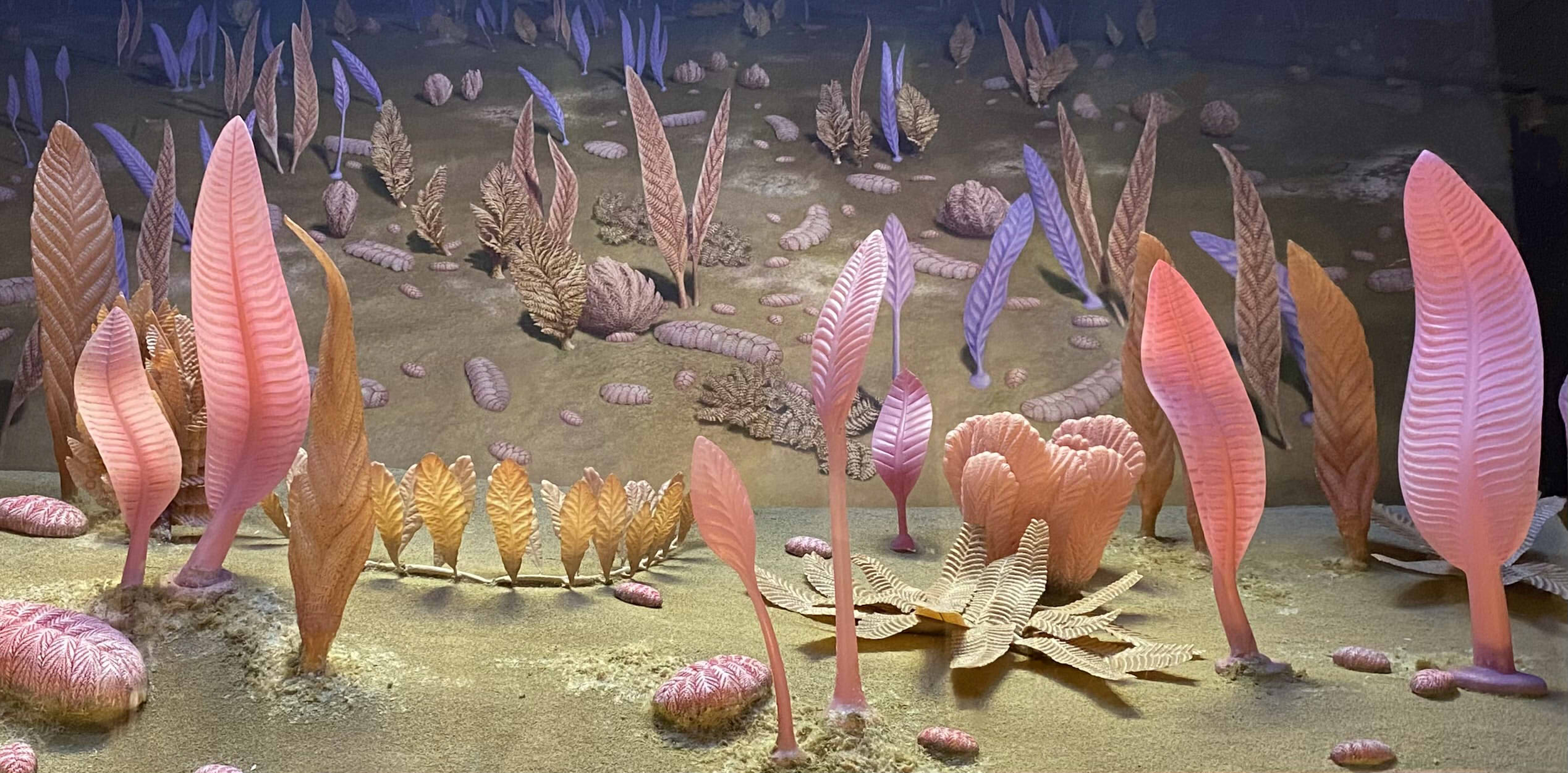
A diorama of the macroscopic organisms of the Avalon assemblage at the Smithsonian National Museum of Natural History.

The Ediacaran biota (/ˌiːdiˈækərən/ EE-dee-ACK-ər-ən; formerly Vendian) is a group of large, mostly soft-bodied, biologically complex Precambrian organisms that lived during the Ediacaran period (c. 635–538.8 Mya). These were mostly sessile or sedentary benthic organisms that inhabit the sea floor as filter feeders and substrate-grazing microbivores, with fractal or transflectional body plans. Three distinct assemblages of these organisms have been discovered, preserved as mold and trace fossils in Ediacaran sandstone, representing some of the earliest known complex multicellular organisms and the earliest diversification and speciation of prehistoric animals.

The Ediacaran biota first appeared around 600 million years ago and flourished until the cusp of the Cambrian period 538.8 million years ago, when the characteristic communities of fossils vanished. They may have undergone rapid biodiversification in a proposed evolutionary radiation event at around 575 million years ago, called the Avalon explosion. This was after the Earth had thawed from global glaciation during the preceding Cryogenian period, likely further fueled by the ongoing Neoproterozoic oxygenation event and the rock flour minerals released by the retreat of the Gaskiers glaciation. They largely disappeared after the Baykonurian glaciation in what is known as the End-Ediacaran extinction, and were eventually succeeded in the subsequent Cambrian period by the more motile eumetazoan animals in a much larger radiation event known as the Cambrian explosion.

The first recognized Ediacaran organism is a mold fossil of the petalonamid Charnia, discovered in the Charnwood Forest in Leicestershire, United Kingdom. A diverse Ediacaran community was discovered in 1995 in Sonora, Mexico, and is approximately 555 million years in age, roughly coeval with Ediacaran fossils of the Ediacara Hills in South Australia and the White Sea on the coast of Russia. While rare fossils that may represent survivors have been found as late as the Middle Cambrian (510–500 Mya), the earlier faunal communities disappear from the fossil record at the end of the Ediacaran, leaving only curious fragments of once-thriving ecosystems. Multiple hypotheses exist to explain the disappearance of this biota, including preservation bias, a changing environment, the advent of predators and competition from other life-forms. A sampling, reported in 2018, of late Ediacaran strata across the scattered remnants of Baltica (< 560 Mya) suggests the flourishing of the organisms coincided with conditions of low overall productivity with a very high percentage produced by bacteria, which may have led to high concentrations of dissolved organic material in the oceans.

Determining where Ediacaran organisms fit in the tree of life has proven challenging; it is not even established that most of them were animals, with suggestions that they were lichens (fungus-alga symbionts), algae, protists known as foraminifera, fungi or microbial colonies, or hypothetical intermediates between plants and animals. The morphology and habit of some taxa (e.g. Funisia dorothea) suggest relationships to Porifera or Cnidaria (e.g. Auroralumina). Kimberella may show a similarity to molluscs, and other organisms have been thought to possess bilateral symmetry, although this is controversial. Most macroscopic fossils are morphologically distinct from later life-forms: they resemble discs, tubes, mud-filled bags or quilted mattresses. Due to the difficulty of deducing evolutionary relationships among these organisms, some palaeontologists have suggested that these represent completely extinct lineages that do not resemble any living organism. Palaeontologist Adolf Seilacher proposed a separate subkingdom level category Vendozoa (now renamed Vendobionta) in the Linnaean hierarchy for the Ediacaran biota. If these enigmatic organisms left no descendants, their strange forms might be seen as a "failed experiment" in multicellular life, with later multicellular life evolving independently from unrelated single-celled organisms. A 2018 study confirmed that one of the period's most-prominent and iconic fossils, Dickinsonia, included cholesterol, suggesting affinities to animals, fungi, or red algae.

The Ediacara biota in context
← / Last Ediacaran communities; ← / Last putative Ediacaran; ← / Embryos?; ← / Last extensive glaciation; ← / First Ediacaran megafossil; ← / Gaskiers glaciation; ← / Avalon explosion
Neoproterozoic (last era of the Precambrian); Palaeozoic (first era of the Phanerozoic)
Axis scale: million years References: Waggoner (1998), Hofmann, Narbonne, & Aitken (1990)

== History ==
Life timeline
← / Earth formed; ← / Earliest water; ← / LUCA; ← / Earliest fossils; ← / Great Oxygenation Event; ← / Sexual reproduction; ← / Earliest fungi; ← / Neoproterozoic oxygenation event; ← / Ediacaran biota; ← / Cambrian explosion; ← / Earliest tetrapods; ← / Earliest hominoid
(million years ago)

The first Ediacaran fossils discovered were the disc-shaped Aspidella terranovica in 1868. Their discoverer, Scottish geologist Alexander Murray, found them useful aids for correlating the age of rocks around Newfoundland. However, since they lay below the "Primordial Strata" of the Cambrian that was then thought to contain the very first signs of animal life, a proposal four years after their discovery by Elkanah Billings that these simple forms represented fauna was dismissed by his peers. Instead, they were interpreted as gas escape structures or inorganic concretions. No similar structures elsewhere in the world were then known and the one-sided debate soon fell into obscurity. In 1933, Georg Gürich discovered specimens in Namibia but assigned them to the Cambrian Period. In 1946, Reg Sprigg noticed "jellyfishes" in the Ediacara Hills of Australia's Flinders Ranges, which were at the time believed to be Early Cambrian.

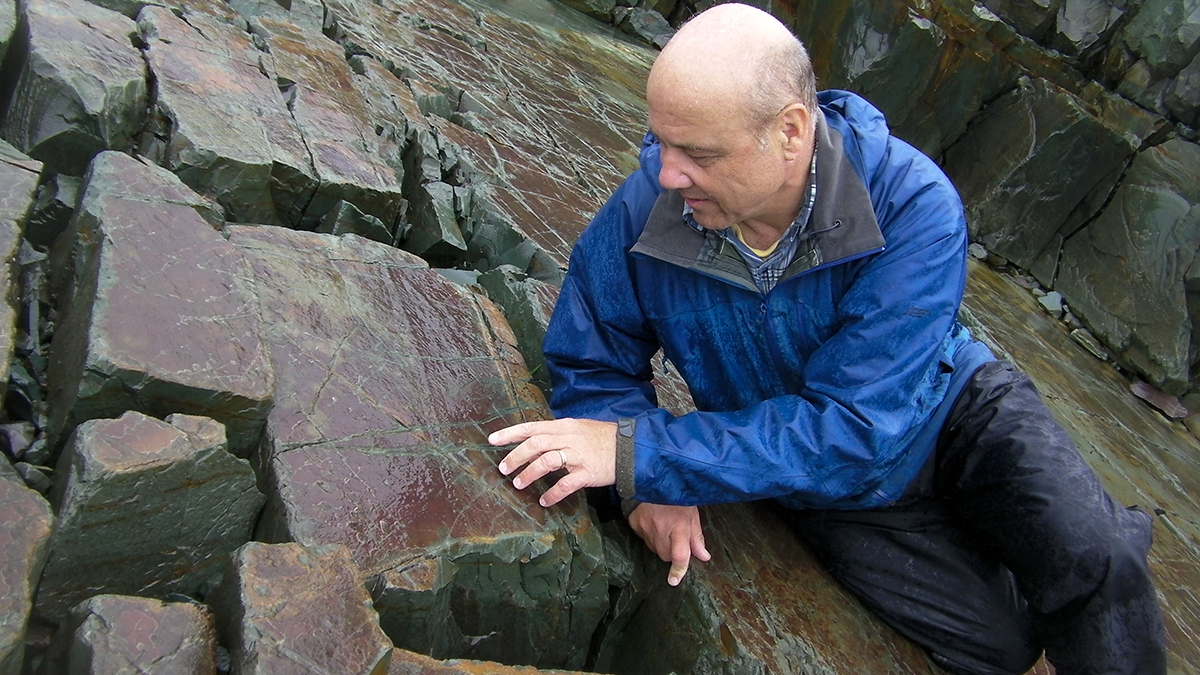
Palaeontologist Guy Narbonne examining Ediacaran fossils in Newfoundland

It was not until the British discovery of the iconic Charnia that the Precambrian was seriously considered as containing life. This frond-shaped mold fossil was first found in 1956 in England's Charnwood Forest by a 15 year-old girl Tina Negus, who spotted the fossil among slabs of turbidites during a family trip and suspected it to be Precambrian, but her claim was rebuffed by her teacher, who rejected her stone rubbing and refused to believe the possibility of Precambrian life. (Note: "In April 1957, I went rock-climbing in Charnwood Forest with two friends, Richard Allen and Richard Blachford ('Blach'), fellow students at Wyggeston Grammar School, Leicester. I was already interested in geology and knew that the rocks of the Charnian Supergroup were Precambrian although I had not heard of the Australian fossils. Richard Allen and I agree that Blach (who died in the early 1960s) drew my attention to the leaf-like fossil holotype now on display in Leicester City Museum. I took a rubbing and showed it to my father, who was Minister of the Great Meeting Unitarian Chapel in East Bond Street, taught part-time at University College (soon to be Leicester University) and thus knew Trevor Ford. We took Trevor to visit the fossil site and convinced him that it was a genuine fossil. His publication of the discovery in the Journal of the Yorkshire Geological Society established the genus Charnia and aroused worldwide interest. ... I was able to report the discovery because of my father's encouragement and the enquiring approach fostered by my science teachers. Tina Negus saw the frond before I did but no one took her seriously.") The same specimen was spotted again the next year in 1957 by a group of three schoolboys, among whom was a 15 year-old Roger Mason, whose father connected him to geologist Trevor D. Ford at University of Leicester and had the fossil extracted for display at the New Walk Museum and Art Gallery. Due to the detailed geological mapping of the British Geological Survey, there was no doubt these fossils sat in Precambrian rocks. Palaeontologist Martin Glaessner finally, in 1959, made the connection between this and the earlier finds and with a combination of improved dating of existing specimens and an injection of vigour into the search, many more instances were recognised.

All specimens discovered until 1967 were in coarse-grained sandstone that prevented preservation of fine details, making interpretation difficult. S.B. Misra's discovery of fossiliferous ash-beds at the Mistaken Point assemblage in Newfoundland changed all this as the delicate detail preserved by the fine ash allowed the description of features that were previously undiscernible. It was also the first discovery of Ediacarans in deep water sediments.

Poor communication, combined with the difficulty in correlating globally distinct formations, led to a plethora of different names for the biota. In 1960 the French name "Ediacarien" – after the Ediacara Hills – was added to the competing terms "Sinian" and "Vendian" for terminal-Precambrian rocks, and these names were also applied to the life-forms. "Ediacaran" and "Ediacarian" were subsequently applied to the epoch or period of geological time and its corresponding rocks. In March 2004, the International Union of Geological Sciences ended the inconsistency by formally naming the terminal period of the Neoproterozoic after the Australian locality.

The term "Ediacaran biota" and similar ("Ediacara" / "Ediacaran" / "Ediacarian" / "Vendian" and "fauna" / "biota") has, at various times, been used in a geographic, stratigraphic, taphonomic, or biological sense, with the latter the most common in modern literature.

== Preservation ==
=== Microbial mats ===
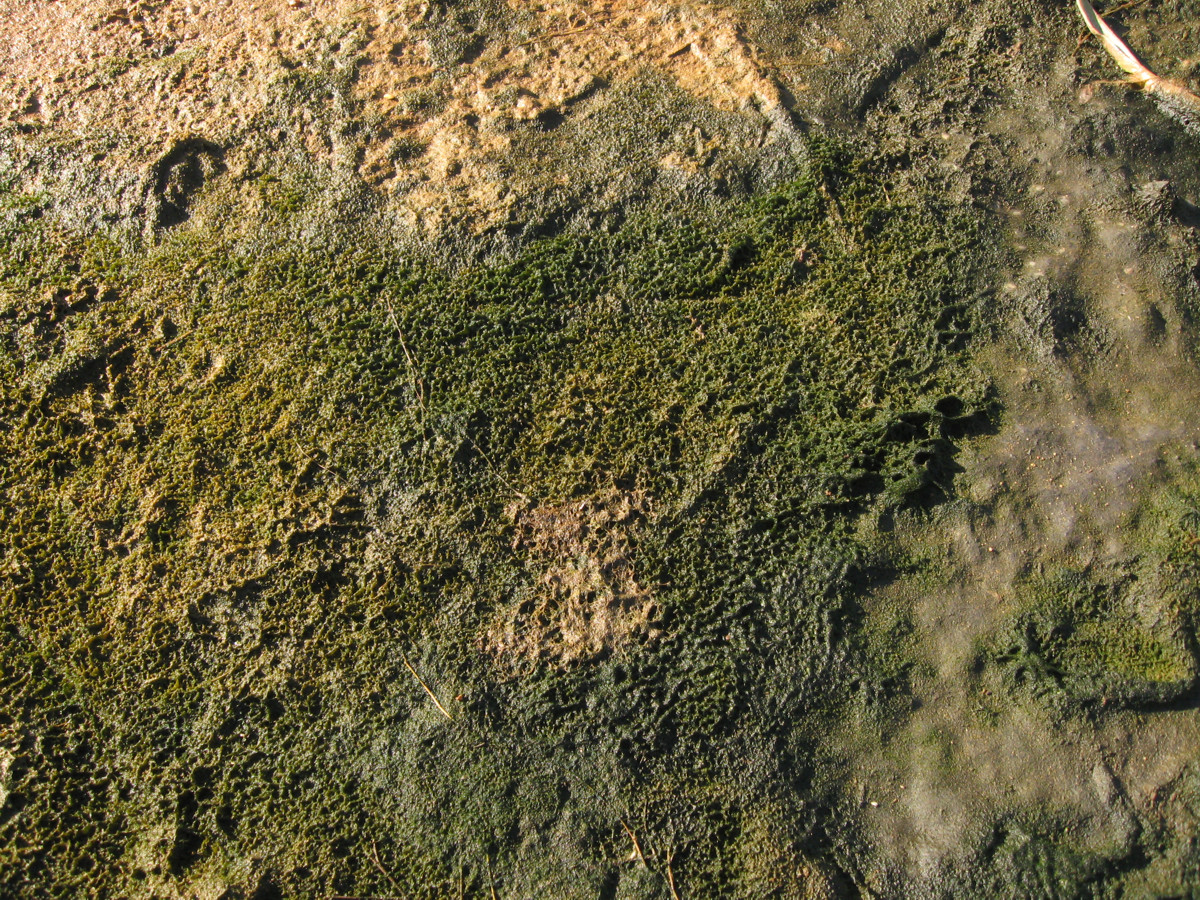
Modern cyanobacterial-algal mat, salty lake on the White Sea seaside

Microbial mats are areas of sediment stabilised by the presence of colonies of microbes that secrete sticky fluids or otherwise bind the sediment particles. They appear to migrate upwards when covered by a thin layer of sediment but this is an illusion caused by the colony's growth; individuals do not, themselves, move. If too thick a layer of sediment is deposited before they can grow or reproduce through it, parts of the colony will die leaving behind fossils with a characteristically wrinkled ("elephant skin") and tubercular texture.

Some Ediacaran strata with the texture characteristics of microbial mats contain fossils, and Ediacaran fossils are almost always found in beds that contain these microbial mats. Although microbial mats were once widespread before the Cambrian substrate revolution, the evolution of grazing organisms vastly reduced their numbers. These communities are now limited to inhospitable refugia, such as the stromatolites found in Hamelin Pool Marine Nature Reserve in Shark Bay, Western Australia, where the salt levels can be twice those of the surrounding sea.

=== Fossilization ===
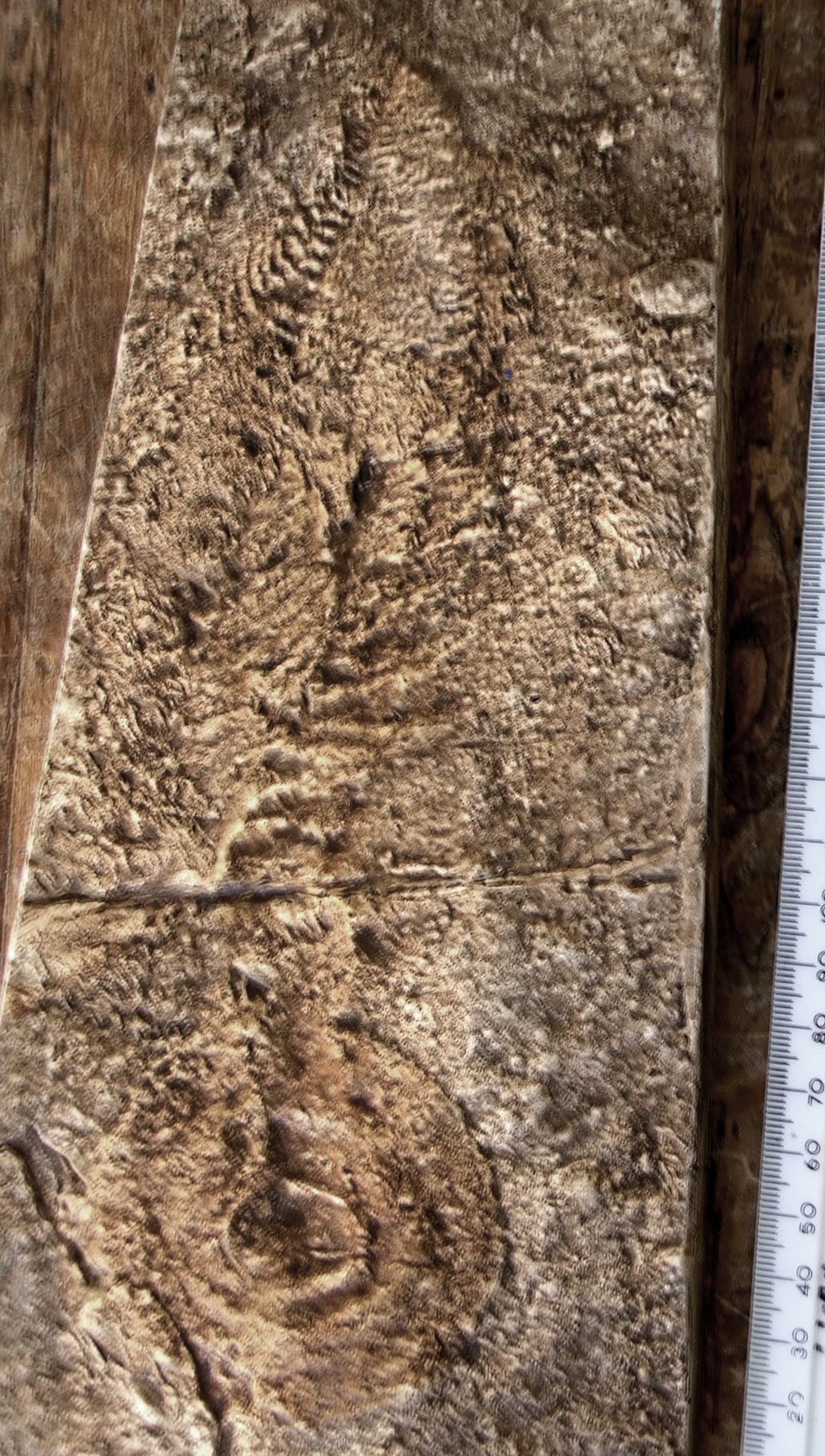
The fossil Charniodiscus is barely distinguishable from the "elephant skin" texture on this cast.

The preservation of Ediacaran fossils is of interest, since as soft-bodied organisms they would normally not fossilize. Further, unlike later soft-bodied fossil biota such as the Burgess Shale or Solnhofen Limestone, the Ediacaran biota is not found in a restricted environment subject to unusual local conditions: they are global. The processes that were operating must therefore have been systemic and worldwide. Something about the Ediacaran Period permitted these delicate creatures to be left behind; the fossils may have been preserved by virtue of rapid covering by ash or sand, trapping them against the mud or microbial mats on which they lived. Their preservation was possibly enhanced by the high concentration of silica in the oceans before silica-secreting organisms such as sponges and diatoms became prevalent. Ash beds provide more detail and can readily be dated to the nearest million years or better using radiometric dating. However, it is more common to find Ediacaran fossils under sandy beds deposited by storms or in turbidites formed by high-energy bottom-scraping ocean currents. Soft-bodied organisms today rarely fossilize during such events, but the presence of widespread microbial mats probably aided preservation by stabilising their impressions in the sediment below.

=== Scale of preservation ===
The rate of cementation of the overlying substrate relative to the rate of decomposition of the organism determines whether the top or bottom surface of an organism is preserved. Most disc-shaped fossils decomposed before the overlying sediment was cemented, whereupon ash or sand slumped in to fill the void, leaving a cast of the organism's underside. Conversely, quilted fossils tended to decompose after the cementation of the overlying sediment; hence their upper surfaces are preserved. Their more resistant nature is reflected in the fact that, in rare occasions, quilted fossils are found within storm beds as the high-energy sedimentation did not destroy them as it would have the less-resistant discs. Further, in some cases, the bacterial precipitation of minerals formed a "death mask", ultimately leaving a positive, cast-like impression of the organism.

== Morphology ==
Forms of Ediacaran fossil
The earliest discovered potential embryo, preserved within an acanthomorphic acritarch. The term 'acritarch' describes a range of unclassified cell-like fossils.	The earliest discovered potential embryo, preserved within an acanthomorphic acritarch.
Tateana inflata ('Cyclomedusa' radiata) were originally believed to have been Medusoids, although recent research suggests that they were holdfasts of Petalonamids.	Tateana inflata (= 'Cyclomedusa' radiata) is attachment disk of unknown organism
A cast of Charnia, the first accepted complex Precambrian organism. Charnia was once interpreted as a relative of the sea pens.	A cast of Charnia
Dickinsonia displays the characteristic quilted appearance of Ediacaran enigmata.	A cast of Dickinsonia
Spriggina was originally interpreted as annelid or arthropod. However, lack of known limbs, and glide reflected isomers instead of true segments, rejects any such classification despite some superficial resemblance.	Spriggina may be one of the predators that led to the demise of the Ediacaran fauna
Late Ediacaran Archaeonassa-type trace fossils are commonly preserved on the top surfaces of sandstone strata.	Late Ediacaran Archaeonassa-type trace fossils are commonly preserved on the top surfaces of sandstone strata
Epibaion waggoneris, chain of trace platforms and the imprint of the body of Yorgia waggoneri (right), which created these traces on microbial mat.	Yorgia chain of trace platforms terminate by the body of the animal (right).

The Ediacaran biota exhibited a vast range of morphological characteristics. Size ranged from millimetres to metres; complexity from "blob-like" to intricate; rigidity from sturdy and resistant to jelly-soft. Almost all forms of symmetry were present. These organisms differed from earlier, mainly microbial, fossils in having an organised, differentiated multicellular construction and centimetre-plus sizes.

These disparate morphologies can be broadly grouped into form taxa:

"Embryos"
Recent discoveries of Precambrian multicellular life have been dominated by reports of embryos, particularly from the Doushantuo Formation in China. Some finds generated intense media excitement though some have claimed they are instead inorganic structures formed by the precipitation of minerals on the inside of a hole. Other "embryos" have been interpreted as the remains of the giant sulfur-reducing bacteria akin to Thiomargarita, a view that, while it had enjoyed a notable gain of supporters as of 2007, has since suffered following further research comparing the potential Doushantuo embryos' morphologies with those of Thiomargarita specimens, both living and in various stages of decay. A recent discovery of comparable Ediacaran fossil embryos from the Portfjeld Formation in Greenland has significantly expanded the paleogeographical occurrence of Doushantuo-type fossil "embryos" with similar biotic forms now reported from differing paleolatitudes.
Microfossils dating from 632.5 million years ago – just 3 million years after the end of the Cryogenian glaciations – may represent embryonic 'resting stages' in the life cycle of the earliest known animals. An alternative proposal is that these structures represent adult stages of the multicellular organisms of this period. Microfossils of Caveasphaera are thought to foreshadow the evolutionary origin of animal-like embryology.

Discs
Circular fossils, such as Ediacaria, Cyclomedusa, and Rugoconites led to the initial identification of Ediacaran fossils as cnidaria, which include jellyfish and corals. Further examination has provided alternative interpretations of all disc-shaped fossils: not one is now confidently recognised as a jellyfish. Alternate explanations include holdfasts and protists; the patterns displayed where two meet have led to many 'individuals' being identified as microbial colonies, and yet others may represent scratch marks formed as stalked organisms spun around their holdfasts.

Bags
Fossils such as Pteridinium preserved within sediment layers resemble "mud-filled bags". The scientific community is a long way from reaching a consensus on their interpretation.

Toroids
The fossil Vendoglossa tuberculata from the Nama Group, Namibia, has been interpreted as a dorso-ventrally compressed stem-group metazoan, with a large gut cavity and a transversely ridged ectoderm. The organism is in the shape of a flattened torus, with the long axis of its toroidal body running through the approximate center of the presumed gut cavity.

Quilted organisms
The organisms considered in Seilacher's revised definition of the Vendobionta share a "quilted" appearance and resembled an inflatable mattress. Sometimes these quilts would be torn or ruptured prior to preservation: Such damaged specimens provide valuable clues in the reconstruction process. For example, the three (or more) petaloid fronds of Swartpuntia germsi could only be recognised in a posthumously damaged specimen – usually multiple fronds were hidden as burial squashed the organisms flat. These organisms appear to form two groups: the fractal rangeomorphs and the simpler erniettomorphs. Including such fossils as the iconic Charnia and Swartpuntia, the group is both the most iconic of the Ediacaran biota and the most difficult to place within the existing tree of life. Lacking any mouth, gut, reproductive organs, or indeed any evidence of internal anatomy, their lifestyle was somewhat peculiar by modern standards; the most widely accepted hypothesis holds that they sucked nutrients out of the surrounding seawater by osmotrophy or osmosis. However, others argue against this.

Non-Vendobionts

Possible early forms of living phyla, excluding them from some definitions of the Ediacaran biota. The earliest such fossil is the reputed bilaterian Vernanimalcula claimed by some, however, to represent the infilling of an egg-sac or acritarch. In 2020, Ikaria wariootia was claimed to represent one of the oldest organisms with anterior and posterior differentiation. Later examples are almost universally accepted as bilaterians and include the mollusc-like Kimberella, Spriggina (pictured) and the shield-shaped Parvancorina, whose affinities are currently debated. A suite of fossils known as the small shelly fossils are represented in the Ediacaran, most famously by Cloudina, a shelly tube-like fossil that often shows evidence of predatory boring, suggesting that, while predation may not have been common in the Ediacaran Period, it was at least present. Organic microfossils known as small carbonaceous fossils are found in Ediacaran sediments, including the spiral-shaped Cochleatina which spans the Ediacaran–Cambrian boundary. Ediacaria also survived well into the Cambrian. Representatives of modern taxa existed in the Ediacaran, some of which are recognisable today. Sponges, red and green algæ, protists and bacteria are all easily recognisable with some pre-dating the Ediacaran by nearly three billion years. Possible arthropods have also been described. Surface trails left by Treptichnus bear similarities to modern priapulids. Fossils of the hard-shelled foraminifera Platysolenites are known from the latest Ediacaran of western Siberia, coexisting with Cloudina and Namacalathus.

Filaments
Filament-shaped structures in Precambrian fossils have been observed on many occasions. Frondose fossils in Newfoundland have been observed to have developed filamentous bedding planes, inferred to be stolonic outgrowths. A study of Brazilian Ediacaran fossils found filamentous microfossils, suggested to be eukaryotes or large sulfur-oxidizing-bacteria (SOBs). Fungus-like filaments found in the Doushantuo Formation have been interpreted as eukaryotes and possibly fungi, providing possible evidence for the evolution and terrestrialization of fungi ~635 Ma.

Trace fossils
With the exception of some very simple vertical burrows the only Ediacaran burrows are horizontal, lying on or just below the surface of the seafloor. Such burrows have been taken to imply the presence of motile organisms with heads, which would probably have had a bilateral symmetry. This could place them in the bilateral clade of animals but they could also have been made by simpler organisms feeding as they slowly rolled along the sea floor. Putative "burrows" dating as far back as 1,100 million years may have been made by animals that fed on the undersides of microbial mats, which would have shielded them from a chemically unpleasant ocean; however their uneven width and tapering ends make a biological origin so difficult to defend that even the original proponent no longer believes they are authentic.

The burrows observed imply simple behaviour, and the complex efficient feeding traces common from the start of the Cambrian are absent. Some Ediacaran fossils, especially discs, have been interpreted tentatively as trace fossils but this hypothesis has not gained widespread acceptance. As well as burrows, some trace fossils have been found directly associated with an Ediacaran fossil. Yorgia and Dickinsonia are often found at the end of long pathways of trace fossils matching their shape; these fossils are thought to be associated with ciliary feeding but the precise method of formation of these disconnected and overlapping fossils largely remains a mystery. The potential mollusc Kimberella is associated with scratch marks, perhaps formed by a radula.

Trajectory analyses of locomotory trace fossils suggest that early motile tracemakers were relatively short-bodied, commonly exhibiting ovoid body forms, whereas later forms show a gradual increase in body elongation, reaching at least eight times their body width by the terminal Ediacaran. This higher body aspect ratio increases the linear smoothness of the trajectories, with more continuous derivatives. The trajectories also exhibit denser and denser loops with higher navigational accuracy,and this is the reflection of evolution of sensation, with deduced effective sensory ranges increasing markedly around 540 Ma, from millimetric and centimetric scale to decimetric scale.

== Assemblages ==
Late Ediacaran macrofossils are recognized globally in at least 52 formations and a variety of depositional conditions. Each formation is commonly grouped into three main types, known as assemblages and named after typical localities. Each assemblage tends to occupy its own time period and region of morphospace, and after an initial burst of diversification (or extinction) changes little for the rest of its existence.

Late Ediacaran Assemblages
← / Second pulse of the end-Ediacaran extinction; ← / ~Baykonurian glaciation; ← / First pulse of the end-Ediacaran extinction; ← / Avalon Explosion; ← / Shuram excursion reaches its peak
Major Glacial period; Shuram excursion
Stratigraphic scale of the ICS subdivisions and Ediacaran biotic assmblages Vertical axis scale: millions of years ago

=== Avalon assemblage ===
The Avalon assemblage is defined at Mistaken Point one the Avalon Peninsula of Canada, the oldest locality with a large quantity of Ediacaran fossils. The assemblage is easily dated because it contains many fine ash-beds, which are a good source of zircons used in the uranium-lead method of radiometric dating. These fine-grained ash beds also preserve exquisite detail. Constituents of this biota appear to survive through until the extinction of all Ediacarans at the base of the Cambrian.

One interpretation of the biota is as deep-sea-dwelling rangeomorphs such as Charnia, all of which share a fractal growth pattern. They were probably preserved in situ (without post-mortem transportation), although this point is not universally accepted. The assemblage, while less diverse than the White Sea or Nama assemblages, resembles Carboniferous suspension-feeding communities, which may suggest filter feeding as the assemblage is often found in water too deep for photosynthesis.

=== White Sea assemblage ===
The White Sea or Ediacaran assemblage is named after Russia's White Sea or Australia's Ediacara Hills and is marked by much higher diversity than the Avalon or Nama assemblages. Most fossils are preserved as imprints in microbial beds, but a few are preserved within sandy units.

In Australia, they are typically found in red gypsiferous and calcareous paleosols formed on loess and flood deposits in an arid cool temperate paleoclimate. Since the early 2000s, around 40 fossil surfaces preserving organisms from the White Sea Assemblage have been excavated from the Ediacara Member of the Rawnsley Quartzite in the Ediacara Hills, which lie within the Nilpena Ediacara National Park, west of the Flinders Ranges in South Australia. The fossil bed known as 1T-F has the highest diversity of Ediacaran fossils found so far, which also show significant ecological complexity. The bed includes more than 400 fossils across 16 genera.

=== Nama assemblage ===
The Nama assemblage is best represented in Namibia. It is marked by extreme biotic turnover, with rates of extinction exceeding rates of origination for the whole period. Three-dimensional preservation is most common, with organisms preserved in sandy beds containing internal bedding. Dima Grazhdankin believes that these fossils represent burrowing organisms, while Guy Narbonne maintains they were surface dwellers. These beds are sandwiched between units comprising interbedded sandstones, siltstones and shales—with microbial mats, where present, usually containing the fossils. The environment is interpreted as sand bars formed at the mouth of a delta's distributaries. Mattress-like vendobionts (Ernietta, Pteridinium, Rangea) in these sandstones form a very different assemblage from vermiform fossils (Cloudina, Namacalathus) of Ediacaran "wormworld" in marine dolomite of Namibia.

=== Significance of assemblages ===
Since they are globally distributed – described on all continents except Antarctica – geographical boundaries do not appear to be a factor; the same fossils are found at all palaeolatitudes (the latitude where the fossil was created, accounting for continental drift - an application of paleomagnetism) and in separate sedimentary basins. An analysis of one of the White Sea fossil beds, where the layers cycle from continental seabed to inter-tidal to estuarine and back again a few times, found that a specific set of Ediacaran organisms was associated with each environment. However, while there is some delineation in organisms adapted to different environments, the three assemblages are more distinct temporally than paleoenvironmentally. Because of this, the three assemblages are often separated by temporal boundaries rather than environmental ones (timeline at right).

As the Ediacaran biota represent an early stage in multicellular life's history, it is unsurprising that not all possible modes of life are occupied. It has been estimated that of 92 potentially possible modes of life – combinations of feeding style, tiering and motility — no more than a dozen are occupied by the end of the Ediacaran. Just four are represented in the Avalon assemblage.

== Classification and interpretation ==
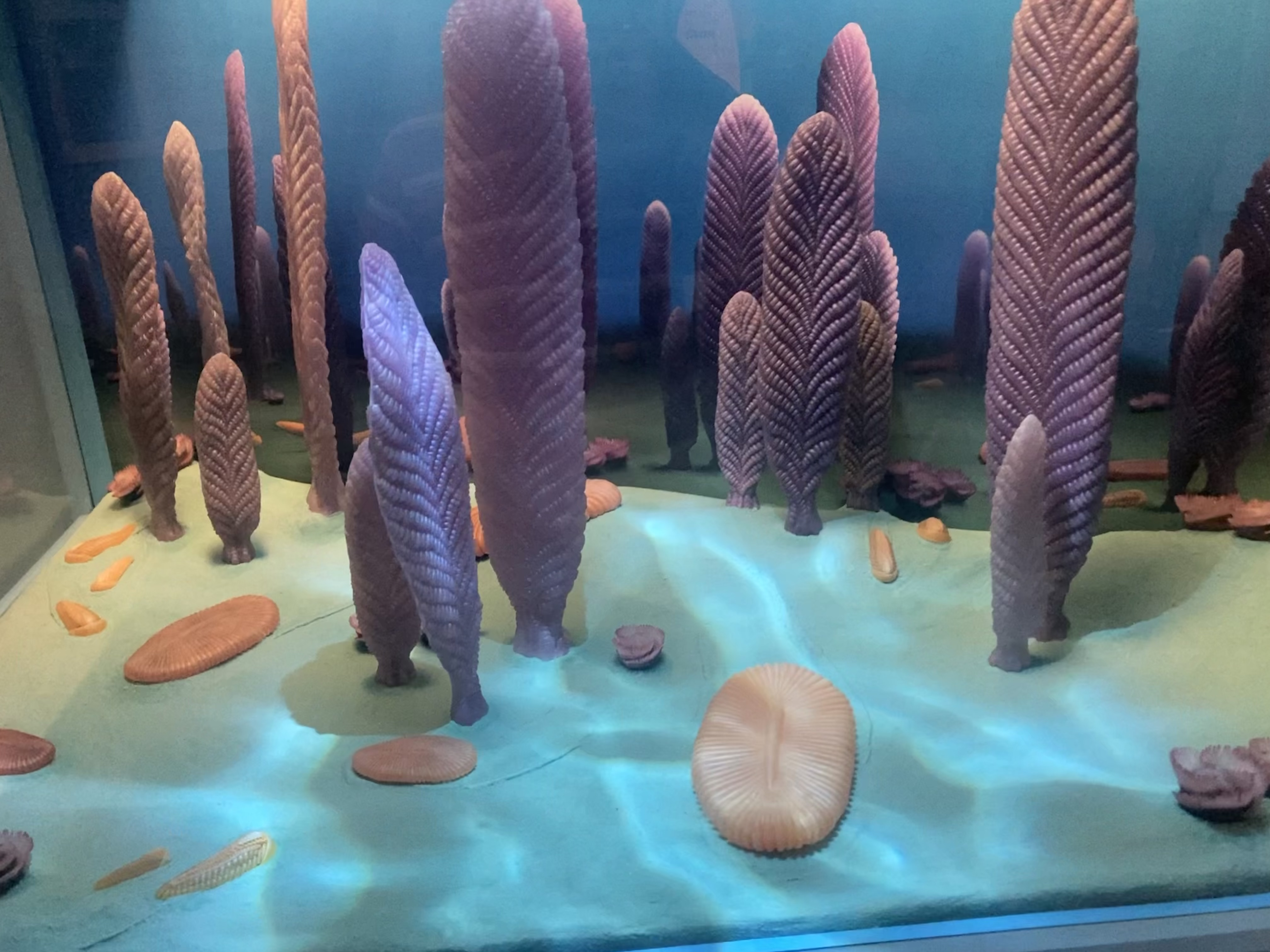
A reconstruction of the Ediacaran biota at the Field Museum in Chicago

Classification of the Ediacarans is inevitably difficult, hence a variety of theories exist as to their placement on the tree of life.

Martin Glaessner proposed in The Dawn of Animal Life (1984) that the Ediacaran biota were recognizable crown group members of modern phyla, but were unfamiliar because they had yet to evolve the characteristic features we use in modern classification.

In 1998 Mark McMenamin claimed Ediacarans did not possess an embryonic stage, and thus could not be animals. He believed that they independently evolved a nervous system and brains, meaning that "the path toward intelligent life was embarked upon more than once on this planet".

In 2018 analysis of ancient sterols was taken as evidence that one of the period's most-prominent and iconic fossils, Dickinsonia, was an early animal.

The term "Ediacara biota" has received criticism from some scientists due to its alleged inconsistency, arbitrary exclusion of certain fossils, and inability to be precisely defined.

=== Cnidarians ===
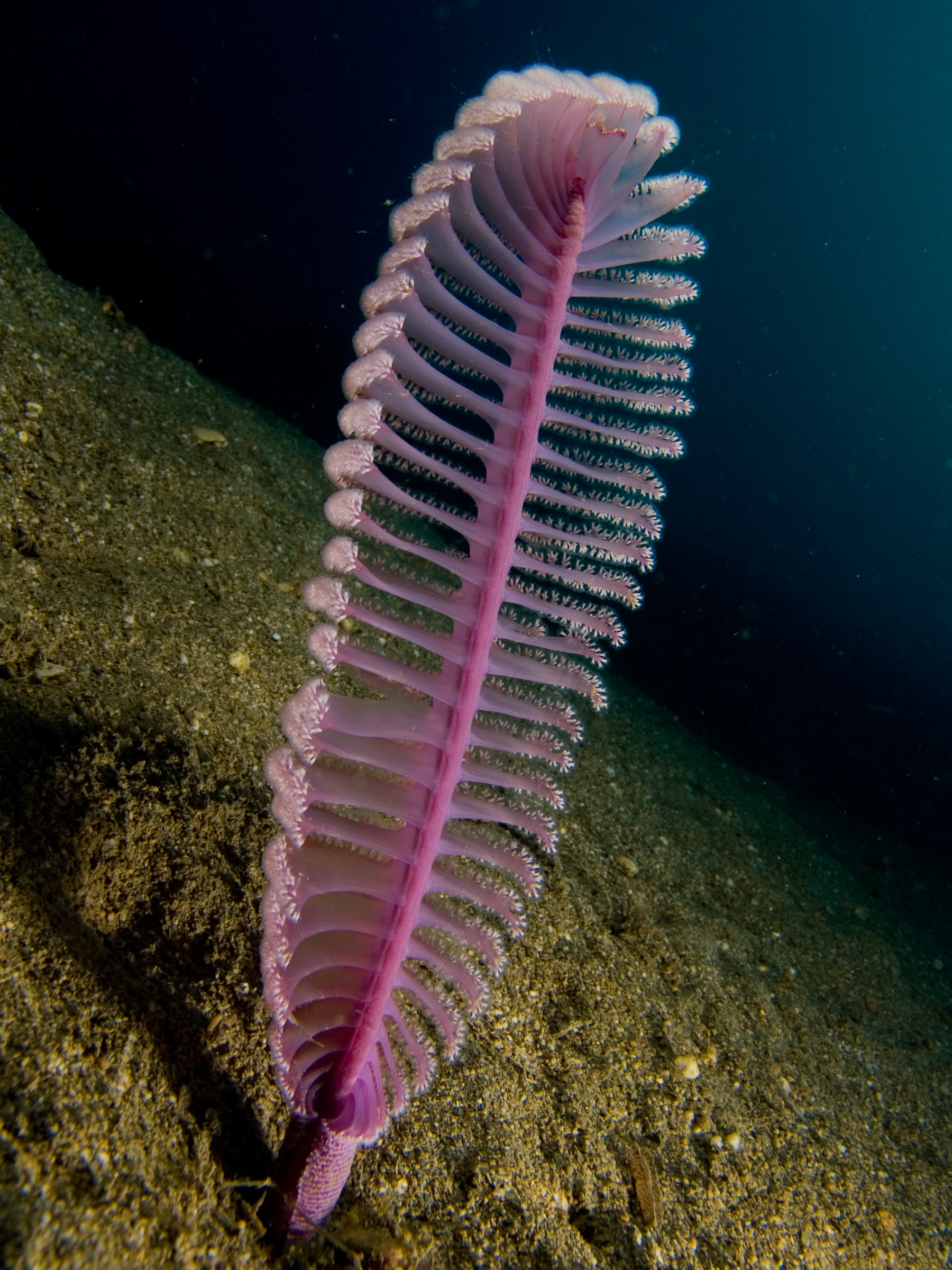
A sea pen, a modern cnidarian bearing a passing resemblance to Charnia

Since the most primitive eumetazoans—multi-cellular animals with tissues—are cnidarians, and the first recognized Ediacaran fossil Charnia looks very much like a sea pen, the first attempt to categorise these fossils designated them as jellyfish and sea pens. However, more recent discoveries have established that many of the circular forms formerly considered "cnidarian medusa" are actually holdfasts – sand-filled vesicles occurring at the base of the stem of upright frond-like Ediacarans. A notable example is the form known as Charniodiscus, a circular impression later found to be attached to the long 'stem' of a frond-like organism that now bears the name.

The link between frond-like Ediacarans and sea pens has been thrown into doubt by multiple lines of evidence; chiefly the derived nature of the most frond-like pennatulacean octocorals, their absence from the fossil record before the Cenozoic, and the apparent cohesion between segments in Ediacaran frond-like organisms. Some researchers have suggested that an analysis of "growth poles" discredits the pennatulacean nature of Ediacaran fronds.

=== Protozoans ===
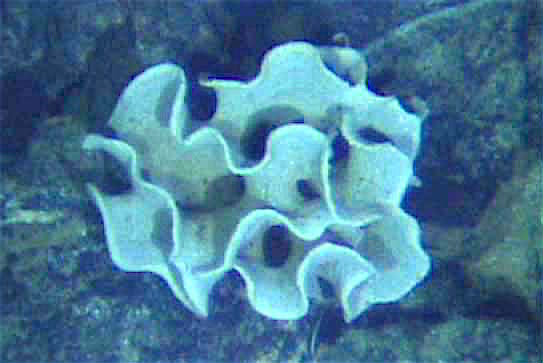
A single-celled xenophyophore in the Galapagos Rift

Adolf Seilacher has suggested that in the Ediacaran, animals take over from giant protists as the dominant life form. The modern xenophyophores are giant single-celled protozoans found throughout the world's oceans, largely on the abyssal plain. Genomic evidence suggests that the xenophyophores are a specialised group of Foraminifera.

=== Unique phyla ===
Seilacher has suggested that the Ediacaran organisms represented a unique and extinct grouping of related forms descended from a common ancestor (clade) and created the kingdom Vendozoa, named after the now-obsolete Vendian era. He later excluded fossils identified as metazoans and relaunched the phylum "Vendobionta", which he described as "quilted" cnidarians lacking stinging cells. This absence precludes the current cnidarian method of feeding, so Seilacher suggested that the organisms may have survived by symbiosis with photosynthetic or chemoautotrophic organisms. Mark McMenamin saw such feeding strategies as characteristic for the entire biota, and referred to the marine biota of this period as a "Garden of Ediacara".

=== Lichen hypothesis ===
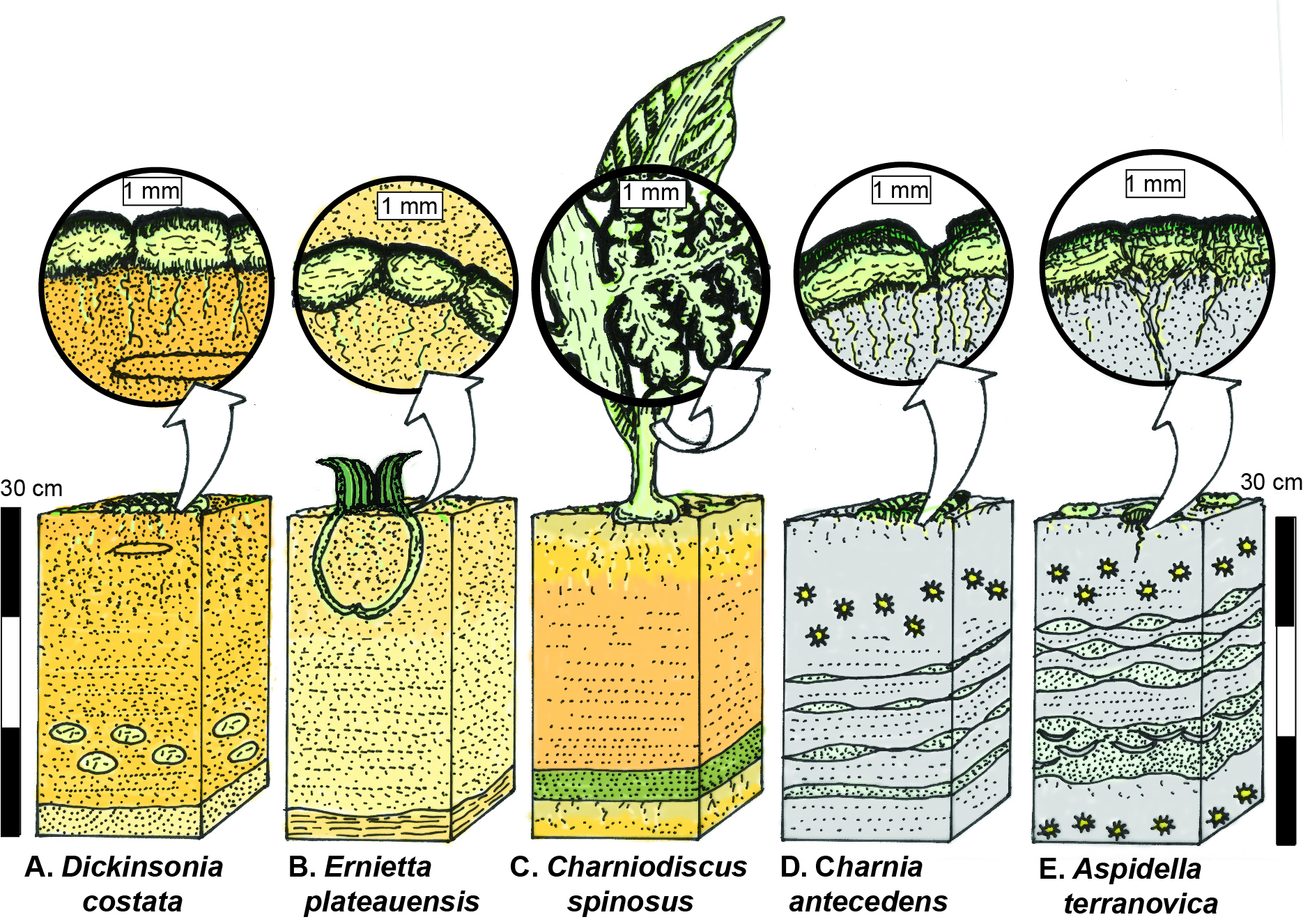
Greg Retallack's analysis of thin sections and substrates of a variety of Ediacaran fossils. His findings have been disputed by other scientists.

Greg Retallack has proposed that Ediacaran organisms were lichens. He argues that thin sections of Ediacaran fossils show lichen-like compartments and hypha-like wisps of ferruginized clay, and that Ediacaran fossils have been found in strata that he interprets as desert soils.

The suggestion has been disputed by other scientists; some have described the evidence as ambiguous and unconvincing, for instance noting that Dickinsonia fossils have been found on rippled surfaces (suggesting a marine environment), while trace fossils like Radulichnus could not have been caused by needle ice as Retallack has proposed. Ben Waggoner notes that the suggestion would place the root of the Cnidaria back from around 900 mya to between 1500 mya and 2000 mya, contradicting much other evidence. Matthew Nelsen, examining phylogenies of ascomycete fungi and chlorophyte algae (components of lichens), calibrated for time, finds no support for the hypothesis that lichens predated the vascular plants.

=== Other interpretations ===
Several classifications have been used to accommodate the Ediacaran biota at some point, from algae, to protozoans, to fungi to bacterial or microbial colonies, to hypothetical intermediates between plants and animals.

A new extant genus discovered in 2014, Dendrogramma, which at the time of discovery appeared to be a basal metazoan but of unknown taxonomic placement, had been noted to have similarities with the Ediacaran fauna. It has since been found to be a siphonophore, possibly even sections of a more complex species.

== Evolution ==
It took almost 4 billion years from the formation of the Earth for Ediacaran fossils to first appear, 655 million years ago. While putative fossils are reported from 3,460 million years ago, the first uncontroversial evidence for life is found 2,700 million years ago, and cells with nuclei certainly existed by 1,200 million years ago.

It could be that no special explanation is required: the slow process of evolution simply required 4 billion years to accumulate the necessary adaptations —though recent discoveries indicate that organismal complexity has increased exponentially over time. Indeed, there does seem to be a slow increase in the maximum level of complexity seen over this time, with more and more complex forms of life evolving as time progresses, with traces of earlier semi-complex life such as Nimbia, found in the 610 million year old Twitya formation, and older rocks dating to 770 million years ago in Kazakhstan.

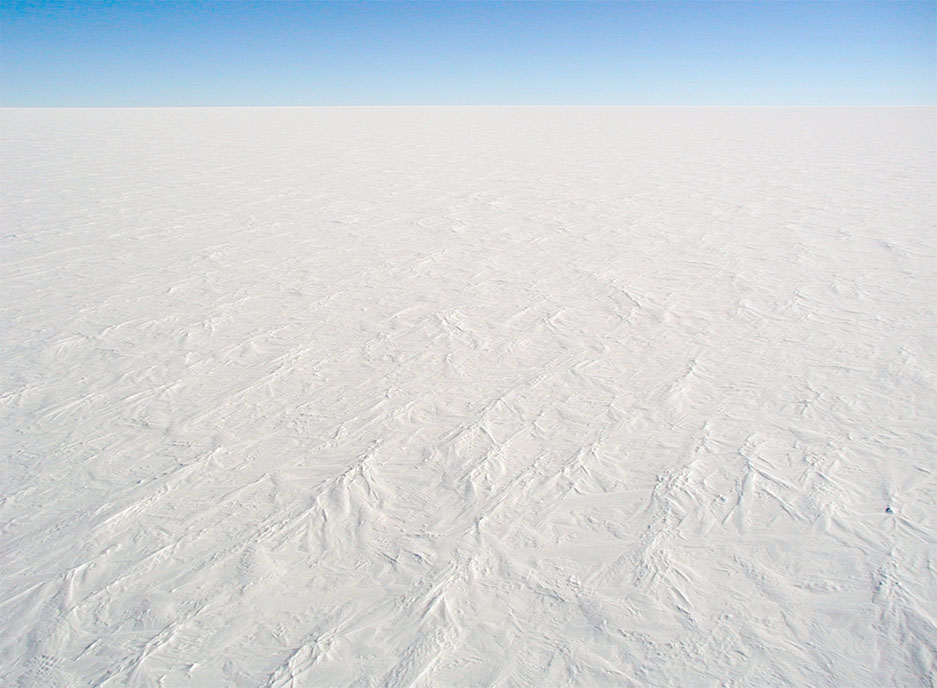
Global ice sheets might have delayed or prevented the establishment of multicellular life.

On the early Earth, reactive elements, such as iron and uranium, existed in a reduced form that would react with any free oxygen produced by photosynthesising organisms. Oxygen would not be able to build up in the atmosphere until all the iron had rusted (producing banded iron formations), and all the other reactive elements had been oxidised. Donald Canfield detected records of the first significant quantities of atmospheric oxygen just before the first Ediacaran fossils appeared – and the presence of atmospheric oxygen was soon heralded as a possible trigger for the Ediacaran radiation. Oxygen seems to have accumulated in two pulses; the rise of small, sessile (stationary) organisms seems to correlate with an early oxygenation event, with larger and mobile organisms appearing around the second pulse of oxygenation. However, the assumptions underlying the reconstruction of atmospheric composition have attracted some criticism, with widespread anoxia having little effect on life where it occurs in the Early Cambrian and the Cretaceous.

Periods of intense cold have also been suggested as a barrier to the evolution of multicellular life. The earliest known embryos, from China's Doushantuo Formation, appear just a million years after the Earth emerged from a global glaciation, suggesting that ice cover and cold oceans may have prevented the emergence of multicellular life.

In early 2008, a team analysed the range of basic body structures ("disparity") of Ediacaran organisms from three different fossil beds: Avalon in Canada, 575 million years ago to 565 million years ago; White Sea in Russia, 560 million years ago to 550 million years ago; and Nama in Namibia, 550 million years ago to 542 million years ago, immediately before the start of the Cambrian. They found that, while the White Sea assemblage had the most species, there was no significant difference in disparity between the three groups, and concluded that before the beginning of the Avalon timespan these organisms must have gone through their own evolutionary "explosion", which may have been similar to the famous Cambrian explosion.

=== Extinction ===
==== Preservation bias ====
The paucity of Ediacaran fossils after the Cambrian could simply be due to conditions no longer favoring the fossilization of Ediacaran organisms, which may have continued to thrive unpreserved for a considerable time. However, if they were common, more than the occasional specimen might be expected in exceptionally preserved fossil assemblages (Konservat-Lagerstätten) such as the Burgess Shale and Chengjiang. Although no reports of Ediacara-type organisms in the Cambrian period are widely accepted at present, a few disputed reports have been made, as well as unpublished observations of 'vendobiont' fossils from 535 Ma Orsten-type deposits in China.

==== Predation and grazing ====
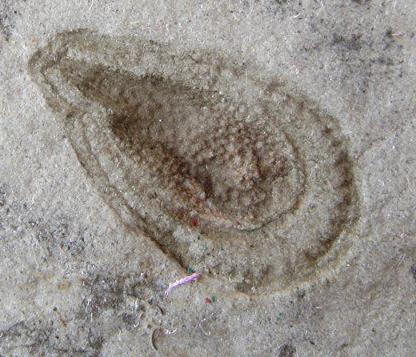
Kimberella might have had a predatory or grazing lifestyle.

It has been suggested that by the Early Cambrian, organisms higher in the food chain caused the microbial mats to largely disappear. If these grazers first appeared as the Ediacaran biota started to decline, then it may suggest that they destabilised the microbial mats in a "Cambrian substrate revolution", leading to displacement or detachment of the biota; or that the destruction of the microbial substrate destabilized the ecosystem, causing extinctions.

Alternatively, skeletonized animals could have fed directly on the relatively undefended Ediacaran biota. However, if the interpretation of the Ediacaran age Kimberella as a grazer is correct then this suggests that the biota had already had limited exposure to "predation".

==== Competition ====
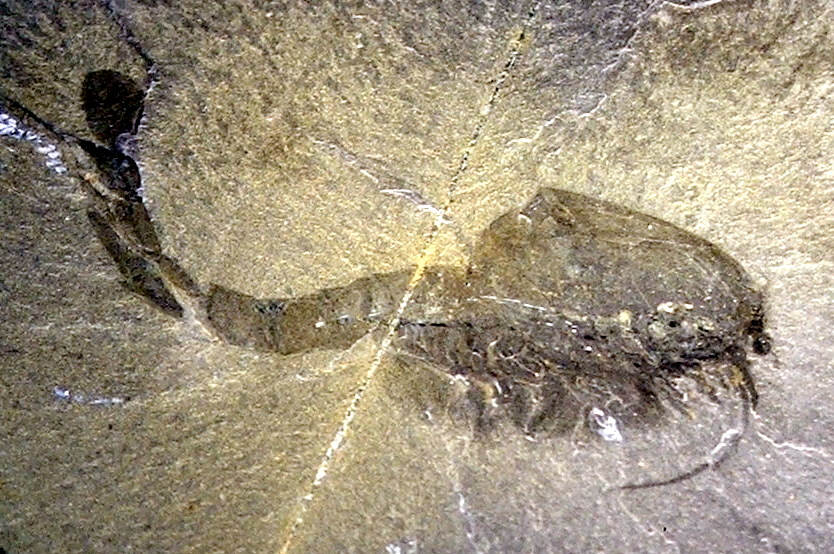
Cambrian animals such as Waptia might have competed with, or fed upon, Ediacaran life-forms.

Increased competition due to the evolution of key innovations among other groups, perhaps as a response to predation, may have driven the Ediacaran biota from their niches. However, the supposed "competitive exclusion" of brachiopods by bivalve molluscs was eventually deemed to be a coincidental result of two unrelated trends.

==== Change in environmental conditions ====
Great changes were happening at the end of the Precambrian and the start of the Early Cambrian. The breakup of the supercontinents, rising sea levels (creating shallow, "life-friendly" seas), a nutrient crisis, fluctuations in atmospheric composition, including oxygen and carbon dioxide levels, and changes in ocean chemistry (promoting biomineralisation) could all have played a part.

== See also ==
- Abiogenesis
- Cambrian explosion
- Francevillian biota, another, much earlier Precambrian biota
- Huainan biota
- Large ornamented Ediacaran microfossil
- List of Ediacaran genera
- Nilpena Ediacara National Park, South Australia
