= Avalon assemblage =

Ediacaran biotic assemblage

Avalon Assemblage
- ~575 – ~560 Ma
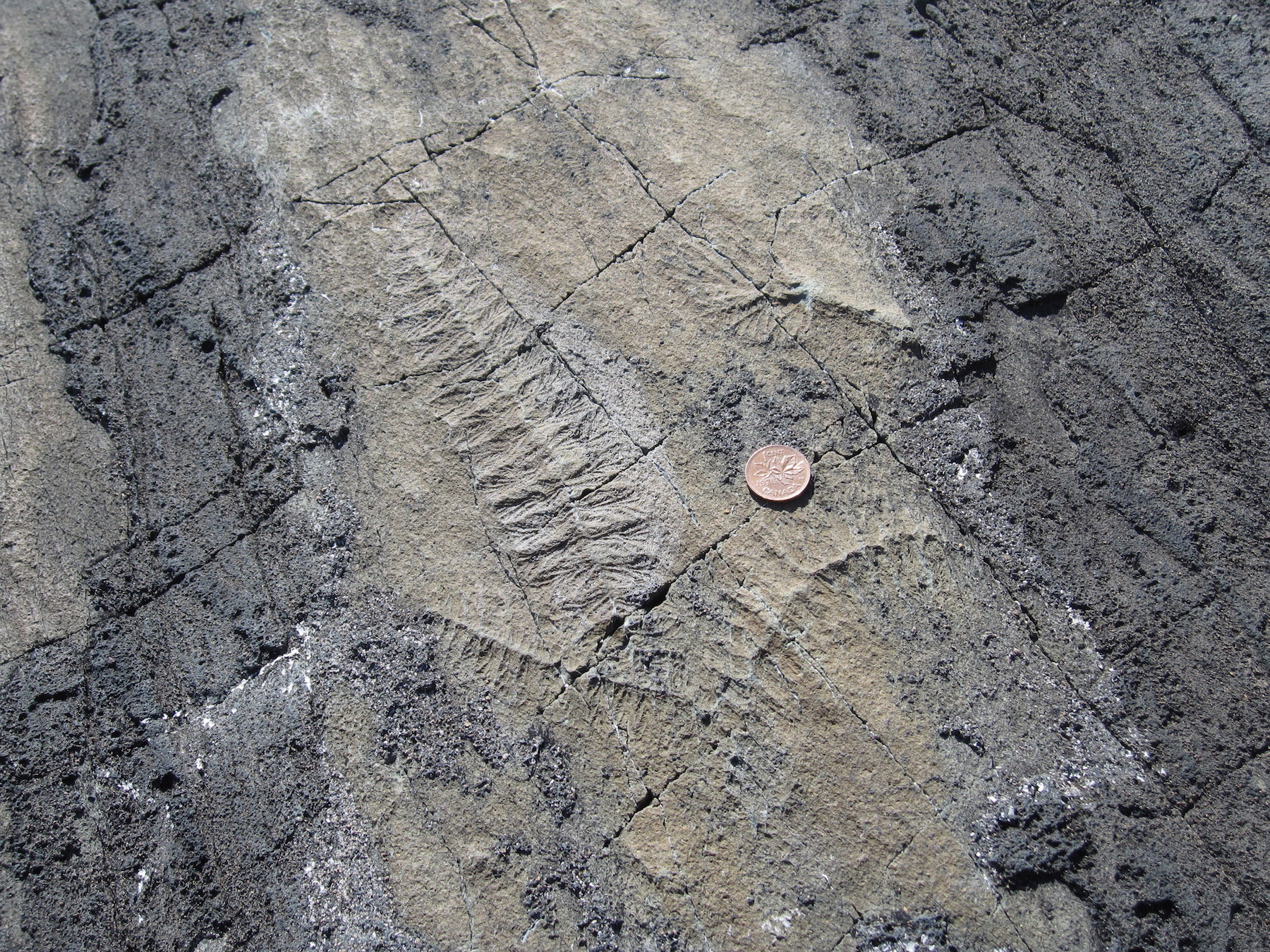
- Frondose fossils from Mistaken Point, on the Avalon Peninsula of Canada.

Chronology
← / Second pulse of the end-Ediacaran extinction; ← / ~Baykonurian glaciation; ← / First pulse of the end-Ediacaran extinction; ← / Avalon Explosion; ← / Shuram excursion reaches its peak
Major Glacial period; Shuram excursion
Stratigraphic scale of the ICS subdivisions and Ediacaran biotic assmblages Vertical axis scale: millions of years ago

Definition
- Type section: Mistaken Point, Newfoundland, Canada 46°37′55″N 53°11′25″W

The Avalon assemblage was the first of the three Late Ediacaran biotic assemblages, spanning from c. 575 Ma to c. 560 Ma. It was followed by the White Sea assemblage, although temporal overlaps have been noted between the biotic assemblages. While earlier macroscopic fossils, mostly of algal origin, are known from the Lantian Formation, Avalon-type localities provide some of the first evidence of putative metazoan ancestors, as part of the Ediacaran biota.

== Research history ==
The division of the Ediacaran biota in three separate assemblages was first postulated by Ben Waggoner in 2003.

== Geography ==
Most Avalonian fossil sites are known from the central United Kingdom and eastern Newfoundland, historically connected as part of the Avalonia microcontinent. Outside of Avalonia proper, other sites have been identified as part of the Avalon assemblage, such as the Olenek Uplift in Siberia, and Sekwi Brooke in the Northwest Territories of Canada.

== Biota ==
Deep-water rangeomorphs, and to a lesser extent arboreomorphs, dominated the Avalonian biota, although other macrofossil taxa are known. Certain clades typical of the Ediacaran biota, such as dipleurozoans, are not known from Avalon assemblage sites, but only appear in the more recent shallow-water White Sea assemblage. Nonetheless, the Avalon biota has been described as occupying the full range of morphologies that would later be present in the following assemblages.
