= Avalon explosion =

Proposed evolutionary event in the history of metazoa, producing the Ediacaran biota

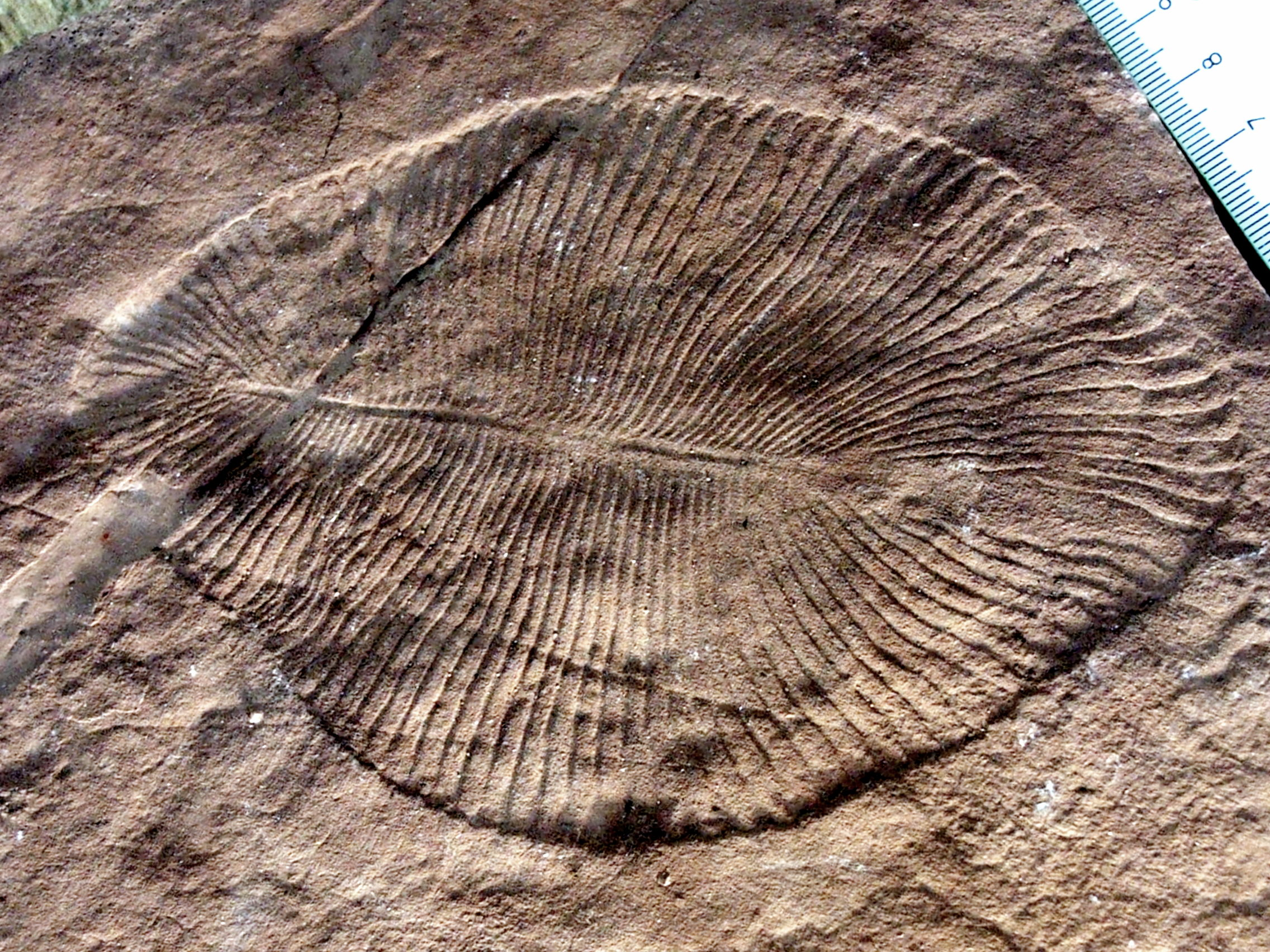
Dickinsonia, an enigmatic quilted organism with glide symmetry which may have been an early animal

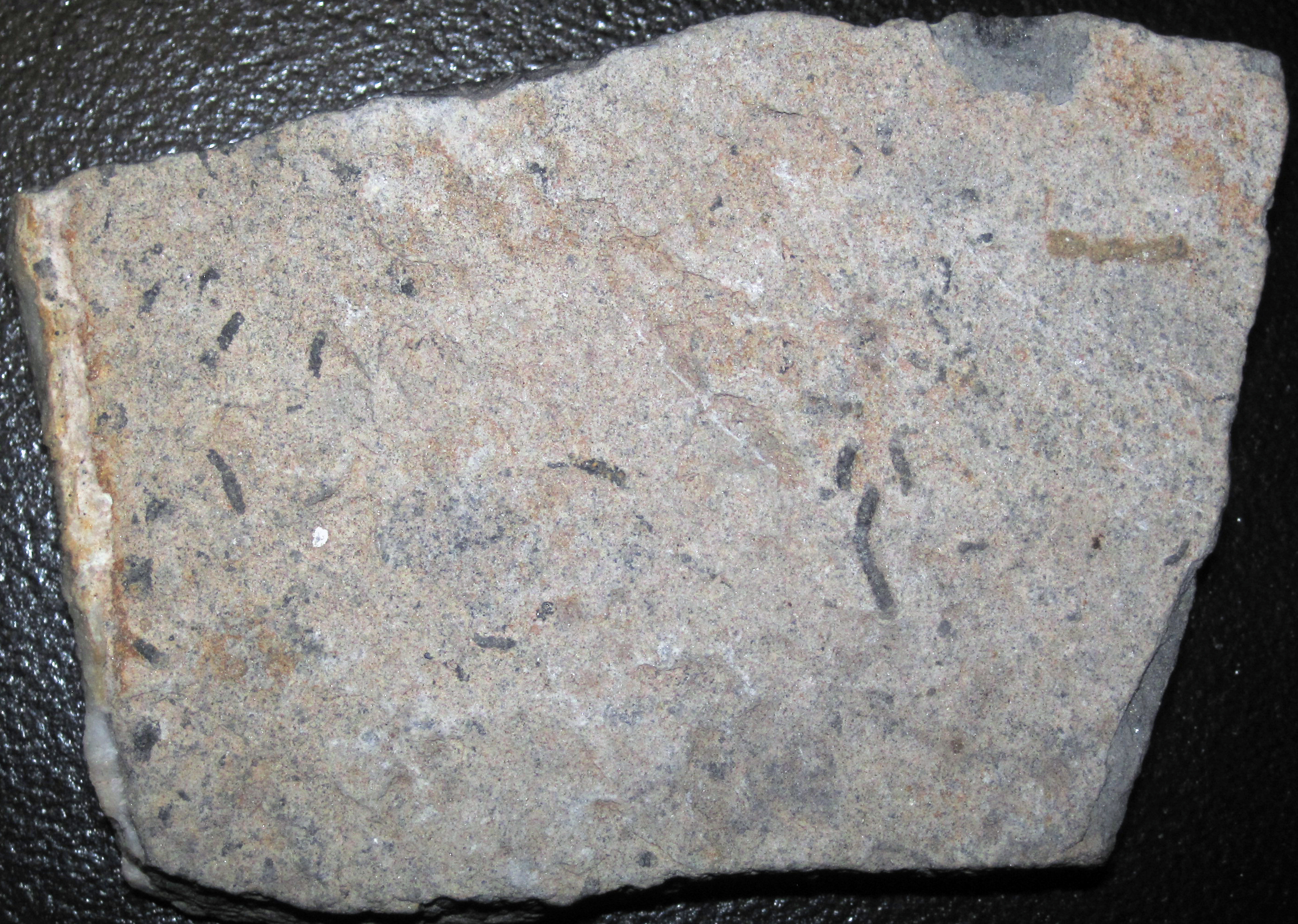
Cloudina may have been one of the first mineralized animals to appear, although its life appearance and evolutionary affinities remain unknown.

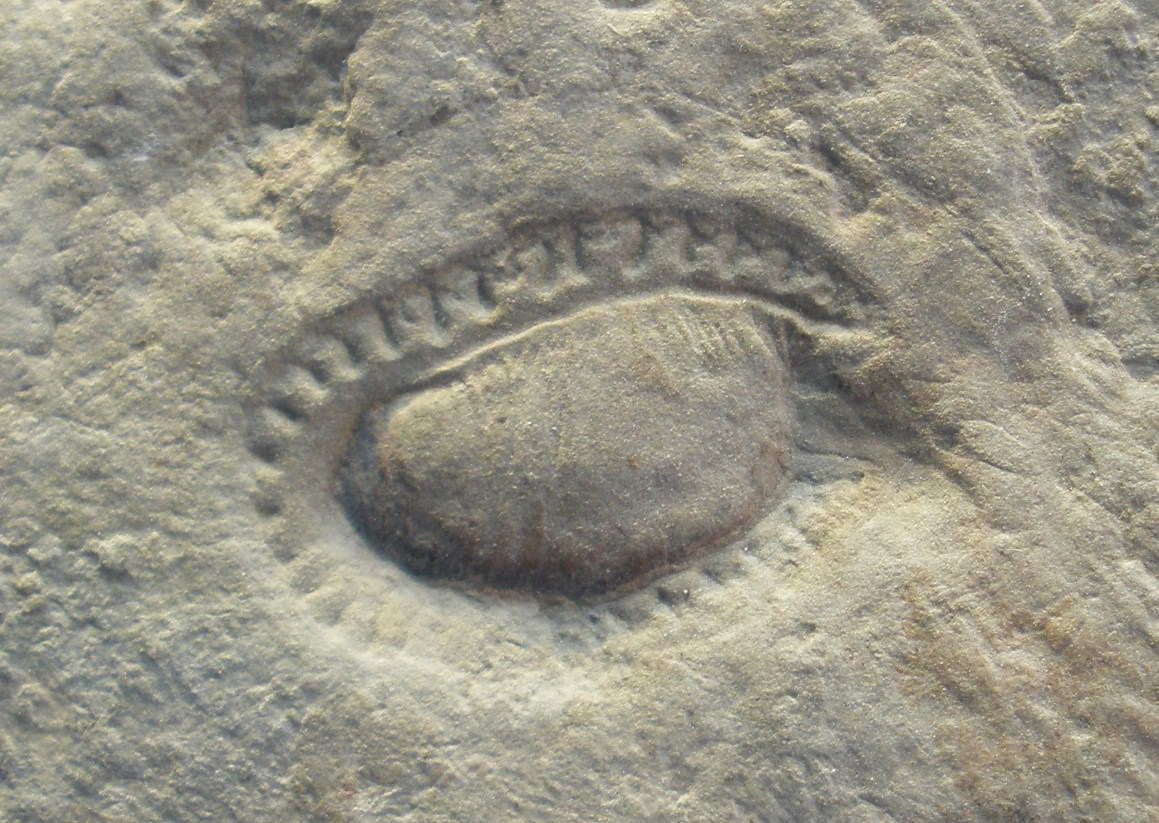
Kimberella is an enigmatic fossil that has been interpreted as a cubozoan cnidarian, or as an early mollusc, but its identity is still unclear.

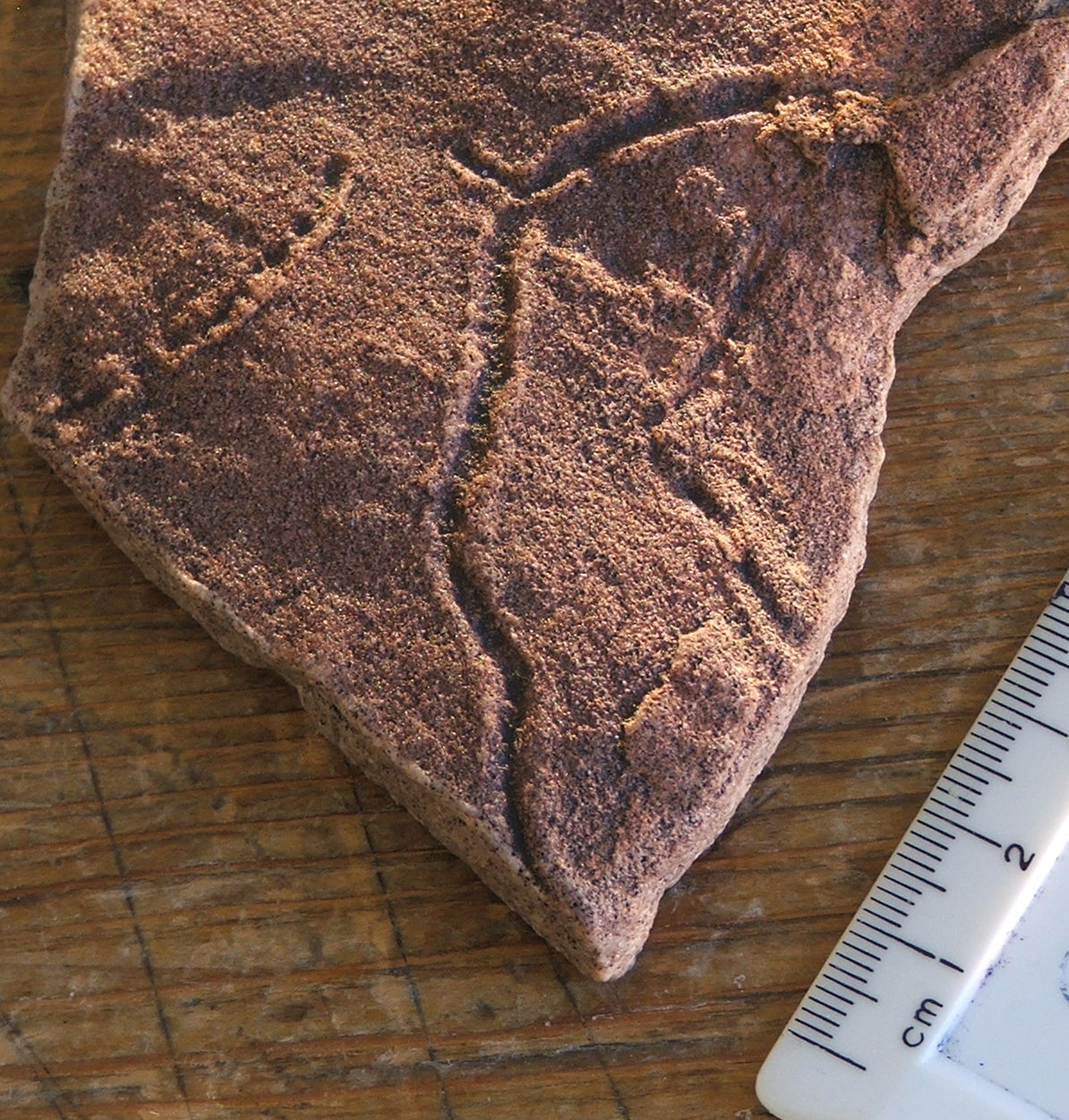
The Ediacaran trace fossils are a sign of animal movement as well as sediment disturbance, they show possible signs of the earliest true animals.

The Avalon explosion is a proposed evolutionary radiation event of prehistoric animals about 575 million years ago during the Ediacaran period of the late Neoproterozoic, named after the mold and trace fossils of Precambrian macroscopic faunae discovered on the Avalon Peninsula in Newfoundland, eastern Canada. This evolutionary event is believed to have occurred some 36.2 million years earlier than the much more famous Cambrian explosion of the early Phanerozoic, which had been long thought to be when complex life first started on Earth.

Scientists are still unsure of the full extent behind the Avalon explosion, which resulted in a rapid increase in metazoan biodiversity, including the first appearance of modern extant infrakingdoms/superphyla such as cnidarians and bilaterians. Most of the species that thrived during Avalon explosion — known collectively as the Ediacaran biota — are sessile/sedentary soft-bodied organisms living in the benthic marine environments, and the first stages of the Avalon explosion were observed through comparatively minimal species.

== History ==
Charles Darwin predicted a time of ecological growth before the Cambrian Period, but there was no evidence to support it until the Avalon explosion was proposed in 2008 by Virginia Tech paleontologists after analysis of the morphological space change in several Ediacaran assemblages. The discovery suggests that the early evolution of animals may have involved more than one explosive event. The original analysis has been the subject of dispute in the literature.

== Evidence ==
Trace fossils of these Avalon organisms have been found worldwide, with many found in Newfoundland, in Canada and the Charnwood Forest in England, representing the earliest known complex multicellular organisms. (Note: Simple multicellular organisms such as red algae evolved at least 1,200 million years ago.) The Avalon explosion theoretically produced the Ediacaran biota. The biota largely disappeared contemporaneously with the rapid increase in biodiversity known as the Cambrian explosion. At this time, all living animal groups were present in the Cambrian oceans.

The Avalon explosion appears similar to the Cambrian explosion in the rapid increase in diversity of morphologies in a relatively small-time frame, followed by diversification within the established body plans, a pattern similar to that observed in other evolutionary events.

== Fauna ==
The Avalon explosion was a time of early evolution and low diversity in species. There were over 270 species defined, with 50 different morphological characteristics categories, many of whose anatomical structures had to be inferred with fossils and casts. These species were placed into 20 different genera.

During this time, animals became bilateral and increasingly complex. Many animals during this time fit into the annelid, arthropod, echinoderm, and cnidarian phyla. Animals at this time developed bilateral symmetry with a clear anterior and posterior side, which included species like Spriggina, Charniodiscus and Yorgia.

Many of the superficially plant-like fossils fit into a now-extinct phylum of Vendobionta. The Vendobionta were arranged (symmetry, body plan) in several ways, some radial, some parallel, some concentric. Such "frondlets" were actually prominent animals during this time, with many different shapes, including Fractofusus, which had a spindle shape, Fradgatia, with a "lettuce" shape, and Rangea, which had a leaf-like shape.

== See also ==
- Cambrian explosion – Period of major evolutionary diversification of animal life
- Carboniferous-Earliest Permian Biodiversification Event – Evolutionary radiation of marine invertebrates
- Great Ordovician Biodiversification Event – Evolutionary radiation of marine animal life throughout the Ordovician period
