= Shuram excursion =

The Shuram excursion, or Shuram-Wonoka excursion, is a change in δ^{13}C, or in the ratio of carbon-13 to carbon-12, taking place during the Ediacaran period. The exact time period of the excursion is debated among scholars, beginning around 573 Ma and ending around 562 or 551 Ma. It was first noticed in the Wonoka Formation in South Australia in 1990 and later in the Clemente Formation of Mexico in 1992 and the Shuram Formation in Oman in 1993. It is the largest negative δ^{13}C excursion in Earth history, and recovery took 50 million years, although the apparent magnitude of the excursion may be distorted due to meteoric water diagenesis.

It is not known what caused the excursion. The Shuram excursion may have played a role in sparking the rise of animals that resulted later in the Cambrian explosion. The oxygen-consuming Ediacara biota experienced a radiation during the isotopic excursion as a response to the transient surplus of oxidants. Microbial blooms of oxygenic phototrophs regulated the recovery of the carbon cycle from the isotopic excursion.
