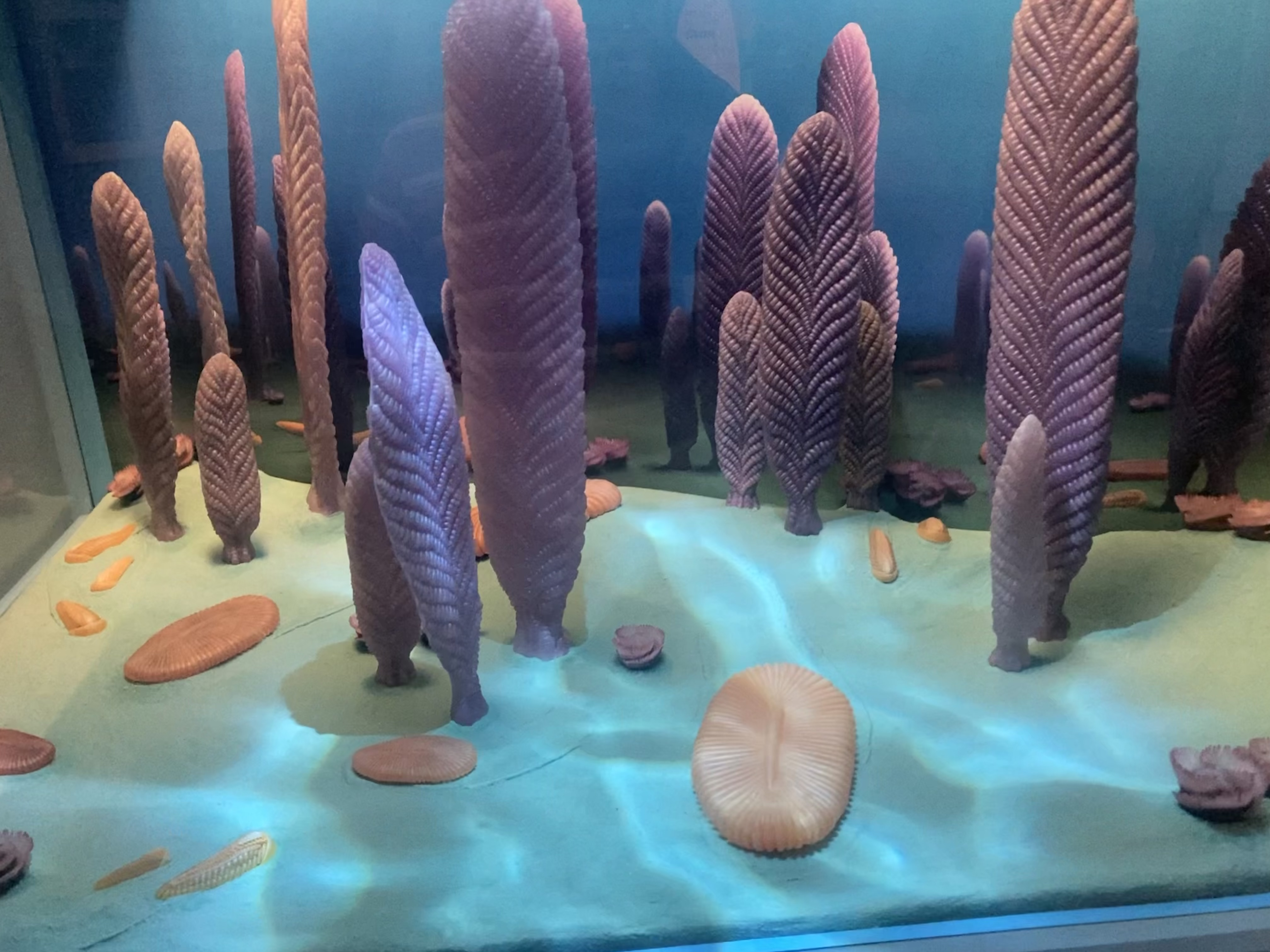
- Diorama of the Ediacaran biota at the Field Museum of Natural History in Chicago, Illinois

Scientific classification
- Kingdom: Animalia
- (unranked): †Vendobionta; Seilacher (1992)

Subtaxa
- †Petalonamae; †Proarticulata; †Trilobozoa

Synonyms
- Vendozoa Seilacher (1989)

= Vendobionta =

Vendobionta Temporal range: Ediacaran

Group of extinct creatures that were part of the Ediacaran biota

Vendobionts or Vendozoans (Vendobionta) are a proposed very high-level, extinct clade of benthic organisms that is made up of the majority of the organisms that were part of the Ediacaran biota. It is a hypothetical group. It would be the oldest of the animals that populated the Earth about 580 million years ago, in the Ediacaran period (formerly Vendian). They became extinct shortly after the so-called Cambrian explosion, with the introduction of fauna forming groups more recognizably related to modern animals. It is likely that the whole Ediacaran biota is not a monophyletic clade and not every genus placed in its subtaxa is an animal.

This biological group is not widely recognized; credibility is limited by the expansive speculation needed to establish phylogenetic relationships between such ancient extinct groups. The hypothesis was formulated by the German geologist Adolf Seilacher, who even doubts its relationship with the animal kingdom, or its multicellular nature — the group might have originated independently, and could be large unicellular forms. It has also been proposed that they could have been cnidarians, or articulates; perhaps a fungus, colonial protist, alga, or lichen; or a group divergent from all current animals. The only current consensus is that they could not have been photosynthetic. In any case, like the acritarchs, they are considered evolutionary enigmas, and possibly an independent and extinct kingdom.

== Features ==
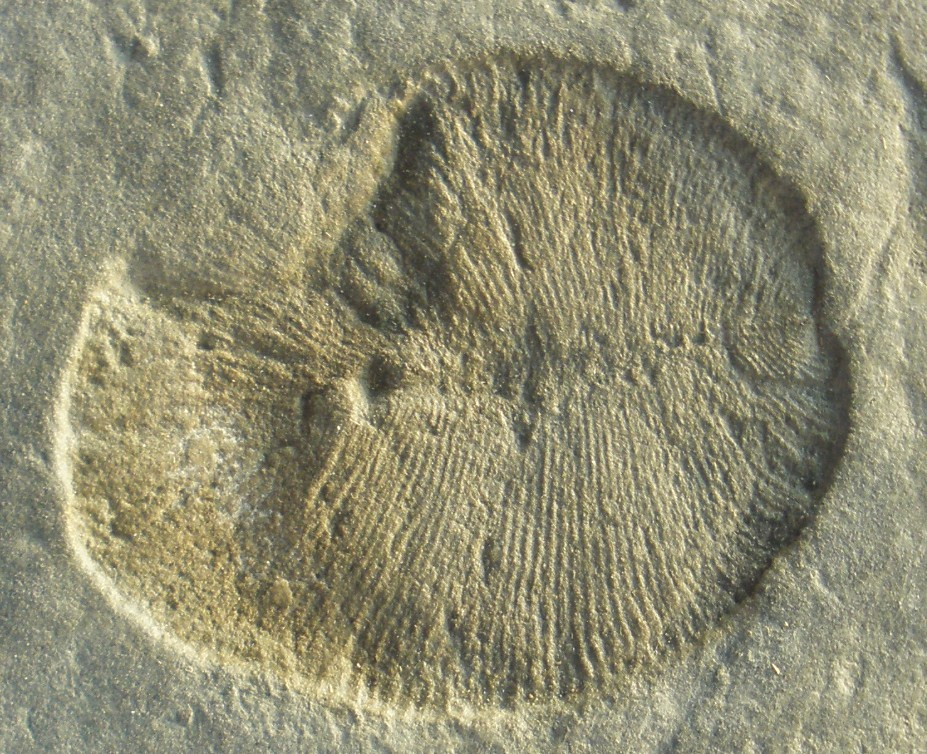
Dickinsonia, a proarticulate.

Within the description of this hypothetical group, characteristics have been proposed that could have been common in all the first groups of Ediacaran organisms:

=== Structure ===
Relatively soft body, without hard parts such as armor or skeletons. In appearance, they have been compared to thin inflatable mattresses generally flat and filled with a liquid which has been called plasmodial fluid. Internally they could contain a single compartment (the syncytium) and externally they presented several types of folds or segments (parallel, radial, or concentric) in addition to, probably, some type of cell wall (such as plants or fungi) that offered resistance to contraction or compaction, thus promoting fossilization.

=== Habitat ===
All were marine and probably also benthic, inhabiting the seabed, from shallow to deep subtidal environments. Even medusoids, which were thought to be swimmers, were actually later concluded to be like polyps or benthic discs anchored to the seabed, or semi-buried endobentonics. This habitat influenced the popular name of "The garden of Ediacara".

The Ediacarans' abundant preservation is surprising, despite having soft bodies; this almost surely indicates the absence of burrowing creatures in their home sediments.

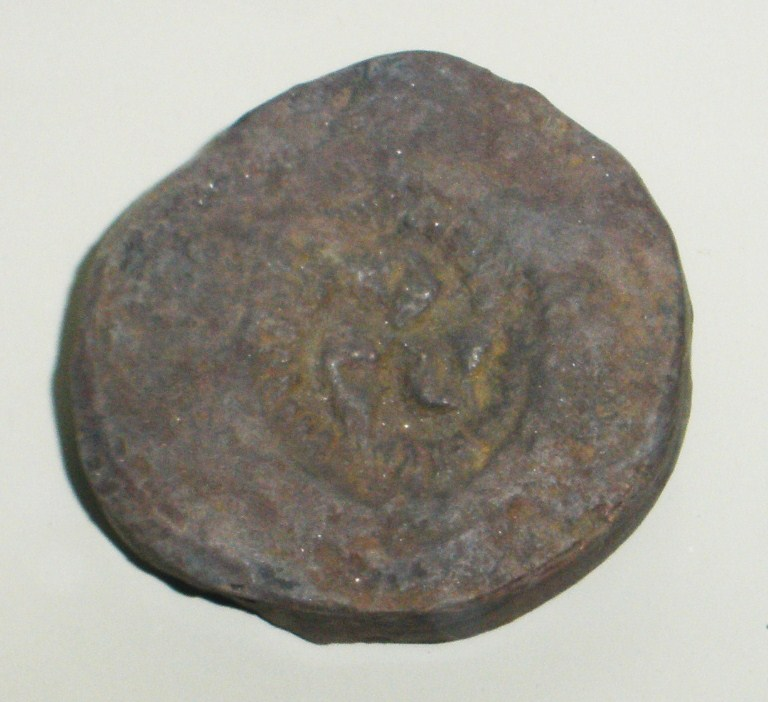
Tribrachidium, a trilobozoan.

=== Mobility ===
Most lacked locomotion. The oldest groups did not have any capacity for movement, as evidenced by the complete lack of ash and sediment disturbance during fossilization. It is believed that there were no musculature or nervous system, given their simplicity, and many were sessile. However, it is considered that the movement would have appeared in Proarticulata and would have been slow and sliding; presumably, mobile representatives such as Spriggina grazed on a lawn of microorganisms (epifaunal grazing). This characteristic of Proarticulata is the main argument to consider that vendobionts, if they were a clade, would be ascribed to the animal kingdom; although the development of its own nervous system would have been independent of the other animals.

=== Diet ===
There is no definitive evidence of the presence of the mouth, anus, or a digestive system, although internal structures have been identified. It is believed that the feeding could have been by osmosis, just as fungi or bacteria do. The presence of numerous streaks, folds or segments considerably increases the total surface area, necessary for the osmotic absorption of nutrients. It was also proposed that they were photosynthetic organisms, however, they lived at different depths, even under 200 meters, where light does not reach for photosynthesis. Due to the absence of bite marks in the Ediacaran fossils, it was concluded that the vendobionts were not predators nor were they exposed to them; which could then have made them easy victims of Cambrian predators.

=== Growth ===
They grow preserving their shape and maintain the same number of segments regardless of size, although the segments are subdivided more and more. It is believed that they did not have an embryonic stage. If so, they would be a different group from the other animals.

=== Reproduction ===
Vendozoan reproduction would apparently have been asexual. No gonads (sex organs) have been recognized.

== Age and distribution ==
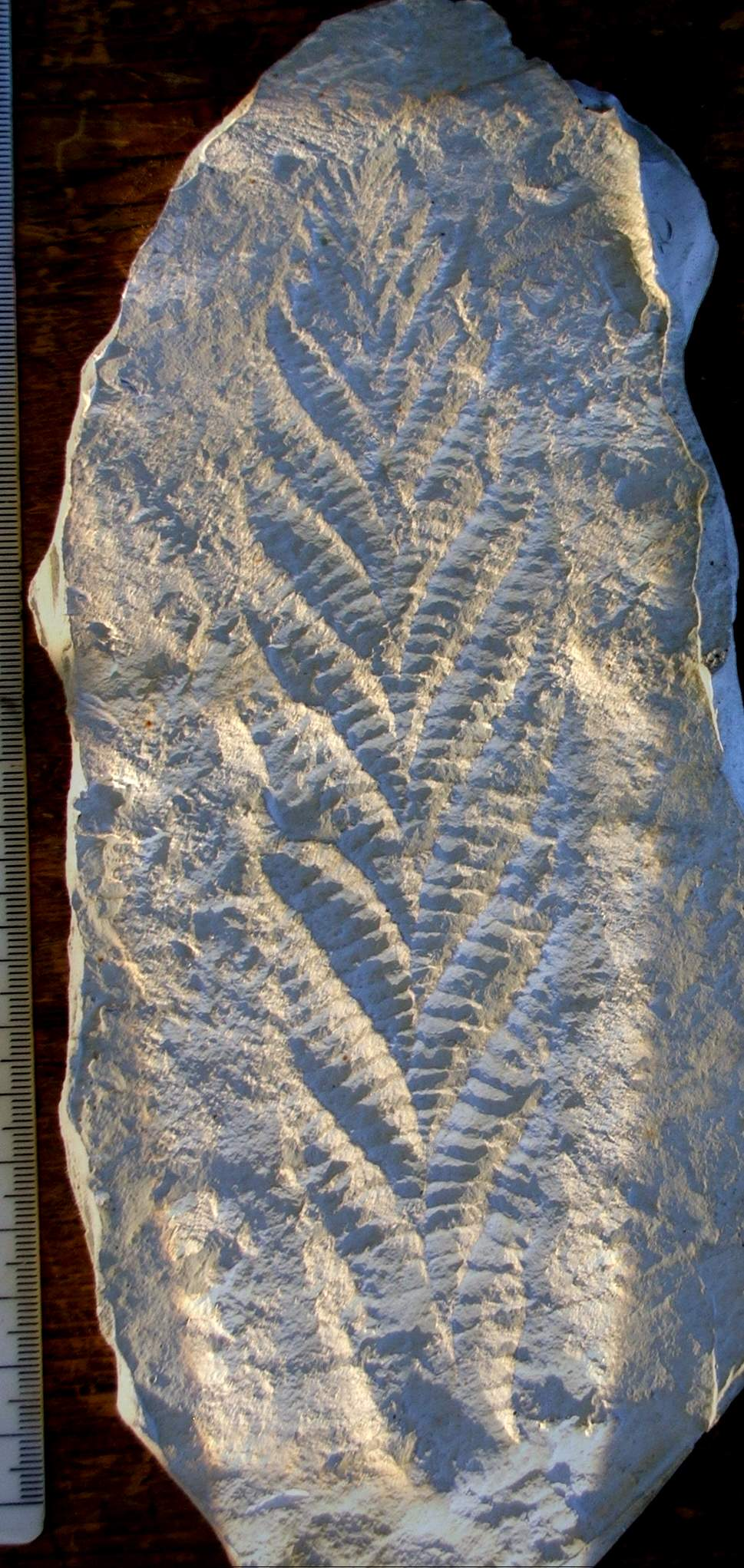
Charnia, a frondomorph.

The first to appear were frondomorphs (Petalonamae) and simple medusoids 578 Ma (millions of years) ago and are considered the oldest complex life forms. The Ediacaran biota is chronologically divided into three associations:

1. The Avalon association is the oldest fossil bed. It is found in the cliffs of the Avalon Peninsula, Newfoundland (578–560 Ma), and shows a postglacial, deep-water habitat. The Avalonian organisms are completely benthic, with a predominance of rangeomorphs, well below the photic zone, at a depth of one kilometer, which rules out that they were algae or lichens. The Avalon biota achieve great distribution in all marine niches, worldwide: There was an abrupt appearance of macroscopic organisms in what was called the Avalon explosion, 37 million years before the Cambrian explosion. These same organisms – frondomorphs and medusoids – were the last to disappear during the extinction of all Vendobionts in the Cambrian.
2. The bilateralomorphs (Proarticulata) appeared 555 Ma ago and had more environmental restrictions, being found in tropical seas. The White Sea association (560–550 Ma, Russia and Australia), showed a great variety of new fossil footprints and the greatest diversity occurs in rocks that were deposited in well-lit and energetically active shallow waters.
3. The last Ediacaran association is that of Nama (550–541 Ma, Namibia), where a decrease in biodiversity is observed, as a preamble to the massive extinction of the Ediacaran biota. Before the end of the Ediacaran period, proarticulates and trilobozoans would have already become extinct; and the last vendobionts disappear with the arrival of the animals of the Cambrian explosion.

== Systematics ==
The classification is very controversial. As a unified group they have been placed primarily in Animalia, but are considered by others to be protists, fungi, terrestrial lichens, or an independent kingdom. Those who see here different unrelated groups, place the proarticulates in Bilateria basally (this opinion is the most upheld among these alternative theories) or as pre-arthropods, the petalonams with cnidarians such as sea pens or as ctenophores, and the trilobozoa and medusoids are considered jellyfish without cnidoblasts and classified in Cnidaria or Coelenterata. Finally, given their antiquity, others consider it speculative to develop a phylogeny or to directly relate these organisms to modern animals.

=== Comparison with protists ===
It has been suggested that vendobionts may come from amoeboid protozoa or protists, and be, for example, similar to xenophyophores, which are unicellular foraminifera that have developed large size, reaching 20 cm. They could therefore have been unicellular organisms that developed macroscopic size thanks to the absence of predators, since all the groups have a size that ranges from a few millimeters to exceeding a meter in length, favored by the increase in oxygen; in such a way that the opportunity is opened to consider that they were not animals, fungi or plants, but an independent and extinct kingdom. However, structural studies of these fossils have so far revealed no traces of a shell, testa or carapace organic material (sclerotized), agglutinated or mineralized, the presence of which is implicit in this hypothesis.

It has also been suggested that the Ediacaran biota could be formed by colonial organisms, as an intermediate degree between protists and animals. However, the morphological complexity and the absence of layers of stromatolites or other microbial structures, in addition to indications that they were multicellular as seen in discoid forms like Aspidella; would indicate that they were not colonial.

=== Comparison with coelenterates ===
All vendobionts, except proarticulates, have been classified in Cnidaria by some on the basis of morphological similarities, although differences have also been described.

==== Similarities ====
Petalonamae shares basic structural characteristics with sea pens cnidarians (Pennatulacea). Similarly, the extant jellyfish impressions and the Proterozoic (Ediacaran) medusoid circular impressions show general similarities in the arrangement and position of radial and concentric structures, as well as a central raised axis.

==== Differences ====
Recent sea feathers have produced fossil impressions that are more misshapen and irregular than Proterozoic fossils. While in medusoids, concentric rings and radial grooves are more numerous in Proterozoic fossils, as strongly folded or deformed fossils are rare compared to modern jellyfish prints. This could mean that Ediacaran organisms, despite not having hard parts, had stiffer or firmer bodies than many modern cnidarians of comparable size. Many Ediacaran fossils have no counterpart among existing forms. The structural simplicity of the impressions of existing Ediacaran and cnidarians suggests that their mutual similarities may be due to convergence; however, possible phylogenetic affinities between them cannot be completely ruled out.

==== Difference with Petalonamae ====
There are important morphological differences. The current sea feathers are actually a colony of polyps, they grow from a polyp that after losing its tentacles becomes the axis of the colony and from which the other tentaculated polyps grow, they are also quite capable of certain movements. On the other hand, the petalonamos are immobile, they do not seem to be a colony and could rather be closer to the proarticulated ones due to their simple and flat shape, because of their segmentation and because of the lack of a mouth, anus and tentacles, in addition, instead of a axis there is usually a middle suture that can be zigzagging if the segments are alternate. An analysis of the growth and development of Charnia fossils through laser imaging of the holotype reveals that it cannot be related to modern cnidarians such as sea feathers, with which it has been compared for so long, because they have opposite growth polarities.

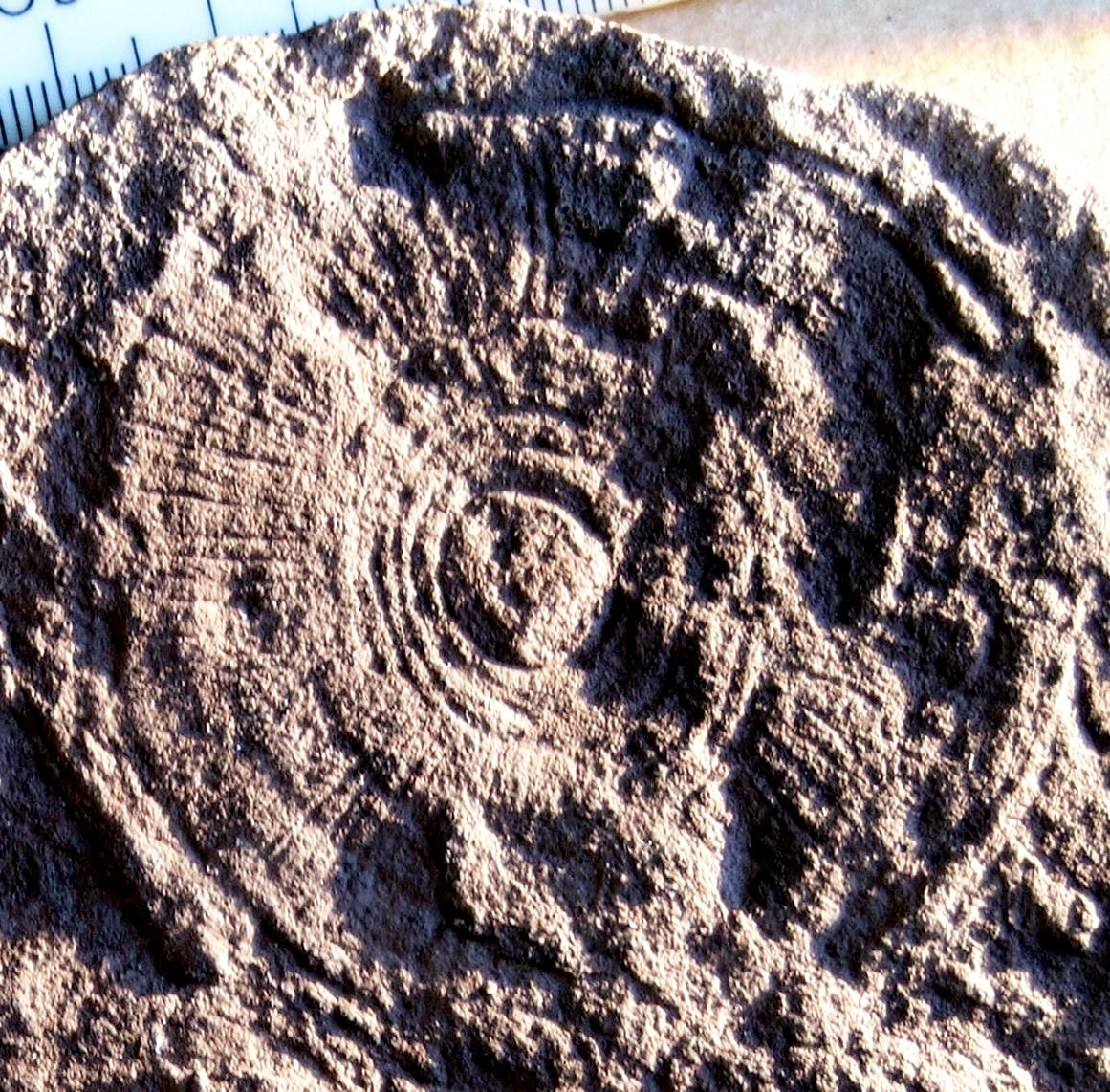
Cyclomedusa, a medusoid.

==== Differences with medusoids ====
There are morphological differences between the jellyfish and their globose and gelatinous shape, compared to the flat, discoid medusoids, with relief that is greater on the dorsal side and firmer due to the indications that would reveal the existence of a rigid wall surrounding the body. It can be suggested that there is no evidence that medusoids share biological characteristics with coelenterates; there is no mouth, no two-layered body wall enclosing a single cavity. This, and the evidence for a rigid outer wall, adds to recent doubts about the concept of an Ediacaran fauna that would have been dominated by soft-bodied coelenterates.

=== Comparison with articulates ===
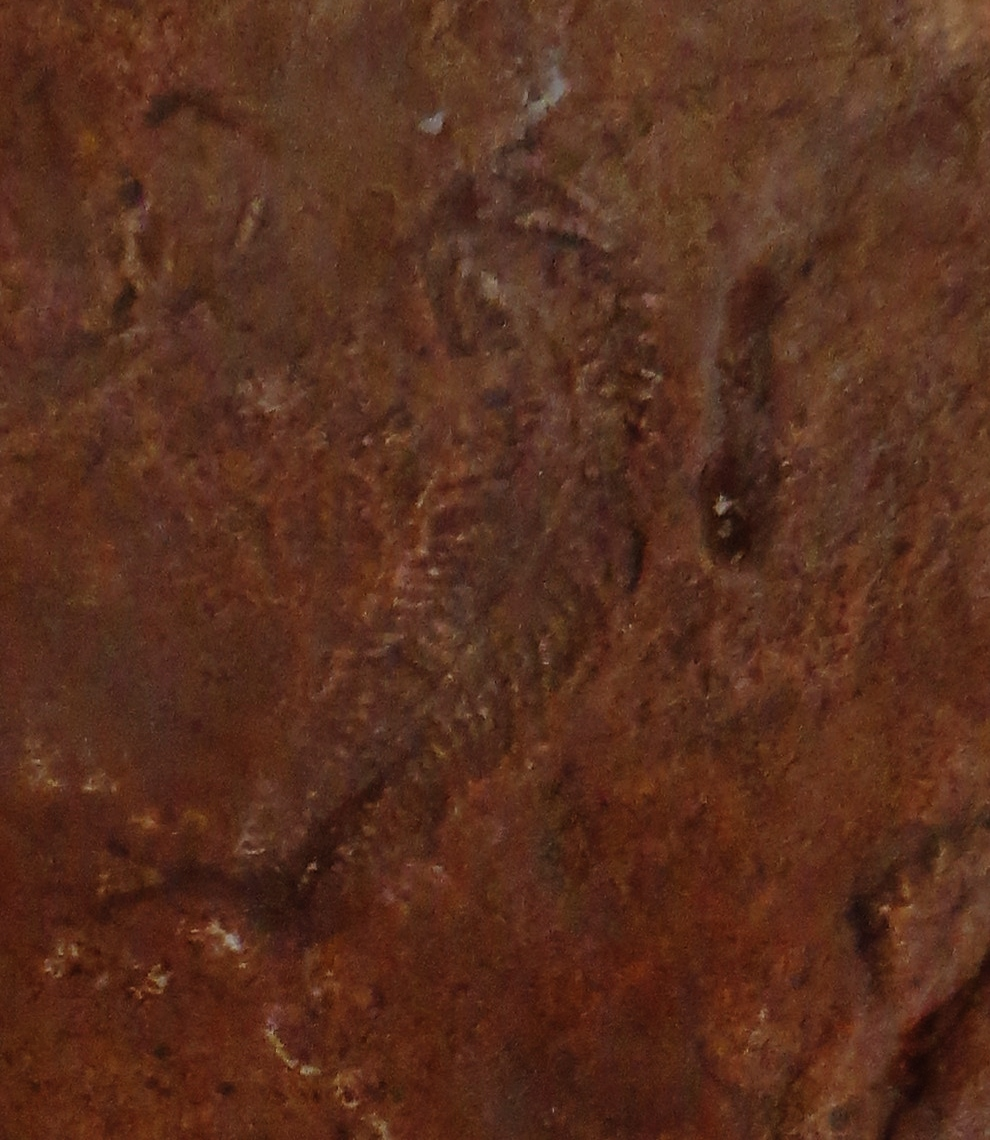
Spriggina, a proarticulate of the group Cephalozoa.

Proarticulata have been compared to modern articulated animals such as arthropods or annelids. However, other anatomical features of the proarticulates, mainly the absence of truly complete segmentation, articulated limbs, and any other lateral processes, do not agree with this interpretation. The body of the proarticulates consisted of two rows of identical 'semi-segments' (the isomers), right and left, located along their longitudinal axis, which does not correspond to the articulated ones. This type of symmetry is not typical in animals; instead, it has been observed in other vendobionts, protists, multicellular colonies and frequently in plants.

In general, Vendobionta is being defined as a group apart from animals, with no proven common origin. However, those in favor of considering them animals, see in the discovery of trails left by some proarticulates that would have locomotion, a decisive argument of the relationship with the metazoans.

=== Comparison with fungi ===
It has been hypothesized that Ediacaran organisms such as frondomorphs or medusoids, could be related to fungi (Fungi) or to some other fungal organism (slime molds), due to certain characteristics such as multicellularity, lack of movement, indeterminate growth, osmotrophic feeding and resistance to taphonomic shrinkage (ease of fossilization given by the presence of a cell wall). However, there is no evidence of mycelial development, nor presence of sporangia or fruiting bodies. For other Ediacaran fossils, a fungal model is clearly inappropriate.
