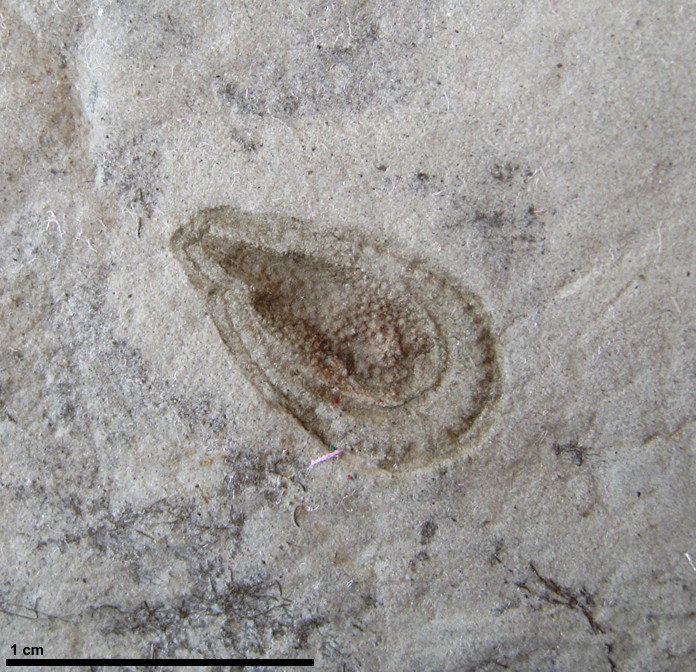
- Remarkably preserved Kimberella at Arkhangelsk Regional Museum, Russia
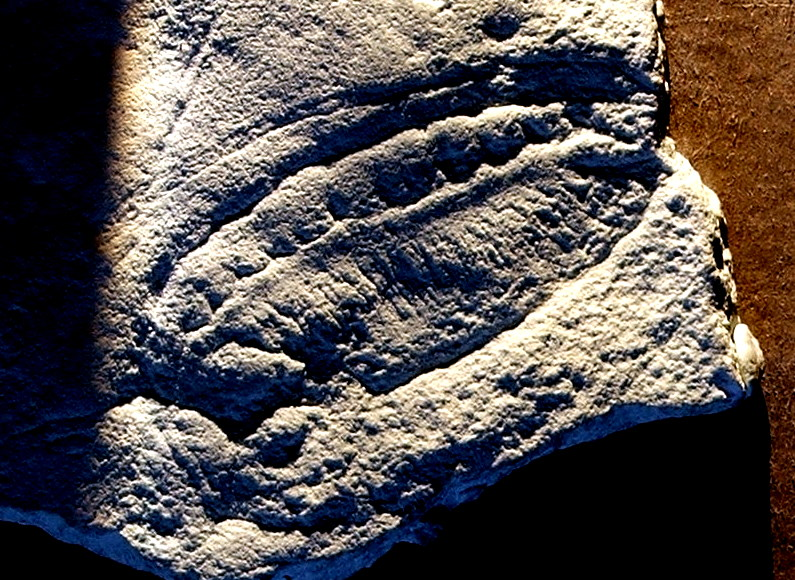
- Cast of a partial Kimberella fossil

Scientific classification
- Kingdom: Animalia
- Clade: Bilateria
- Genus: †Kimberella; Wade, 1972

Type species
- †Kimberella quadrata (Glaessner & Wade, 1966)

Species
- †Kimberella persii Vaziri, Majidifard & Laflamme, 2018; †Kimberella quadrata (Glaessner & Wade, 1966)

Synonyms
- Kimberia Glaessner & Wade, 1966; Solza? Ivantsov, 2004

= Kimberella =

Kimberella Temporal range: Ediacaran, 558–555.3 Ma

Primitive Mollusc-like organism

Kimberella is an extinct genus of marine bilaterian known only from rocks of the Ediacaran period. The slug-like organism fed by scratching the microbial surface on which it dwelt in a manner similar to the gastropods, although its affinity with this group is contentious.

Specimens were first found in Australia's Ediacara Hills, but recent research has concentrated on the numerous finds near the White Sea in Russia, which cover an interval of time from 555 to 558 million years ago. As with many fossils from this time, its evolutionary relationships to other organisms are hotly debated. Paleontologists initially classified Kimberella as a type of cubozoan, but, since 1997, features of its anatomy and its association with scratch marks resembling those made by a radula have been interpreted as signs that it may have been a mollusc. Although some paleontologists dispute its classification as a mollusc, it is generally accepted as being at least a bilaterian.

The classification of Kimberella is important for the scientific understanding of the Cambrian explosion; if it was a mollusc, or at least a protostome, this would mean that the two dominant Nephrozoan lineages would have diverged significantly before 555 million years ago, and if it was at least bilaterian, its age would indicate that animals were diversifying well before the start of the Cambrian.

== Etymology ==
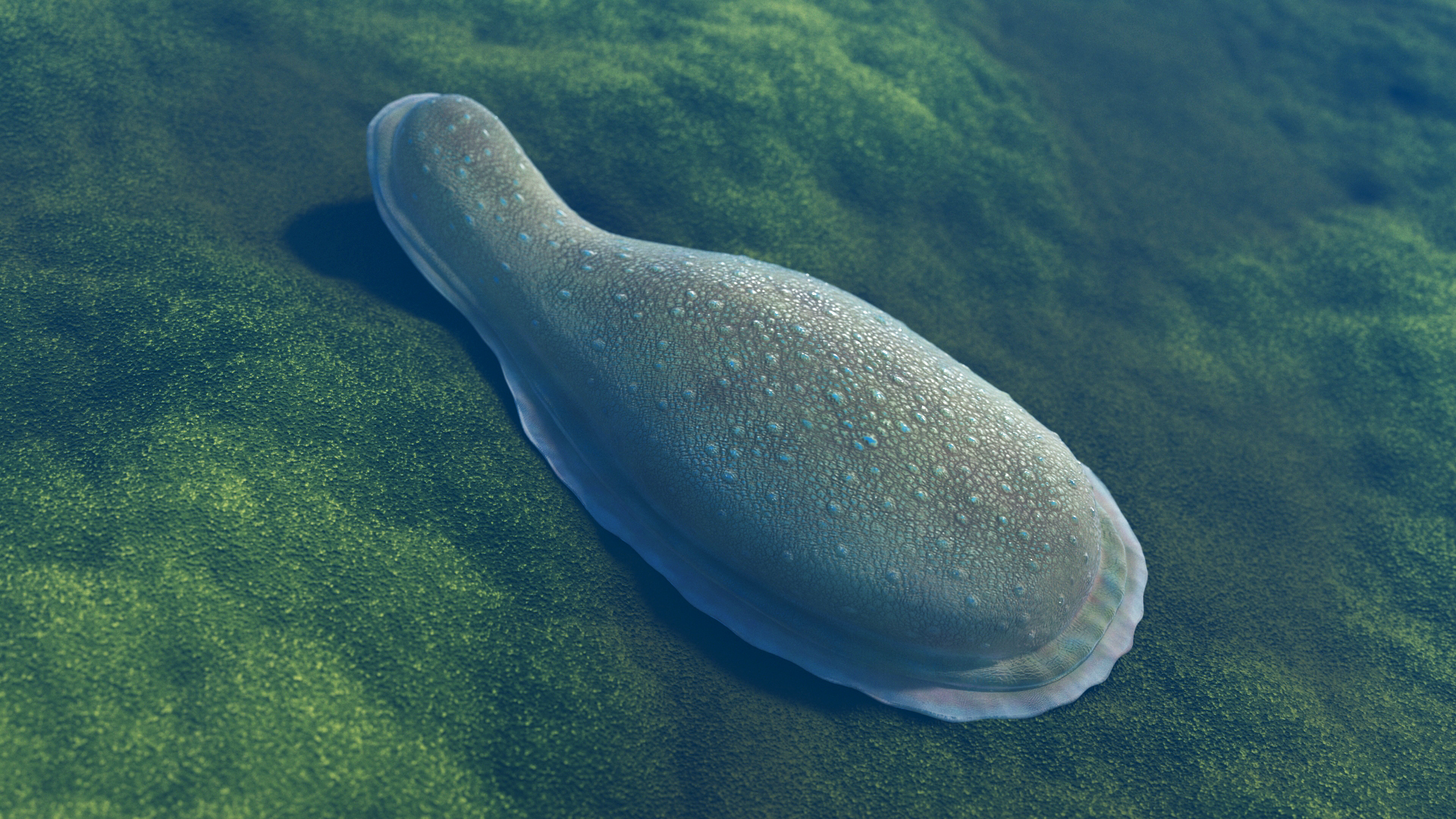
Reconstruction of Kimberella quadrata

The genus is named in honour of Mr. John Kimber, student, teacher, and collector; who lost his life during an expedition to Central Australia in 1964. Originally, the genus was given the name Kimberia, however, the name Kimberia was already in use as a subgenus of Turritella (Gastropoda), according to Dr. N. H. Ludbrook; and a new genus, Kimberella, was proposed by Mary Wade in 1972.

== Occurrence ==
Kimberella has been found in the Ediacara Hills of South Australia, in the Ust' Pinega Formation in the White Sea region of northwest Russia, the Kushk Series of central Iran, the Mogilev Formation in Podolia, Ukraine, and the Kauriyala Formation in the Lesser Himalayan Range region of India. In 2014, Kimberella fossils were found in Brazil, but later studies showed fossils of other Silurian animals. In 2026. Kimberella fossils were reported from the Blueflower Formation of Canada. The White Sea fossils are often associated with the Ediacaran animals Tribrachidium and Dickinsonia, as well as meandering trace fossil trails (possibly made by Kimberella itself), and algae. Beds in the White Sea succession have been dated from 558 to 555.3 ± 0.3 million years ago by radiometric dating, using uranium-lead ratios in zircons found in volcanic ash layers that are sandwiched between layers that contain Kimberella fossils. Kimberella fossils are also known from beds both older and younger than this precisely dated range. The fossils from the Ediacara Hills have not been dated precisely.

== Description ==
Over 1,000 specimens, representing organisms of all stages of maturity, have now been found in the White Sea area at the bottom of fine-grained sandstone layers. The large number of specimens, the small grain-size of the sediments and the variety of circumstances in which specimens were preserved provide detailed information about Kimberella's external form, internal anatomy, locomotion and feeding style.

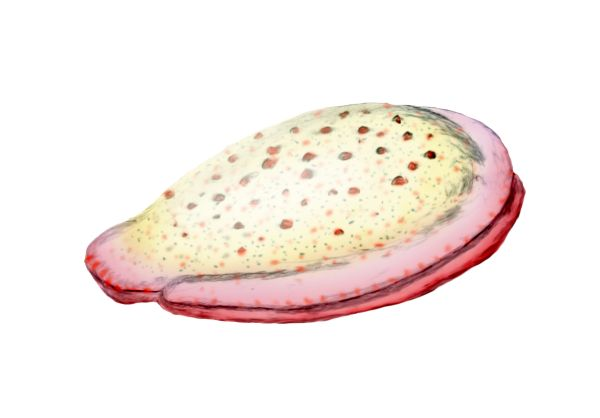
Current life restoration of Kimberella quadrata based on A.Y. Ivantsov's 2009 interpretation of the animal

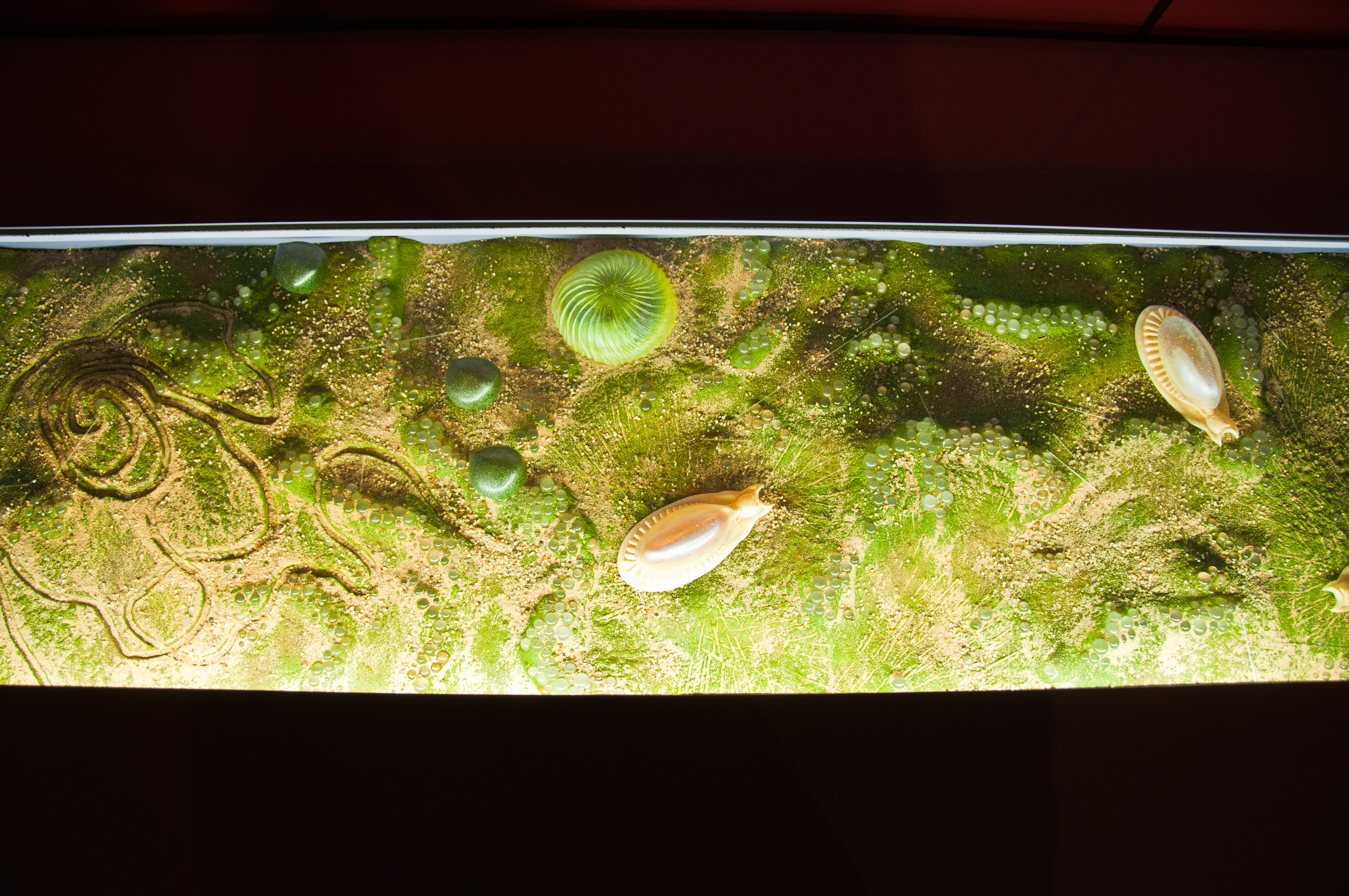
A detailed diorama of Kimberella quadrata (pink animals on the right) along with simple traces of animal movement (lowered lines on the left)

All of the fossils are oval in outline. Elongated specimens illustrate that the organism was capable of stretching in an anterior-posterior direction, perhaps by as much as a factor of two. Like many other specimens found in the White Sea, the most common type of symmetry observed appears to be bilateral; with little to no sign of any of the kinds of radial symmetry found in Cnidarians, the group that includes jellyfish, sea anemones and hydras. The Australian fossils were originally described as a type of jellyfish, but this is inconsistent with the bilateral symmetry observed in the fossils. The White Sea fossils and the surrounding sediments also show that Kimberella lived on the surface of the sea-floor.

Kimberella had a dorsal covering that has been described as a (non-mineralized) "soft shell"; in larger specimens, this reached up to 15 cm in length, 5–7 cm in width, and 3–4 cm in height; with a minimum length of 2–3 mm.

The shell was stiff but flexible, and appears to not have been mineralized, becoming tougher as it grew larger (and presumably thicker) in more mature specimens. The deformation observed in elongated and folded specimens illustrates that the shell was highly malleable; perhaps, rather than a single integument, it consisted of an aggregation of mineralised sclerites. At the highest point was a hood-like structure, forming what is thought to be the front. In some specimens, the inner surface of the shell bears stripes spanning the width of the creature; these may represent points of muscle attachment. Similar stripes around the edge of the shell may have been connected to muscles that retracted the foot into the shell.

The long axis of the organism is marked by a raised ridge; the middle axis is slightly humped. Kimberella's body had no visible segmentation but had a series of repeated "modules". Each module included a well-developed band of dorso-ventral muscles running from the top to the single, broad, muscular "foot", and smaller, transverse ventral muscles laterally across the underside of the body. The combination of these dorso-ventral and transverse ventral muscle bands enabled Kimberella to move by rippling its foot.

The body also had a frilled fringe that may have been part of the animal's respiratory system, performing a function similar to that of gills. The fact that the fringe extended well beyond the shell may indicate that Kimberella's "gills" were inefficient and needed a large area, or that there were no effective predators on Kimberella and the shell's main function was to provide a platform for the muscles.

== Ecology ==
Kimberella dwelt in shallow waters (up to tens of meters in depth), sharing the calm, well-oxygenated sea floor with photosynthetic organisms and microbial mats. Assemblages bearing Kimberella often also bear fossils of Andiva, Yorgia, Dickinsonia, Tribrachidium and Charniodiscus, suggesting that it lived alongside these organisms.

Kimberella probably grazed on microbial mats, but a selective predatory habit cannot be ruled out. Fossilized gut content seems to confirm it was grazing on bentic bacteria and algae, the latter having gone through their own ecological "big bang" 650 million years ago in the marine ecosystem, providing a more nutrient rich diet for early animals. Fedonkin reckons that as it ate, it moved "backwards"; the trail thus created was destroyed by the subsequent grazing activity. Conversely, Gehling et al. claim that it moved 'forwards'. Fans of grooves are often found radiating from the "head" end of the organism; these indicate that the organism stayed in one place, and raked the surface of the microbial mat towards it by extension of its head, which bore two "teeth". Gehling et al. reconstruct Kimberella as having a long neck that operated like the arm of a digger, rotating about an axis perpendicular to the sea floor in order to produce the sweep of the fan, and rotating towards and away from the animal to scrape food from the substrate to the mouth. In one community Kimberella has been shown to be avoiding its grazing traces, demonstrating complex sensory behaviour.

The lack of evidence of asexual reproduction suggests that the organisms reproduced sexually. Budding or fission has never been observed.

The waters in which Kimberella dwelt were occasionally disturbed by sandy currents, caused when sediments were whipped up by storms or meltwater discharge, and washed over the creatures. In response to this stress, the organisms appear to have retracted their soft parts into their shells; apparently they could not move fast enough to outrun the currents. Some organisms survived the current, and attempted to burrow out of the sand that had been deposited above them; some unsuccessful attempts can be seen where juveniles were fossilised at the end of a burrow a few centimetres long.

== Preservation ==
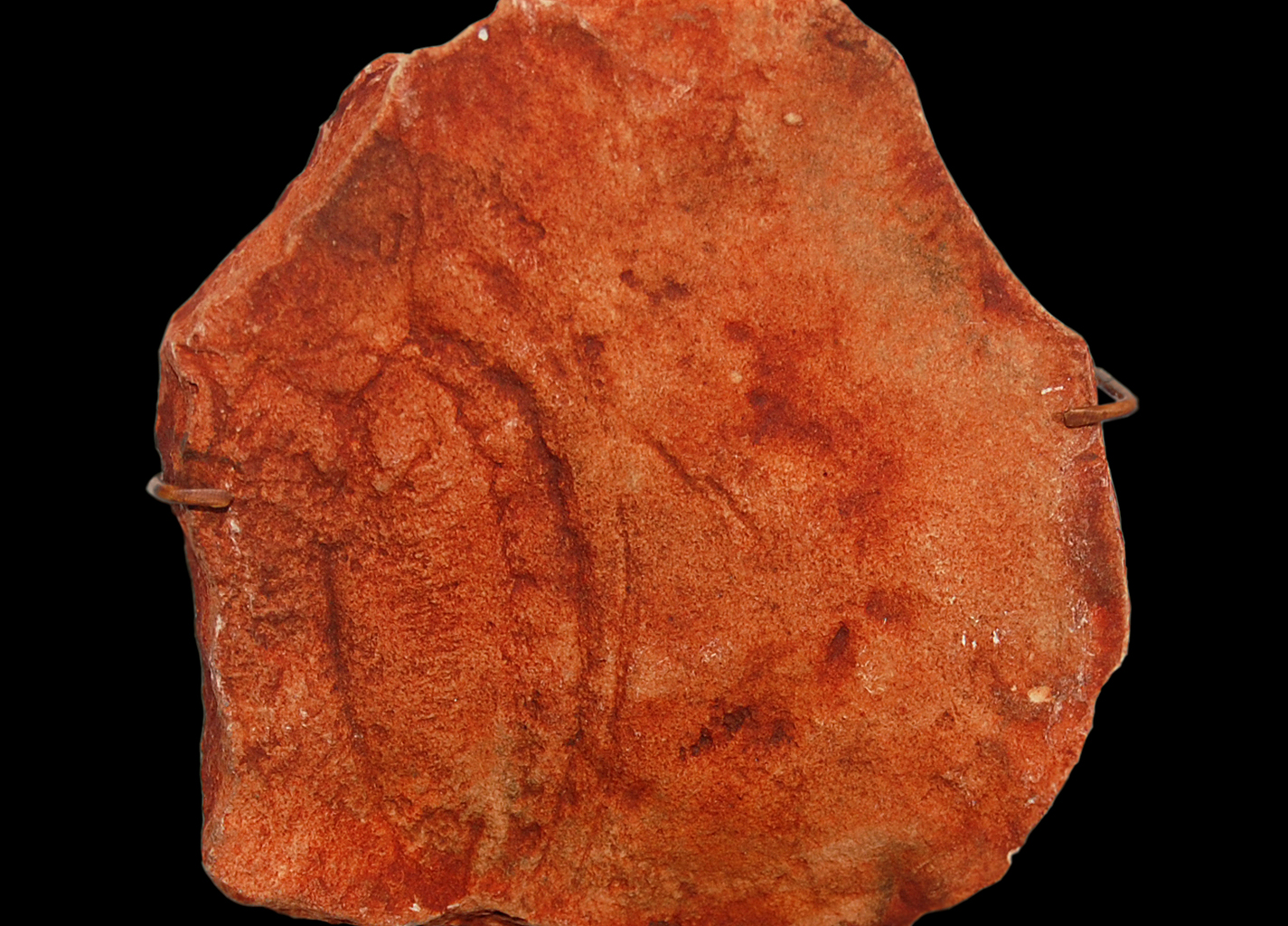
A fossil of Kimberella which can be hardly distinguished from the sediments it was preserved in

Kimberella fossils are generally preserved on top of clay-rich beds and beneath sandy beds. All fossils are preserved as depressions in the bases of beds, implying that the organism, although not mineralised, was firm enough to resist being crushed as sediment accumulated above it; as the soft parts of the organism decayed, the soft muds underneath would be squeezed up into the shell, preserving the shape of the organism.

Preservation of most specimens was made possible by the fast sedimentation that quickly cut the organism off from seawater; it may also have been enhanced by the decay products of the rotting organism, which could have helped the overlying sediment to mineralise and harden. It has been suggested that a mucus trail produced by the organism may have assisted its preservation, but experiments suggest that mucus disintegrates too easily to play a role in binding sediment together.

== Classification ==
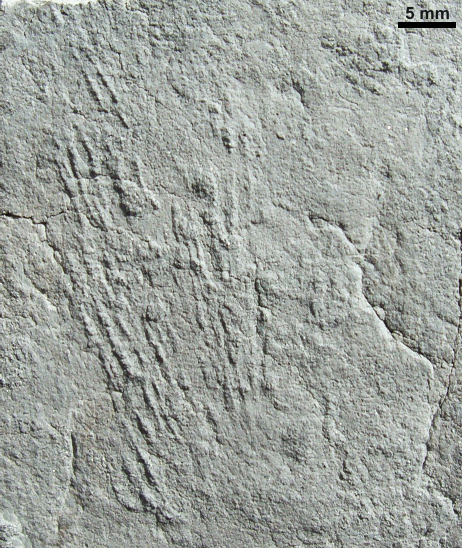
Kimberichnus teruzzii grazing traces left by Kimberella while it fed

All the Kimberella fossils found so far are assigned to one species, K. quadrata. The first specimens were discovered in Australia in 1959. They were originally classified as jellyfish by Martin Glaessner and Mary Wade in 1966, and then as box jellyfish by Wade in 1972, a view that remained popular until the fossils of the White sea region were discovered; these prompted a reinterpretation. Research on these specimens by Mikhail Fedonkin, initially with Benjamin M. Waggoner in 1997, led to Kimberella being recognised as the oldest well-documented triploblastic bilaterian organism — not a jellyfish at all.

So far, Kimberella fossils show no sign of a radula, the toothed chitinous "tongue" that is the diagnostic feature of modern molluscs, excluding bivalves. Since radulae are very rarely preserved in fossil molluscs, its absence does not necessarily mean that K. quadrata did not have one. The rocks in the immediate vicinity of Kimberella fossils bear scratch marks that have been compared to those made by the radulae of molluscs as they graze on microbial mats. These traces, named Radulichnus and Kimberichnus, have been interpreted as circumstantial evidence for the presence of a radula. In conjunction with the univalve shell, this has been taken to indicate Kimberella was a mollusc or very closely related to molluscs. In 2001 and 2007, Fedonkin suggested that the feeding mechanism might be a retractable proboscis with hook-like organs at its end. Kimberella's feeding apparatus appears to differ significantly from the typical mollusc radula, and this demonstrates that Kimberella is at best a stem-group mollusc. Notably, the scratch marks indicate that the 'teeth' were dragged towards the organism, not pushed away as in molluscs, and that the maximum impact on the sediment was when the mouthpart was furthest from the organism. The direction of grazing is also backwards, as opposed to forwards as in molluscs. Furthermore, the constant width of grooves implies stereoglossy – a trait that is very derived in molluscs. It has been argued that the shape of the feeding traces is incompatible with a radula, and that despite the molluscan body form, the lack of a radula places Kimberella well outside the molluscan crown group. Butterfield points out that plenty of other groups of organisms bear structures capable of making similar marks.

Taken together, sceptics doubt that the available evidence is enough to reliably identify Kimberella as a mollusc or near-mollusc, and suggest that it is presumptuous to call it anything more than a "possible" mollusc, or even just a "probable bilaterian", with some authors arguing that there is no clear evidence of Kimberella's affinities beyond being an animal.

A possible known relative of Kimberella is Solza margarita from Russia. Some use the grouping "Kimberellomorpha" for those two genera, and some even consider that Solza is a taphonomic variety of Kimberella.

== Theoretical importance ==
The Cambrian explosion is an apparently rapid increase in the variety of basic body structures of animals in the Early Cambrian period, starting after 543 million years ago and finishing before 518 million years ago. A few of the Early Cambrian fossils were already known in the mid-19th century, and Charles Darwin saw the apparently sudden appearance and diversification of animals as one of the main objections that could be made against his theory of evolution by natural selection.

The majority of animals more complex than jellyfish and other cnidarians are split into two groups, the protostomes and deuterostomes. The mollusc-like features of Kimberella strongly suggest that it was a member of the protostomes. If so, this means that the protostome and deuterostome lineages must have split some time before Kimberella appeared — at least 558 million years ago, and hence well before the start of the Cambrian 538.8 million years ago. Even if it is not a protostome, it is widely accepted as a member of the more inclusive bilaterian clade. Since fossils of rather modern-looking cnidarians have been found in the Doushantuo lagerstätte, the cnidarian and bilaterian lineages would have diverged well over 580 million years ago.

== See also ==
- List of Ediacaran genera
