= Anfesta =

Anfesta Temporal range: Ediacaran, around 555 Ma
- Anfesta and Beltanelliformis. Fig. A. Anfesta stankovskii Fig. B. Beltanelliformis brunsae

Scientific classification
- Kingdom: Animalia
- Phylum: †Trilobozoa
- Family: †Albumaresidae
- Genus: †Anfesta; Fedonkin, 1984
- Species: †A. stankovskii

Binomial name
- †Anfesta stankovskii Fedonkin, 1984

Extinct genus of marine invertebrates

Anfesta stankovskii is a tri-radially symmetrical fossil animal that lived on the late Ediacaran (Vendian) seafloor. It is a member of the extinct group Trilobozoa.

== Etymology ==
The generic and specific names of Anfesta stankovskii honour the Arkhangelsk geologist Anatoliy F. Stankovskii.

== Occurrence ==
Fossils of Anfesta stankovskii are known from deposits of the Verkhovka and Yorga formations on the Karakhta River in Onega Peninsula and Zimnii Bereg (Winter Coast) of the White Sea, Arkhangelsk Region, Russia.

== Description ==
Anfesta represents a flattened, hemispherical form with three-fold symmetry. At the centre of the organism, 3 elongate and sausage-like lobes radiate from the centre and are spaced out from each other by 120 degrees, making the animal always divisible into 3 parts and the lobes becoming rounded at both edges. The same lobes bifurcate twice near both of their ends. In some specimens of A. stankovskii, a large amount of furrows (originally interpreted as tentacles) appear, which are similar in appearance to Albumares and Skinnera (Mostly Albumares). The diameter of Anfesta is thought to be 18 mm (0.71 in), with the length of the lobes reaching up to 5 mm (0.20 in), and with the width of them being up to 1.3 mm (0.051 in).

=== Reconstruction and affinity ===
Anfesta was originally described by Mikhail Fedonkin as a free-swimming scyphozoa-like medusa. The branched furrows on the fossil were interpreted as imprints of a system of internal radial canals, and the three oval lobes as imprints of gonads.

A year later, Fedonkin transferred such fossil animals as Anfesta, Albumares and Tribrachidium to the separate group Trilobozoa, populated by three-lobed, radially symmetric, coelenterate-grade animals that only superficially resemble cnidarians. Originally, Trilobozoa was established as a class within the phylum Coelenterata, but since Coelenterata was divided into separate phyla - Cnidaria and Ctenophora - the Trilobozoa have been transferred to rank of phylum.

According to the latest research, Anfesta was a soft-bodied benthic organism that temporarily attached (but did not adhere) to the substrate of its habitat (microbial mats). Most, if not all, fossil specimens are of an imprint of the upper side of the animal body, with some elements of its external and internal anatomy visible to the naked eye. The branched furrows on the fossil are imprints of radial grooves on the animal's surface, while the three central lobes are imprints of cavities within the body. Presumably, this system of grooves and cavities could be related to the collection and digestion of food particles.

== See also ==
- List of Ediacaran genera
