= Lobodiscus =

Lobodiscus Temporal range: 550–545 Ma

Scientific classification
- Kingdom: Animalia
- Phylum: †Trilobozoa
- Genus: †Lobodiscus; Zhao et al., 2024
- Species: †L. tribrachialis

Binomial name
- †Lobodiscus tribrachialis Zhao et al., 2024

Extinct genus of trilobozoan

Lobodiscus is an extinct genus of Ediacaran trilobozoans from China, discovered early in 2024. The genus contains a single species, Lobodiscus tribrachialis.

== Description ==
Lobodiscus is a large trilobozoan measuring roughly 3.5 cm (1.4 in) in diameter, with a shield-like profile and a raised centre. Its three radiating branches surround a small depression, possibly an apical pit, and are separated by roughly 120°, with the three lobes in-between having a dense mesh of bifurcating ridges radiating from the centre of the organism. It seems to be closely related to Anfesta and Albumares, as they have similar morphologies including bifurcating ridges and long structures exhibiting glide reflection that may represent digestive cavities. However, unlike Albumares, Lobodiscus does not show distal separation in its lobes, and has far larger "digestive cavities" than both hypothetical relatives, as well as these cavities not being glide reflected in Anfesta.

== Etymology ==
The genus name derives from lobus, meaning "lobed" and discus, meaning "disc", denoting the disc-like body with radiating lobes. Its specific name, tribrachialis, means "three-armed" referring to its trilateral symmetry.

== Occurrence ==
Lobodiscus has only been found from the holotype, KGS00228, from the Dengying Formation of Yunnan, China. As only one fossil has been found, it may be a pseudofossil. However as this explanation is unlikely due to geological and morphological reasons, it is regarded as a trilobozoan until sufficient evidence for the contrary is provided.

Estimated at 546 Ma, Lobodiscus would be the youngest known trilobozoan, being their first occurrence in the Nama biotic assemblage (550–539 Ma). It is also the first likely animal fossil from this locality.
