= Solza (disambiguation) =

Solza is a municipality in Italy.

Solza may also refer to:

- Solza (animal) (Solza margarita), a species of Ediacaran animal
- Solza River, a river in Arkhangelsk region, Russia
