= Gehlingia =

Gehlingia Temporal range: Ediacaran
- Artists reconstruction of Gehlingia dibrachida (note deep groove and tubular structures). Reconstruction from McMenamin and McMenamin, 1994, Hypersea: Life on Land modified by Heather Winkelmann.

Scientific classification
- Domain: Eukaryota
- Kingdom: Animalia
- Phylum: incertae sedis
- Genus: †Gehlingia; McMenamin, 1998
- Species: †G. dibrachida

Binomial name
- †Gehlingia dibrachida McMenamin, 1998

Enigmatic fossil taxa of South Australia

Gehlingia dibrachida is a species of enigmatic Ediacaran organism from South Australia described by Mark McMenamin in 1998. Gehlingia has been described as having many characteristics of petalonamids, although it has been classified as a rather close relative of the Tribrachidium. The overall shape of Gehlingia contradicts this affinity, however, with its shape being a more bilaterally symmetrical one although the basic structure similar to that of Tribrachidium appears in Gehlingia as separate branches extending into bifurcating minor branches along with "thumb structures" that are apparent in Tribrachidium in the form of side bulges on an axis.

== Etymology ==
The generic name honours the Australian palaeontologist specialising in Ediacaran fossils, James G. Gehling.

== Description ==
Gehlingia dibrachida represents a frond-like bilaterally symmetric organism with two fronds with each half of them having a swollen axis on an inner edge. The organism's axis bifurcated once and bifurcates towards the outer edge of its two fronds. Similar deformations occur in both Tribrachidium and Gehlingia, some notable ones being delaying of the bifurcation and tubular structures being visible between the striae. A number of tubular structures emanate from the axis and are often either straight or curved. A deep groove separates the two axes. The entire animal is estimated to have been 8 centimeters (3.1 in) in length and 3.1 centimeters (1.2 in) in width. The tubular structures of the two "fronds" end abruptly and in turn form a smooth edge to the organism.

In Gehlingia (as well as Tribrachidium) there are "thumb" structures that appear to have been positioned on the left and right side of the main branch. In Tribrachidium, the thumb structures are visible as side bulges which extend out of an axis.

== See also ==
- List of Ediacaran genera
- Tribrachidium
