= Tiernavia =

Tiernavia Temporal range: Cambrian Series 2

Scientific classification
- Domain: Eukaryota
- Kingdom: Animalia
- Phylum: Cnidaria (?)
- Genus: †Tiernavia
- Species: †T. tiernae

Binomial name
- †Tiernavia tiernae Fedonkin in Fedonkin Liñán and Perejón,1985

Extinct genus of marine invertebrates

Tiernavia is a monospecific genus of probable metazoan interpreted as a coelenterate (or even a cnidarian). It is known from the Cambrian (Ovetian, Lower Cambrian), and is preserved as casts in the Torreárboles Formation in the Sierra de Córdoba, Spain.
