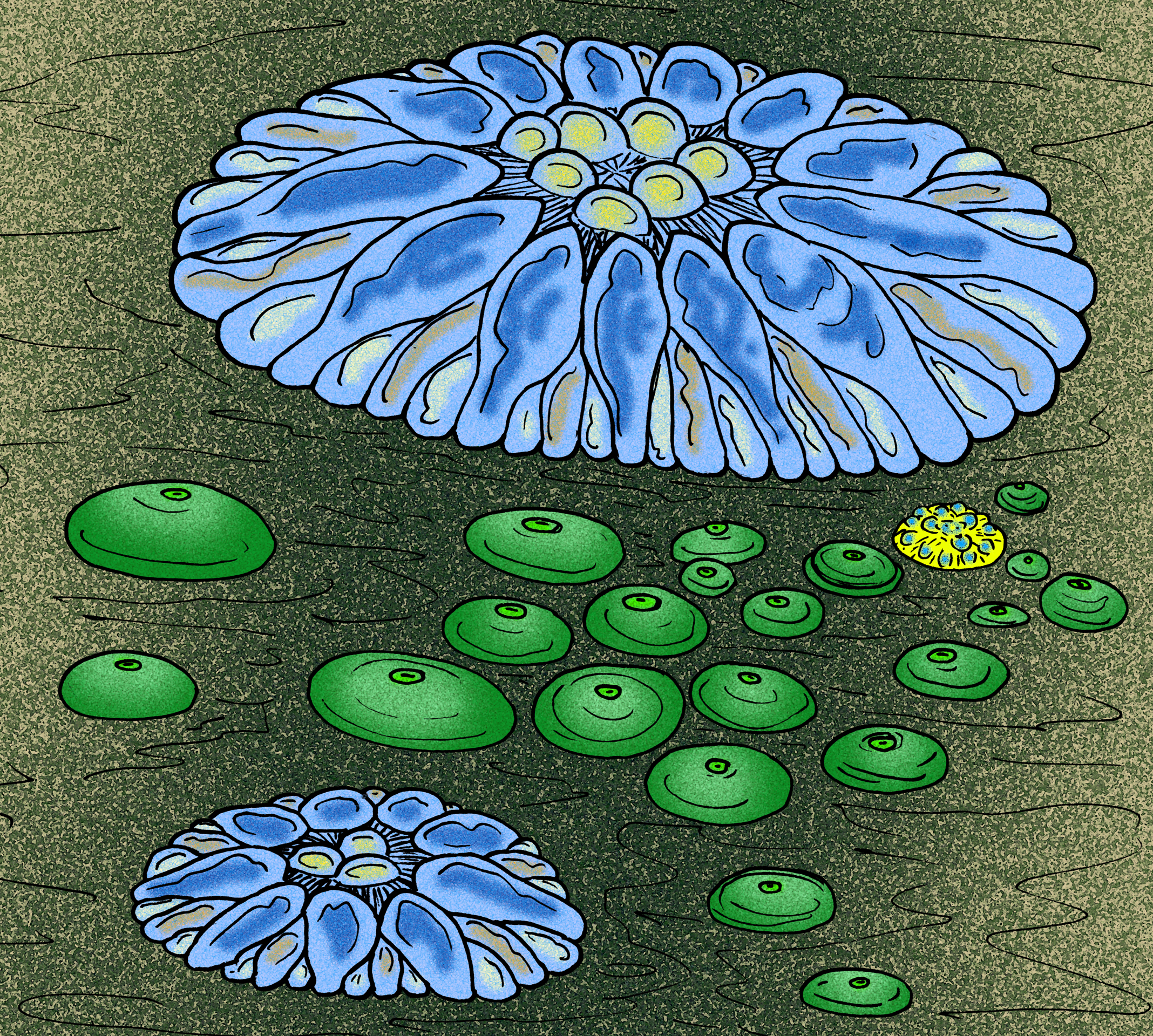
- Artist's restoration of H. brueri

Scientific classification
- Kingdom: Animalia
- Phylum: †Trilobozoa
- Genus: †Hallidaya; Wade, 1969
- Species: †H. brueri

Binomial name
- †Hallidaya brueri Wade 1969

= Hallidaya =

Hallidaya brueri Temporal range: Late Ediacaran, around 558–550 Ma

Extinct species of simple animal

The Ediacaran fossil Hallidaya, a close relative of Skinnera lived in Belomorian (559-550 Ma) of the Late Ediacaran period prior to the Cambrian explosion and thrived in the marine strata on the ocean floor of what is now considered Australia. These fossils were disk-shaped organisms that were slightly dome shaped with tri-radial symmetry. These Ediacaran organisms thrived by living in low-energy inner shelf, in the wave- and current-agitated shoreface, and in the high-energy distributary systems.

== Description ==
The Hallidaya is a species of trilobozoan which has the shape of small circular-shaped fossils preserved as a mold. They are soft-bodied creatures approximately 4–32 mm (0.16–1.26 in) in diameter with an average of 10 mm (0.39 in) with a height of 2 mm (0.079 in) shaped like a dome. They have three central depressions that are connected to smaller pouch-shaped depressions around the perimeter of the disk by canals. The center depressions are speculated to be their stomach.

== Environmental conditions ==
During the Belomorian of the Late Ediacaran other organisms who lived on the ocean floor diversified their appearances through frondomorphs, tribrachiomorphs, and bilateralomorphs. Also vendobionts began migrating from the inner shelf into higher energy environments. Hallidaya became extinct in the Kotlinian (550-540 Ma) of the Late Ediacaran after there was an increase of migration to high-energy areas by burrowing animals. These Ediacaran organisms were progressively outcompeted by bilaterians who anchored into the microbial mat of the ocean floor with their basal bulbs and possibly evolved a symbiosis with photoautotrophic or chemoautophrophic microorganisms.

There were also Ediacara fan-shaped sets of paired scratches found from the Eidacara Member of the Rawnsley Quartzite in South Australia, Kimberichnus teruzzii. This fossil showed signs of a Kimerella quadrata's trace maker whose death occurs at the same time as the mat excavation traces in South Australia and Russia. Their co-occurrence and systematic feeding traces in the Ediacara biota record supports the theory that bilaterians existed globally before the Cambrian explosion.

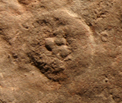
Ediacaran fossil Hallidaya brueri from the Ediacara Member of the Rawnsley Quartzite in Crisp Gorge, Flinder Ranges, South Australia (Retallack 2018)

== Taxonomy ==
The Hallidaya is a genus of the Trilobozoa taxon, but their further relationships are incertae sedis. These fossils were mainly disk-shaped organisms with tri-radial symmetry.

== Discovery ==
Fossils of Hallidaya were found by A.L. Halliday and M.M Bruner in the Mount Stuart Formation near Mount Skinner in Northern Territory, Australia. They marked off three locations and labelled them Mt. Skinner No. 1-3. Most of the fossils found were discovered between locations Mt. S2 and Mt. S3. These fossils were given to Mary Wade who worked in the Department of Geology at the University of Adelaide. Wade was able to separate the fossils into two types, Form A and Form B with there being twice as many fossils that conformed to Form A when compared to Form B. Wade named Form A Hallidaya brueri and Form B Skinnera brooksi.

=== Taphonomy ===
The fossils were found flattened in a bedding of maroon and green shale with subgreywacks, impure siltstone, and claystones. They were parallel to the bedding plane and emerged with their dorsal surface facing upwards.
