= Skinnera =

Skinnera brooksi
- Fossil

Scientific classification
- Kingdom: Animalia
- Phylum: †Trilobozoa
- Genus: †Skinnera; Wade, 1969
- Species: †S. brooksi

Binomial name
- †Skinnera brooksi Wade, 1969

Fossil taxon

Skinnera is an Ediacaran-aged fossil found in Australia. It was discovered by A.L. Halliday and M.M. Bruer near Mount Skinner in the locality of Anmatjere, in the Northern Territory of Australia some time before 1969. Mary Wade of the University of Adelaide originally formally described Skinnera as a medusa.

== Description ==
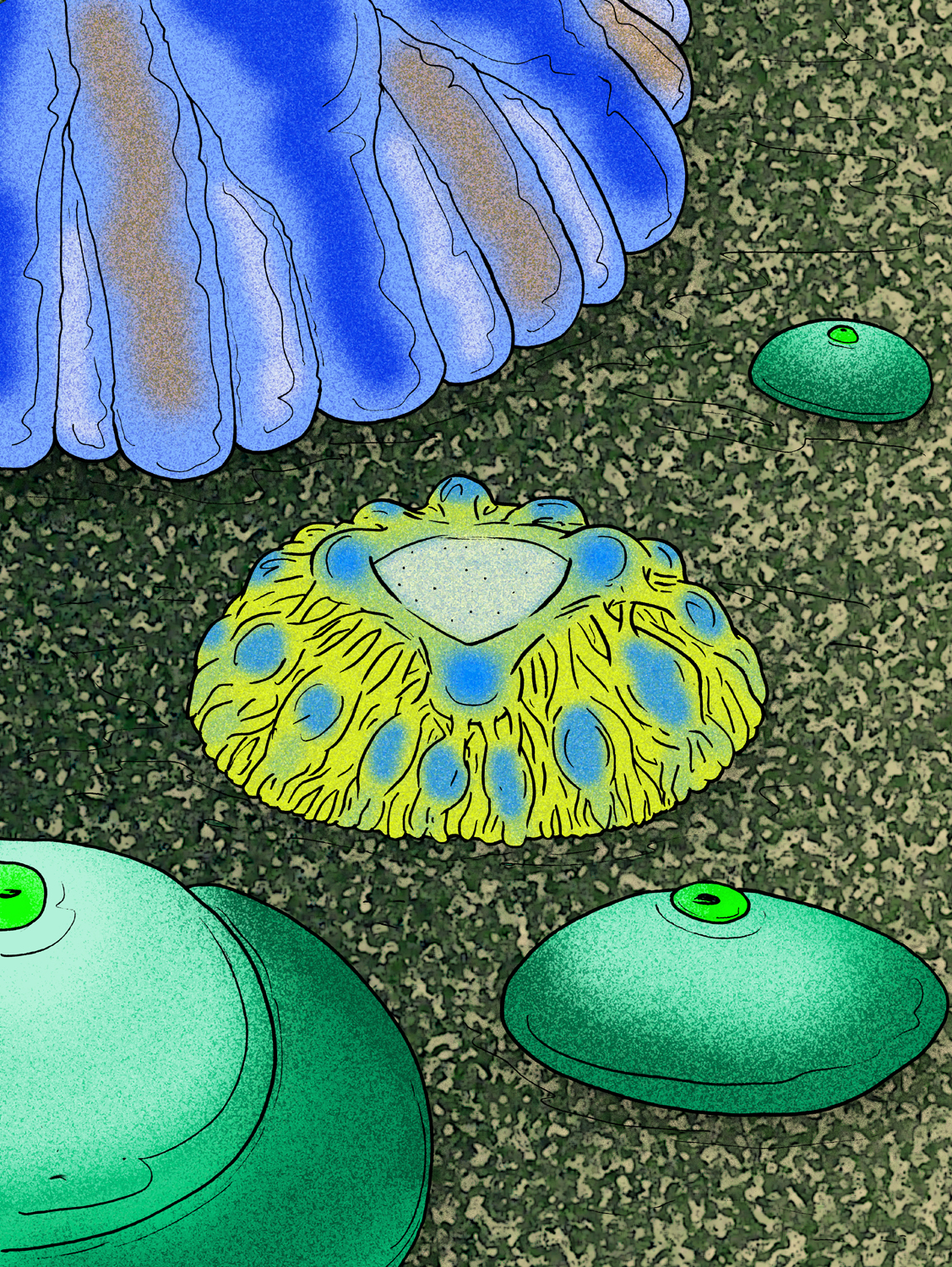
Artist restoration of Skinnera brooksi

Skinnera is a small, disk-shaped fossil preserved as a composite mould. Specimens range in diameter from 3.9–32 mm (0.15–1.26 in) most are about 10 mm (0.39 in) across. They are slightly domed and all approximately 2 mm (0.079 in) tall. The fossils have three-fold symmetry and are characterized by three large, pouch-shaped depressions in the center which are speculated to be the stomach. These central depressions are connected to an outer rim of approximately 15 smaller pouch-shaped depressions along the perimeter of the disk by canals,

== Diversity ==
There is only one known species, S. brooksi.

== Discovery ==
A.L. Halliday, geologist, and M.M. Bruer, field assistant, were on a geological expedition near Mount Skinner while working for Kennecott Explorations, Pty. Ltd. when they found fossiliferous deposits near the mountain. They marked off three locations, Mt. Skinner No. 1-3. The majority of fossils were found between sites Mt. S2 and Mt. S3. Halliday and Bruer notified Mary Wade of the Department of Geology at the University of Adelaide. Wade collected additional fossils aided by Halliday and Bruer. Two types of fossils were found which Wade designated as Form A and Form B. There were about twice as many fossils of Form A than Form B. Wade named Form A Hallidaya brueri, for the discoverers, and Form B Skinnera brooksi for the location. Wade (1969) described Skinnera as a medusa, though, other sources classify it as a trilobozoan related to Tribrachidium and Hallidaya.

== Distribution ==
Skinnera is known from three sites in the Northern Territory of Australia near Mount Skinner. Fossils were primarily found between sites Mt. Skinner 2 and Mt. Skinner 3.

== Taphonomy ==
The fossils were found in flaggy bedding of maroon and green shales with subgreywacks, impure siltstone, and claystones. The fossils are found flattened, parallel to the bedding plane with the dorsal surface up.

== Significance ==
S. brooksi was described by Mary Wade, a leading female paleontologist at the time in a male dominated field.

== See also ==
- List of Ediacaran Genera
