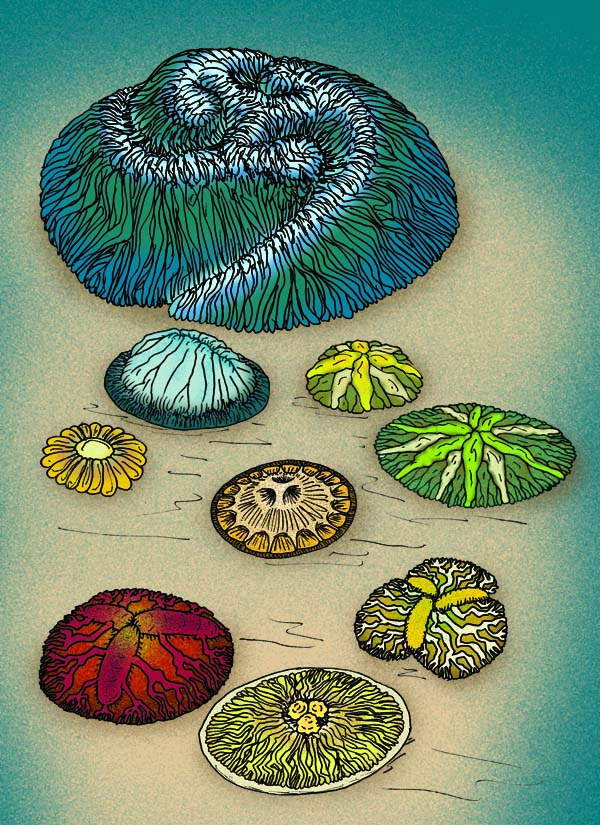
- The many members of the Trilobozoa. (clockwise from top): Tribrachidium heraldium, Rugoconites enigmaticus, Rugoconites tenuirugosus, Albumares brunsae, Hallidaya brueri, Anfesta stankovskii, Lorenzinites rarus, Wigwamiella enigmatica and Skinerra brooksi.

Scientific classification
- Kingdom: Animalia
- Subkingdom: Eumetazoa
- Phylum: †Trilobozoa; Fedonkin, 1985 [nom. transl. Runnegar, 1992 ex Class Trilobozoa Fedonkin, 1985]

Genera
- †Albumares Fedonkin, 1976; †Anfesta Fedonkin, 1984; †Hallidaya Wade 1969; †Lobodiscus(?) Zhao et al. 2024; †Rugoconites Glaessner & Wade 1966; †Skinnera Wade, 1969; †Tribrachidium Glaessner, 1959; For minor descriptions, see text

Synonyms
- Tribrachiomorpha Fedonkin; Triradialomorpha Fedonkin et al

= Trilobozoa =

Trilobozoa Temporal range: Late Ediacaran, around 557–545 Ma

Extinct phylum of triradially symmetrical animals

Trilobozoa, from Ancient Greek τρεῖς (treîs), meaning "three", λοβός (lobós), meaning "lobe", and ζῷον (zôion), meaning "animal", is a phylum of extinct, sessile animals that were originally classified into the Cnidaria. The basic body plan of trilobozoans is often a triradial or radial sphere-shaped form with lobes radiating from its centre. Fossils of trilobozoans are restricted to marine strata of the Late Ediacaran period.

== History and interpretations ==
Originally, both M.A. Fedonkin and B.N. Runnegar presumed that there were 2–3 families within the Trilobozoa, those families being Albumaresidae (Fedonkin, 1985) and Tribrachididae (Runnegar, 1992). Although, affinities with the Conulariida were made because the conulariids possess similar three-fold symmetry. Fedonkin originally classified the Trilobozoa as a class of the phylum Coelenterata.

Most of the members of what is now the modern day classification for Trilobozoa were thought to have originally been free swimming jellyfish. Tribrachidium was once interpreted as a edrioasteroid echinoderm, although with the discovery of the related Albumares and Anfesta (along with better-preserved White Sea specimens), it became apparent to M. Fedonkin that all of the organisms formed one phylum (originally class) of triradially symmetrical enigmatic organisms from the Ediacaran. The eventual split of Coelenterata into the phyla Cnidaria and Ctenophora led the Trilobozoa to obtain a phylum level of affinities.

The members of the Trilobozoa are now thought to be sessile, benthic organisms of unknown affinities, and are a subject open for interpretations and debate.

== Description ==
Trilobozoans had a triradial shield-like body that had three antimeres which consisted of a cluster of grooves on their outer surface and within their inner cavity. Most of the members of the Trilobozoa possessed bifurcating concave areas internally that were all separated by sharp ridges. These structures were more likely stiff and cuticular rather than elastic internal bodies or membranes even though those structures may have been resistant, they also could have corresponded to collapsed chambers that can be observed within the related genera Albumares and Anfesta. In Tribrachidium, the sediment preserving the animal penetrated from above only within areas between those organs. The spiral-like orientation of the internal bodies of trilobozoans suggests that they were modified from an originally longitudinal to the axis which resulted in the deposition of the organs.

=== Albumares ===
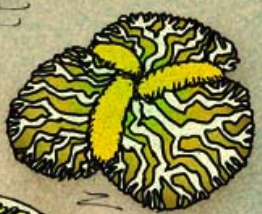
Albumares brunsae Fedonkin, 1976

Albumares brunsae represents a form first described from the White Sea of Russia by Mikhail A. Fedonkin in 1976. In life, Albumares most likely had an umbrella-like shape with triradial symmetry along with three ridges radiating from its centre. Fossils of Albumares are known from Russia and South Australia and preserve 100 small (0.15 millimeters (0.0059 in) each) marginal tentacles. From the centre of the lobes arise three canals that split at least 4 times across the body. The split canals then split until they reach the outer margin of the body. The diameter of the body is 13 millimeters (0.51 in), the length of the lobes are 5 millimeters (0.20 in) maximum. Albumares are similar and may be a close relative of Anfesta.

=== Anfesta ===
Anfesta stankovskii represents a small (18 millimeters (0.71 in)) hemispherical-shaped form with flattened, three-fold symmetry. Similarly to Albumares, three long sausage-shaped lobes radiate from its centre that are all separated by an angle of about 120 degrees. The lobes taper at both their proximal and distal ends, which divide the organism into a number of narrow bodies that are divisible by three. Some specimens from both Australia and Russia preserve tentacles (canals) similar to that of Albumares. Unlike Albumares and Skinnera, Anfesta is more oval-shaped and discoidal rather than being dominantly tri-lobate. The length of the lobes are 5 millimeters (0.20 in) with the width reaching up to 1.3 millimeters (0.051 in).

=== Hallidaya ===
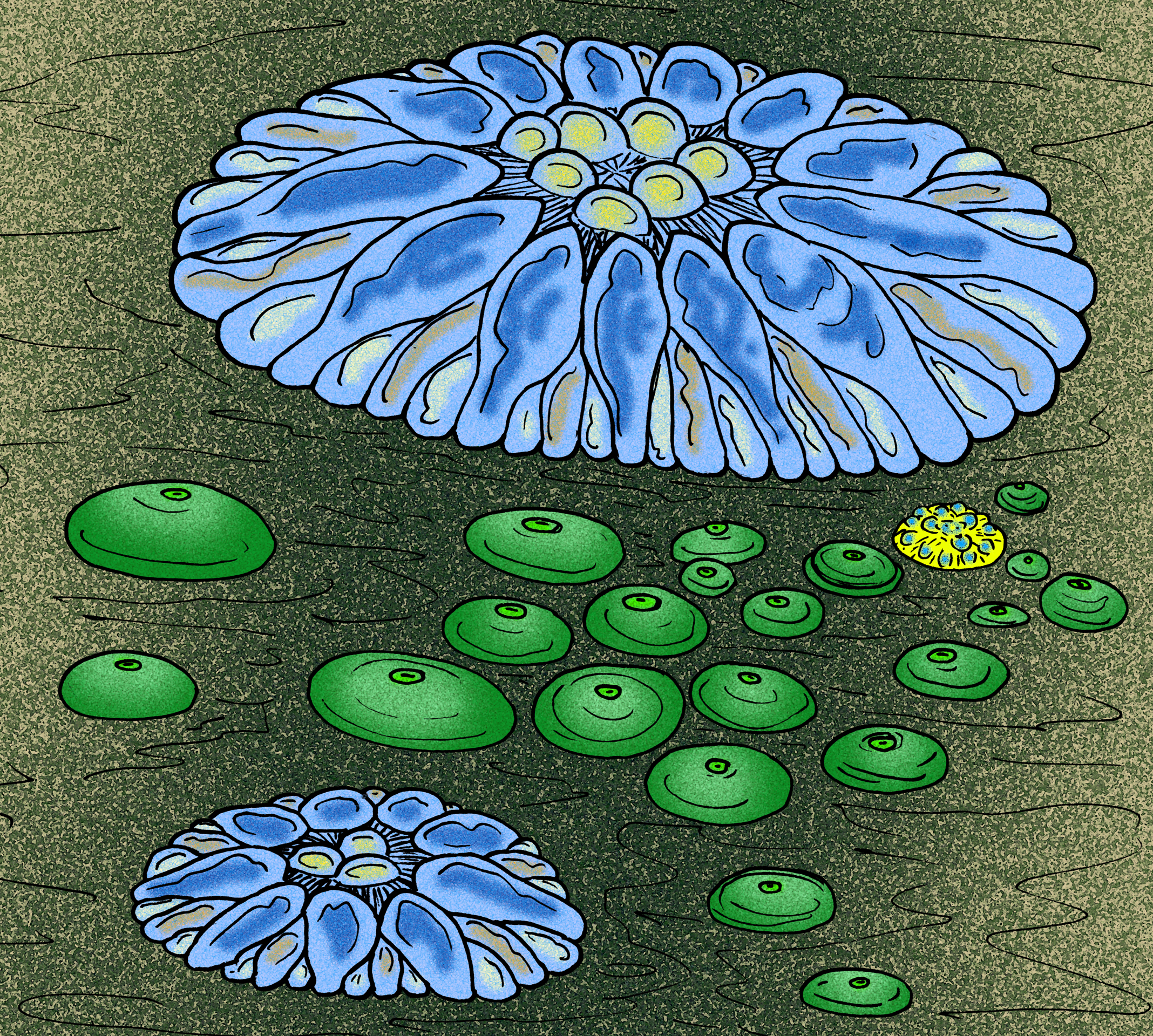
Hallidaya brueri Wade 1969

Hallidaya brueri constitutes as a discoidal form that is restricted to Mount Skinner of the Northern Territory of Australia. The fossils were preserved as disc-shaped moulds on the sandstone. The fossils typically range up to 4 to 32 mm (0.16 to 1.26 in) in diameter with a height of 2 mm (0.079 in). Specimens commonly show three central depressions connected by a much smaller, pouch-shaped one around the perimeter of the disk by multiple canals radiating from its centre. Hallidaya and Skinnera share common morphological characteristics with each other and are most likely close relatives.

=== Rugoconites ===
Rugoconites is a genus of oval-circular-shaped preserved in high relief about 6 centimetres (2.4 in) or more in diameter. The shape of Rugoconites is different in both of its species; R. enigmaticus (Glaessner & Wade, 1966) is more dome shaped and R. tenuirugosus (Wade, 1972) is flatter although bigger. Wade (1972) interpreted the multiple lobes of Rugoconites as being tentacles. The multiple bifurcating lobes radiating from a centre served to distinguish Rugoconites from the sponge Palaeophragmodictya the lobes were then reinterpreted as being traces of a Gastrovascular system. However this idea was countered by Sepkoski (2002) who went on to actually classify the genus into the Cnidaria instead of the Porifera. Ivantstov & Fedonkin (2002) went on to classify Rugoconites into the Trilobozoa by suggesting it had triradial symmetry.

=== Skinnera ===
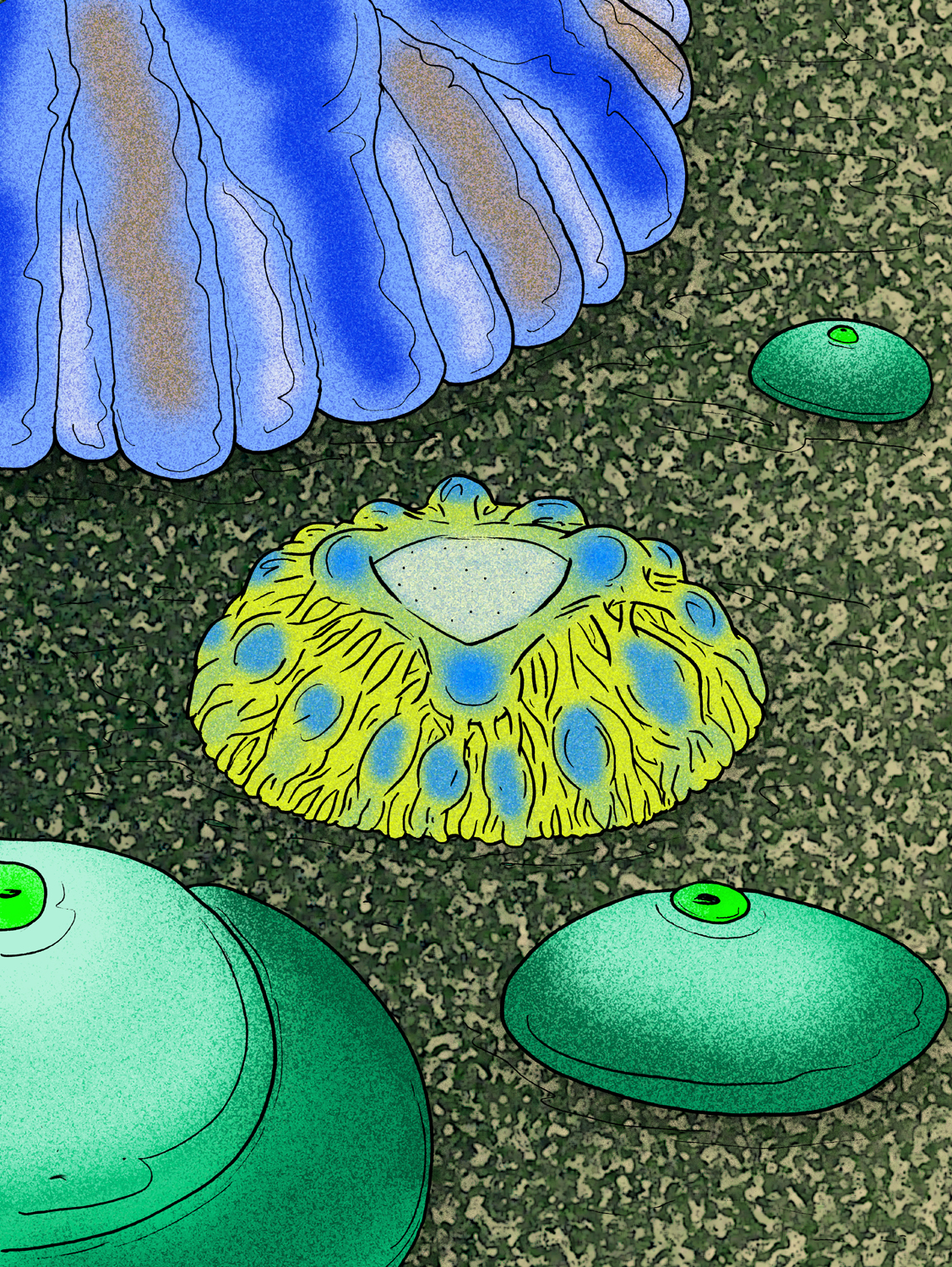
Skinnera brooksi Wade, 1969

Skinnera brooksi defines small discoidal fossils preserved as composite moulds on sandstone. Fossils are characterized by three radially arranged pouch-shaped depressions that are interpreted as a stomach similar to that seen in Hallidaya. These depressions are then connected to an outer rim by approximately 15 smaller pouches along the disk by canals. S. brooksi fossils range from 3.9 millimeters (0.15 in) to 32 millimeters (1.3 in) and are slightly domed by being 2 millimeters (0.079 in) tall. Skinnera and Hallidaya are considered to be close relatives.

=== Tribrachidium ===
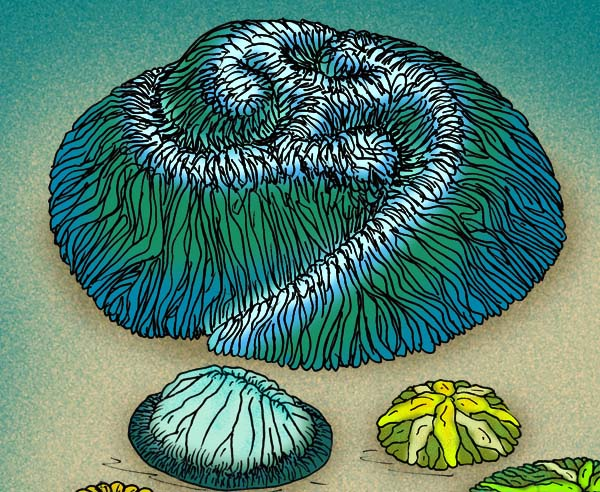
Tribrachidium heraldicum Glaessner, 1959

Tribrachidium heraldicum is a small 3 to 40 millimetres (0.12 to 1.57 in) triradially symmetrical form often preserved on the base of sandstones and often show a three-lobed, circular animal preserved in it. The central part of T. heraldicum has three hooked ridges (or arms) that make up the lobes; the arms are covered by numerous branched furrows that were interpreted as tentacles.

== See also ==
- List of Ediacaran genera – Fossilised Precambrian life forms
