= Zolotytsia =

Zolotytsia Temporal range: about 549 Ma

Scientific classification
- Kingdom: Animalia
- Phylum: †Petalonamae
- Genus: †Zolotytsia; Fedonkin, 1981
- Species: †Z. biserialis

Binomial name
- †Zolotytsia biserialis Fedonkin, 1981

Unidentified animal

Zolotytsia is an extinct genus of fossil animals from the late Ediacaran period (Vendian) which contains only one known species, Zolotytsia biserialis. Specimens of this species have been found in Russia, Ukraine and India.

== Description ==
Specimens exhibit two distinctive rows of oval-shaped structures, positioned either side of a mid-line groove, each row being divided by a deep, but narrow groove. The lack of symmetry in the oval bodies has been attributed to possible deformation after death.

== Occurrence ==
Fossils have been found in the Ust' Pinega Formation, located in Northern Russia; the Valdai Group, located in Russia; the Bernashevka Beds; the Yarishyvska Formation, located in Ukraine and in the Krol Formation, located in India.

== See also ==
- List of Ediacaran genera
