= Petalostroma =

Petalostroma Temporal range: Ediacaran

Scientific classification
- Kingdom: Animalia
- Phylum: †Petalonamae (?)
- Genus: †Petalostroma; Pflug, 1973
- Species: †P. kuibis

Binomial name
- †Petalostroma kuibis Pflug, 1973

Enigmatic Ediacaran organism

Petalostroma kuibis is a species of enigmatic fossil organism from the Ediacaran period, possibly a member of the Petalonamae, of Namibia, Dabris Formation, Farm Aar.

== Description ==
P. kuibis represents a multitude of saucer-shaped structures which are up to tens of centimetres in diameter, while also showing an irregularly wrinkled surface on the fossils collected from the Farm Aar of Namibia. Another feature P. kuibis also has is a lack of any indications that it had internal cavities.

== Theoretical importance ==
Because P. kuibis has been observed in its irregular granule microstructures, it is believed that fossil specimens of this organism may be able to, and have been used to, construct complex models of colonies within the phylum Petalonamae, signifying that it has an important role in reconstructing those animals.

== See also ==
- List of Ediacaran genera
