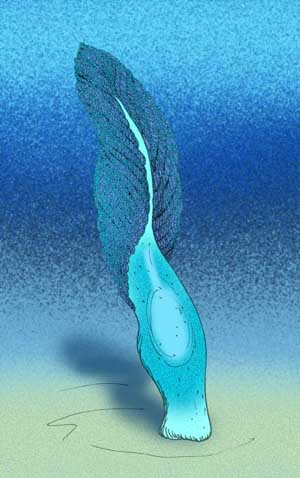
- Artist reconstruction as a sessile basal ctenophore

Scientific classification
- Kingdom: Animalia
- Phylum: †Petalonamae
- Genus: †Stromatoveris; Shu et al. 2006
- Species: †S. psygmoglena

Binomial name
- †Stromatoveris psygmoglena Shu et al. 2006

= Stromatoveris =

Stromatoveris Temporal range: 520.0–516.0 Ma Cambrian

Extinct genus of invertebrates

Stromatoveris psygmoglena is a genus of fossil organism from the Chengjiang deposits of Yunnan that was originally aligned with the fossil Charnia (strictly, the Charniomorpha) from the Ediacara biota. However, such an affinity was thought to be developmentally implausible and so S. psygmoglena was thought to be either a sessile basal ctenophore, or a sessile organism closely related to ctenophores instead. Nevertheless, a 2018 phylogenetic analysis by Jennifer Hoyal Cuthill and Jian Han indicated that Stromatoveris was a member of Animalia and closely related to ediacaran frond-like lifeforms.

== Distribution ==
Cambrian of China.
