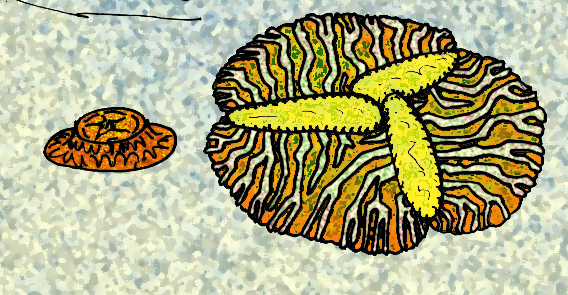
- Albumares brunsae

Scientific classification
- Kingdom: Animalia
- Phylum: †Trilobozoa
- Family: †Albumaresidae
- Genus: †Albumares; Fedonkin, 1976
- Species: †A. brunsae

Binomial name
- †Albumares brunsae Fedonkin, 1976

= Albumares =

Albumares Temporal range: 558–555 Ma

Extinct genus of soft-bodied Trilobozoan

Albumares brunsae is a tri-radially symmetrical fossil animal that lived on the late Ediacaran seafloor. It is a member of the extinct group Trilobozoa.

== Etymology ==
The generic name Albumares derives from the Latin Mare Album (White Sea). The specific name "brunsae" honors Elizabeth P. Bruns, an early 20th-century Russian geologist noted for her extensive and important research of the Upper Precambrian (Note: In stratigraphy, an upper era is a more recent period than a lower era, as exemplified by the usage of era divisions such as the Upper Paleolithic period and Lower Paleolithic period (Lower Paleolithic is an early phase of the Paleolithic period and Upper comes much later).) stratigraphy of European Russia.

== Occurrence ==
Fossils of Albumares brunsae are known from deposits in the Verkhovka Formation, Syuzma River in the Onega Peninsula of the White Sea, Arkhangelsk Region, Russia. There are reports of Albumares sp. from the Rawnsley Quartzite, Flinders Ranges in South Australia, but photographs or description of these fossils have not yet been published.

== Description ==
Albumares fossils are preserved as negative, low impressions on the bases of sandstone beds. The fossil exhibits circular, trefoil-like (three-lobe) form, and is covered by three dendritic-branched furrows and three oval lobes that radiate from the center, which are twisted into weak spirals.

The diameters of known specimens vary from 8–15 mm (0.31–0.59 in).

== Reconstruction and affinity ==
Albumares was originally described by Mikhail Fedonkin as a free-swimming scyphozoan jellyfish. The branched furrows on the fossil were interpreted as imprints of a system of internal radial canals and tentacles along the outer margin of the fossil, with the three oval lobes described as imprints of mouth lobes or gonades.

Later, with the discovery of the closely related Anfesta and with their seeming affinities to Tribrachidium, Fedonkin appointed these animals to the Trilobozoa, an extinct group of tri-radially symmetrical coelenterate-like animals that only superficially resembled cnidarians. Originally, Trilobozoa was established as a class in the phylum Coelenterata, but since Coelenterata has been divided into two separate phyla, Cnidaria and Ctenophora, Trilobozoa itself has been promoted to the rank of phylum.

According to the latest research, Albumares was a soft-bodied benthic organism that temporarily attached (but did not adhere) to the substrate of its habitat (microbial mats). Most, if not all, fossil specimens are of an imprint of the upper side of the animal's body, and often some elements of its internal structure can be discerned. The branched furrows on the fossil are imprints of radial grooves on the surface of the animal, while the three lobes in the central part of the fossil are imprints of cavities within the body. Presumably, this system of grooves and cavities could be related to the collection and digestion of food particles.

== See also ==
- List of Ediacaran genera
