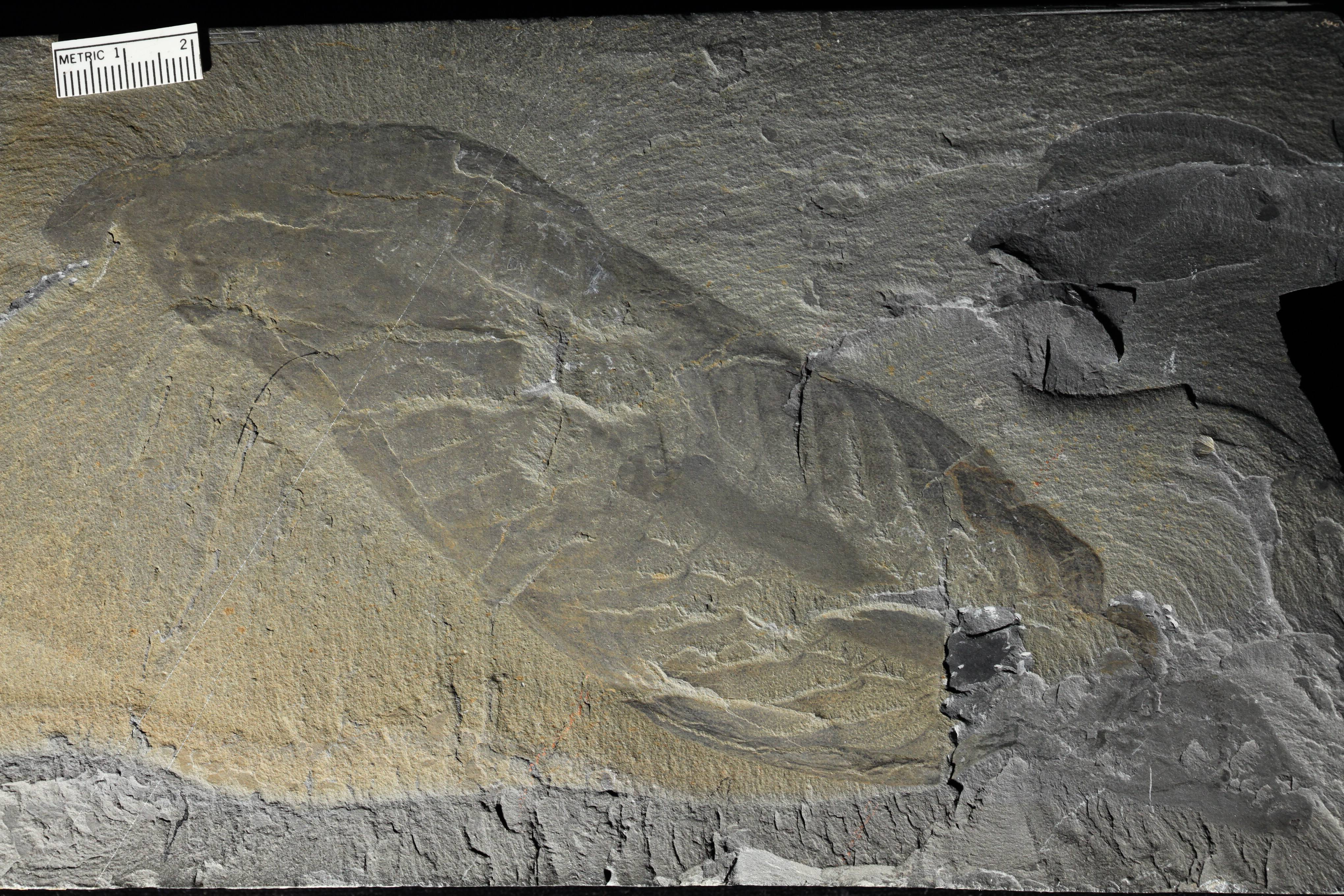
- Holotype

Scientific classification
- Kingdom: Animalia
- Phylum: †Petalonamae
- Genus: †Thaumaptilon; Conway Morris, 1993
- Species: †T. walcotti

Binomial name
- †Thaumaptilon walcotti Conway Morris, 1993

= Thaumaptilon =

Thaumaptilon Temporal range: Middle Cambrian

Genus of animals (fossil)

Thaumaptilon is a fossil genus of animals from the middle Cambrian Burgess Shale which some authors have compared to members of the Ediacaran biota, generally believed to have disappeared at the start of the Cambrian, 539 million years ago. It was up to 20 cm long, and attached itself to the sea floor with a holdfast.

Thaumaptilon had a leaf-shaped body defined by a central axis extending to its tip, with many "ribs" radiating from it, in a similar manner to the ribs of a leaf. These may have had canals connecting them to the axis. One side of its surface was covered in spots, which might have been zooids.

Thaumaptilon is considered important due to its resemblance to some frondose Ediacarans; it was believed to be a relative of forms such as Charnia. A 2022 study suggested that it should be placed in the group Petalonamae along with similar Ediacaran forms.

Forms related to Charnia were once believed to be related to sea-pens (pennatulacean cnidarians), although this hypothesis has been questioned based on several lines of evidence.

The name Thaumaptilon is said to be derived from the Greek thauma, "wonderful", + ptilon, "soft feather". In ancient Greek, thauma (θαῦμα) however means "wonder".

== See also ==
- Ediacaran biota
