= Radulichnus =

Trace fossil classification
- Ichnofamily: Gnathichnidae
- Ichnogenus: Radulichnus; Voigt, 1977

Type ichnospecies
- Radulichnus inopinatus Voigt, 1977

Ichnospecies
- R. inopinatus Voigt, 1977; R. transversus Lopes & Pereira, 2018

Trace fossil

Radulichnus is an ichnogenus of trace fossil which resembles the marks produced by the action of a mollusc's radula on sediment. As an ichnogenus, its classification is based solely on appearance, and does not necessarily imply anything of the affinity of the organism which produced the trace. However, fossils of Kimberella have been found at or near the ends of Radulichnus traces, leading to the possibility that some traces were made by Kimberella.
