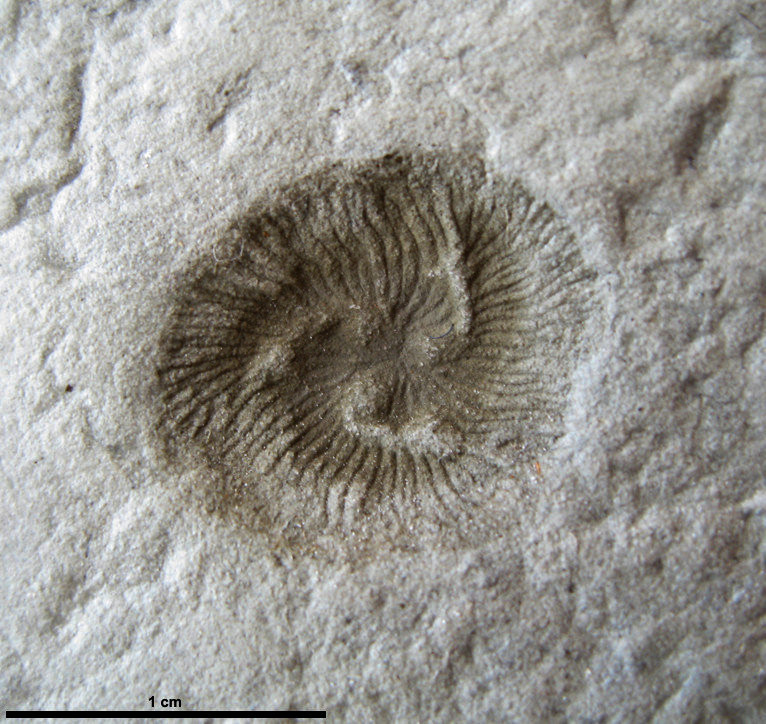
- Fossil of Tribrachidium heraldicum

Scientific classification
- Kingdom: Animalia
- Phylum: †Trilobozoa
- Family: †Tribrachididae
- Genus: †Tribrachidium; Glaessner, 1959

Species
- T. heraldicum (type); T. gehlingi

Synonyms
- Pomoria Fedonkin, 1980; P. corolliformis Fedonkin, 1980

= Tribrachidium =

Tribrachidium Temporal range: Ediacaran, 558–556 Ma

Extinct genus of invertebrates

Tribrachidium is a tri-radially symmetric fossil animal that lived in the late Ediacaran (Vendian) seas. In life, it was hemispherical in form. T. heraldicum is the best known member of the extinct group Trilobozoa.

== Etymology ==
The generic name Tribrachidium is derived from combination of the Ancient Greek: τρία (tria, "three") + Latin: brachium ("arm") + diminutive suffix -idium. The specific name T. heraldicum references the similarity of the pattern of this fossil with the well-known heraldic triskelion design, such as the coat of arms of the Isle of Man.

== Occurrence ==
Tribrachidium fossils were first discovered in the Ediacara Member of the Rawnslay Quartzite, Flinders Ranges in South Australia. This fossil is also known from the Mogilev Formation in the Dniester River Basin, Podolia, Ukraine and from the Verkhovka, Zimnegory and Yorga formations in the White Sea area of the Arkhangelsk Region, Russia. This fossil is also known from the Sonia Formation of Marwar Supergroup near Jodhpur, India.

== Description ==
Tribrachidium heraldicum is preserved as negative impressions on the base of sandstone beds. These fossils have a circular, three-lobe form, with straight or trefoil-like edges; they are usually covered by numerous radial branched furrows. The central part of the fossil has three hooked ridges ("arms"). The lobes are twisted into weak spirals.

The diameter of specimens ranges from 3 to 40 millimetres (0.3 to 4.0 cm). Its meter-scale distribution was found to be variable occurring both as solitary individuals and in groups.

=== Feeding method ===
In a 2015 study, Rahman et al. proposed that Tribrachidium heraldicum used a rare 'gravity settling' mode of suspension feeding based on computational fluid dynamics simulations, which showed that water flow was directed passively by the arms, funneling it towards three depressions ('apical pits') where water flow slowed down so that food particles would fall out of suspension.

== Reconstruction and affinity ==
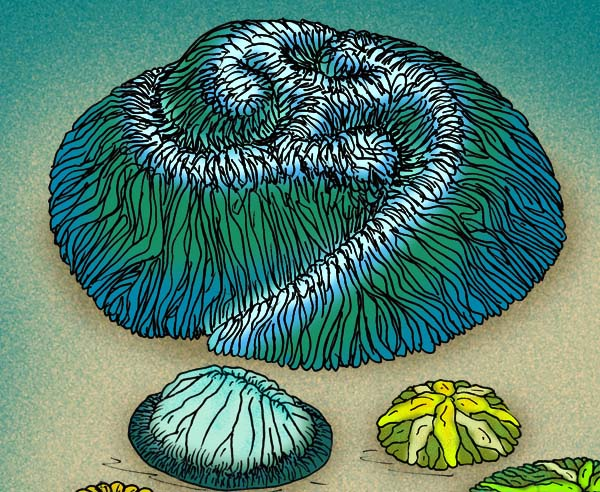
Reconstruction of Tribrachidium and other organisms: Tribrachidium heraldicum (top); Wigwamiella enigmatica, a taphomorph of aspidella (left); and Rugoconites enigmatica (right).

Tribrachidium was originally described by Martin Glaessner as a problematic organism, one that is excluded from all known major groups of animals by its tri-radial symmetry. However, Tribrachidium's superficial resemblance to edrioasteroid echinoderms was well known to researchers and discussed. Later, Glaessner rejected any putative affinities of this animal with any known phyla, leaving the status of its taxonomy uncertain. Originally, the various structures on the poorly preserved Australian specimens were interpreted as tentacles, peculiar arms and mouth, but later this interpretation was rejected. Its mode of locomotion in life also remains unknown.

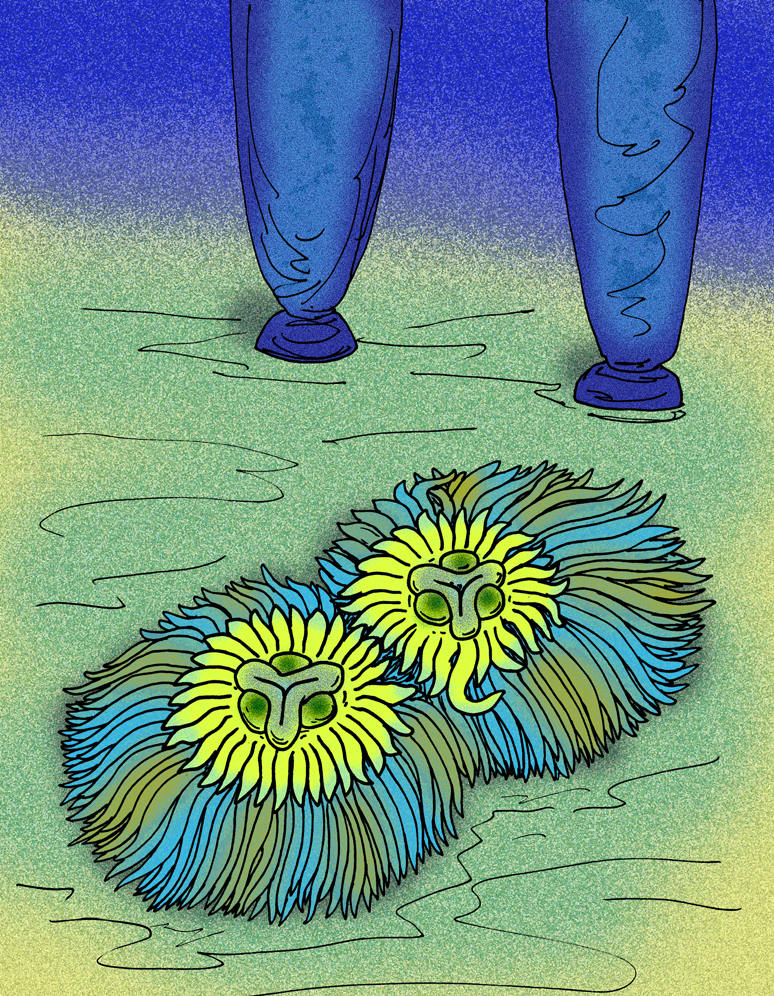
Pomoria corolliformis was once thought to be a Cnidarian polyp, although it has been disproven as instead being a poorly preserved Tribrachidium.

With the discovery of the closely related Albumares and Anfesta, along with the discoveries of much better-preserved Russian specimens, Mikhail Fedonkin proposed for these animals the new taxon, Trilobozoa – an extinct group of tri-radially symmetrical coelenterate-grade animals. Originally, Trilobozoa was erected as a separate class in the phylum Coelenterata, but after Coelenterata was divided into separate phyla Cnidaria and Ctenophora, the Trilobozoa was transferred to the rank of phylum.

M. Fedonkin has shown that the fossil of Tribrachidium is an imprint of the upper side of the animal's body, with some elements of its external and internal anatomy. The radial furrows on the fossil are radial grooves on the surface of the living animal, while the three hooked ridges in central part of the fossil are imprints of cavities within the body. Tribrachidium was a soft-bodied benthic organism that temporarily attached (but did not accrete) to the substrate of its habitat (microbial mats).

== See also ==
- Trilobozoa
- Gehlingia
- Albumares brunsae
- Anfesta stankovskii
- List of Ediacaran genera
- Triskelion
