= Solza margarita =

Solza Temporal range: late Ediacaran ~555 Ma
- Fossil of Solza margarita

Scientific classification
- Kingdom: Animalia
- Clade: Bilateria
- Genus: †Solza margarita Ivantsov, 2004

Type species
- †Solza margarita Ivantsov, 2004

Species
- †S. margarita Ivantsov, 2004

Extinct genus of kimberellomorph

Solza margarita is an extinct animal of uncertain phylogeny which lived about 555 mya in the Ediacaran period.

== Occurrence ==
Fossils of the Solza margarita is found in the Verkhovka and Zimnegory formations on the Solza River and Zimnii Bereg (Winter Coast), White Sea area of the Arkhangelsk Region, Russia.

== Etymology ==
The generic name Solza comes from the Solza river on the Onega Peninsula, White Sea, where the holotype and first specimens were found. The specific name, margarita, derives from the Greek μαργαριτηζ (margarita), meaning "pearl".

== Description ==
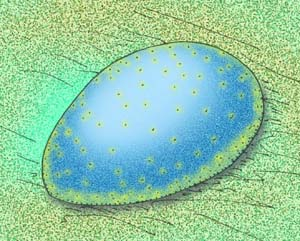
Reconstruction of Solza margarita

Solza was the shape of a low oblique cone with a base, which is egg-like in cross-section. Fossil impressions are covered by the meshwork of grooves, which is wide at the apex of the cone, narrowing and diverging towards the animal's edges.

In the first description it was suggested that the grooves were formed postmortem above cavities inside the body or they covered the body surface during the animal’s life.

- In the first view the grooves were interpreted as internal tubes in the living Solza, and opened to narrow pores along its surface. It was suggested that the canals hypothetically could be associated with feeding and represented system for filtering a suspension and microorganisms from water.
- According to the second view, the grooves are relief texture of the body surface during the animal’s life, resembling the non-mineralized patelliform shell, similar to the ones seen on Kimberella. Exactly this view was accepted in recent studies.

Described specimens of Solza range from 7.2–10.5mm in length, and 5.3–8mm wide. Most specimens show slight distortion, but preserve the basic egg-shape, implying that Solza had at least some firmness.

== Paleobiology ==
Fossil specimens easily demonstrate that Solza was a benthic, bilaterally symmetric organism: thus, it was likely a motile, mobile animal that adhered to the substrate. The furrows present on the body have been suggested to have aided in feeding, being used for suspension feeding, taking microorganisms from the surrounding water that settled on top.

== Classification ==
Solza commonly considered to be a bilateral fossil, likely mineralised shells, although researchers have been unable to ascertain whether they are molluscan in nature due to the lack of certain diagnostic features. Some researchers have placed it alongside Kimberella as a kimberellomorph, which was erected to contain some bilaterally symmetrical fossils, due to their notably similar morphologies. This similar morphology has led some researchers to also consider Solza to be a taphonomic variant of Kimberella.

== See also ==
List of Ediacaran genera
