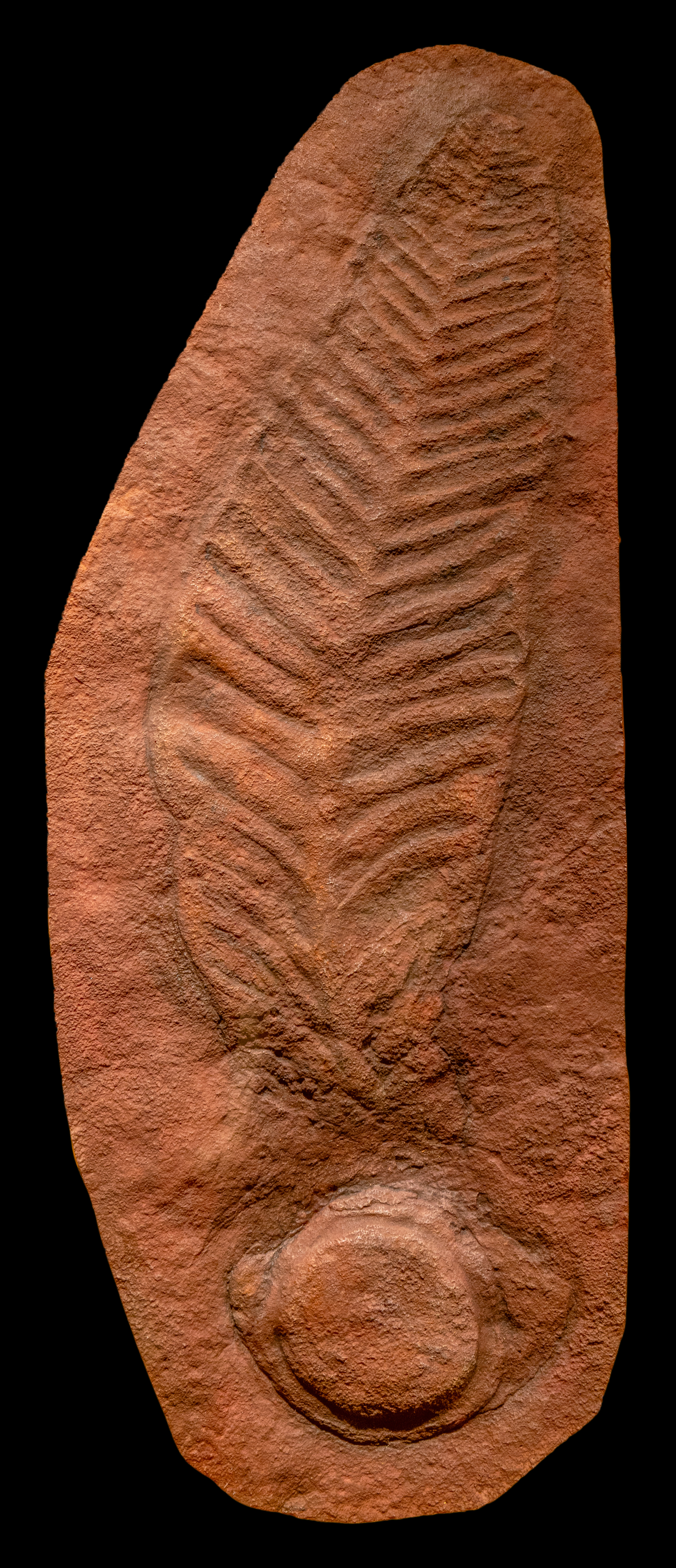
- Arborea arborea

Scientific classification
- Kingdom: Animalia
- Phylum: †Petalonamae; Pflug, 1972

Subtaxa
- †Rangeomorpha
- †Erniettomorpha
- †Arboreomorpha
incertae sedis
- †Ramellina
- †Stromatoveris
- †Thaumaptilon
- †Zolotytsia
- †Gigarimaneta
- †Petalostroma?
- †Parviscopa? (possible juvenile Primocandelabrum)

Synonyms
- Frondomorpha

= Petalonamae =

Petalonamae Temporal range: 635–508 Ma Ediacaran-Cambrian

Proposed extinct group of animals

The petalonamids (Petalonamae) or frondomorphs are an extinct group of archaic animals typical of the Ediacaran biota, dating from around 635 million years ago to 516 million years ago. They are benthic and immobile animals, shaped like leaves, fronds (frondomorphic), feathers, or spindles. While initially considered algae or octocorals akin to sea pens, it is now believed that there are no living descendants of the group, which shares a probable relation to the Ediacaran animals known as vendozoans.

Generally, these animals possess bilateral symmetry, like a feather with one axis and two sides. Some may be trilateral, with one axis and three sides, as seen in the erniettomorphs. Phylogenetically they are particularly difficult to classify. Lacking mouths, intestines, reproductive organs, or any other preserved evidence of internal structures, the morphology of these animals is very strange by current standards. The most widely accepted hypothesis is that they could directly absorb nutrients from the water around them by osmosis. It is commonly conjectured that these organisms were fluffy at least in appearance, as if "inflatable". The fronds were composed of branched, tubular structures, and the organism was anchored to the substrate by a bulbous structure akin to a holdfast.

== Phylogeny ==
The below phylogeny follows Hoyal Cuthill & Han (2018) who recover a clade which they name Petalonamae, including representatives of Rangeomorpha, Arboreomorpha and Erniettomorpha, Stromatoveris from the Lower Cambrian, as well as Dickinsonia, and identifying them as animals. This extended concept of Petalonamae was further extended by Hoyal Cuthill in 2022 to include Thaumaptilon from the Middle Cambrian. This concept of Petalonamae is equivalent to the Vendobionta.

- Animalia
  - Placozoa
  - - Porifera
    - - †Petalonamae
        - - - - †Rangea
              - †Stromatoveris
            - - †Pteridinium
              - †Ernietta
          - - †Arborea
            - †Pambikalbae
        - - - †Swartpuntia
            - †Dickinsonia
      - Eumetazoa

== See also ==
- †Vendobionta
  - †Trilobozoa, another group of Edicaran animals who have trilateral symmetry, similar to basal petalonams.
  - †Proarticulata, another group of enigmatic Ediacaran animals
- Eumetazoa
