= Mikhail Fedonkin =

Russian paleontologist (born 1946)

Mikhail А. Fedonkin
- М. Fedonkin in 2025
- Born: 19 June 1946 (age 80); Orekhovo-Zuyevo, USSR
- Citizenship: Russian
- Education: Moscow State University
- Known for: Studies done on various Ediacaran fossils; The Rise of Animals. Evolution and Diversification of the Kingdom Animalia
- Awards: Charles Doolittle Walcott Medal (1997); Peter The Great Medal (2000); Karpinsky Gold Medal (2021)
- Scientific career
- Fields: Paleontology; Geology; Biology
- Workplaces: Paleontological Institute, Russian Academy of Sciences
- Thesis: Biostratigraphy and paleontology of the Late Precambrian deposits of Kharaulakh Mountains, Northern Yakutia (Sakha) (1969)

Academician Mikhail Aleksandrovich Fedonkin (Russian: Михаи́л Алекса́ндрович Федо́нкин; born June 19, 1946) is a Russian paleontologist specializing in documentation of the earliest animals' body fossils, tracks, and trails. He has also described numerous Vendian-aged fossils including Hiemalora, Cephalonega, and Nimbia occlusa.

== Early life ==
Fedonkin was born in Orekhovo-Zuevo, Moscow Region, USSR (Later Russia), on June 19 1946. His father, Alexander Mikhailovich Fedonkin, was the city prosecutor and Senior Lieutenant.

=== Education ===
Fedonkin would attend at the oldest secondary school in Orekhovo-Zuevo, simply referred to as "School No.1", which was most well known for paleontology, although the original goal for Fedonkin was to become a geologist. He would complete his studies here, entering Moscow State University, where in 1969, Fedonkin presented a thesis titled "Biostratigraphy and paleontology of the Late Precambrian deposits of Kharaulakh Mountains, Northern Yakutia (Sakha)" to earn his MSc in Geology from Moscow State University. After obtaining his thesis, Fedonkin would be called to the Soviet Army under the Far Eastern Military District, although only for two years, as a commander. Once he returned from service, he went on to obtain a PhD in Stratigraphy\Paleontology (1978) and a Doctorate of Science in Paleobiology (1985) from the Geological Institute, USSR Academy of Sciences, Moscow for his dissertations on "Precambrian fauna and trace fossils from the Russian Platform north" and "Non-skeletal fauna of the Vendian and its place in the evolution of metazoans", respectively.

== Career ==
In 1971, Fedonkin became a junior scientific researcher at the Geological Institute, USSR Academy of Sciences, Moscow, after being invited by fellow geologist and paleontologist Boris Sokolov. In 1978, he became a senior scientific researcher at the Paleontological Institute, USSR Academy of Sciences, Moscow. In 1985 he was promoted to be the Lead Scientific Researcher.

Since 1992, Fedonkin has been the Head of the laboratory of Precambrian paleobiology at the Paleontological Institute of the Russian Academy of Sciences, Moscow. He was also a Honorary Research Fellow at Monash University between 2003 and 2004.

Whilst he predominately studies the East European Platform from Ukraine to Russia, he has also undertaken field work in other countries, such as Australia, Namibia, North America, Poland, Spain, Norway, and Scotland. He has published over 140 papers, as well as three authored books and five co-authored books.

=== Discoveries and Naming ===
Over the course of his career, Fedonkin has described and named a number of fossil organisms from Ediacaran aged rocks. Some of his early descriptions and naming includes Albumares in 1976, which was first described from the Verkhovka sub-formation of the wider Ustʹ Pinega Formation, with its generic name deriving from the Latin name for the White Sea, "Mare Album". Another fossil he would name would be the enigmatic Zolotytsia in 1981, which was also found in the Ust' Pinega Formation, and which is assigned to the family Petalonamae. Other fossils he has described and named include examples such as Andiva in 2002, Archangelia in 1979, Bomakellia and Khatyspytia in 1985, and Nimbia in 1980.

== Awards ==
- 1997, awarded the Charles Doolittle Walcott Medal by the National Academy of Sciences
- 2000, awarded the Peter The Great Medal for the merits in the revival of science and economics in Russia by the International Academy of Science on Nature and Society.
- 2021, awarded the Karpinsky Gold Medal for his outstanding work in the field of stratigraphy and paleontology of the Proterozoic Eon, as well as his work in early history of the biosphere and evolution.

== Selected publications ==
Below is a selection of various books and papers that Fedonkin has published since 1971.

=== Books ===
- 1981. White Sea Biota of the Vendian (Precambrian non-skeletal fauna of the Russian Platform north). Transactions of the Geological Institute, vol. 342. Moscow, Nauka, p. 1-100. (In Russian).
- 1983. Organic World of the Vendian. Moscow, VINITI, p. 1-128. (In Russian).
- 1987. Non-skeletal Fauna and Its Place in the Evolution of Metazoans. Transactions of the Paleontological Institute, vol. 226. Moscow, Nauka, p. 1-176. (In Russian).
- 2007. Fedonkin, M. A., Gehling, J. G., Grey, K., Narbonne, G. & Vickers-Rich, P., The Rise of Animals. Evolution and Diversification of the Kingdom Animalia. Johns Hopkins University Press, Baltimore, p. 1-326.

=== Scientific publications ===
- Krylov I.N., Shapovalova I.G., Kolosov P.N. and Fedonkin M.A. 1971. Riphean deposits of the Lena River lowstream. Sovetskaya Geologia, N 7, p. 85-95. (In Russian).
- Fedonkin M.A. 1976. Traces of the multicellular animals from Valdai Series. Izvestiya Akademii Nauk SSSR, ser. geol., N 4, p. 128-132. (In Russian).
- Keller B.M. and Fedonkin M.A. 1977. New organic fossil finds in the Precambrian Valdai Series along the Syuz'ma River. Internat. Geol. Rev., 19(8), p. 924-930. (Translation of the previous paper).
- Fedonkin M.A. 1980. Early stages of evolution of Metazoa on the basis of the paleoichnological data. Zhurnal Obchei Biologii, N 2, c. 226-233. (In Russian, abstract in English).
- Velikanov, V.A., Aseeva, E.A., Fedonkin, M.A 1983. The Vendian of Ukraine. Kyiv, Naukova Dumka, 1-161. (in Russian)
- Fedonkin, M.A. 1990. Precambrian metazoans. In: Briggs, D.E.G. & Crowther, P.R., eds., Palaeobiology. A Synthesis. Blackwell Scientific Publ. Ltd., p. 17-24.
- Crimes T.P. and Fedonkin M.A. 1994. Evolution and dispersal of deepsea traces. Palaios, vol. 9, N 1, p. 74-83.
- Fedonkin M.A. 1996. Geobiological trends and events in the Precambrian biosphere. In: Walliser O.H. (ed.) Global Events and Event Stratigraphy in the Phanerozoic: Results of the International Interdisciplinary Cooperation in the IGCP-Project 216 "Global Biological Events in Earth History"). Springer-Verlag, Berlin, Heidelberg, pp. 89–112.
- Lipps J.H., Collins A.G. and Fedonkin M.A. 1998. Evolution of biological complexity: Evidence from geology, paleontology and molecular biology. In: Hoover R.B. (ed.) Instruments, Methods, and Missions for Astrobiology. Proceedings of the International Society for Optical Engineering, vol. 3441, p. 138-148.
- Fedonkin, M.A. and Ivantsov A. Yu. 2001. Faunal succession in the Vendian (Terminal Proterozoic) deposits of the White Sea Region, north of the Russian Platform. North American Paleontological Convention, Berkeley, California. Abstracts. P. 50.
