= Mary Julia Wade =

Australian paleontologist and geologist

Mary Julia Wade (3 February 1928 – 14 September 2005) was an Australian palaeontologist, known for her role as the Deputy Director of the Queensland Museum. Some of her most renowned work was on the Precambrian Ediacaran Biota in South Australia.

Wade was born in Adelaide, South Australia and spent her early life on a property in the northeast of the state. She lived the typical country girl's life, it is said. Her family moved when she was seven to Thistle Island in Spencer Gulf where she first became interested in geology. She studied geology and biology at the University of Adelaide, and in 1954, completed a Bachelor of Science with Honors in Micropalaeontology. Wade worked as a Senior Demonstrator at the University, while completing her Doctorate of Philosophy in 1959. Studying remotely via correspondence, Wade was sent on scholarship to the Wilderness School in Adelaide as a boarder from the age of 13. After she finished school, she undertook a Bachelor of Science in Geology at the University of Adelaide before graduating in 1954. Wade worked as a demonstrator while she undertook her PhD on tertiary aged microfossils, under the supervision of Professor Martin Glaessner.

== Career ==
In 1959, after Wade received her Doctorate of Philosophy she took up research at the University of Adelaide looking into the earliest forms of animal life. In 1968, while at the University of Adelaide she worked with Martin Glaessner on the precambrian jellyfish fossils found in the Ediacara Hills of the Flinders Ranges.

In 1971, Wade moved to the Queensland Museum as curator of geology and worked her way up to becoming Deputy Director in 1980. She studied the Cambrian and Ordovician nautiloids from north Western Queensland. She also studied vertebrate fossils arranging for the preparation for display of a Cretaceous ichthyosaur, which had first come to the museum in 1935. She developed a network of contacts around Winton, and with Dr Tony Thulborn, they organized and supervised the excavation of 3,000 dinosaur footprints in the Tully Ranges from 1976 to 1977. This site, known as Lark Quarry, is now a major tourist destination, and is on the National Heritage list for the quality of the dinosaur footprints, evidence of a dinosaur stampede.

Wade, Thulborn and Alan Bartholomai joined an expedition from the Natural History Museum in 1978 to collect Mesozoic reptiles from around Winton.

In 1987, with the assistance of contacts in the Hughenden area, Wade recovered a second skull of the Queensland dinosaur, Muttaburrasaurus. She was able to excavate specimens of Kronoaurus, and secure the site and remains of Jurassic sauropod, Rhoetosaurus, which had been lost since the 1920s. In 1990, Wade excavated the most complete Pliosaurus fossil at Hughenden, presently known. She continued research into mollusc fossils of the Great Artesian Basin. Wade became an Honorary Research Associate of the Queensland Museum after retiring in 1993. She moved to western Queensland, helping to develop the Fossil Centers at Richmond and Hughenden.

Wade received the Queensland Museum Medal in 1994. Her research led to the development of Kronosaurus Korner in Richmond, the Flinders Discovery Centre in Hughenden, and Lark Quarry near Winton. The Dinosaur Trail tourist program is based on the work she and her contacts began.

In 1998, the Geological Society of Australia dedicated a special symposium in her honor. A prize is now given in her honor at the biennial Palaeo Down Under conference. Wade died in Charters Towers, Queensland, in 2005. She did not marry, and was survived by her brother.

== Published papers ==
- Wade, M. 1968. Preservation Of Soft-Bodied Animals In Precambrian Sandstones At Edicara, South Australia. Lethaia, 1: 238-267. doi:10.1111/j.1502-3931.1968.tb01740.
- Wade, M. 1979. Tracking dinosaurs: the Winton excavation. Australian Natural History, 19: 286–291.
- Thulborn, R. A. and Wade, M. 1979. Dinosaur stampede in the Cretaceous of Queensland. Lethaia, 12: 275–279.
- Wade, M. 1984. Platypterygius australias, an Australian Cretaceous ichthyosaur. Lethaia, 17: 99-113.
- Turner, S. & Wade, M. 1986. The records in the rocks. In: Mather, P. (ed.) A Time for a Museum. The History of the Queensland Museum 1862–1986. Queensland Museum, Brisbane, 128–149.
- Thulborn, R. A. and Wade, M. 1989. "A footprint as a history of movement". In Dinosaur Tracks and Traces, Edited by:Gillette, D. D. and Lockley, M. G. 51–56. : Cambridge University Press.
- Wade, M. 1989. "The stance of dinosaurs and the Cossack dancer syndrome". In Dinosaur Tracks and Traces, Edited by: Gillette, D. D. and Lockley, M. G. 73–82. : Cambridge University Press.
- Wade, M. 1994. Fossil Scyphozoa. In: Grasse´, P. (ed.) Traite´ de Zoologie. Masson et Cie, Paris.
- Thulborn, R. A. and Wade, M. 1984. Dinosaur trackways in the Winton Formation (mid-Cretaceous) of Queensland. Memoirs of the Queensland Museum, 21: 413–517.
- Thulborn, R. A. & Wade, M. 1984. Winton dinosaur footprints. Memoirs of the Queensland Museum, 21.
