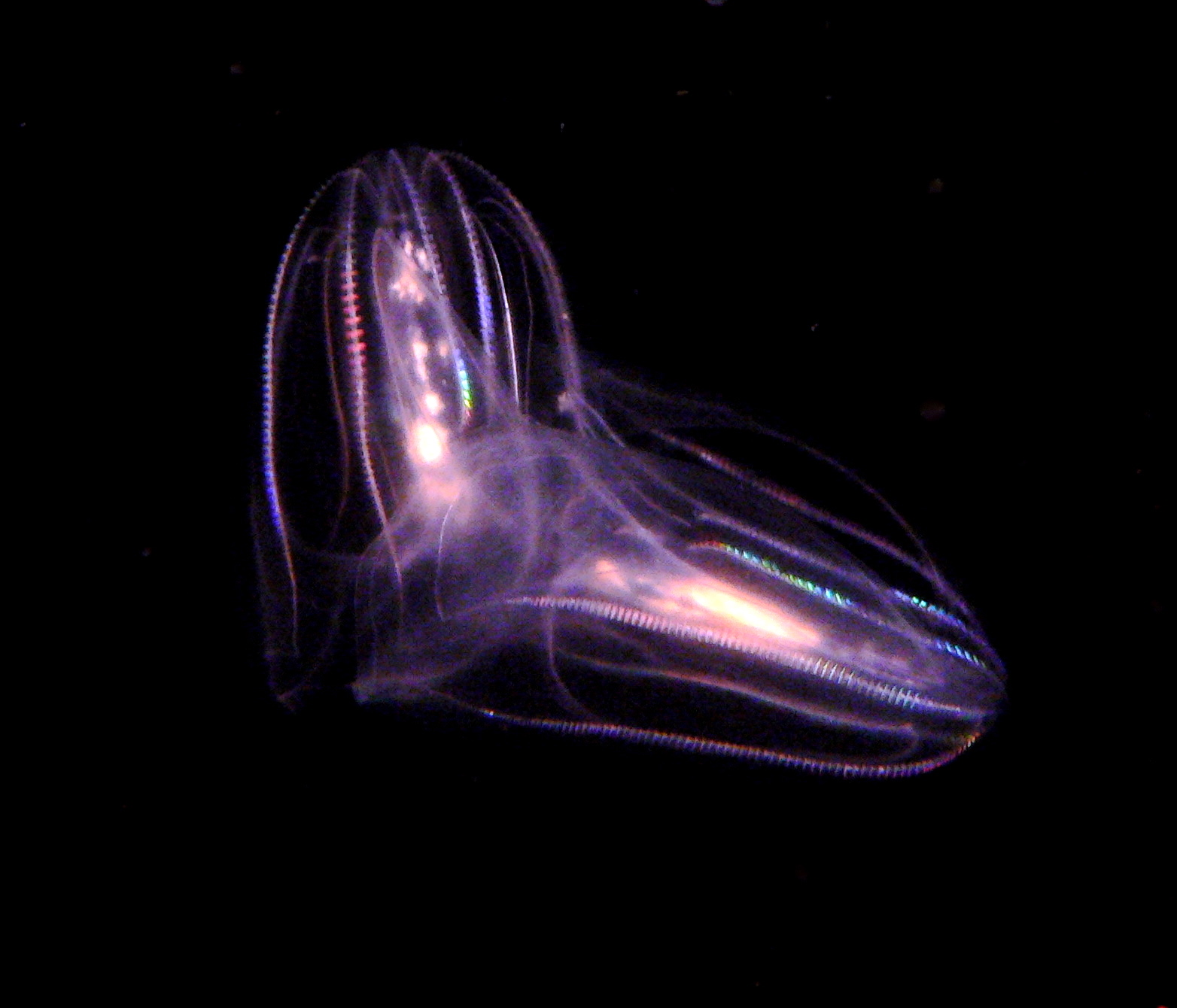
- Comb jellies (Beroe spp.)

Scientific classification
- Kingdom: Animalia
- Subkingdom: Eumetazoa
- Phylum: Coelenterata; Hatschek, 1888

Phyla
- Ctenophora; Cnidaria; Placozoa; "Vendian Coelenterata"; †Trilobozoa(?); †Cyclozoa (obsolete); †Inordozoa (obsolete)

= Coelenterata =

Coelenterates

Rejected phylum of animals

Coelenterata is a rejected phylum encompassing the animal phyla Cnidaria (corals, true jellies, sea anemones, sea pens, and their relatives) and Ctenophora (comb jellies). The name comes from Ancient Greek κοῖλος (koîlos) 'hollow' and ἔντερον (énteron) 'intestine', referring to the hollow body cavity common to these two phyla. They have very simple tissue organization, with only two layers of cells (ectoderm and endoderm), along with a middle undifferentiated layer called the mesoglea, and radial symmetry. Coelenterata lack a specialized circulatory system, relying instead on diffusion across the tissue layers.

== Characteristics ==
All coelenterates are aquatic, mostly marine, animals. The body form is radially symmetrical, diploblastic and does not have a coelom. The body has a single opening, the hypostome, surrounded by sensory tentacles equipped with either nematocysts or colloblasts to capture mostly planktonic prey. These tentacles are surrounded by a spacious cavity called the gastrovascular cavity, or coelenteron. Digestion is both intracellular and extracellular. Respiration and excretion are accomplished by simple diffusion. A nerve net is spread throughout the body. Many Cnidaria exhibit polymorphism, wherein different types of individuals are present in a colony for different functions. These individuals are called zooids. These animals generally reproduce asexually by budding, though sexual reproduction does occur in some groups.

== History of classification ==
The scientific validity of the term coelenterate is currently rejected, as the Cnidaria and Ctenophora have less in common than previously assumed. Coelentera may only be monophyletic if both Placozoa and Bilateria are included. In particular, the phylogenetic position of Ctenophora is controversial; it was first considered a sub-group of Coelenterata but Hyman regarded it as a separate phylum. Most researchers think that Coelenterata is not monophyletic, and therefore any group containing Cnidaria and Ctenophora but excluding other phyla would be paraphyletic.

Previously, some genomic studies have found support for monophyletic coelenterates. Despite this uncertainty, the term coelenterate is still used in informal settings to refer to the Cnidaria and Ctenophora.

Complicating the issue is the 1997 work of Lynn Margulis (revising an earlier model by Thomas Cavalier-Smith) that placed the Cnidaria and Ctenophora alone in the branch Radiata within Eumetazoa. (The latter refers to all the animals except the sponges and Placozoa.) Neither grouping is accepted universally; however, both are commonly encountered in taxonomic literature.
