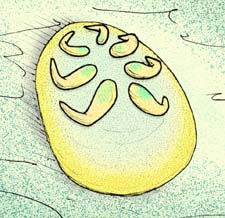

Scientific classification
- Kingdom: Animalia
- Phylum: †Proarticulata
- Class: †Cephalozoa
- Genus: †Tamga; Ivantsov, 2007
- Species: †T. hamulifera

Binomial name
- †Tamga hamulifera Ivantsov, 2007

= Tamga hamulifera =

Tamga hamulifera Temporal range: Ediacaran 555 Ma

Extinct species of Cambrian organism

Tamga is an extinct genus from the late Ediacaran of the White Sea, Russia. It is a monotypic genus, containing only Tamga hamulifera.

== Discovery and naming ==
The holotype fossil material of Tamga was found in the Zimnii Bereg locality of the Ust' Pinega Formation in Arkhangelsk Oblast, northwestern Russia in 2003, and formally described and named in 2007.

The generic name Tamga is derived directly from the Turkish word tamga, to mean "seal/cattle brand". The specific name hamulifera is derived from the Latin words hamulus, to mean "small hook"; and fero, to mean "bear", referring to the small hook-like isomers that Tamga bears on its back. The full meaning of the name can also be translated as a "seal that bears small hooks."

== Description ==
Tamga hamulifera is ovoid in shape, growing up to 5.4 mm (0.2 in) in overall length. It consists of two zones, the undivided/flattened peripheral zone that constitutes most of the body, and a convex central zone. The latter zone contains seven hook-like isomers, which increase in size from the narrower end to the wider end of the body.

The overall outline and flattened peripheral zone is also similar to the proarticulate Cephalonega, although they are differentiated by the fact that it has less isomers which are not only larger in size, but also have a more distinct hook-like shape, whilst Cephalonega's isomers do not. Similarities have also been drawn between Tamga and Praecambridium sigillum in again, the overall shape of the body and the presence of hook-like isomers.

It has also been suggested that Tamga could possibly represent fossil sclerites, as they show a similar shape to the sclerites of palaeoscolecids which are a disk with a ring or rows of tubercles in the center. But, the overall size of Tamga fossils are two magnitudes smaller than known palaeoscolecid sclerites and no mineralised sclerites of any sort have ever been found within known Ediacaran fossil sites.

== Taxonomy ==
Despite being described in 2007, the placement of Tamga with in the phylum Proarticulata remained unknown until a recent study by was done in 2019 by Ivanstov et al., which had Cephalonega as its main focus, but also compared both it and Tamga, alongside other small proarticulates to the juvenile forms of Yorgia, and finally assigned them within the class Cephalozoa, although outside of the family Yorgiidae as close relatives of Yorgia and other yorgiids.

== See also ==
- Lossinia
- List of Ediacaran genera
