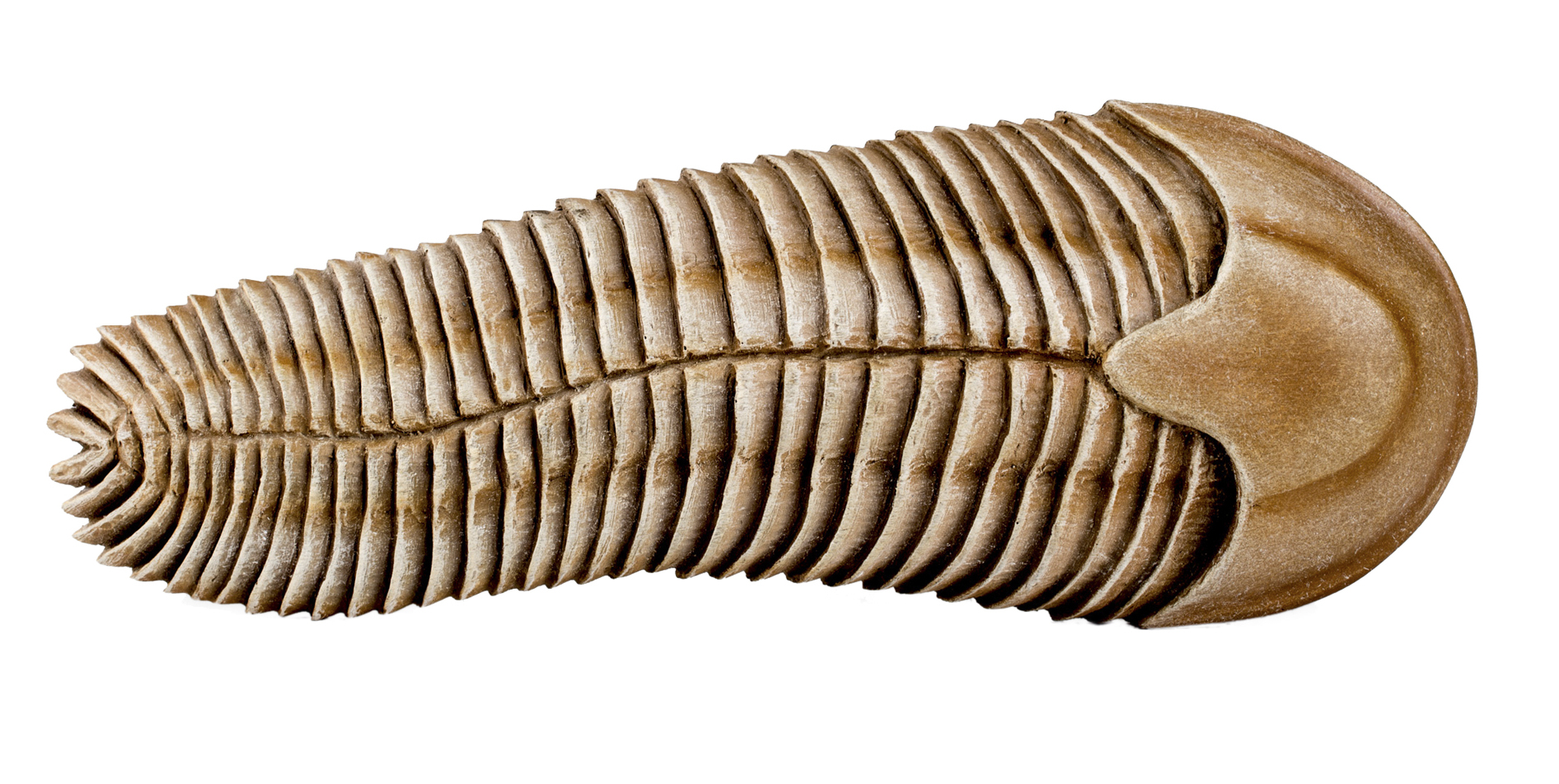
- A reconstruction of the type species, Spriggina floundersi

Scientific classification
- Kingdom: Animalia
- Phylum: †Proarticulata
- Class: †Cephalozoa
- Family: †Sprigginidae; Glaessner, 1958

Type species
- †Spriggina floundersi Glaessner, 1958

Genera
- See text

= Sprigginidae =

Sprigginidae Temporal range: Ediacaran 560 Ma

Extinct family of cephalozoans

Sprigginidae is an extinct family of the class Cephalozoa, characterized by having a greater number of isomers than its sister taxon, Yorgiidae. They lived approximately 635 million years ago, in the Ediacaran period.

== Description ==
Like most members of Proarticulata, their body plan consists of isomers arranged in glide symmetry, meaning they do not have true bilateral symmetry, although what sets them out from other proarticulates is their greater number of isomers, numbering up to around 40, sometimes more, overall. In most cases, they also have a distinct horseshoe-shaped 'head'.

When the first member of the family, Spriggina, was discovered, it was considered to be a polychaete annelid, a petalonamid frond, and even an arthropod, with probable relations to trilobites. Although most recent studies now agree that Spriggina, and the family it is a part of, are part of the phylum Proarticulata.

== Distribution ==
Most genera are restricted to sediments within the Flinders Ranges of South Australia, although some can be found within the Ust' Pinega Formation of Russia.

== Taxonomy ==
Sprigginidae includes the following genera:

- †Spriggina Glaessner, 1958
  - †Spriggina floundersi Glaessner, 1958
- †Marywadea Glaessner & Wade, 1966
  - †Marywadea ovata Glaessner & Wade, 1966
- †Cyanorus Ivantsov, 2004
  - †Cyanorus singularis Ivantsov, 2004
- †Praecambridium (?) Ivantsov, 1999
  - †Praecambridium sigillum (?) Ivantsov, 1999

Due to the rather small size of known Praecambridium specimens, and the large grain size of the matrix they are commonly found in, the placement of Praecambridium within the Sprigginidae family is tentative, as it is hard to discern certain details in such small specimens, but are placed within Sprigginidae based on a recent study that suggested they may be juvenile forms, if not of Spriggina itself, which has been found within the same beds of Praecambridium. Although other studies have noted that most reconstructions show similarities with juvenile forms of Yorgia, with it possibly being a larval stage of Yorgia itself.

Metaspriggina was previously tentatively assigned to Sprigginidae, even deriving its generic name from Spriggina, due to its overall morphology, although a more recent study re-describing the genus saw it re-assigned within the phylum Chordata.

== Gallery ==
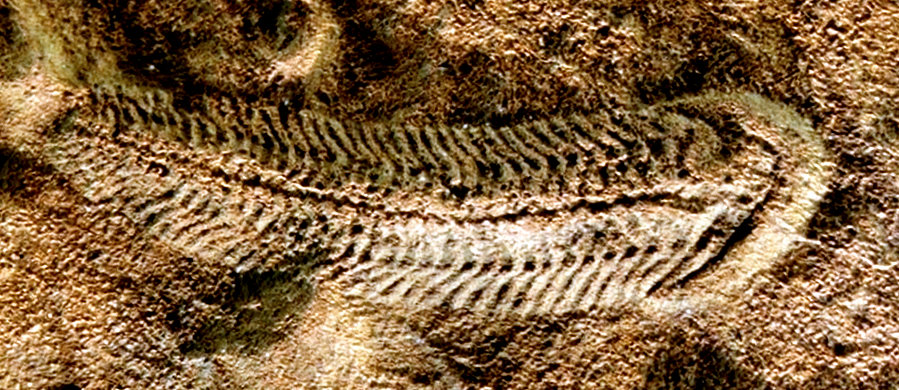
Spriggina floundersi

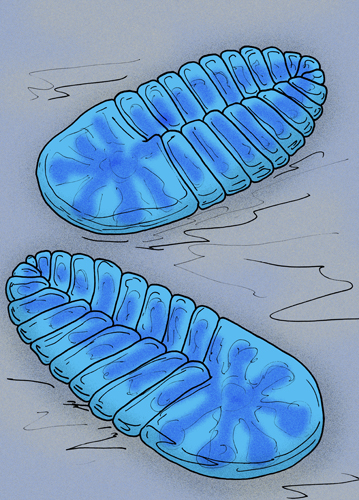
Cyanorus singularis

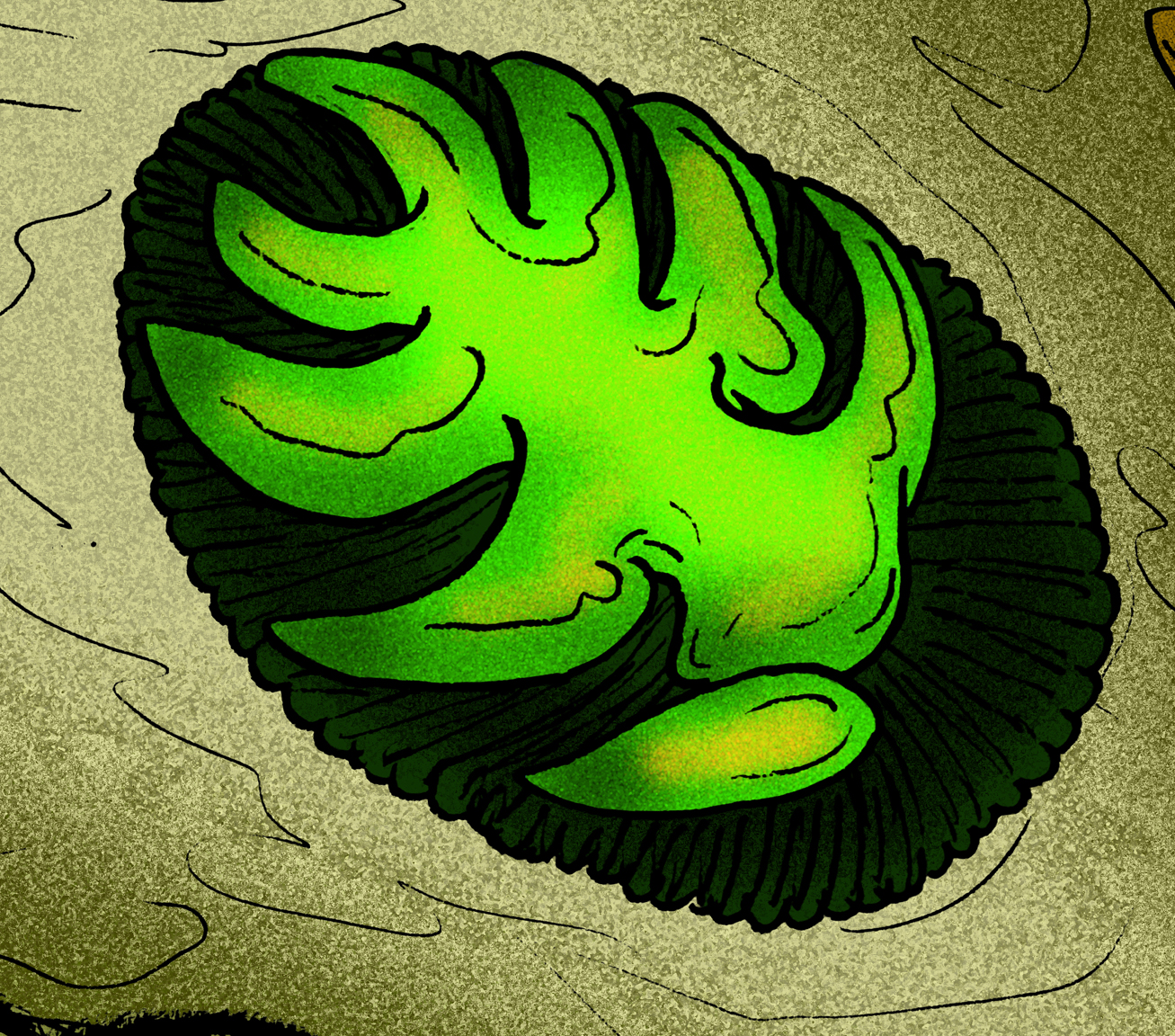
Praecambridium sigillum

Marywadea ovata

== See also ==
- Cephalozoa
- Yorgiidae
