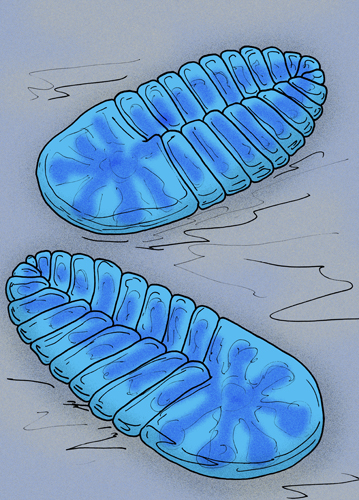
- Restoration of C. singularis

Scientific classification
- Kingdom: Animalia
- Phylum: †Proarticulata
- Class: †Cephalozoa
- Family: †Sprigginidae
- Genus: †Cyanorus; Ivanstov, 2004
- Species: †C. singularis

Binomial name
- †Cyanorus singularis Ivanstov, 2004

= Cyanorus =

Cyanorus Temporal range: Ediacaran, around 555 Ma

Genus of Precambrian organisms

Cyanorus singularis (Note: The genus name is derived from the Greek,κυανεος ορος, which means Blue Mountain, in honor of the name of the area of the same name, where the fossils were found.) is a small proarticulatan, closely related to Spriggina and Marywadea. The anterior part of the body was most likely not segmented. The axial structure of it combines features of the Vendia species and Dickinsonia species. It was found in the Upper Vendian of the White Sea area, Arkhangelsk Oblast. It is a White Sea Ediacaran fossil and it became extinct during the Late Precambrian.

Like other animals from the phylum Proarticulata, the symmetry observed is not exactly bilaterian but appears to be a glide reflection, where opposite segments are shifted by half an interval.
