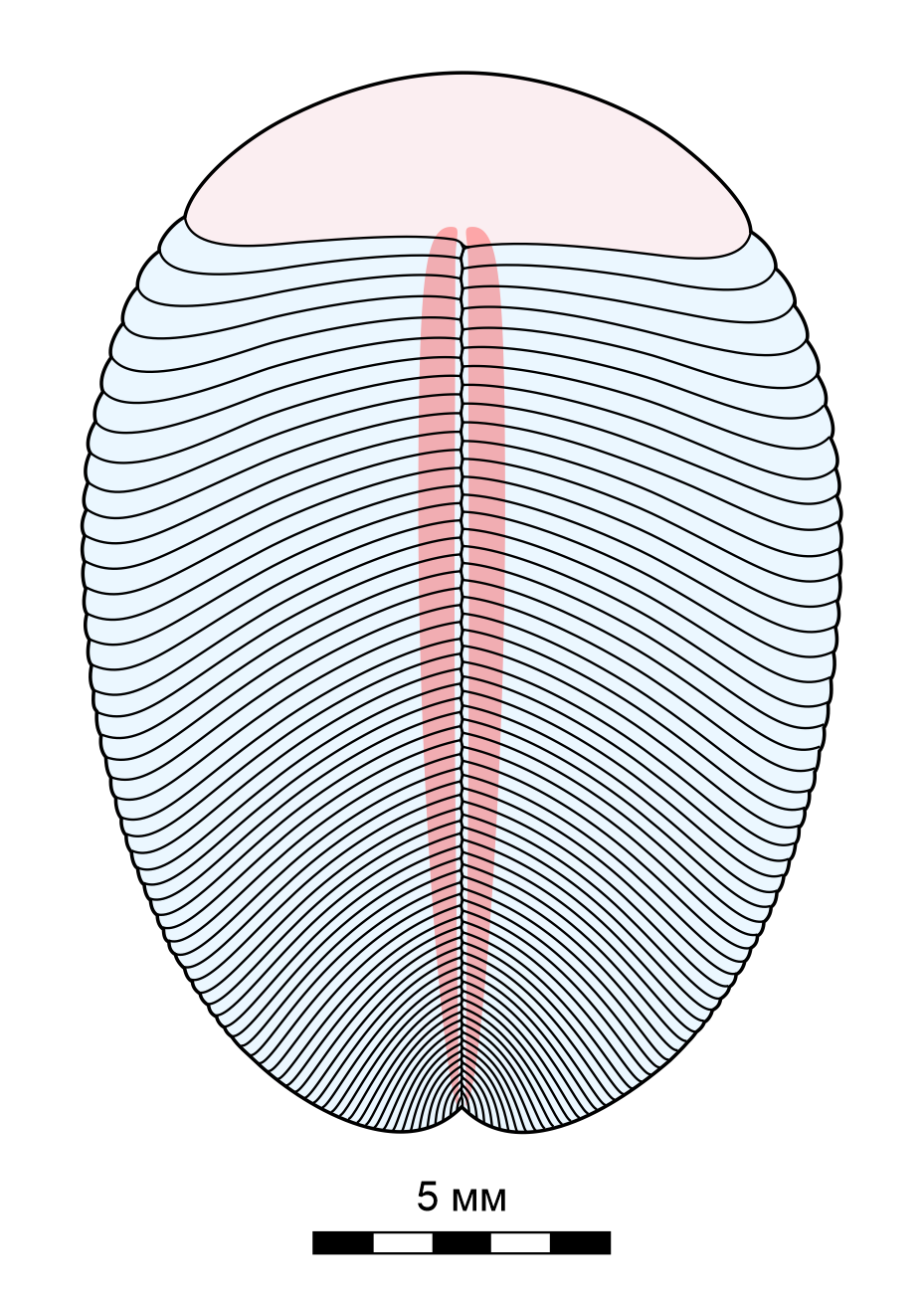
- Life restoration of Ivovicia rugulosa

Scientific classification
- Kingdom: Animalia
- Phylum: †Proarticulata
- Class: †Cephalozoa
- Family: †Yorgiidae
- Genus: †Ivovicia; Ivantsov, 2007
- Species: †I. rugulosa

Binomial name
- †Ivovicia rugulosa Ivantsov, 2007

= Ivovicia =

Ivovicia Temporal range: late Ediacaran ~553 Ma

Genus of proarticulate

Ivovicia is an extinct genus of yorgiid proarticulate from the late Ediacaran of Russia. It is a monotypic genus, containing only Ivovicia rugulosa.

== Discovery and naming ==
The holotype fossil material of Ivovicia was found in the Zimmii Bereg of the Zimniegory Subformation in the Ustʹ Pinega Formation, Arkhangelsk Region, Russia in 2002 and 2005, and was formally described and named in 2007.

The generic name Ivovicia derives from the place name of Ivovik Creek, which is near to the type locality that the fossils were found in. The specific name rugulosa derives from the Latin word rugulosus, to mean "finely wrinkled", in reference to the overall appearance of the organism.

== Description ==
Ivovicia rugulosa is an oval-shaped organism, getting up to 18.8 mm (0.7 in) in length and 12.6 m (41.3 ft) at its widest. It is composed of a wide, but short, undivided "head" region, and a long body of notably thin isomers. The isomers are, as with all proarticulates, offset from one another in what is known as glided symmetry, forming a zig-zag shaped midline. On either side of this midline, it has been noted there are two prominent bands from the back of the "head" to the posterior of the body.

== Affinities ==
Ivovicia is noted to combine certain features from other proarticulates, like Dickinsonia, Andiva and Marywadea, with it being mentioned that Ivovicia could represent junior specimens of Dickinsonia or Andiva due to said shared features. Although, other certain features in these two other genera make this not possible, as no Dickinsonia species bear a notable "head" region, whilst the smallest Andiva specimen is already quite different from the largest specimen of Ivovicia. Meanwhile the similarities with Marywadea, a sprigginid only known from Australia, suggests that yorgiids like Ivovicia may represent a transitional family between the simpler dickinsoniids, and the more complex sprigginids. As with most other Ediacaran organisms, Ivovicia was assigned to the proposed clade of Vendobionta.

Ivovicia would later be brought under the Cephalozoa class, due to the family its in, the Yorgiidae, being brought under said class alongside the Sprigginidae family, due to the aforementioned similarities between the two.
