= Hanadirella =

Scientific classification
- Kingdom: Animalia
- Phylum: Arthropoda (?)
- Genus: †Hanadirella
- Species: †H. bramkampi

Binomial name
- †Hanadirella bramkampi El-Khayal, 1986

Problematic arthropod-like animal

Hanadirella bramkampi is a species of problematic organism from the Lower Ordovician (Llanvirn) of the Tabuk formation located in central Saudi Arabia, and has been recognised as probably having taxonomic relationships with the phylum Arthropoda.

Hanadirella bramkampi is the type species and only species in the genus Hanadirella, making the genus monotypic.

== Description ==
H. bramkampi represents a segmented organism which suggests an arthropod affinity due to its multiple segments which are seen in arthropods (e.g. Trilobites). Specimens of H. bramkampi typically show a flat, oval hat-shaped organism baring some similarities in how it looks to animals such as Yorgia from the Ediacaran, with its diameter being less than 1 mm.

Because of the animals enigmatic nature and its affinity not being understood yet, its palaeoecology—along with its affinity which was discussed later—are being argued with.

== Importance ==
Hanadirella bramkampi and other fossils from its common fossil location, represents a little amount of value when it comes to biostratigraphical value, although the Tanes Member provides an outstanding record of graptolites from the middle Arenigian, located in the Rioseco Nappe, as well as a unique amount of lingulid coquinas for H. bramkampi.
