= Podolimirus =

Podolimirus Temporal range: Late Ediacaran 557 Ma

Scientific classification
- Kingdom: Animalia
- Phylum: †Proarticulata
- Class: †Cephalozoa
- Genus: †Podolimirus; Fedonkin, 1983
- Species: †P. mirus

Binomial name
- †Podolimirus mirus Fedonkin, 1983

Synonyms
- Genus: Valdainia Fedonkin, 1983; Species: Valdainia plumosa Fedonkin, 1983

Genus of proarticulate

Podolimirus is an extinct genus of proarticulates from the Ediacaran of Ukraine, and possible preserves internal organs. It is the monotypic genus, containing only Podolimirus mirus.

== Discovery ==
The first fossil specimens of Podolimirus were found and described from the Lomoziv Member, in the Mogilev Formation, Dniester River in Ukraine, near the deposits in the Vendian Sequence by Mikhail A. Fedokin in 1983. The site of its discovery was below a volcanic ash bed, which has been dated to 556.78 ± 0.18 million years ago using the U-Pb method.

== Description ==
Podolimirus is a rounded, quilted organism, growing up to 20 cm (7.9 in) in length. Like other proarticulates, it has a Glide reflection, meaning it is not truly symmetrical. And as is common within the White Sea area, some fossils contain what may be internal organs. The largest of these is the "dorsal quilt", possibly filled with liquid in life, with thirteen, possibly fourteen, arched units either side of a median line, making 26 altogether. These units would gradually decrease their arching and size towards the posterior end of the body. The fossils do not properly preserve a medial wall down the middle, although several do have the arched units separated down the middle, hinting at a possible medial wall down the middle.

There is also a bifurcating structure at the front of the organism, similar to what is seen in Yorgia. These have been suggested to possible represent intestinal diverticula.

== Taphonomy ==
Specimens of Podolimirus may have been preserved through injections of sediment into the body after death. This would have come in the form of liquidised sediments replacing the liquids inside of the probable internal organs, although not preserving the entire body of the organism.

== Affinities ==
When first described, Podolimirus was interpreted to be a genus of petalonamid, being noted to bear similarities to Pteridinium, although still differed greatly enough to be named as a separate genus. The petalonamid interpretation remained until 2015, when more complete material was found from a newly uncovered outcrop of the Mogilev Formation, showing that Podolimirus was not a petalonamid as previously thought, but actually a proarticulate. It was later assigned to the Cephalozoa, a class of proarticulates that have fairly rounded bodies, with notable "head" regions at the front of this body.

== See also ==
- List of Ediacaran genera
