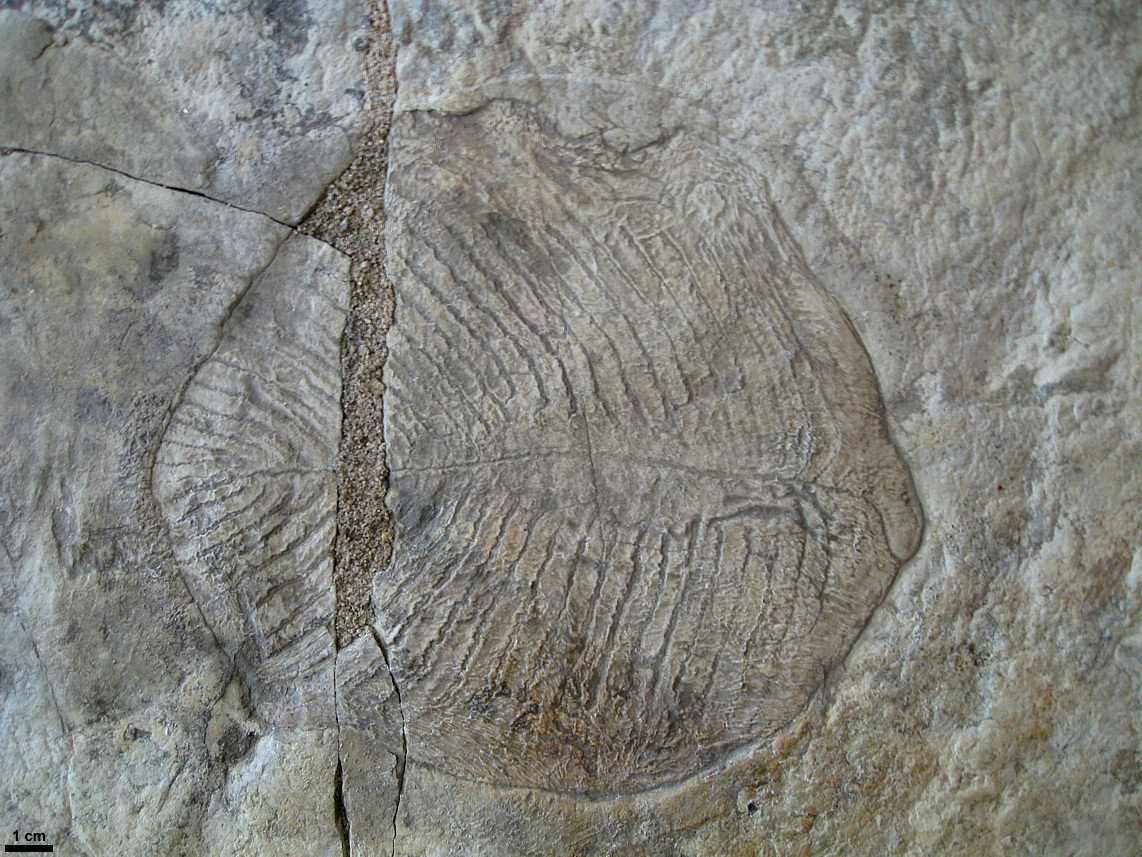
- Fossil of Yorgia waggoneri, a cephalozoan found on the shores of the White Sea.

Scientific classification
- Kingdom: Animalia
- Phylum: †Proarticulata
- Class: †Cephalozoa; Ivantsov, 2004

Subtaxa
- †Cephalonega; †Andiva; †Lossinia; †Podolimirus; †Tamga; †Yorgiidae Ivantsov, 2001; †Sprigginidae Glaessner, 1958

= Cephalozoa =

Cephalozoa Temporal range: Ediacaran 571–551 Ma

Extinct class of marine animals

Cephalozoa are an extinct class of primitive segmented marine organisms within the phylum Proarticulata from the Ediacaran period. They possessed bilateral symmetry and were characterized by a thin, rounded body.

== Description ==
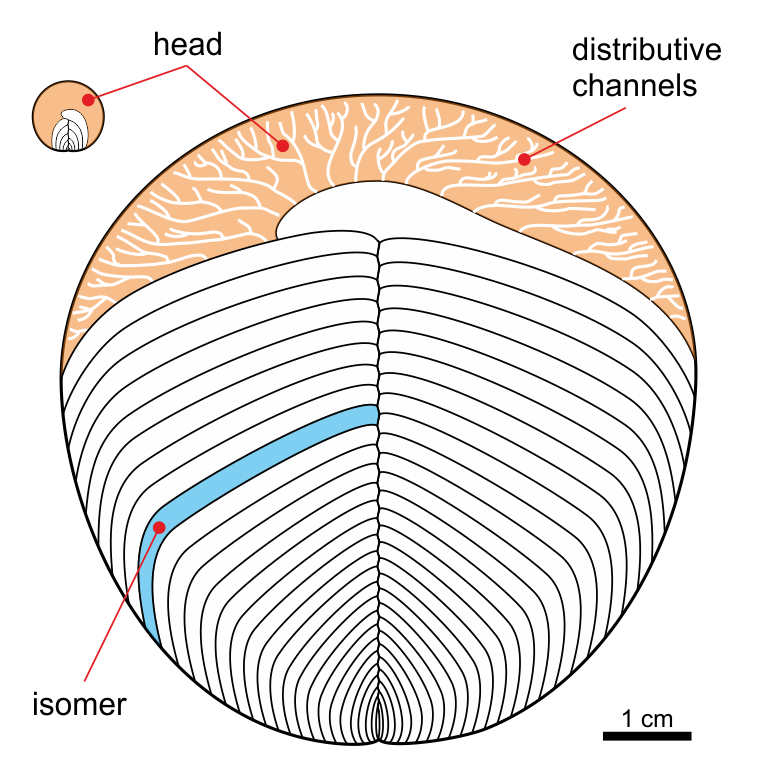
Yorgia waggoneri organization diagram.

Unlike the other classes of proarticulates, the segmentation of the body is not complete and shows a "head" with fine distribution channels. Some species of the Yorgiidae family also show some asymmetry.

They were discovered in Russia near the White Sea in the Arkhangelsk region, where they lived during the Ediacaran, approximately 635 to 540 Ma (millions of years ago).

== Taxonomy ==
Cephalozoa includes the families Yorgiidae and Sprigginidae, as well as genera not assigned to any family:

Family †Yorgiidae Ivantsov, 2001

- †Archaeaspinus Ivantsov, 2007
  - †Archaeaspinus fedonkini Ivantsov, 2001
- †Yorgia Ivantsov, 1999
  - †Yorgia waggoneri Ivantsov, 1999
- †Ivovicia Ivantsov, 2007
  - †Ivovicia rugulosa Ivantsov, 2007

Family †Sprigginidae Glaessner, 1958

- †Spriggina Glaessner, 1958
  - †Spriggina floundersi Glaessner, 1958
- †Marywadea Glaessner, 1976
  - †Marywadea ovata Glaessner and Wade, 1966
- †Praecambridium Glaessner and Wade, 1966
  - †Praecambridium sigillum Glaessner and Wade, 1966
- †Cyanorus Ivantsov, 2004
  - †Cyanorus singularis Ivantsov, 2004

Praecambridium was previously classified as Yorgiidae; now considered a potential juvenile form of Spriggina

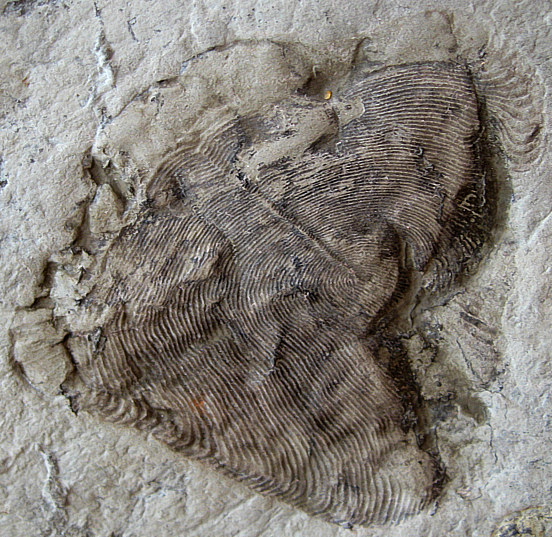
Fossil of Andiva ivantsovi.

Unattributed to a family

- † Cephalonega Fedonkin in Ivantsov et al., 2019
  - † Cephalonega stepanovi Fedonkin, 1976
- † Podolimirus Fedonkin, 1983
  - † Podolimirus mirus Fedonkin, 1983
- † Andiva Fedonkin, 2002
  - † Andiva ivantsovi Fedonkin, 2002
- † Lossinia Ivantsov, 2007
  - † Lossinia lissetskii Ivantsov, 2007
- †Tamga Ivantsov, 2007
  - †Tamga hamulifera Ivantsov, 2007

Recent studies indicate that the family Yorgiidae could be included or closely related to the class Vendiamorpha.

== See also ==
- Ediacaran fauna
