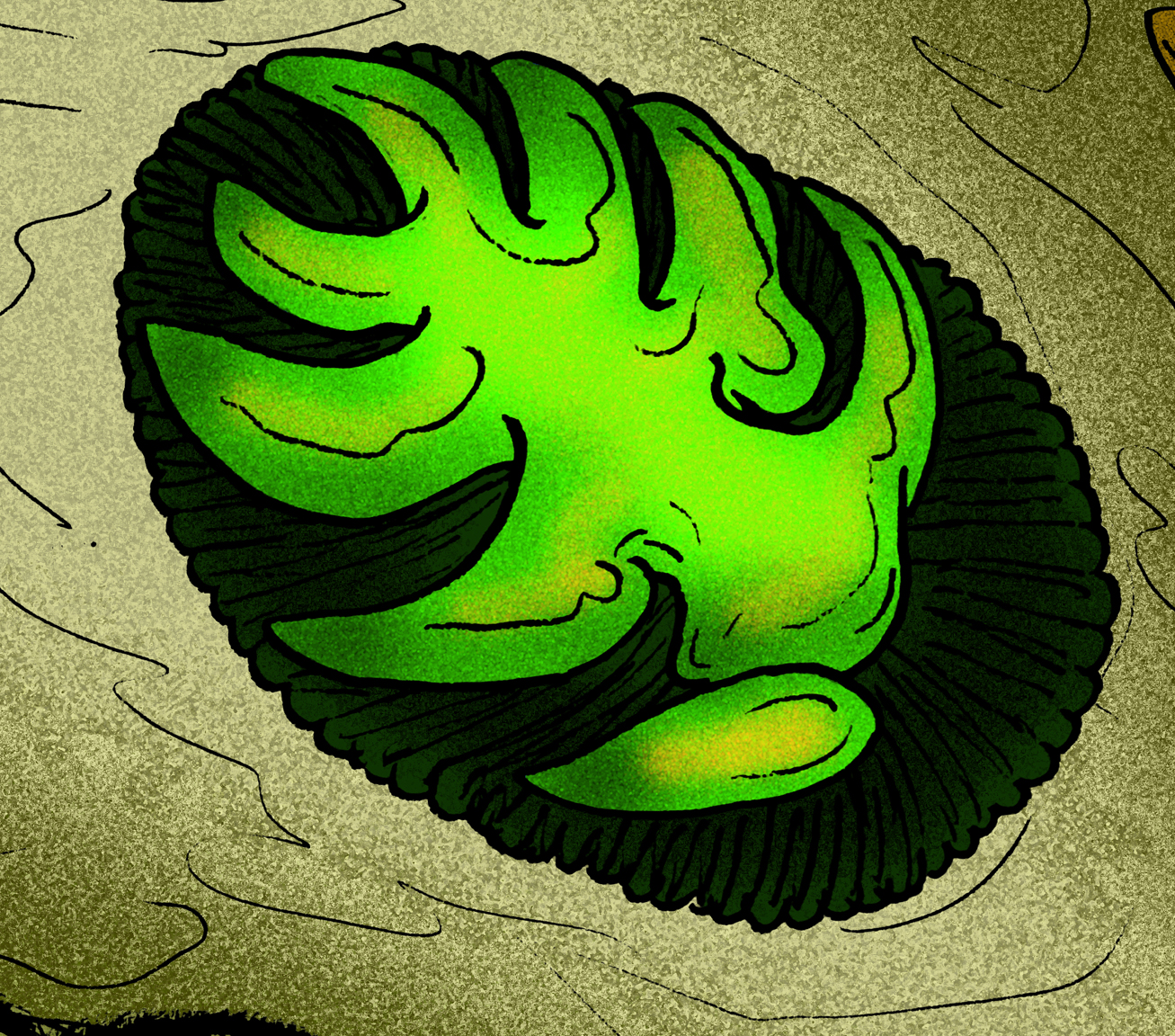
- Artist's restoration of P. sigillum

Scientific classification
- Kingdom: Animalia
- Phylum: †Proarticulata
- Class: †Cephalozoa
- Family: †Yorgiidae (?)
- Genus: †Praecambridium; Glaessner & Wade, 1966
- Species: †P. sigillum

Binomial name
- †Praecambridium sigillum Glaessner and Wade, 1966

= Praecambridium =

Praecambridium Temporal range: Late Ediacaran, around 555 Ma

Extinct genus of marine animals

Praecambridium sigillum is an extinct organism that superficially resembles a segmented trilobite-like arthropod, and it was originally described as such, though the majority of experts now place it within the Proarticulata as a close relative of the much larger Yorgia. It is from the Late Ediacaran deposit of Ediacara Hills, Australia, about 555 million years ago. On average, P. sigillum had at least 5 pairs of segments, with each unit becoming progressively larger as they approach the cephalon-like head.

== Etymology ==
The generic name is a compound word, with the Latin prefix prae "before" and a reference to the Cambrian mollusc genus Cambridium, in reference to how the appearance of the various segments are reminiscent of the muscle-scars on the inner surface of the shells of Cambridium. The specific name is from Latin sigillum "a sigil".

== Classification and interpretations ==
Runnegar and M.A. Fedonkin (1992) suggested that P. sigillum should become a synonym of Spriggina, while others have stated that the animal shares more in common with Dickinsonia brachina. Gehling (2006) noted that there is 'no evidence that Praecambridium is a juvenile Dickinsonia, Spriggina or Marywadea and he pointed out the fact that all of the juvenile forms of these genera are only found in South Australia and do not share common characteristics with any Praecambridium fossil specimens.

== Description ==
Praecambridium sigillum represents an organism which possessed 3-6 arcuate segment-like structures that have also been interpreted as appendages. The appearance of structures which bare a resemblance to segments has led to a possible affinity -or being a close relative of trilobites or chelicerates or possibly a close relative of both. Because the presumed intestinal caeca are present in some Dickinsonia specimens, it has also been suggested that Pracambridium also had them internally. P. sigillum possessed a head shield that paired a branching pair of ribs with the ribs of the organism tapering towards their end and as they get further from the head shield, they point towards the end of the animal; with Glaessner and Wade concluding that the segments (or lobes) increased in size during growth of Praecambridium. The ribs on either side of the body coalesce along a close midline. However, contradicting the comparison of Praecambridium between the Trilobites and Chelicerates, it may be that Praecambridium wasn't a truly segmented animal albeit was still compared in morphology to arthropods and annelids.

The sculpture of the head shield of Praecambridium siggilum has been proposed as being the expression of an underlying digestive/distribution system which is also seen in agnostid trilobites.

== See also ==
- List of Ediacaran genera
