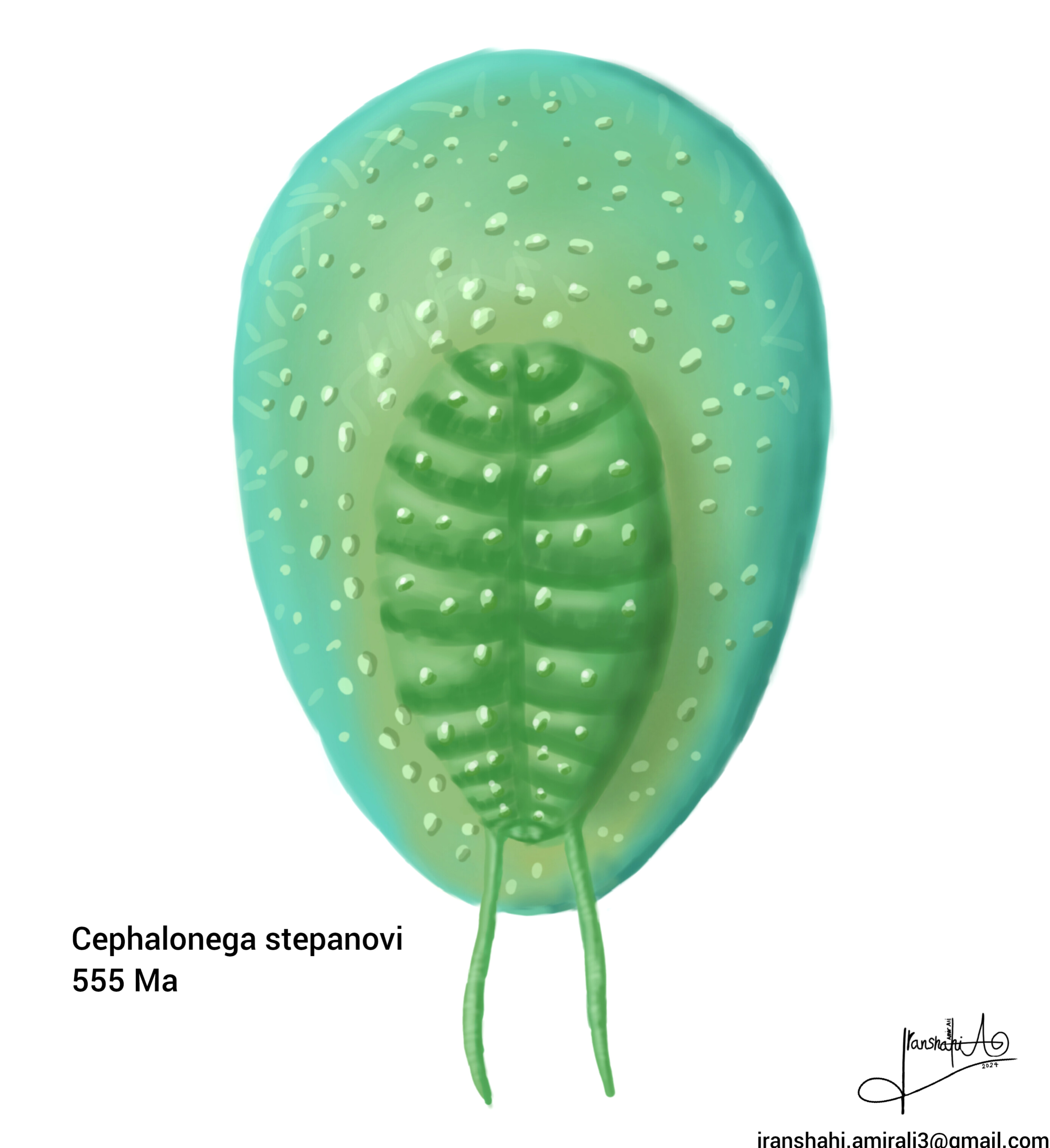
- Reconstruction of Cephalonega stepanovi

Scientific classification
- Kingdom: Animalia
- Phylum: †Proarticulata
- Class: †Cephalozoa
- Genus: †Cephalonega; Fedonkin in Ivantsov et al., 2019
- Species: †C. stepanovi

Binomial name
- †Cephalonega stepanovi (Fedonkin, 1976)

Synonyms
- Onega stepanovi Fedonkin, 1976

= Cephalonega =

Cephalonega stepanovi Temporal range: Ediacaran, around 555 Ma

Extinct genus of invertebrates

Cephalonega stepanovi is a fossil organism from Ediacaran deposits of the Arkhangelsk Region, Russia. It was described by Mikhail A. Fedonkin in 1976.

== Name ==
Its original genus name Onega comes from the Onega Peninsula of the White Sea, where the first fossils were found. The species name was given to honour V.A. Stepanov, who discovered the Ediacaran fossil site on the Letniy Bereg ("Summer Coast") in 1972, on the Onega Peninsula, the first Proterozoic site found in the Arkhangelsk Oblast. The original generic name is previously occupied by the hemipteran genus Onega Distant (1908). Ivantsov et al. (2019) coined a replacement generic name Cephalonega.

== Morphology ==
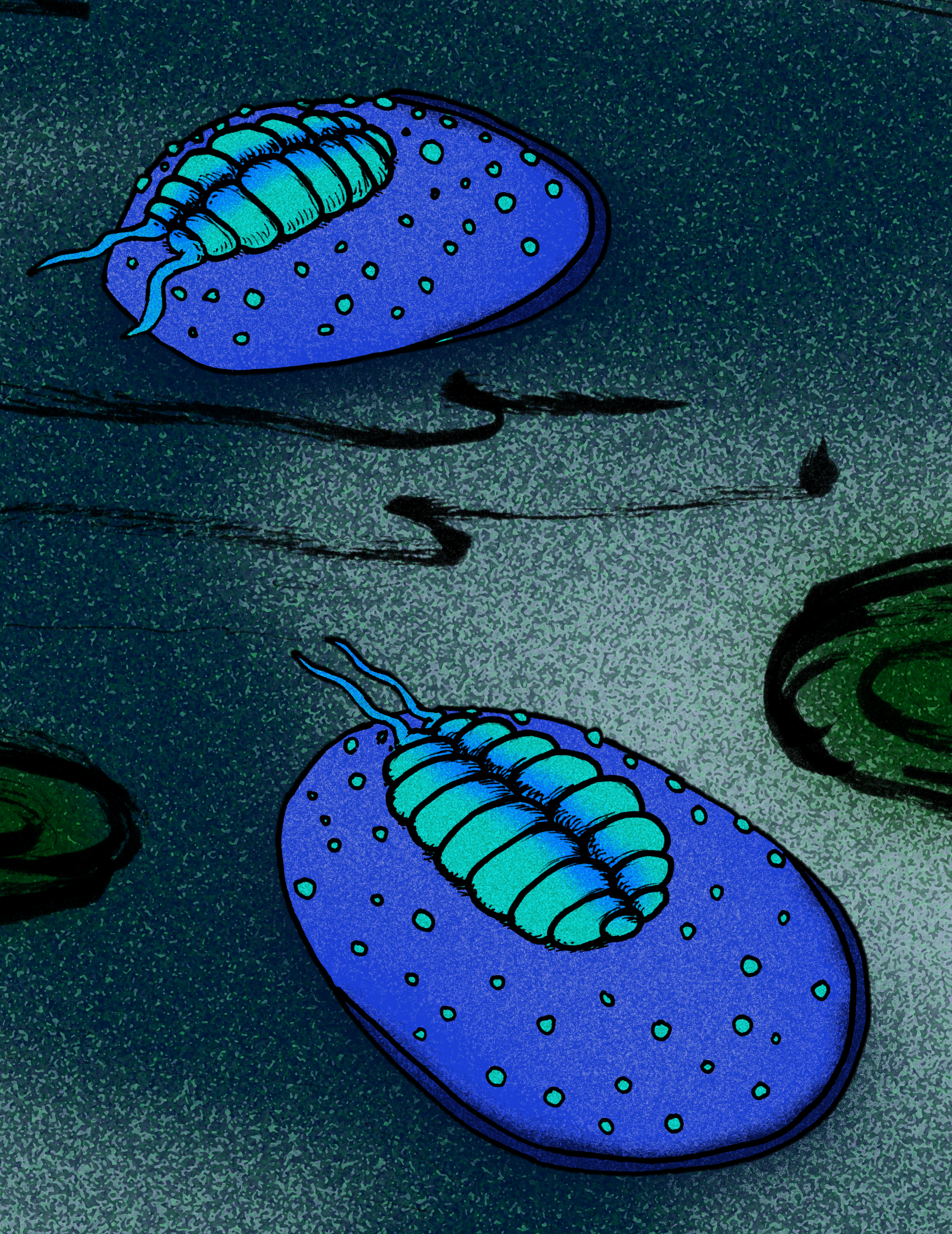
Restoration of the living organism

The small fossils, which range up to 7 millimetres (0.28 in) long, have oval outlines and low bodies with an articulated central zone built of isomers encircled by an undivided zone. The surface of the undivided region of Cephalonega is covered with small tubercles.

Cephalonega was originally described by Mikhail Fedonkin as a problematic organism, being grouped together with Vendia, Praecambridium and Vendomia as possible stem-group arthropods due to a vague similarity with primitive Cambrian trilobites and arthropods.

In 1985 Mikhail Fedonkin erected Phylum Proarticulata, in which he placed: Cephalonega, Dickinsonia, Palaeoplatoda, Vendia, Vendomia, Praecambridium and Pseudovendia sp., although he did not exclude the possibility that Cephalonega may still be related to various lower Cambrian arthropods, such as Skania.

Andrey Yu. Ivantsov has proposed that Cephalonega should be placed in the phylum Proarticulata, as the segments in recently discovered, exceptionally well-preserved fossils display the glide, or "staggered", symmetry characteristic of the majority of proarticulatans.

According to a 2019 study, all Cephalonega researchers agree that it is a proarticulatan in the class Cephalozoa that also includes e.g. Yorgia, Andiva and Spriggina.

== Fossil record ==
External image
- https://ru.wikipedia.org/wiki/Файл:Отпечаток_Onega_stepanovi.jpg Cephalonega stepanovi imprint

Imprints of Cephalonega stepanovi have been found in the Verkhovka and Zimnie Gory Formations of the Ediacaran (Vendian) rocks of the Arkhangelsk Region, Russia.

All the fossil specimens are negative imprints on the bases of fine-grained sandstone beds with the "elephant skin" and tubercle texture diagnostic of microbial mats. The same bedding planes contain various other Ediacaran species: Cyclomedusa, Ediacaria, Palaeopascichnids, Eoporpita, Yorgia, Andiva, Archaeaspinus, Vendia, Dickinsonia, Anfesta, Albumares, Tribrachidium, Kimberella, Parvancorina, Charniodiscus and others.

== See also ==
- List of Ediacaran genera
