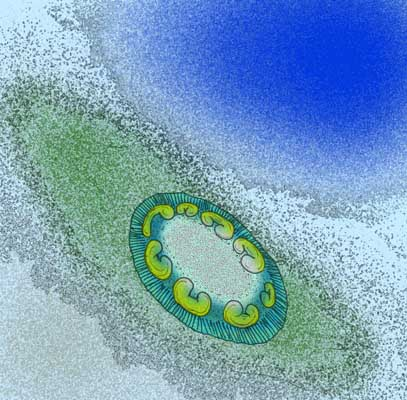
- Artists interpretation of Armillifera parva

Scientific classification
- Kingdom: Animalia
- Phylum: †Proarticulata
- Genus: †Armillifera; Fedonkin, 1980
- Species: †A. parva

Binomial name
- †Armillifera parva Fedonkin, 1980

= Armillifera =

Armillifera Temporal range: late Ediacaran ~553 Ma

Extinct genus of marine animal

Armillifera parva is a species of Ediacaran proarticulate first described by Mikhail Fedonkin in 1980. It is the only species in the genus Armillifera. Its fossils were discovered in the White Sea area, Arkhangelsk Region, Russia. These fossils of A. parva were restricted to almost the same stratigraphic range as Kimberella, although fossils of both organisms have been rarely found.

== Morphology ==
Armillifera is bilaterally symmetric, oval shaped animal from the Ediacaran period. It is convex, located in the centre of its body, possess a flattened and surrounding band with its surface being covered by multiple turbercules that form rounded edges around the band. The surface of its central region possesses deep, hook-shaped depressions that are arranged accordingly to glide reflection of bilateral symmetry.

== Classification ==
The 'shell' of Armillifera possess a lack of a grow line, its bilateral symmetry suggests that A. parva might've been one of the more actively moving organisms. The fact that the deep hook-shaped depressions in its central region are arranged accordingly to glide reflection symmetry suggest a possible affinity with the Proarticulata.

== See also ==
- List of Ediacaran genera
