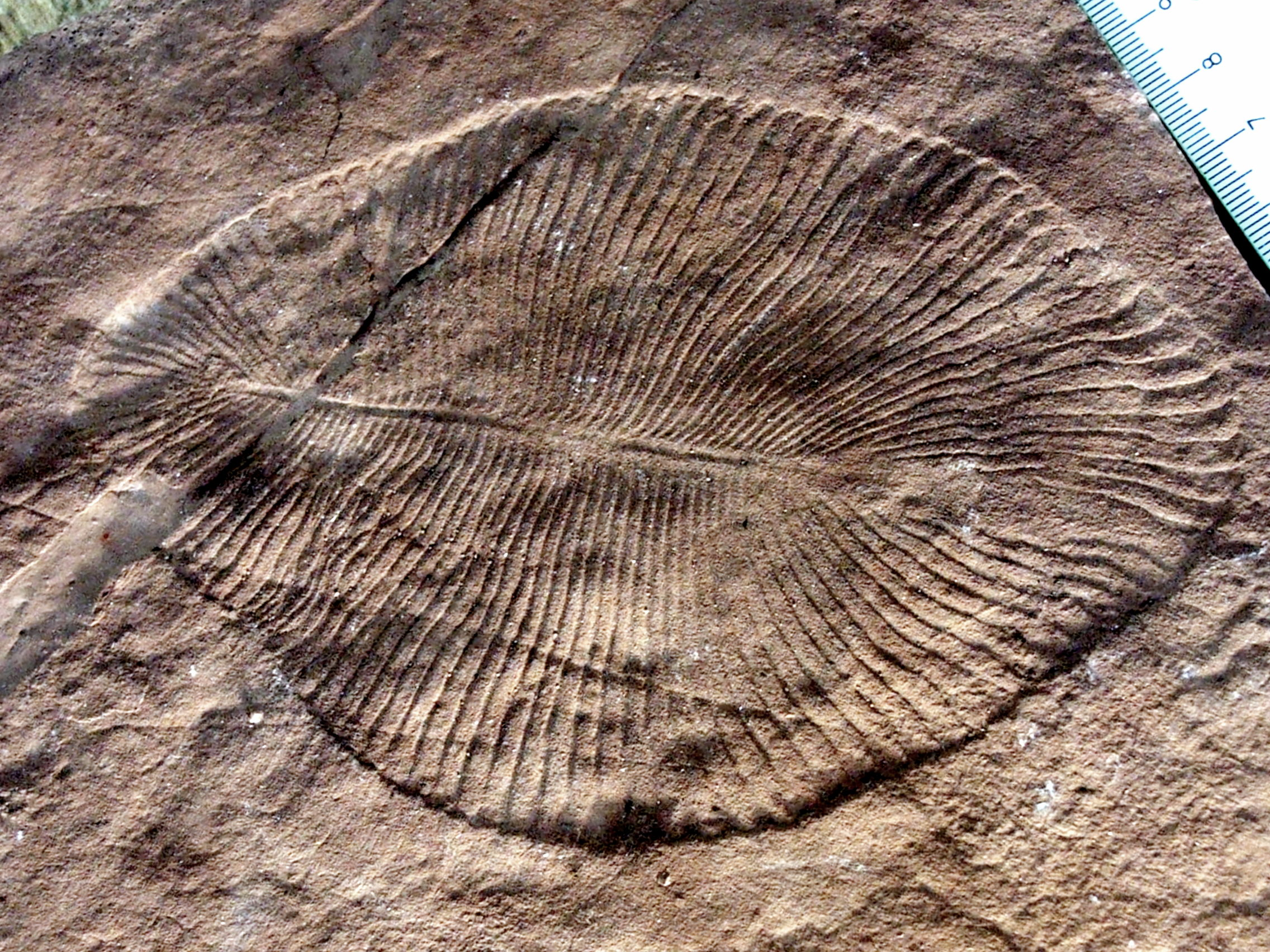
- Fossil of Dickinsonia costata
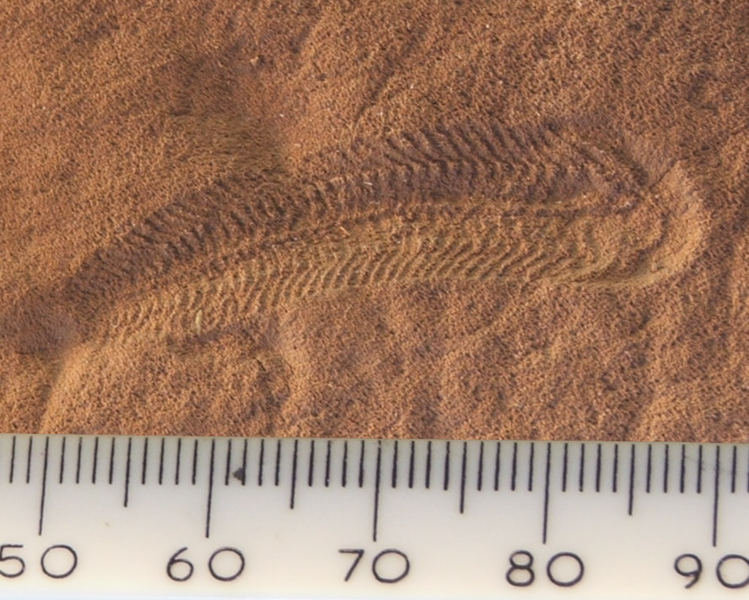
- Fossil of Spriggina

Scientific classification
- Kingdom: Animalia
- Clade: Bilateria (?)
- Phylum: †Proarticulata; Fedonkin, 1985

Classes and families
- †Vendiamorpha Fedonkin, 1985; †Vendiidae Ivantsov; †Dipleurozoa Harrington & Moore, 1955; †Dickinsoniidae Harrington & Moore, 1955; †Cephalozoa Ivantsov. 2004; †Sprigginidae Glaessner, 1958; †Yorgiidae Ivantsov, 2001; For more taxa, see text

= Proarticulata =

Proarticulata Temporal range: Ediacaran, 567–550 Ma

Extinct phylum of animals

Proarticulata is a phylum of extinct, near-bilaterally symmetrical animals known from fossils found mainly in the Ediacaran (Vendian) marine deposits, with some few possible related specimen found through Cambrian until late Devonian, and dates to approximately 567 to 550 million years ago. The name comes from the Greek προ (pro-) = "before" and Articulata, i.e. prior to animals with true segmentation such as annelids and arthropods. This phylum was established by Mikhail A. Fedonkin in 1985 for such animals as Dickinsonia, Vendia, Cephalonega, Praecambridium and currently many other Proarticulata are described (see list).

Due to their simplistic morphology, their affinities and mode of life are subject to debate. They are almost universally considered to be metazoans, and due to possessing a clear central axis have been suggested to be stem-bilaterians. In the traditional interpretation, the proarticulatan body is divided into transverse articulation (division) into isomers as distinct from the transverse articulation segments in annelids and arthropods, as their individual isomers occupy only half the width of their bodies, and are organized in an alternating pattern along the longitudinal axis of their bodies. In other words, one side is not the direct mirror image of its opposite (chirality). Opposite isomers of left and right side are located with displacement of half of their width. This phenomenon is described as the symmetry of gliding reflection. Some recent research suggests that some proarticulatans like Dickinsonia have genuine segments, and the isomerism is superficial and due to taphonomic distortion. However, other researchers dispute this. Displacement of left-right axis is known in bilaterians, notably lancelets.

== Morphology ==
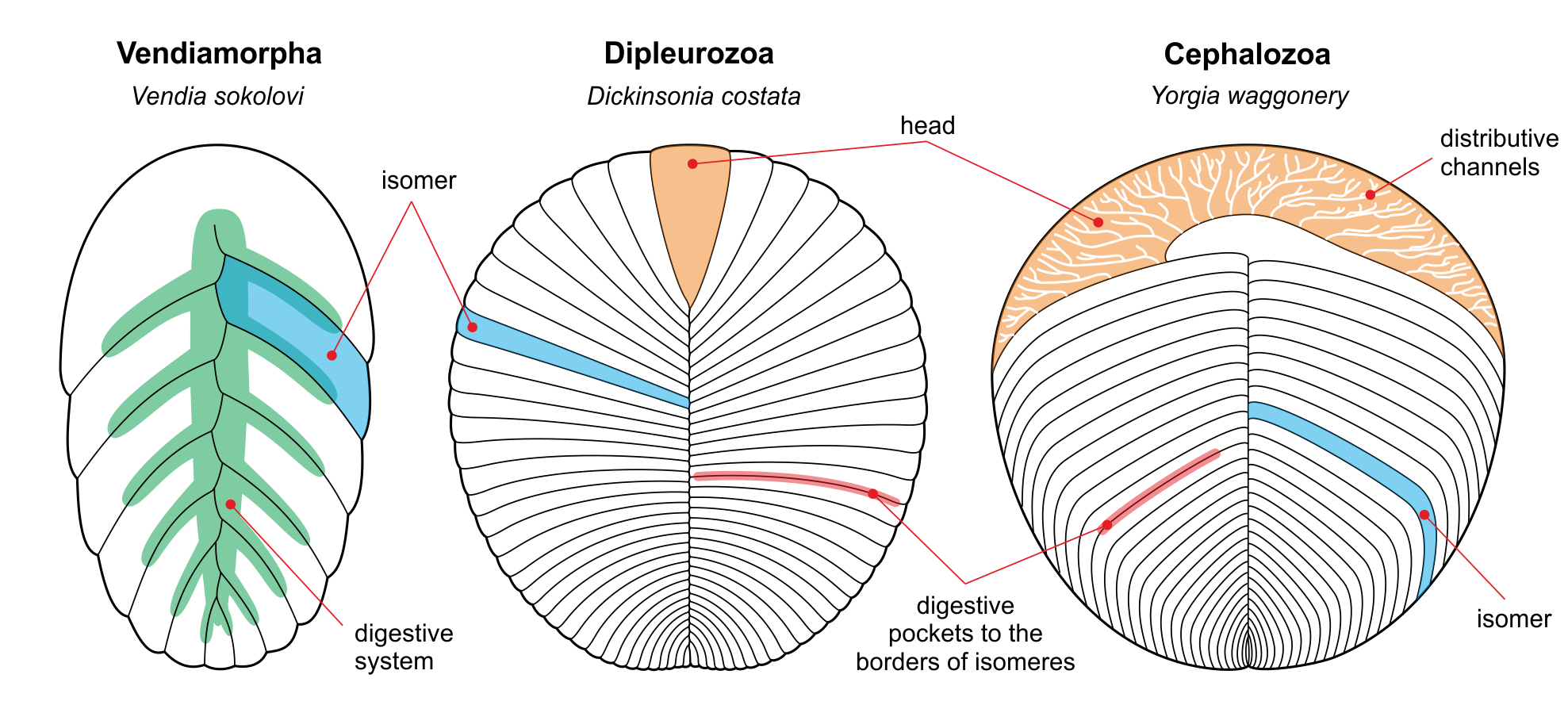
Examples of the classes Proarticulata, including reconstructions of Vendia sokolovi, Dickinsonia costata and Yorgia waggoneri.

=== Vendiamorpha ===
The body is completely segmented, with all isomers curved towards the posterior, and the first isomer is normally much larger than the rest. The first two isomers at the anterior dorsal end are partly fused. (e.g., Vendia, Paravendia and Karakhtia).

=== Cephalozoa ===
These proarticulatans are incompletely segmented, as the anterior zone is free of isomers, often making a "hairband" like appearance (example cephalozoans include Yorgia, Praecambridium, Andiva, Archaeaspinus, Ivovicia, Podolimirus, Tamga, Spriggina, Marywadea and Cyanorus). Some cephalozoans from the family Yorgiidae demonstrate pronounced asymmetry of the left and right parts of the body. For instance, Yorgia's initial right isomer is the only one which spreads far towards the left side of the body. Archaeaspinus has an unpaired anterior lobe confined by the furrow to the left side only.

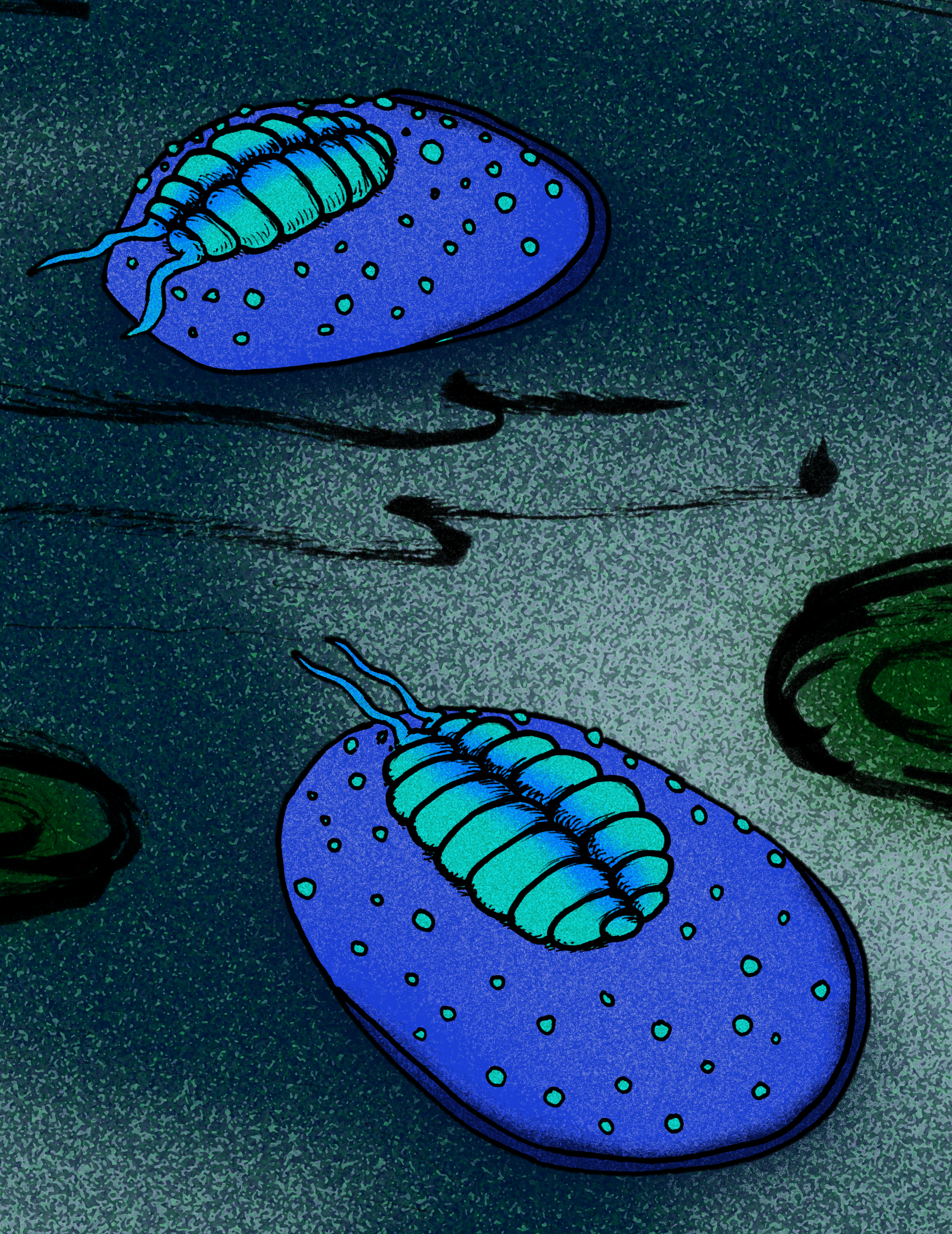
Artist's reconstruction of Cephalonega stepanovi.

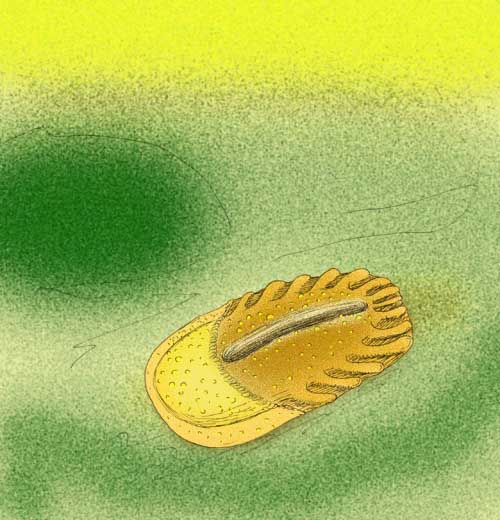
Artist's reconstruction of Lossinia feeding on surface algae.

In Cephalonega stepanovi and Tamga hamulifera the zone containing the isomers is encircled by a peripheral, undivided zone. The Cephalonega's isomers are connected to each other, forming a body resembling a rubber raft; the Tamga's isomers are separated from each other, and do not touch.

In Lossinia, the center undivided region has no visible isomers, instead having the lobe-like isomers emanate from the periphery of the undivided region as "transverse articulations."

=== Dipleurozoa ===
The dipleurozoan body is subradial, divided by isomers entirely (e.g., Dickinsonia and Phyllozoon). Dickinsonia juveniles show undivided anterior areas but these regions were reduced in the course of ontogeny, and in the adult stages Dickinsonia-like proarticulates changed so radically that they became almost indistinguishable from isomers.

== List of proarticulates ==
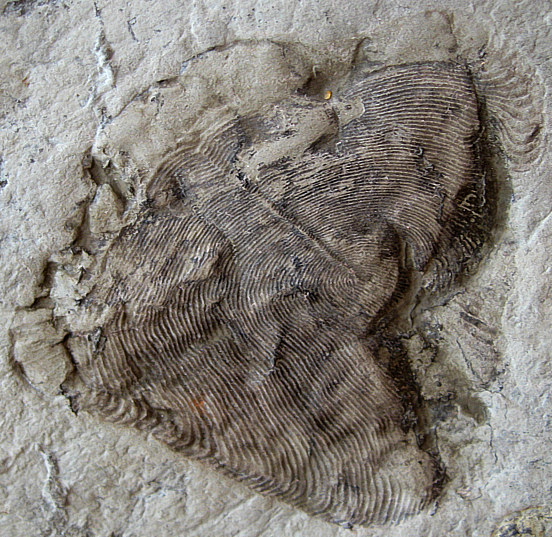
Andiva ivantsovi

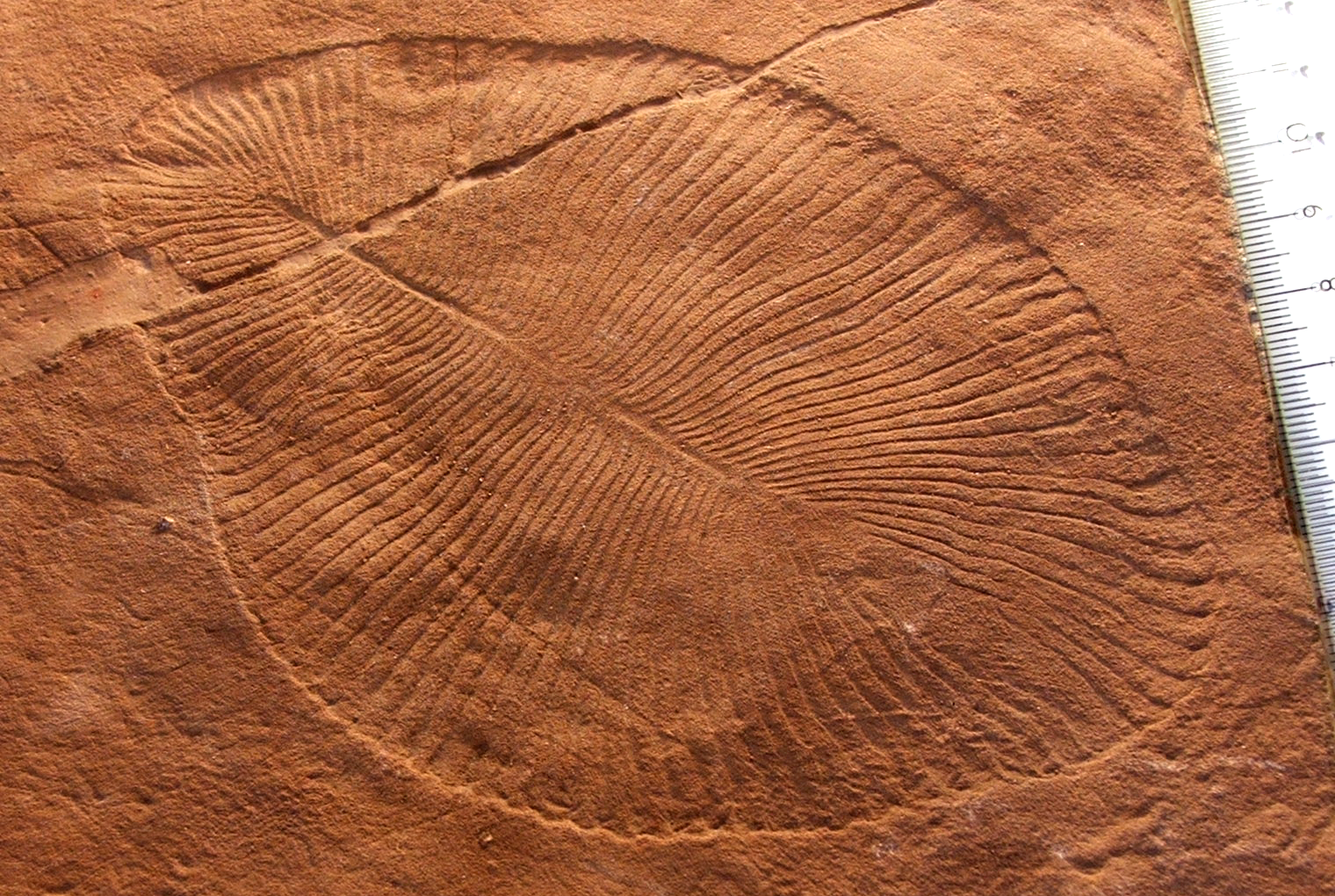
Dickinsonia costata

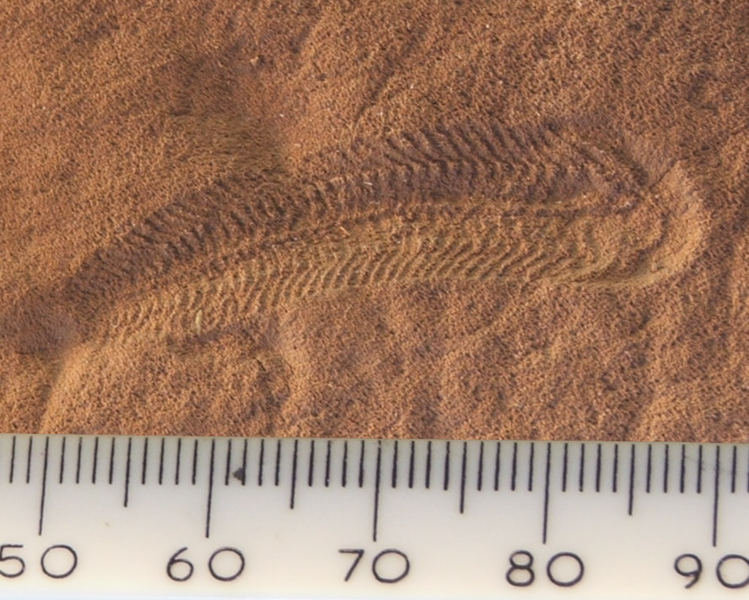
Spriggina floundersi

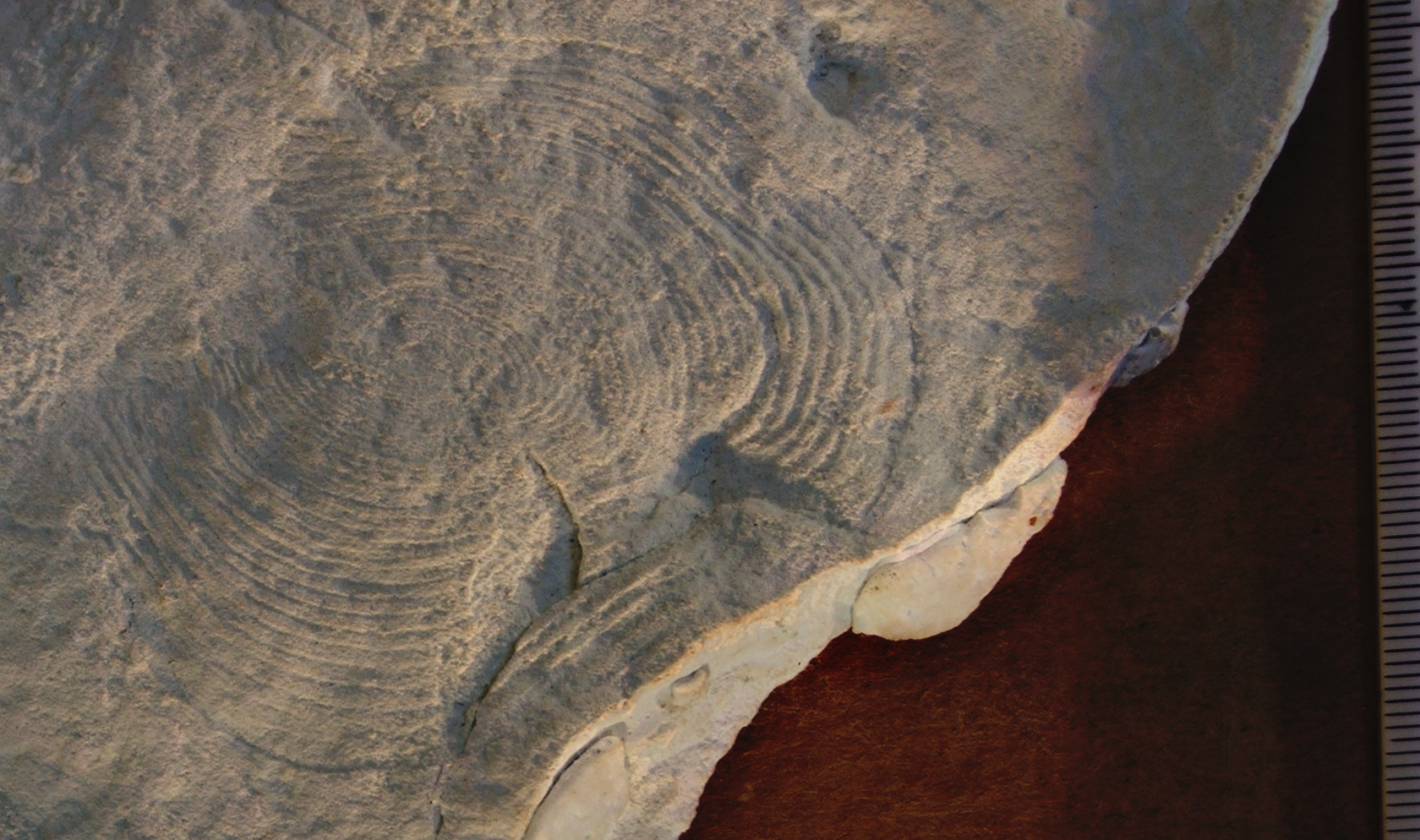
Ovatoscutum concentricum

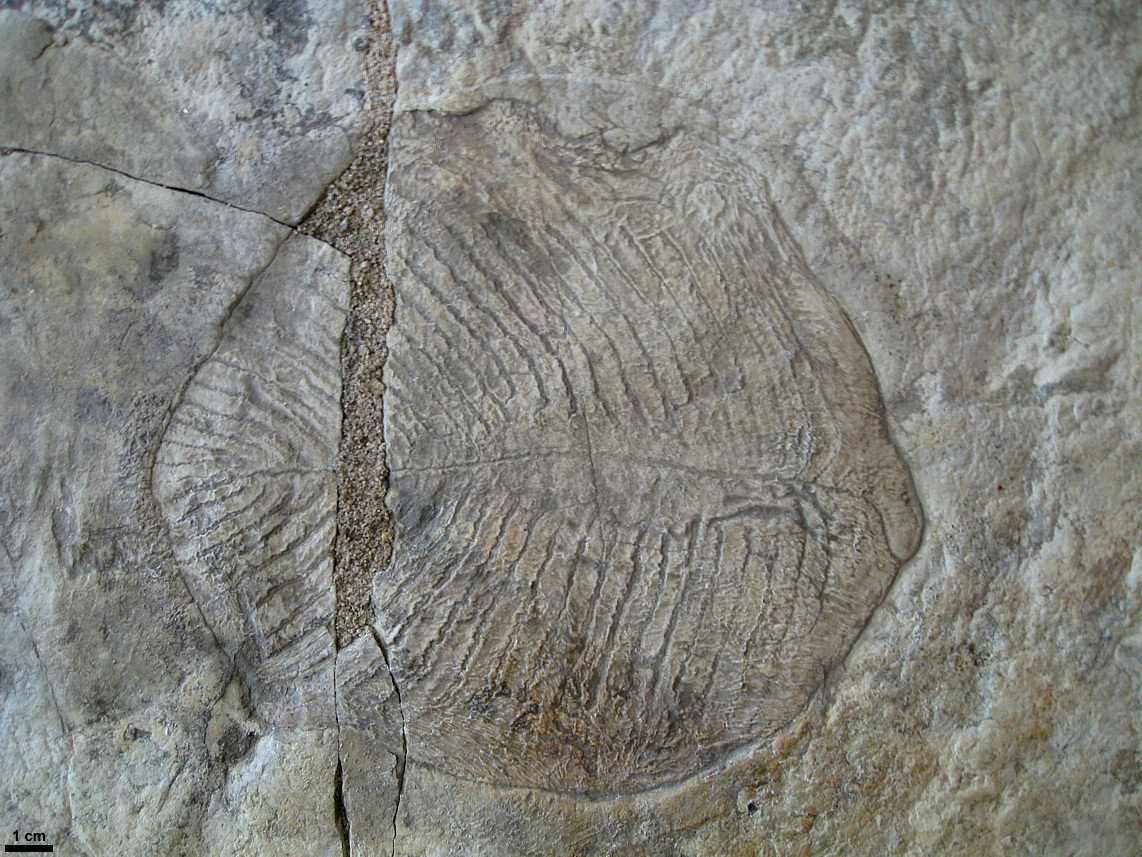
Yorgia waggoneri

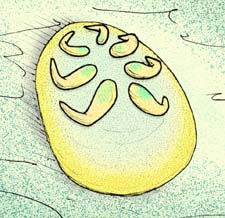
Tamga hamulifera

=== Body fossils ===
- Armillifera Fedonkin, 1980

A. parva Fedonkin, 1980

- Andiva Fedonkin, 2002

A. ivantsovi Fedonkin, 2002

- Archaeaspinus Ivantsov, 2007 (=Archaeaspis Ivantsov, 2001)

A. fedonkini Ivantsov, 2001

- Cephalonega Ivantsov et al., 2019

C. stepanovi (Fedonkin, 1976)

- Chondroplon Wade, 1971 (possible =Dickinsonia)

C. bilobatum Wade, 1971

- Cyanorus Ivantsov, 2004

C. singularis Ivantsov, 2004

- Dickinsonia Sprigg, 1947

D. costata Sprigg, 1947
D. menneri Keller 1976 (=Vendomia menneri Keller 1976)
D. tenuis Glaessner & Wade, 1966

- Ivovicia Ivantsov, 2007

I. rugulosa Ivantsov, 2007

- Karakhtia Ivantsov, 2004

K. nessovi Ivantsov, 2004

- Lossinia Ivantsov, 2007

L. lissetskii Ivantsov, 2007

- Marywadea Glaessner, 1976

M. ovata Glaessner & Wade, 1966

- Ovatoscutum Glaessner & Wade, 1966

O. concentricum Glaessner & Wade, 1966

- Paravendia Ivantsov, 2004

P. janae Ivantsov, 2001 (=Vendia janae Ivantsov, 2001)

- Podolimirus Fedonkin, 1983 (=Valdainia Fedonkin, 1983)

P. mirus Fedonkin, 1983 (Valdainia plumosa Fedonkin, 1983)

- Praecambridium Glaessner & Wade, 1966

P. siggilum Glaessner & Wade, 1966

- Spriggina Glaessner, 1958

S. floundersi Glaessner, 1958

- Tamga Ivantsov, 2007

T. hamulifera Ivantsov, 2007

- Vendia Keller, 1969

V. sokolovi Keller, 1969
V. rachiata Ivantsov, 2004

- ? Windermeria Narbonne, 1994

W. aitkeni Narbonne, 1994

- Yorgia Ivantsov, 1999

Y. waggoneri Ivantsov, 1999

=== Trace fossils ===
- Epibaion Ivantsov, 2002

E. axiferus Ivantsov, 2002.
E. waggoneris Ivantsov, 2011. This is a trace of Yorgia waggoneri
E. costatus Ivantsov, 2011. This is a trace of Dickinsonia costata

- Phyllozoon Jenkins & Gehling, 1978

P. hanseni Jenkins & Gehling, 1978

== See also ==
- Articulata
- List of Ediacaran genera
