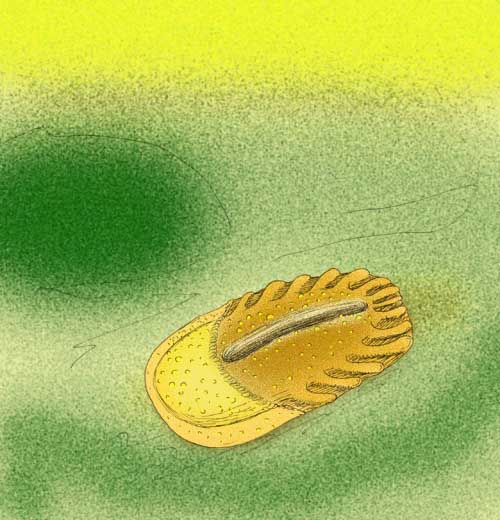
- Reconstruction of Lossinia lissetski.

Scientific classification
- Kingdom: Animalia
- Phylum: †Proarticulata
- Class: †Cephalozoa
- Genus: †Lossinia; Ivantsov, 2007
- Species: †L. lissetskii

Binomial name
- †Lossinia lissetskii Ivantsov, 2007

= Lossinia =

Lossinia Temporal range: late Ediacaran ~553 Ma

Extinct species of marine organism

Lossinia is an extinct organism from the late Ediacaran of Russia. It is a unique proarticulate, and is also a monotypic genus, containing only Lossinia lissetskii.

== Discovery and naming ==
The first fossils of Lossinia was found from the Ustʹ Pinega Formation of the Arkhangelsk Region, Northwest Russia, and was formally described and named in 2007.

The generic name Lossinia derives from the place name Losinoe Bog, near the type locality of the holotype fossil. The specific name lissetskii is in honour of Valery S. Lisetskii, keeper of the nearby Zimnegorskiy Lighthouse.

== Description ==
Lossinia lissetskii is a small, elongate proarticulate, getting up to 8.4 mm (0.3 in) in length, and 4.7 mm (0.2 in) in width. It is composed of a notable "head" region at its front, and a "trunk" region split down the middle by a narrow medial line, both of which are covered in small tubercles. The "head" is semicircular in shape, and gets up to 0.3 mm (0.0 in) in length. Meanwhile, the "trunk" consists of the standard isomers seen in all proarticulates, which are arranged in two rows either side of a smoother body region, with a narrow depression down the middle.

The covering of tubercles has been noted to be similar or the same as what is seen in other proarticulate genera, such as Cephalonega and Archaeaspinus. It would later be assigned under the family Cephalozoa, which contains both of the aforementioned genera.

== See also ==
- Tamga
- List of Ediacaran genera
