= Epibaion =

Epibaion Temporal range: Ediacaran, around 558–555 Ma

Trace fossil classification
- Ichnogenus: Epibaion; Ivantsov, 2002

Ichnospecies
- Epibaion axiferus Ivantsov, 2002 (type); Epibaion waggoneris Ivantsov, 2011; Epibaion costatus Ivantsov, 2011

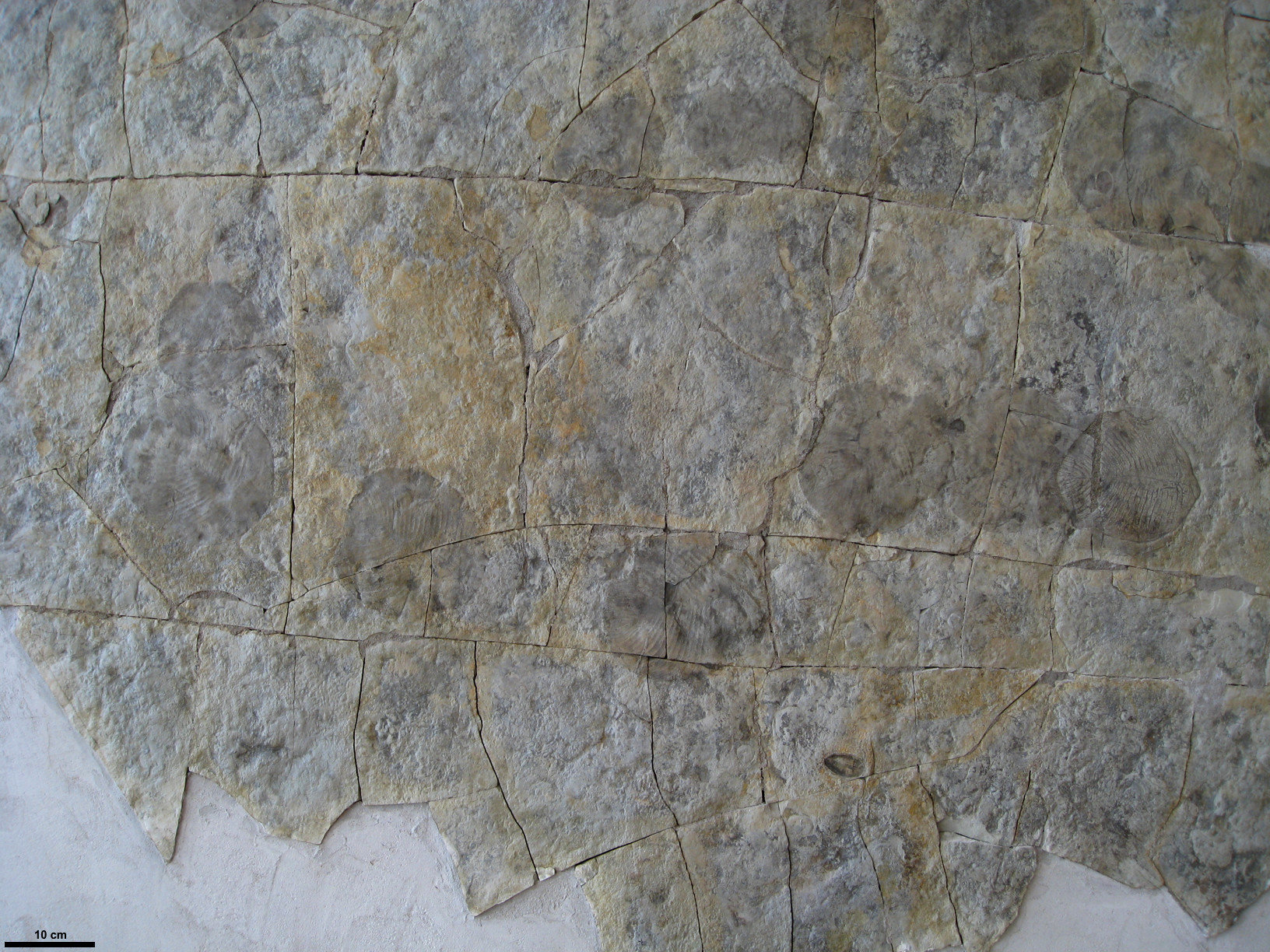
Epibaion waggoneris, chain of trace platforms and the imprint of the body of Yorgia waggoneri (right), which created these traces.

Epibaion is a trace fossil imprint of the Ediacaran animals of the phylum Proarticulata, which became extinct in the Precambrian. Imprints often occur in chains, which is interpreted as a feeding trace; some chains terminate in a body fossil, allowing their maker to be identified. Several specimens are known; E. waggoneris was produced by Yorgia waggoneri; E. costatus by Dickinsonia costata; and E. axiferus, the type species, has as yet not been found with a trace-maker. It is proposed that the Australian fossil Phyllozoon is also a feeding trace of Proarticulata.

== See also ==
- List of Ediacaran genera
