= Marywadea =

Marywadea Temporal range: late Ediacaran ~555 Ma
- Fossil of Marywadae ovata

Scientific classification
- Kingdom: Animalia
- Phylum: †Proarticulata
- Class: †Cephalozoa
- Family: †Sprigginidae
- Genus: †Marywadea; Glaessner, 1976
- Species: †M. ovata

Binomial name
- †Marywadea ovata Glaessner & Wade, 1966

Synonyms
- Spriggina ovata Glaessner & Wade, 1966

Extinct genus of proarticulatan fossil

Marywadea is an extinct proarticulate organism from the late Ediacaran of Australia. Originally described under Spriggina, it is a monotypic genus, containing only Marywadea ovata.

== Discovery and naming ==
The holotype fossil of Marywadea was found from the Ediacara Member of the Rawnsley Quartzite, in Nilpena Ediacara National Park, Flinders Ranges of South Australia in 1966, and was originally tentatively assigned under the genus Spriggina. In 1976, it would be redescribed and assigned under the new genus of Marywadea.

The generic name Marywadea is in honour of Dr. Mary Wade, who had originally noted that M. ovata may in fact be distinct from Spriggina even during the original 1966 description.

== Description ==
Marywadea ovata is an elongate organism, getting up to 31 mm (1.2 in) in length, and 15 mm (0.6 in) at its widest. Like most proarticulates, its bears the standard glided symmetry, meaning one side is slightly offset from the other side. It has a high number of isomers, ranging between 40 and 50 all together. Along these isomers there are also visible tubular structures along the alternating mid-line, which have been interpreted as gonads, similar to what is seen in Yorgia.

At what is considered the front, there is a notable half-moon shaped "head" region, which is usually thinner than the widest point, which also contains branching features that have been compared to the digestive caecae, similar to what is seen in arthropods.

== Affinities ==
When originally described under the genus Spriggina in 1966, Marywadea was considered to be that of a polychaete, which was the prevailing consensus at the time for other proarticulates, like Dickinsonia. When the original material, alongside new material, was redescribed some ten years later in 1976, Marywadea was made its own genus, but due to its similarities with Spriggina, it remained under the family Sprigginidae. At this point, a more Arthropoda interpretation for both Spriggina, and as such Marywadea, was becoming more favoured, although many still considered a Annelida affinity for both. But come 1979, a study made recounting all known annelids from the middle Cambrian at the time looked into the affinities of Marywadea, and other then known proarticulates, a noted that both interpretations to be highly unlikely.

In 2019, the family Sprigginidae, and thus Marywadea, was assigned to the class Cephalozoa, primarily due to the crescent shaped "head" region and small size.

== See also ==
- List of Ediacaran genera
