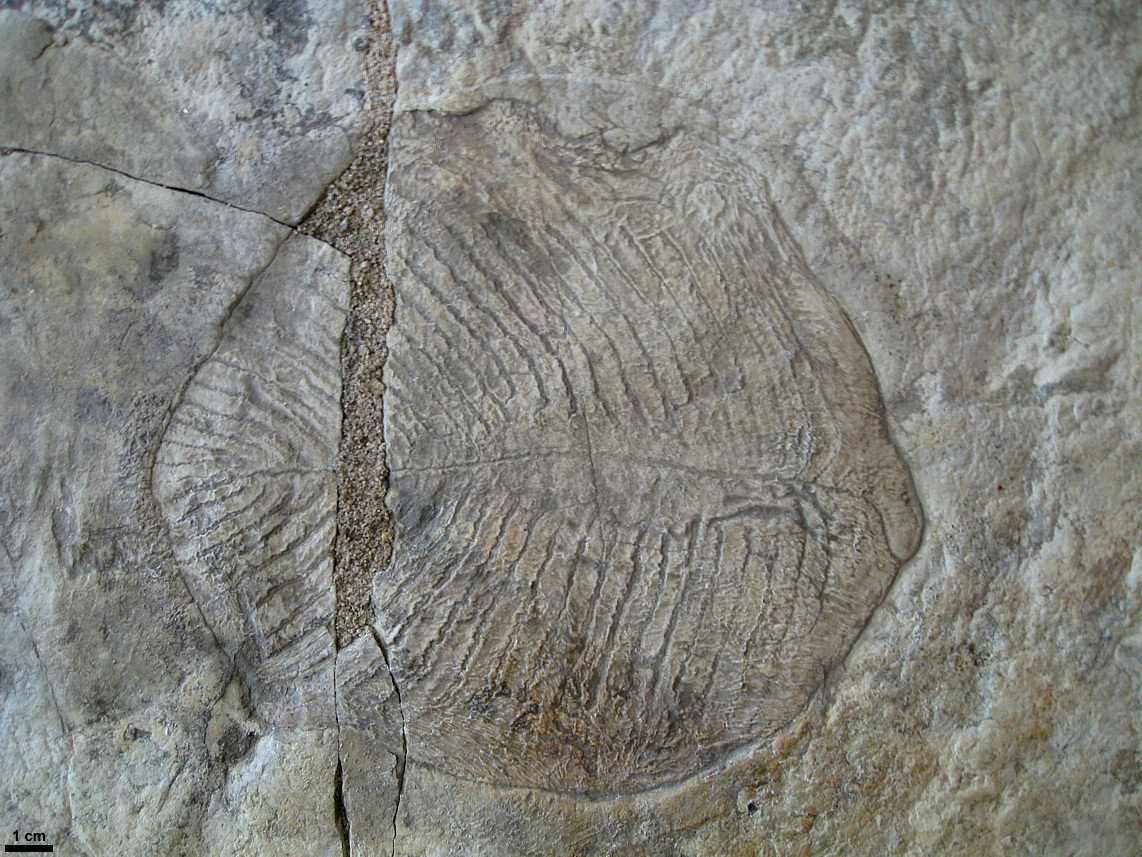
- Fossil of the type species, Yorgia waggoneri

Scientific classification
- Kingdom: Animalia
- Phylum: †Proarticulata
- Class: †Cephalozoa
- Family: †Yorgiidae; Ivantsov, 2001

Genera
- † Yorgia; † Archaeaspinus; † Ivovicia; † Praecambridium ?

= Yorgiidae =

Yorgiidae Temporal range: late Ediacaran ~571.0–551.0 Ma

Extinct family of simple segmented organisms

Yorgiidae is an extinct family of the class Cephalozoa, which is a part of the wider phylum Proarticulata. They were around from around 571 to 551 Ma, and are most notable for their distinctive 'head' region, with an equally distinctive hook-like isomer extending into this 'head' region.

== Description ==
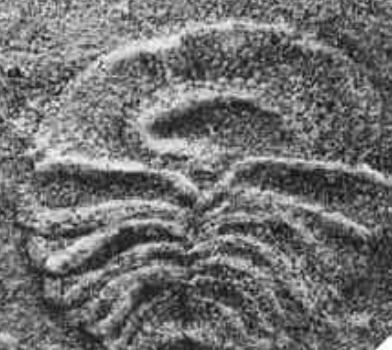
A fossil specimen of Archaeaspinus fedonkini, showing its distinctive unpaired lobe/isomer.

Like other relatives within the phylum Proarticulata, their body plan consists of isomers arranged in a glide symmetry, meaning they do not have true bilateral symmetry. As with other cephalozoans, their initial right isomer extends right across the body, forming a distinctive 'head', whilst they have a unique feature with their initial left isomer extending slightly to the right side and into the initial right isomer.

This is most prominent in the genus Archaeaspinus, with it having an unpaired left lobe/isomer within its 'head' region, forming a distinctive question mark-like shape.

== Distribution ==
Genera of the family Yorgiidae are most commonly found in the Ust' Pinega Formation and Central Urals of Russia, as well as the Flinders Ranges of South Australia.

== Taxonomy ==
Yorgiidae includes the following genera:

- †Archaeaspinus Ivantsov, 2007 (synonym of Archaeaspis)
  - †Archaeaspinus fedonkini Ivantsov, 2001
- †Yorgia Ivantsov, 1999
  - †Yorgia waggoneri Ivantsov, 1999
- †Ivovicia Ivantsov, 2007
  - †Ivovicia rugulosa Ivantsov, 2007
- †Praecambridium (?) Ivantsov, 1999
  - †Praecambridium sigillum (?) Ivantsov, 1999

Due to the rather small size of known Praecambridium specimens, and the large grain size of the matrix they are commonly found in, the placement of Praecambridium within family Yorgiidae is tentative, as it's hard to discern certain details in such small specimens, although most reconstructions show similarities with juvenile Yorgia, and may even be a larval stage. A more recent study also suggested that Praecambridium may be a juvenile, and possibly a juvenile of another cephalozoan, Spriggina, which occurs in the same beds as Praecambridium.

Andiva was previously assigned to the family Yorgiidae, although a recent study removes it from the family but still placed within the class Cephlazoa.

== See also ==
- Cephalozoa
