= Summer Coast =

Coast area in Arkhangelsk Oblast, Russia

Coordinates: 64.7419°N 38.4906°E

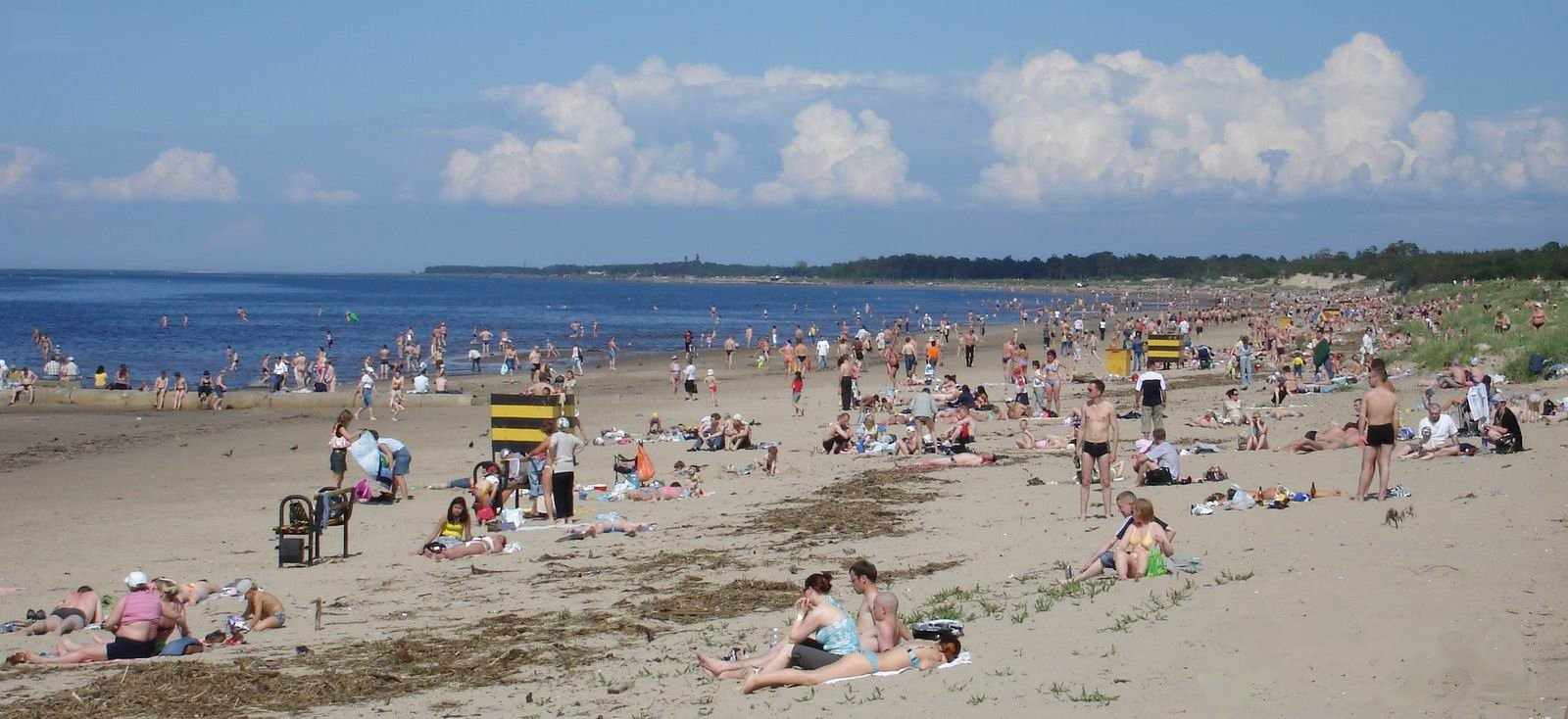
Yagry Island Beach in Severodvinsk, on the Summer Coast of the White Sea.

The Summer Coast (Letniy Bereg, Russian: Летний Берег) is a coastal area in Arkhangelsk Oblast in northwest Russia. It is located on the western side of the Dvina Bay in the White Sea, on the Onega Peninsula, between the Northern Dvina delta and Cape Ukhtnavolok, opposite to the Winter Coast. The names reflect the fact that the pomors of the Dvina Bay were fishing at Summer Coast and Winter Coast in the summer and in the winter, respectively.

Administratively, the Summer coast is shared between Primorsky District and the city of Severodvinsk of Arkhangelsk Oblast. Between 1940 and 1958, the coast was part of Belomorsky District, with the center in the selo of Pertominsk.

The villages of Nyonoksa, Syuzma, Krasnaya Gora, Pertominsk, Unsky, Yarenga, and Lopshenga are all located at the Summer Coast. The coast is crossed by the Una Bay, a gulf in the Dvina Bay, which is about 20 kilometres (12 mi) long. The villages of Una and Luda are located at the inner coast of the Una Bay. The coast was populated not later than 13th century by the Pomors, and fishery was their traditional occupation until the 1990s, when it went into decline. There are no all-season land routes to the villages of Krasnaya Gora, Pertominsk, Unsky, Yarenga, and Lopshenga, and the connections are either by sea (irregular), or by air from Arkhangelsk.
