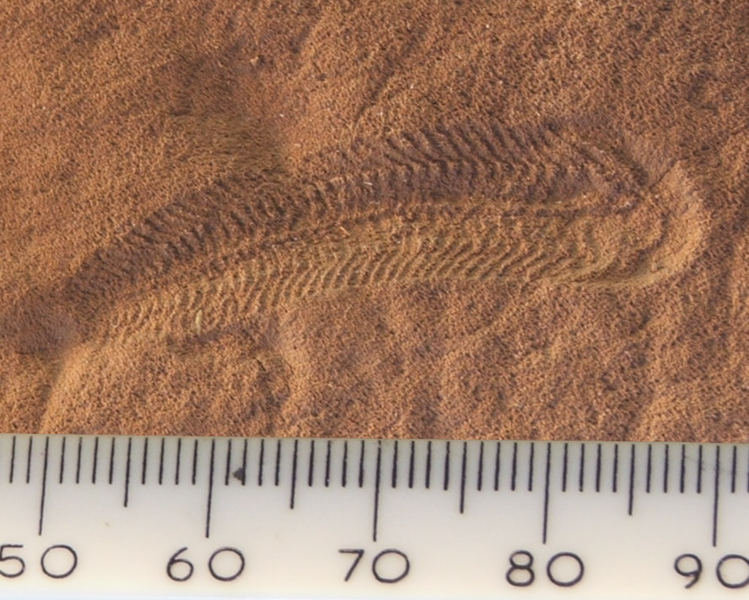
- Fossil of S. floundersi. Scale in millimetres

Scientific classification
- Kingdom: Animalia
- Phylum: †Proarticulata
- Class: †Cephalozoa
- Family: †Sprigginidae
- Genus: †Spriggina; Glaessner, 1958
- Species: †S. floundersi

Binomial name
- †Spriggina floundersi Glaessner, 1958

= Spriggina =

Spriggina Temporal range: Late Ediacaran, 555 Ma

Extinct genus of animals

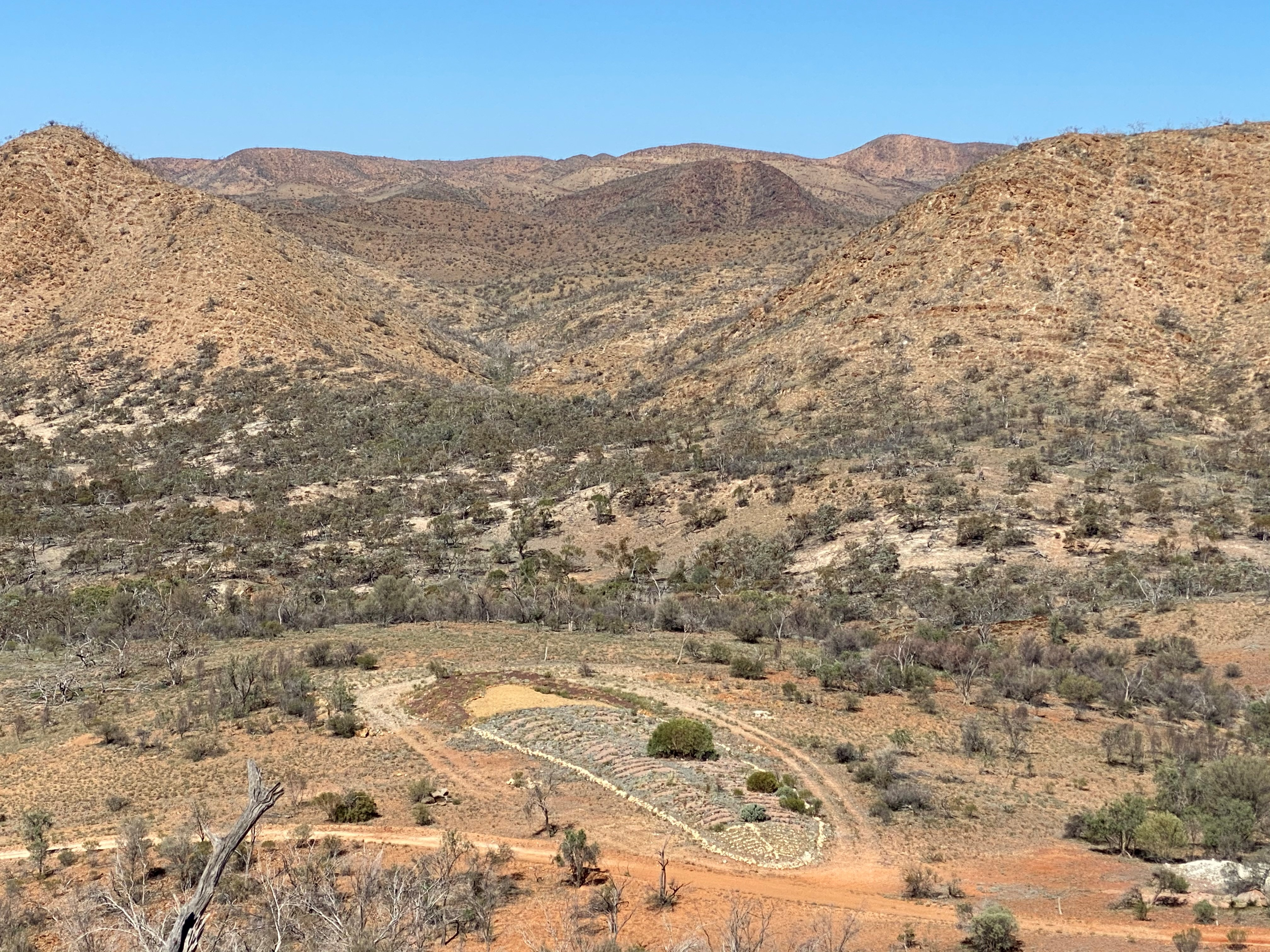
Large landscape model of Spriggina floundersi, located in Arkaroola Wilderness Sanctuary

Spriggina is a genus of early animals whose relationship to living animals is unclear. Fossils of Spriggina are known from the late Ediacaran period in what is now South Australia. Spriggina floundersi is the official fossil emblem of South Australia; it has been found nowhere else.

The organism reached 3–5 centimetres (1.2–2.0 in) in length and may have been predatory. Its bottom was covered with two rows of tough interlocking plates, while one row covered its top; its front few segments fused to form a "head".

The affinity of Spriggina is unknown; it has been variously classified as an annelid worm, a rangeomorph-like frond, a variant of Charniodiscus, a proarticulatan, an arthropod (perhaps related to the trilobites), or even an extinct phylum. The lack of known segmented legs or limbs, coupled with the presence of glide reflection instead of symmetric segments, suggests that an arthropod classification is unlikely despite some superficial resemblance.

The genus Spriggina originally contained three different species—S. floundersi, S. ovata, and S. borealis—but S. ovata is now considered a junior synonym of Marywadea ovata, while the phylogenetic status of S. borealis remains a subject of active debate.

== Description ==
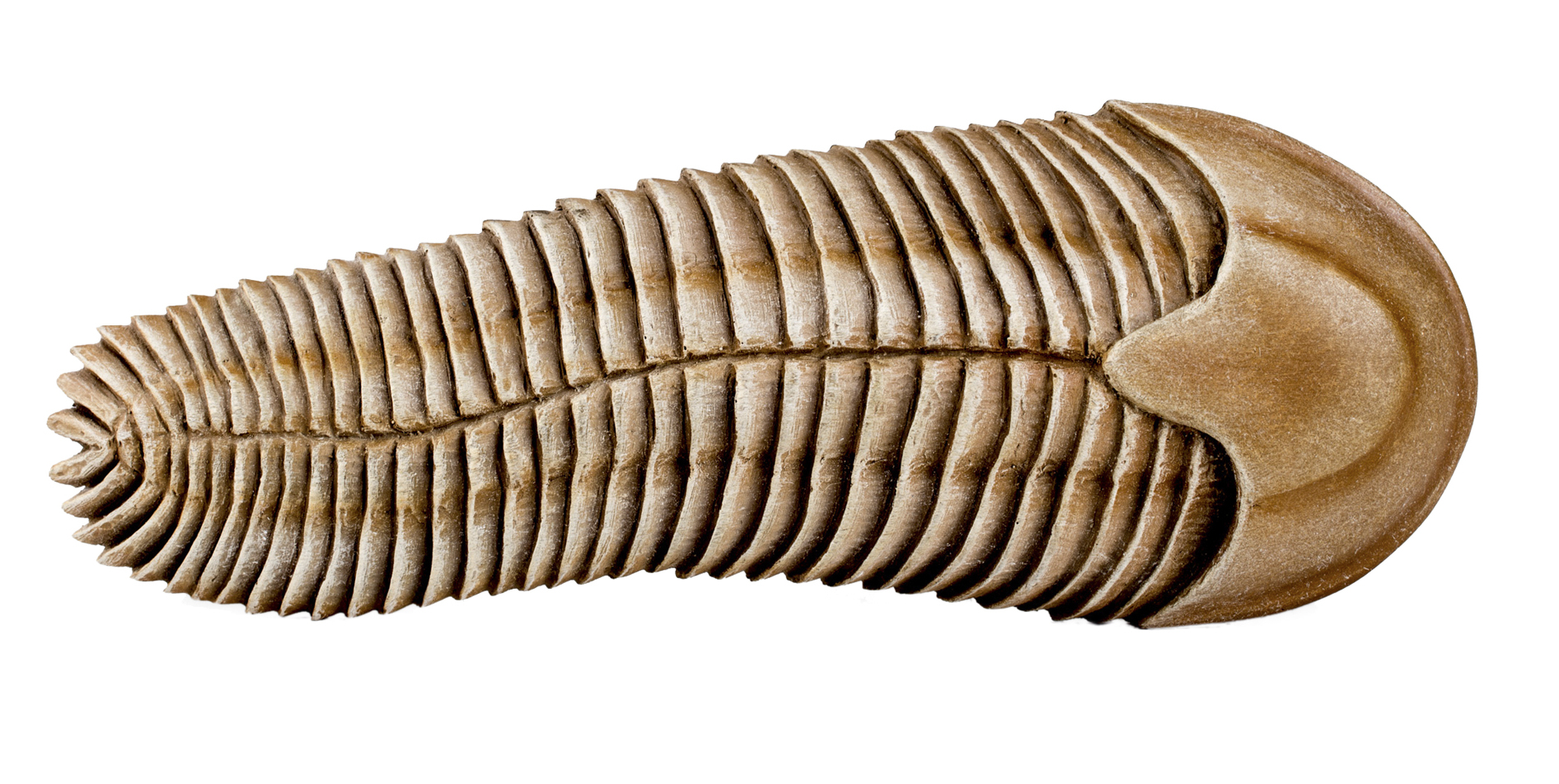
S. floundersi, life restoration at MUSE – Science Museum in Trento

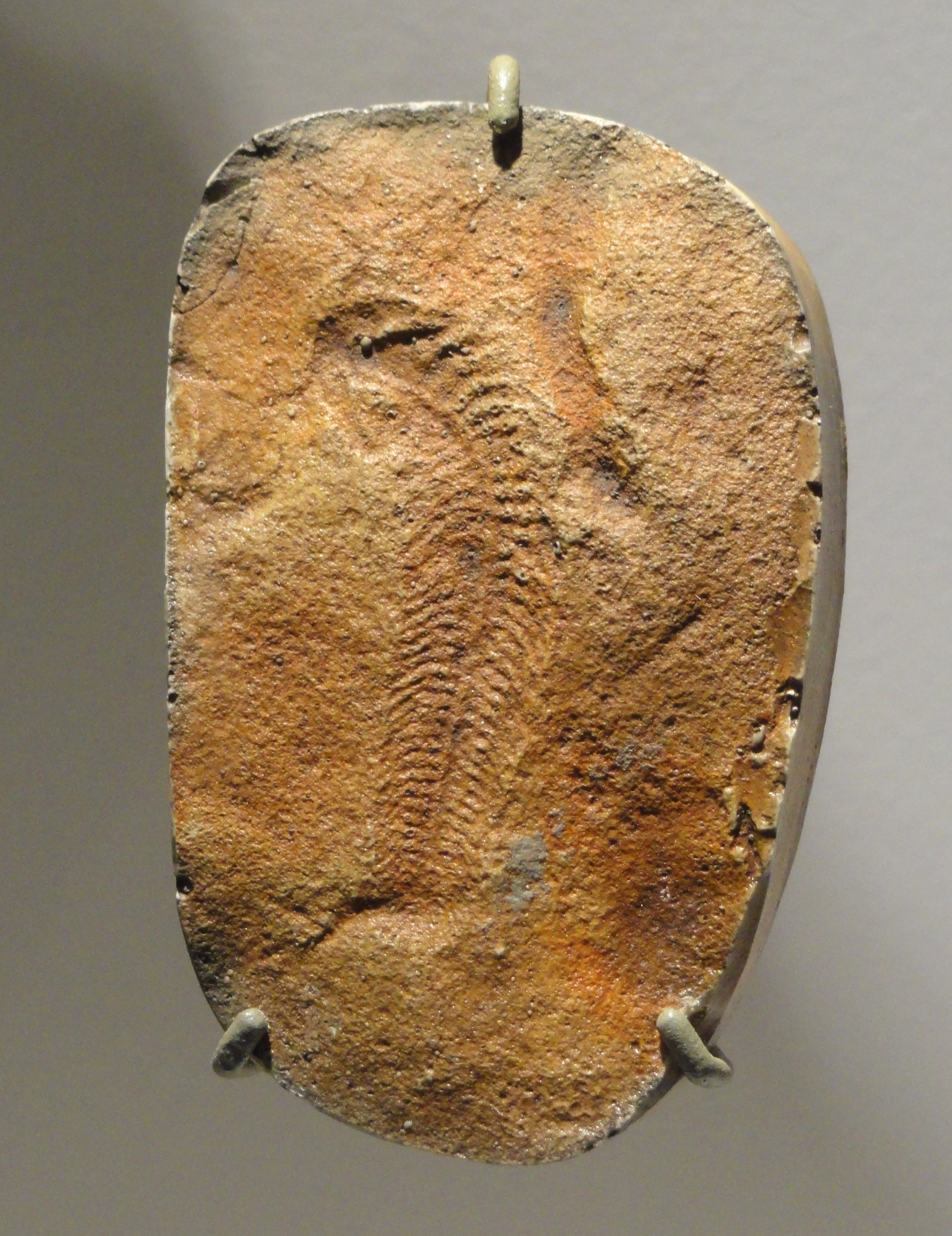
Cast of S. floundersi at Houston Museum of Natural Science

Spriggina grew to 3–5 centimetres (1.2–2.0 in) in length and was approximately oblong. The organism was segmented, with no fused segments; the segments were sometimes curved. The upper surface of the organism was covered by one row of overlapping cuticular plates, the underside with paired plates.

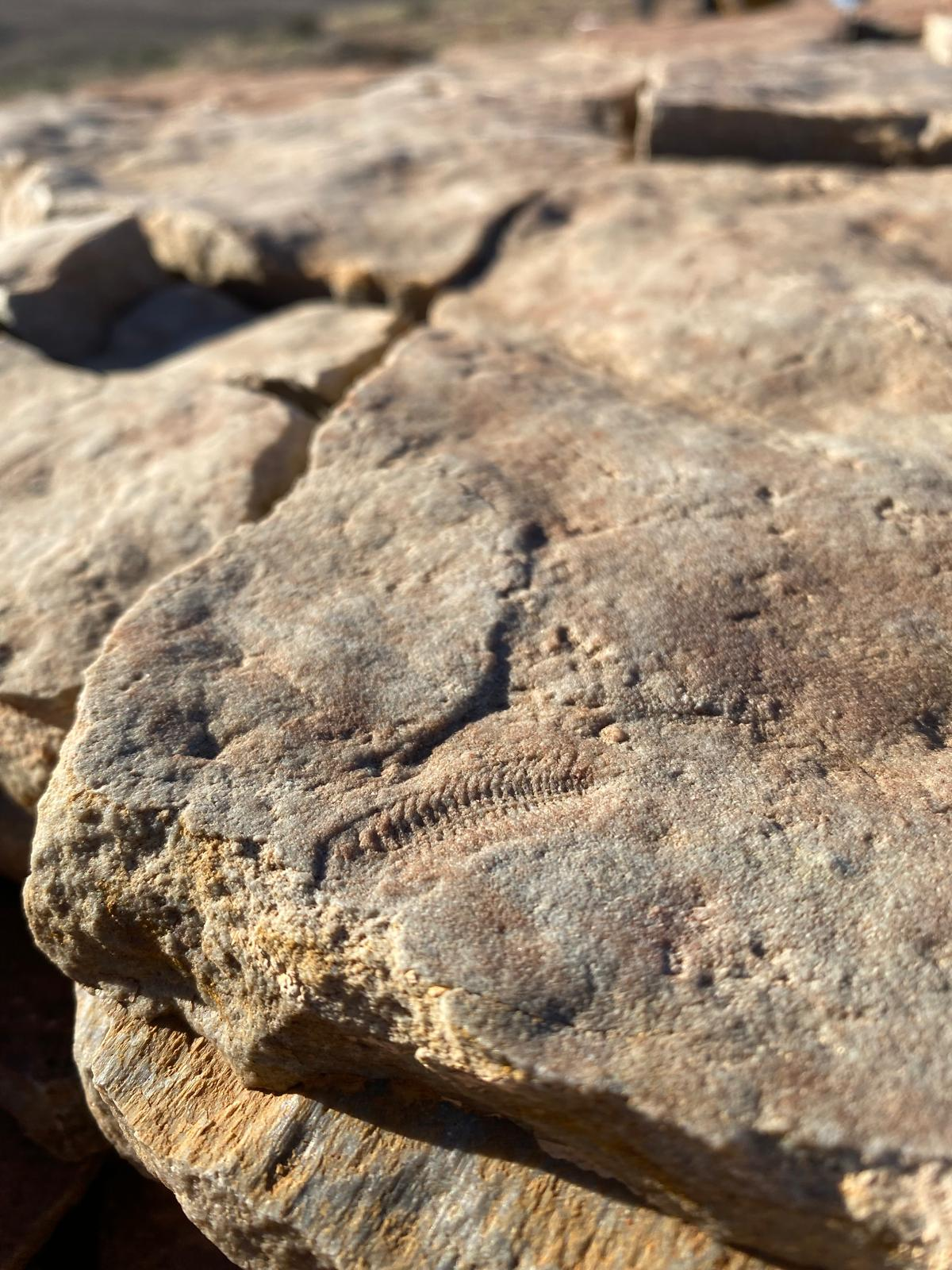
An example of Spriggina observed in situ at Nilpena Ediacara National Park

The first two segments formed a "head". The front segment had the shape of a horseshoe with a pair of depressions on its upper surface; these may have represented eyes. The second segment may have borne antennae. Subsequent segments bore annulations.

Some fossils have what may be a circular mouth at the centre of the semicircular head, although interpretation is hampered by the small size of the creature relative to the large grains of sandstones in which it is preserved. Legs are not preserved.

The symmetry observed is not exactly bilaterian but appears to be a glide reflection, where opposite segments are shifted by half an interval. In some specimens the body segments tilt backwards, making roughly chevron patterns; while in others they are more or less straight. There appear to be fairly complex variations between these two extremes.

== Discovery and naming ==
The genus was named after Reg Sprigg who discovered the fossils of the Ediacara Hills—part of the Flinders Ranges in South Australia—and was a proponent of their recognition as multicellular organisms. Spriggina floundersi is at present the only generally accepted species in this genus. The specific name "floundersi" refers to amateur South Australian fossil hunter Ben Flounders. Spriggina ovata has now been moved into its own genus, Marywadea.

Spriggina is known only from beds of Ediacaran age. Fossils from the Vindhyan basin, reliably dated to around 1,650 million years old, have been classified as Spriggina, but in all likelihood represent microbial artifacts.

Spriggina possessed a tough, though uncalcified body, evident from the fossils' preservation: always as a mould in the lower surface of the fossiliferous bed.

== Classification ==
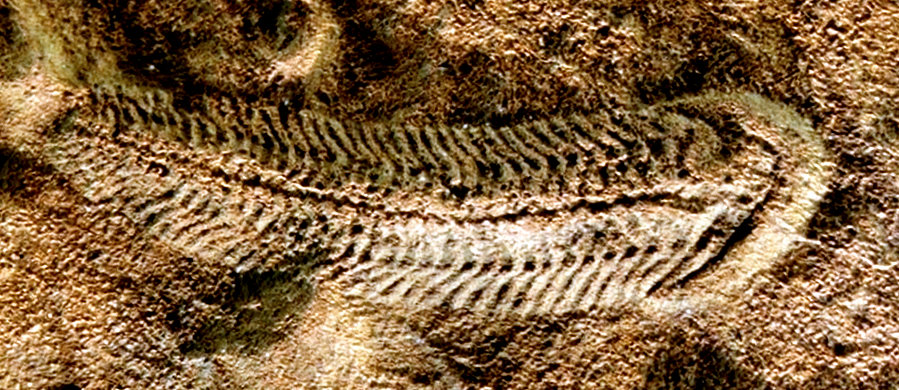
Digitally enhanced image of a Spriggina fossil

Like many of the Ediacara biota, the relationship of Spriggina to other groups is unclear. It bears some similarity to the living polychaete worm Tomopteris and Amphinomidae, but its lack of chaetae, along with other lines of evidence, suggests that it cannot be placed in this phylum. It was also compared to the rangeomorphs, frondose members of the Ediacara biota that may represent a separate kingdom. While its glide symmetry may suggest otherwise, some researchers like Mark McMenamin suggested Spriggina would be an arthropod; its superficial resemblance to the trilobites may suggest a close relationship to this class, and that it may have even been predatory in nature. However, later studies do not consider such Ediacaran biota like it and Parvancorina to be stem-arthropods, as they do not share compelling characters with arthropods, and there are no definite proof to make them related to arthropods or other extant bilaterians. This similarity to trilobites could also be an example of convergent evolution.

== Affinity ==
At first, Spriggina was thought to resemble a polychaete worm such as Nereis, but a close look at the segmentation reveals that the segments do not match across the midline, just as in Dickinsonia. In 1989 Seilacher turned the interpretation upside-down, suggesting that Spriggina could be another type of sea-pen, and that the 'head' was actually a holdfast.

A relationship with arthropods has also been suggested because of superficial similarities with the Cambrian trilobite, but the lack of limbs and exoskeleton casts profound doubt on an arthropod affinity. Furthermore, the broad pleural lobes of trilobites served primarily as a rigid hood under which the legs could process the sediment for food.

== South Australia's fossil emblem ==
In 14 February 2017 the Spriggina was adopted as South Australia's fossil emblem, due the fact it has not been found anywhere else. The uniqueness of this Ediacaran fossil has led it to become the official fossil emblem of South Australia, the 550-million-year-old fossil was chosen for best representing the state's geological and scientific prowess. More than 3500 South Australians cast their vote for a fossil to become the state's new emblem in an online poll.

== Palaeobiology and palaeoecology ==
Spriggina is thought to have lived close to or on the sea floor. Many specimens show missing portions along the margins of the organism that are thought to represent portions of the body lifted up off the sea floor. The apparent irregular morphology of the "head" in Spriggina fossils may further indicate Spriggina could lift it off of the substrate as well. It is therefore thought that Spriggina may have been motile.

Spriggina specimens that are bent to the left (which would have been the organism's right in life) significantly outnumber those bent to the right, suggesting behavioural handedness in Spriggina. This is thought to be the oldest known instance of behavioural handedness in the fossil record.

== See also ==
- Yorgia
- Dickinsonia
- List of Ediacaran genera
