= Martin Glaessner =

Austrian palaeontologist (1906-1989)

Martin Fritz Glaessner
- Born: 25 December 1906; Aussig, Austro-Hungarian Empire
- Died: 23 November 1989 (aged 82); Melbourne, Australia
- Education: University of Vienna (1925–1931); University of Melbourne (1946)
- Awards: Lyell Medal (1974); Walcott Medal (1982); Eduard Suess Medal (1985); Order of Australia (AM)
- Scientific career
- Fields: Geology, paleontology
- Workplaces: Naturhistorisches Museum, Vienna (1923–1932); Natural History Museum, London (1930–1931); University of Moscow (1936); University of Adelaide, Australia (1950–1989); South Australian Museum (1953–1989)

Martin Fritz Glaessner AM (25 December 1906 – 23 November 1989) was a geologist and palaeontologist. Born and educated in the Austro-Hungarian Empire, he spent the majority of his life in working for geoscientific institutes in Austria, Russia, Australia, and studying the geology of the South Pacific in Papua New Guinea and[Australia. Glaessner also did early work on the classification of the pre-Cambrian lifeforms now known as the Ediacaran biota, which he proposed were the early antecedents of modern lifeforms.

== Life and career ==
Glaessner was born in Aussig in the former Kingdom of Bohemia of the Austro-Hungarian Empire (now Ústí nad Labem in the Czech Republic). He was a research associate at the Naturhistorisches Museum in Vienna from 1923 to 1932, and starting in 1925, attended the University of Vienna, where he received a doctorate in law in 1929, and a Ph.D. in geology and paleontology in 1931. He was a research associate at the Natural History Museum, London from 1930 to 1931.

In 1932, he moved to Moscow and began working in petrogeology at the State Petroleum Research Institute until 1934. From 1934 to 1937, he worked as a Senior Research Officer at the Institute of Mineral Fuels of the Russian Academy of Sciences and was also a part-time lecturer at the University of Moscow's Moscow Petroleum Institute and Palaeontological Institute in 1936. Glaessner married Tina Tupikina in 1936, and moved back to Vienna in December late 1937. Of Jewish descent on his father's side, he was arrested on 19 March 1938 but released to work at the Anglo-Iranian Oil Company in London.

Later in 1938, he moved to Port Moresby, Territory of New Guinea (then under Australian control), where he worked for joint oil exploration companies until 1950. He held various positions at the University of Adelaide from 1950 to 1989, including chair of Geology and Palaeontology in 1964. He was an associate at the South Australian Museum from 1953 to 1989.

== Awards ==
Glaessner received the Lyell Medal of the Geological Society, the Walcott Medal of the National Academy of Sciences in 1982, the Verco Medal awarded by the Royal Society of South Australia (1970), and the Eduard Suess Medal of the Geological Society of Austria (1985). He became a fellow of the Australian Academy of Science in 1957 and was on its council from 1960 to 1962. He was a chairman of the National Committee of Geological Sciences from 1962 to 1977. He was made a Member of the Order of Australia in 1985. He was an Honorary Research Associate at the American Museum of Natural History from 1950 to 1970.

== Major publications ==
- Crustacea Decapoda (1930)
- Principles of Micropalaeontology (1945)
- Field Guide to the Study of Larger Foraminifera
- Time-stratigraphy and the Miocene Epoch
- Stratigraphic nomenclature in Australia
- Three foraminiferal zones in the Tertiary of Australia
- The Dawn of Animal Life (1984)
