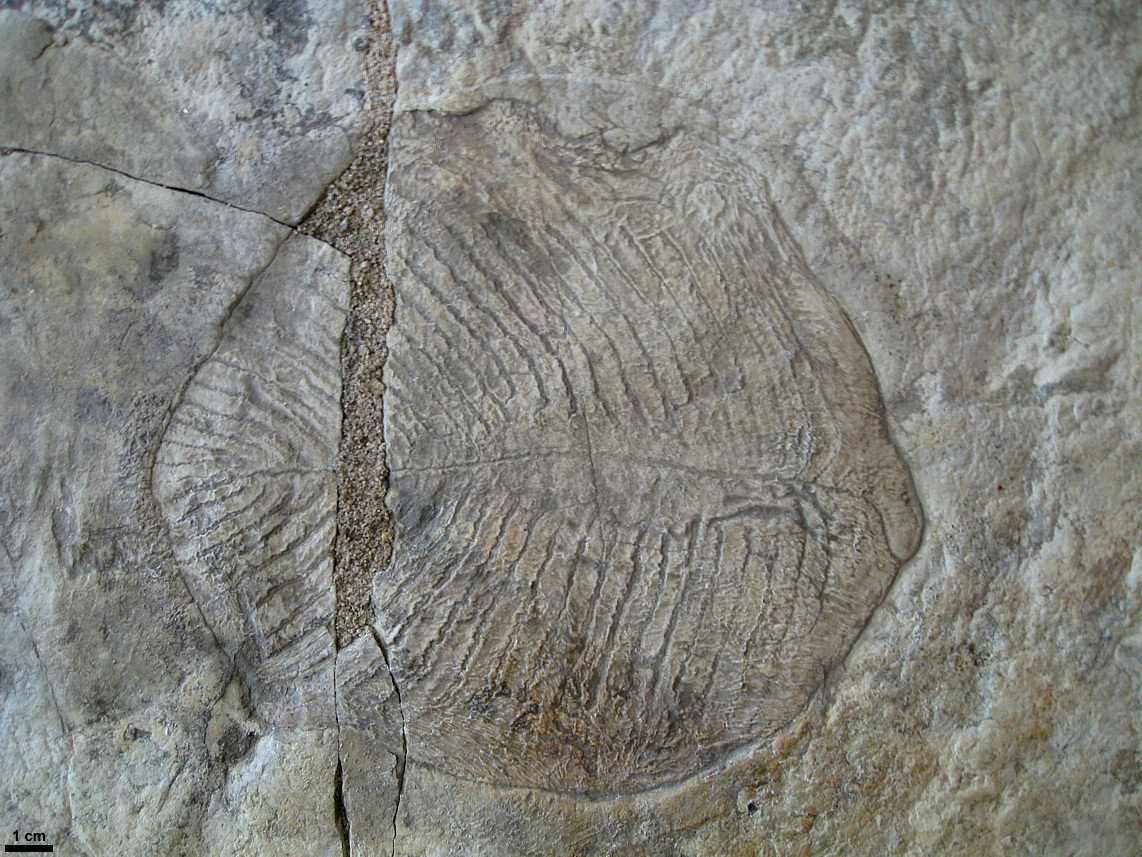
- Fossil of Yorgia waggoneri
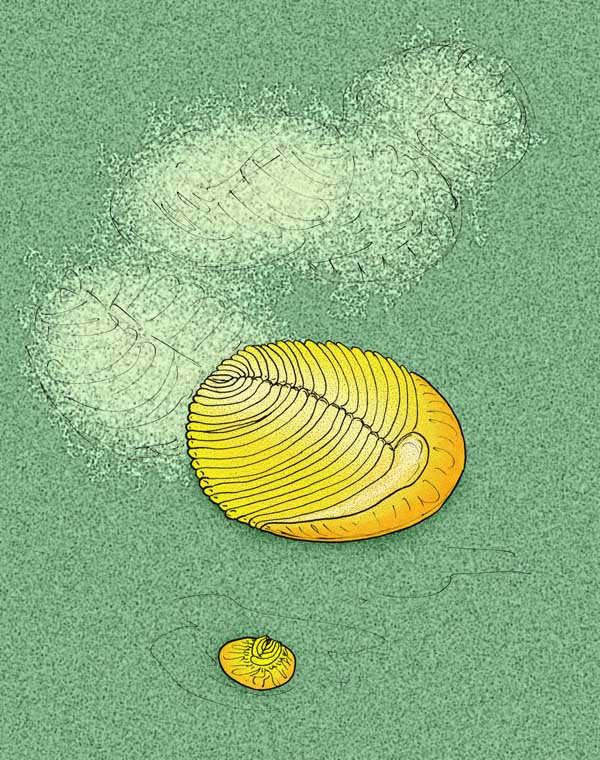
- Live restoration with a juvenile Yorgia

Scientific classification
- Kingdom: Animalia
- Phylum: †Proarticulata
- Class: †Cephalozoa
- Family: †Yorgiidae
- Genus: †Yorgia; Ivantsov, 1999
- Species: †Y. waggoneri

Binomial name
- †Yorgia waggoneri Ivantsov, 1999

= Yorgia =

Yorgia waggoneri Temporal range: Ediacaran 555.5 Ma

Extinct proarticulate animal

Yorgia waggoneri is a discoid Ediacaran organism. It has a low, segmented body consisting of a short wide "head", no appendages, and a long body region, reaching a maximum length of 25 cm (9.8 in). It is classified within the extinct animal phylum Proarticulata.

== Etymology ==
The generic name Yorgia comes from the Yorga river on the Zimnii Bereg (Winter Coast) of the White Sea, where the first specimens were found. The specific name Yorgia waggoneri honors the American paleontologist Ben Waggoner, who found the first specimen.

== Morphology ==
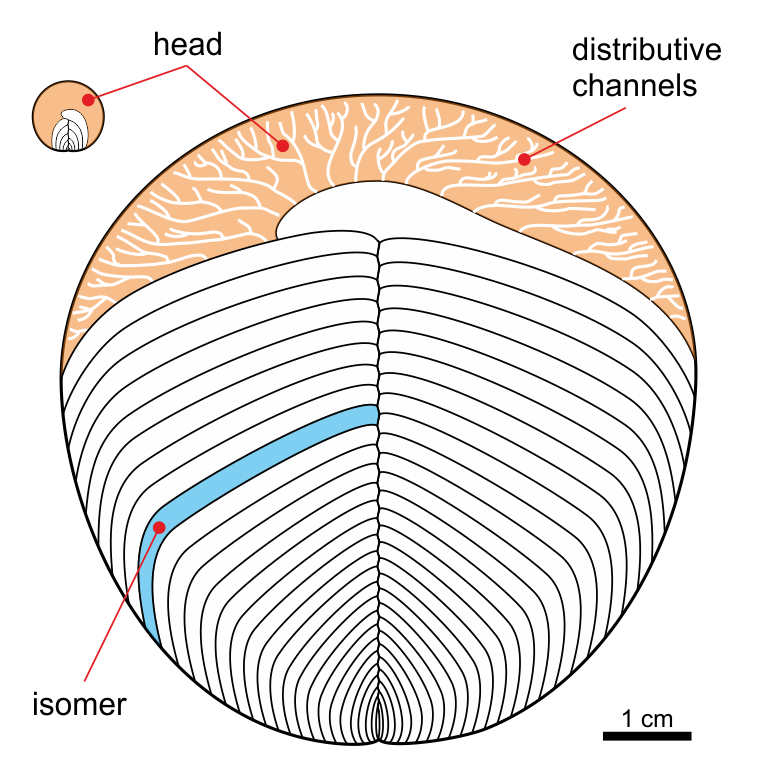
Sketch reconstruction of the anatomy of Yorgia waggoneri and its ontogeny

The body plan of the Yorgia and other proarticulates is unusual for solitary (non-colonial) metazoans. These bilateral organisms have segmented metameric bodies, but left and right transverse elements (isomers) are organized in an alternating pattern relatively to the axis of the body – they are not direct mirror images. This phenomenon is described as the symmetry of glide reflection, which is a characteristic also found in the similar Spriggina. Some proarticulates (Yorgia, Archaeaspinus) demonstrate obvious asymmetry of left and right parts of the body. Yorgia’s initial isomer (on the right side, nearest the head) is the only one that extends across the median dividing left and right sides. This lack of true bilateral symmetry, along with other considerations, has led some scientists to suspect that the organism falls in a sister group to the eumetazoa (i.e. all animals except Parazoa).

The integument of the dorsal side were unsegmented and covered with small tubercles, same as with Cephalonega, Lossinia, Archaeaspinus and some Dickinsonia.

== Fossil record ==
Imprints of the species Yorgia waggoneri have been found in the rocks of Vendian period (Ediacaran) White Sea region of Russia, dated around 555.5 Ma, and Yorgia sp. has been found in the Central Urals of Russia and Flinders Ranges, Australia. Most body imprints of Yorgia have in the past been primarily preserved on the sole of sandstone beds in negative relief. Other Yorgia fossils show internal structure in the original organism, showing two symmetrical rows of nodules, a central tube, rib-like tubes, and a semicircular shape with a hole in the circle centre positioned towards the head end. This structure has been interpreted as the impression of gonads, intestine and mouth.

=== Trace fossils ===
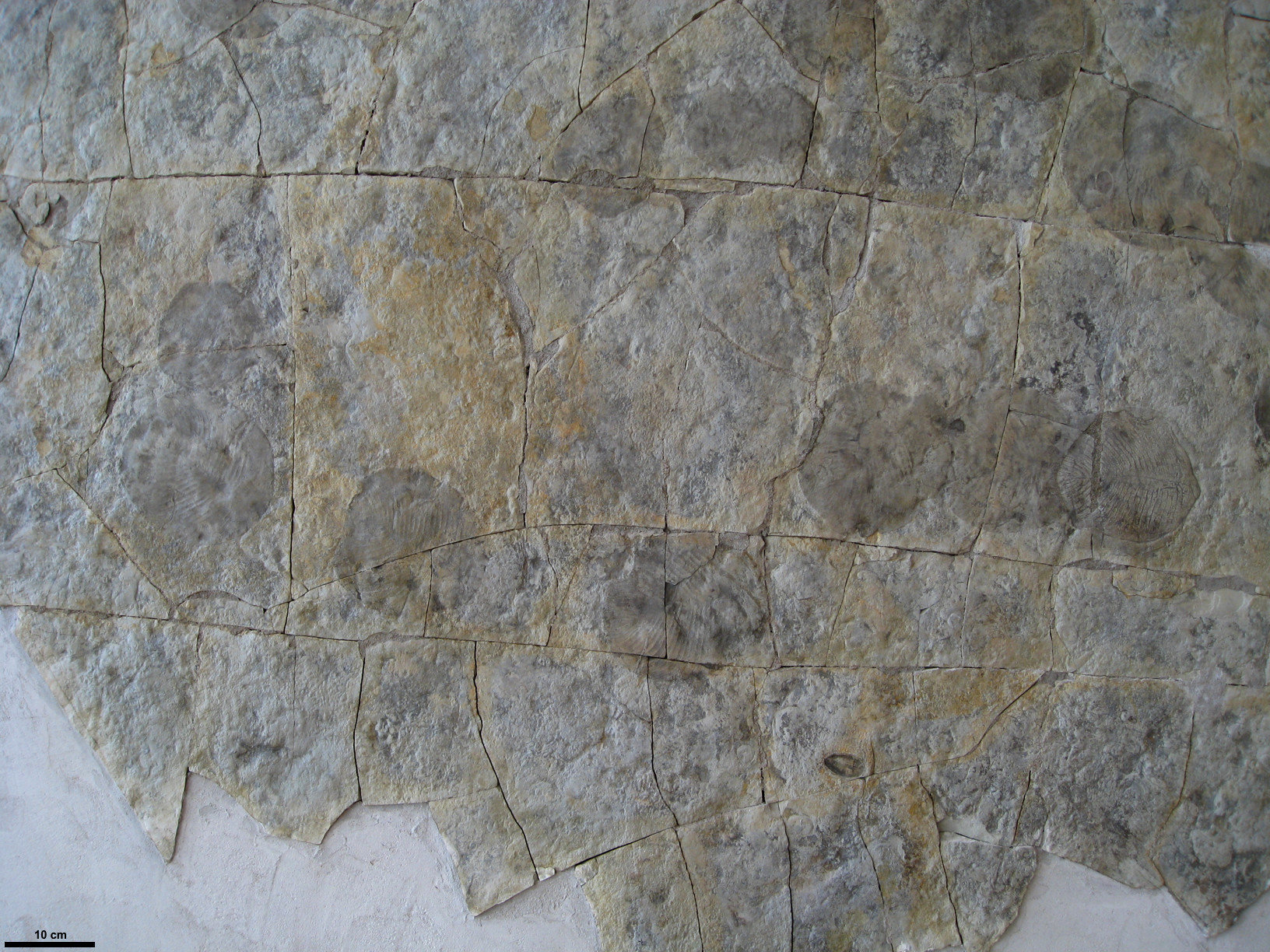
Epibaion waggoneris, chain of trace platforms and the imprint of the body of Yorgia waggoneri (right), which created these traces.

Some fossils appear as chains of positive imprints (the ichnospecies Epibaion waggoneris), terminated by the negative imprint of the animal. Such positive imprints are confined to the "elephant skin" surface texture that is interpreted as the remains of a microbial film. They have been interpreted as the feeding tracks produced as Yorgia fed on the surface of the microbial mat that lined the sea floor. Grazing of that bacterial film could have been accomplished by the work of numerous hair-like organs, cilia, located on the ventral side of the body, which caught and transported particles of the food substrate into the special elongated pockets arranged on the borders between the isomers. Chevron-like marks on the positive imprints have been taken as evidence of this cilia activity. This feeding habit is unknown in post-Ediacaran deposits.

Taphonomic details revealed in Yorgia allow interpretation of the chains of positive imprints of other proarticulates as grazing traces, as opposed to trails created as organisms were swept along the sea floor by currents. In addition to Yorgia, two fossil taxa, Epibaion and Phyllozoon, seem to have produced similar grazing traces. Small groups of positive body imprints are documented for Dickinsonia costata as well and Dickinsonia cf. tenuis.

== See also ==
- List of Ediacaran genera
