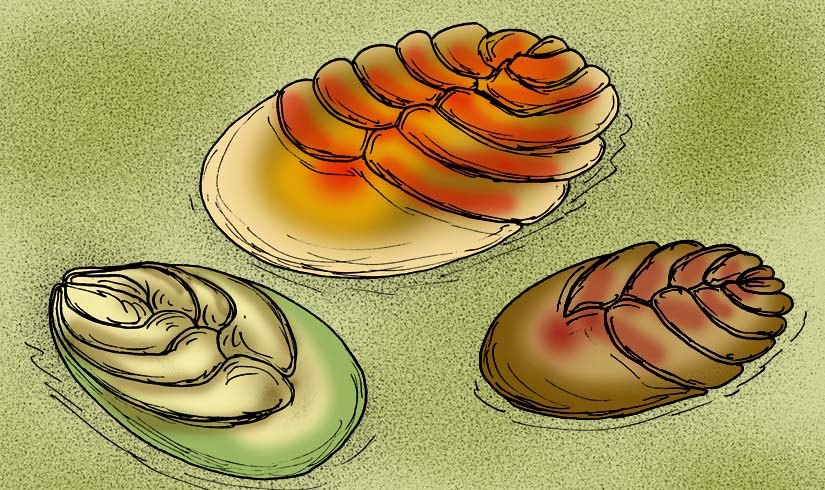
- Paravendia janae, Vendia sokolovi, V. rachiata

Scientific classification
- Kingdom: Animalia
- Phylum: †Proarticulata
- Class: †Vendiamorpha; Fedonkin, 1985

Families and genera
- Family Vendiidae Ivantsov (preliminary name); Vendia Keller, 1969; Paravendia Ivantsov, 2004; Karakhtia ? Ivantsov, 2004

= Vendiamorpha =

Vendiamorpha Temporal range: Late Ediacaran, between 567–550 Ma

Extinct class of simple animals

Vendiamorpha is a class of extinct animals within the Ediacaran phylum Proarticulata.

The typical vendiamorph had an oval-shaped or round-shaped body divided completely into segmented isomers, that were arranged alternately in two rows with reference to the longitudinal axis of the body.

== Description ==
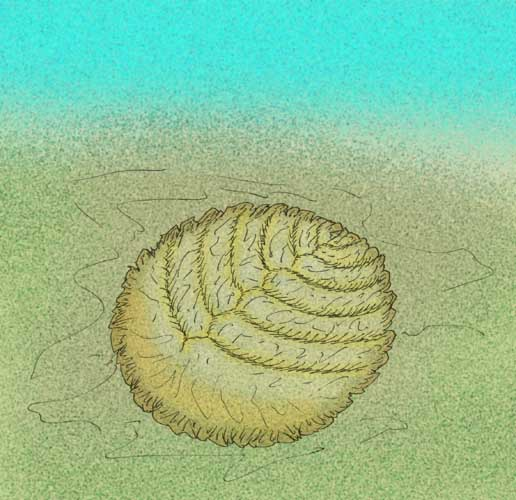
Karakhtia

The phenomenon of left-right alternating segments is called glide reflection symmetry, and is a diagnostic feature of proarticulates. Transverse elements decrease in size from one end to the other and are inclined in the same direction. Typically, the first few, or largest initial isomers are fused together to form a headshield-like structure, leading some researchers to have originally considered them to be ancestral or related to arthropods, though, overwhelming evidence of them being proarticulates have since led researchers to discard this hypothetical relationship.

Some vendiamorphs (e.g., Vendia and Paravendia) supposedly demonstrate a digestive-distributive system consisting of a simple axial tube and lateral appendages, with one lateral appendage corresponding to one isomer. The tentative vendiamorph Karakhatia is unique from the other members, as well as all proarticulates, in the fact that it has been noted to bearing 'coarse radial folds' around its outer margin, which has given it a noticeably frilly appearance, has been likened to what is seen in material of Haootia.

== Taxonomy ==
Vendiamorpha currently contains the singular Family Vendiidae (Originally Vendomiidae, derived from Vedomia, which was later synonymised into Dickinsonia.):

Family †Vendiidae Ivantsov, 2007

- †Vendia Ivantsov, 2001
  - †Vendia sokolovi Keller, 1969
  - †Vendia rachiata Ivantsov, 2004
- †Paravendia Ivantsov, 2004
  - †Paravendia janae Ivantsov, 2004
- †Karakhtia (?) Ivantsov, 2004
  - †Karakhtia nessovi Ivantsov, 2004

Due to the crumpled nature of most Karakhtia specimens and the aforementioned presence of coarse radial folds, the placement of it within Vendiamorpha, and Proarticulata itself, is tentative.

== Distribution ==
All members of Vendiamorpha are restricted to the Ust' Pinega Formation of Syuzma and Onega Rivers in Arkhangelsk Oblast, northwestern Russia.

== Name ==
The clade name Pseudovendia refers to the resemblances to a fossil imprint described as Vendia sokolovi. Originally, that fossil was interpreted as an arthropod, later as a proarticulatan, then conjectured as possibly a frond-like organism.

Current scientific consensus now recognizes the poorly preserved holotype of Pseudovendia as a pseudofossil.

== See also ==
- List of Ediacaran genera
