= Annulatubus =

Annulatubus Temporal range: late Ediacaran ~553–541 Ma

Scientific classification
- Kingdom: Animalia (?)
- Genus: †Annulatubus; Grazhdankin et al., 2008
- Species: †A. flexuosus

Binomial name
- †Annulatubus flexuosus Grazhdankin et al., 2008

Genus of tube-like animals

Annulatubus is a genus of the Ediacaran Biota (635 – 542 Ma) found in Northwest Canada, and Northern Siberia. It has been found in both shallow water and deep-water assemblages no older than 560 Ma placing it within the youngest Ediacaran. The only known species within the genus is Annulatubus flexuosus.

== Discovery and naming ==
Fossils of Annulatubus were discovered in the Blueflower Formation from the Mackenzie Mountains of Northwest Canada, and described in 2015.

The generic name Annulatubus derives from the Latin words 'annulatus', to mean 'ringed'; and 'tubus', to mean 'tube', due to the morphology of the fossils. The specific name derives from the Latin word 'flexuosus', to mean 'flexible', again owing to the appearance of the fossils.

== Description ==
Annulatubus flexuosus is a long tube-like structure with uniformly spaced ridges, with some growing up to lengths between 178–250 mm (7.0–9.8 in), and widths between 15–50 mm (0.59–1.97 in). This makes it significantly larger than most other tube-like fossils of the Ediacaran. The ridges along the tube are spaced every 5 mm (0.20 in).

It is described as having a similar ringed tube structure to Sekwitubulus, another tubular organism from the same formation, but differs in overall size and ridge shape, and unlike Sekwitubulus, it is unknown if Annulatubus possessed a holdfast.

== Ecology ==
The lifestyle of Annulatubus is unknown, other than it has been found in both shallow and deep-water deposits.

== Distribution ==
Annulatubus has been found in the sandstone beds of the Blueflower Formation in Northwest Canada, and in the Late Ediacaran rocks of the Khatyspyt Formation of Northern Siberia, discovered in 2008. Although the specimen that Grazhdankin et al. described was recognised as belonging to the Annulatubus genus, not enough material exists to recognise it as A. flexuosus or a new species.

== See also ==
- List of Ediacaran genera
- Blueflower Formation
