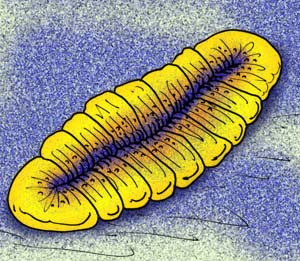
- Artist's reconstruction

Scientific classification
- Kingdom: Animalia
- Phylum: †Proarticulata
- Class: †Dipleurozoa
- Family: †Dickinsoniidae
- Genus: †Windermeria
- Species: †W. aitkeni

Binomial name
- †Windermeria aitkeni Narbonne, 1994

= Windermeria =

Windermeria Temporal range: late Ediacaran ~567–566 Ma

Extinct species of aquatic animal

Windermeria aitkeni (named after Windermere, British Columbia, Canada) is a Precambrian organism from the Blueflower Formation of Sekwi Brook North, in the Northwest Territories of Canada. Only one specimen has been found. Windermeria is a small (16.4 × 7.9 mm) segmented elongated oval fossil with eight nearly equal-sized segments arranged transverse to medial furrow in opposite arrangement. Windermeria superficially resembles a diminutive Dickinsonia and as such is the only possible dickinsoniid proarticulatan known exclusively from outside of Australia and East Europe.

== See also ==
- List of Ediacaran genera
