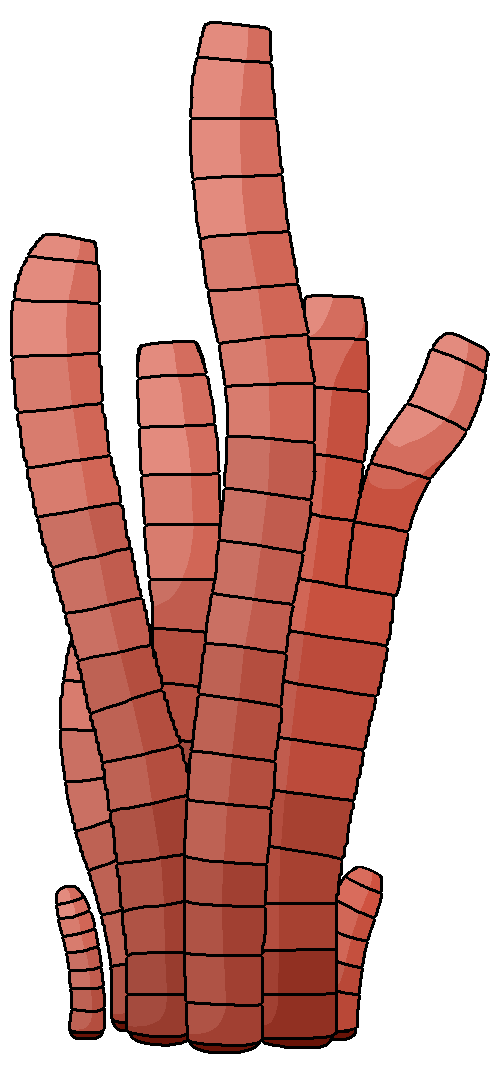
- Reconstruction of Funisia dorothea, incl. 'damaged' specimen.

Scientific classification
- Kingdom: Animalia
- Phylum: Porifera (?)
- Family: †Olgunidae
- Genus: †Funisia; Droser & Gehling, 2008
- Species: †F. dorothea

Binomial name
- †Funisia dorothea Droser & Gehling, 2008

= Funisia =

Funisia Temporal range: late Ediacaran ~567–555 Ma

Genus of animal discovered as an Australian fossil

Funisia is a genus of extinct, colonial sponge-like organisms from the late Ediacaran of South Australia and Canada. It is the most common genus within the fossils beds it is known from, and may have partially driven the paleoenvironment and paleoecology of the areas in which it was found by stopping other organisms from taking hold, or providing nutrients upon a mass death. It is a monotypic genus, containing only Funisia dorothea.

== Discovery and naming ==
Funisia specimens, as illustrated in the original article.

The fossil material of Funisia was found in the Ediacara Member of the Rawnsley Quartzite, Nilpena Ediacara National Park, South Australia in 2007, and formally described and named in 2008.

The generic name Funisia derives directly after the Latin word "rope". The specific name dorothea is in honour of Dorothy Droser, the mother of Mary L. Droser, one of the scientists who studied the organism.

== Description ==
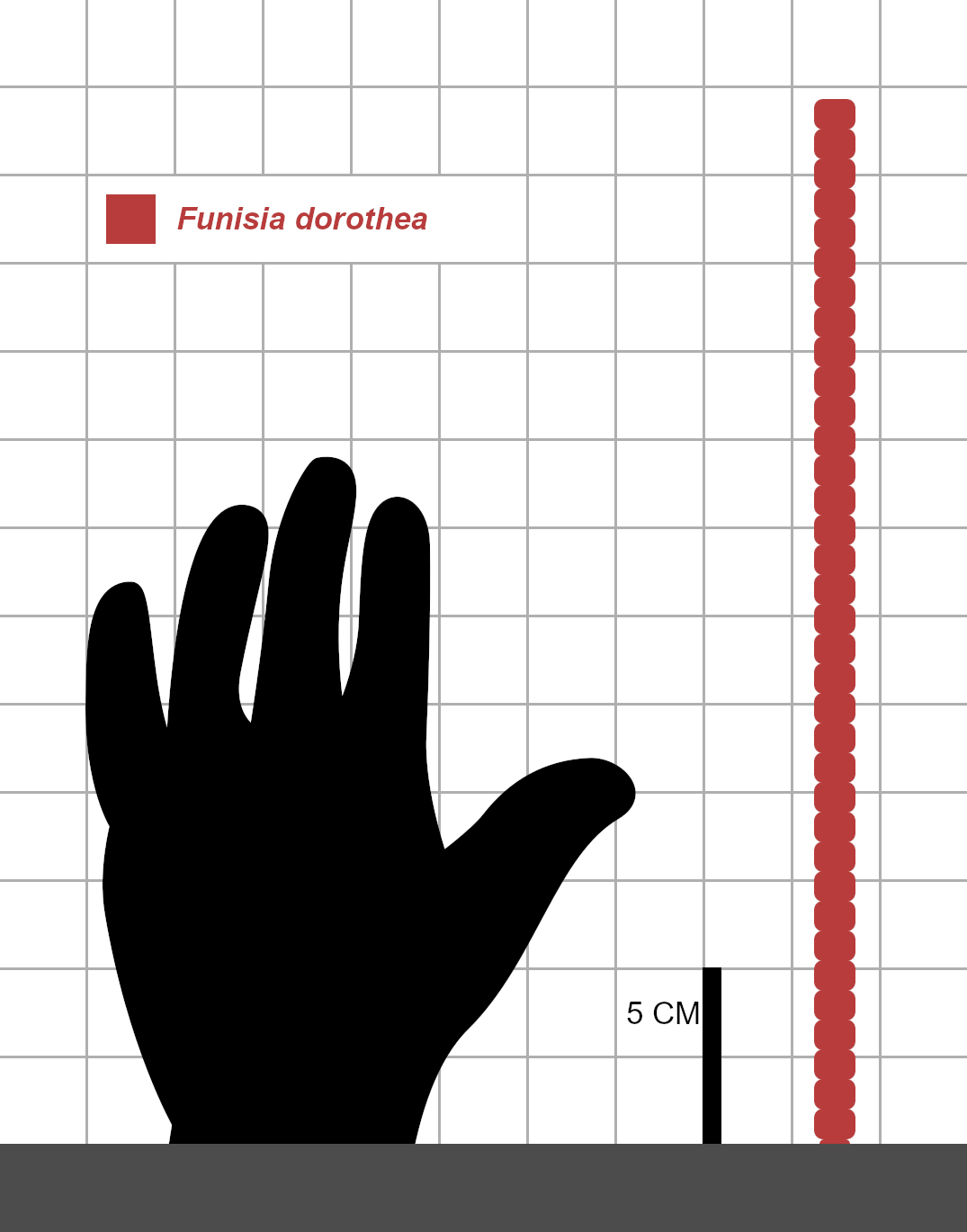
Size chart of Funisia.

Funisia was a nonmotile, hollow, fluid-filled organism resemblling an upright worm that stood about 0.3 m (11.8 in) tall, with a diameter of 12 mm (0.5 in). The body is segmented, consisting of units up to 8 mm (0.3 in) in length, and are defined by transverse constrictions in the body. There are also holdfast structures always preserved near body specimens, although never attached to any specimens of Funisia, growing up to 8 mm (0.3 in) in width, and may have been placed beneath a microbial mat. They are also found commonly in large clusters, usually numbering between 5 and 15 individuals of similar sizes, and are usually found laying on top of each other, showing that they did not fall in the direction of the water current, but most likely during storm activity. Because individuals grew in these dense collections of animals the same age, it is believed to have reproduced sexually, as well as reproduced by budding like modern sponges and corals. Although the evolution of sex took place before the origin of animals, and evidence of sexual reproduction is observed in red algae 1,200 million years ago, Funisia is one of the oldest known animals for which there is evidence of sexual reproduction.

When described, a branching specimen was noted, suggesting that Funisia may have had dichotomous branching, although a recent study has noted that this is only know from a single specimen out of over 1,000 specimens, and may have been the result of nonlethal damage, and recovering from said damage before burial.

This same study also looked at the growth model of Funisia, noting 3 stages:

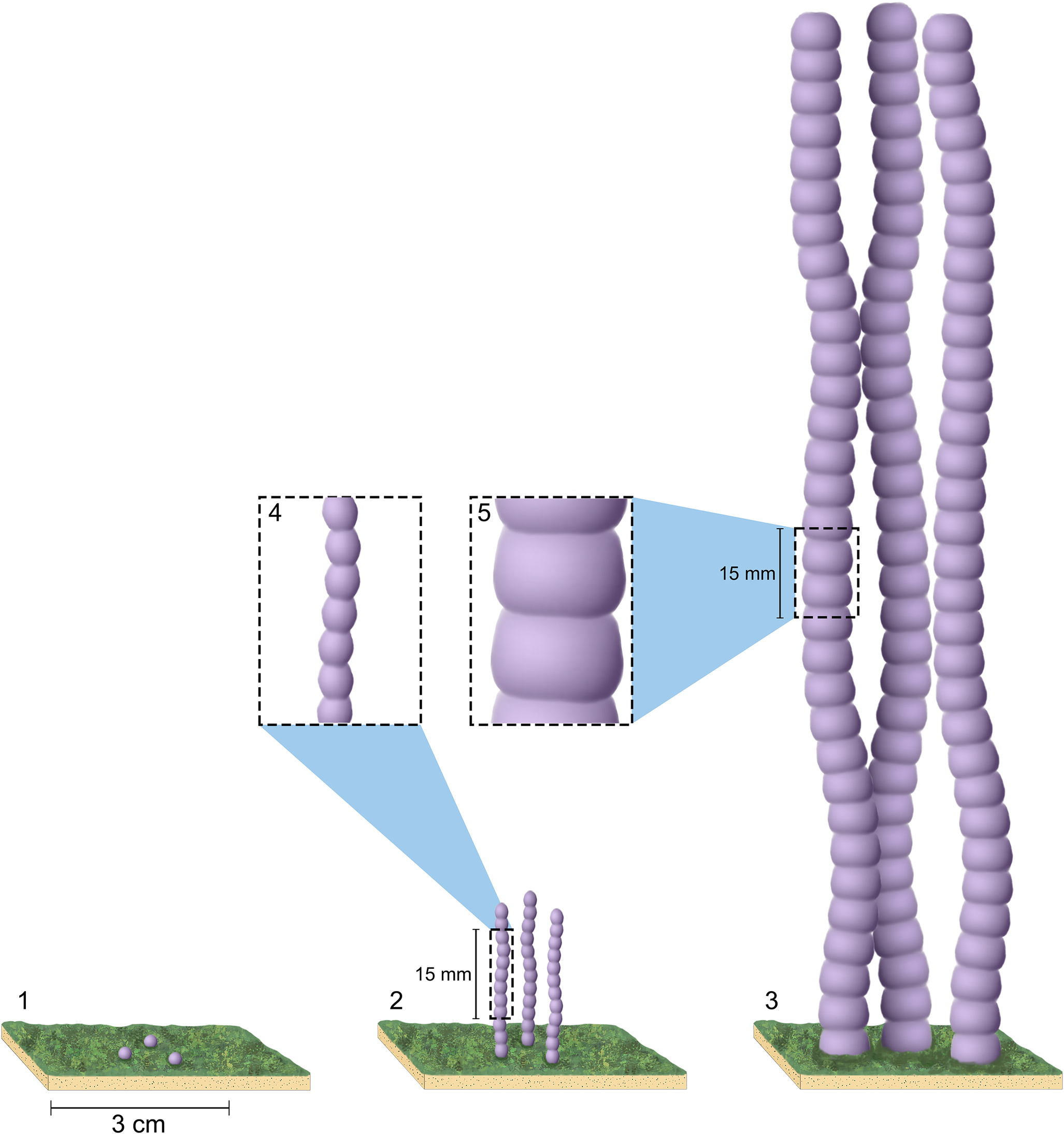
The three growth stages of Funisia dorothea.

- Stage 1: Establishment of individuals

The study notes that material of the first stage is non-existent, primarily due to the fact it would be hard to distinguish this stage from a microbial mat texture, and is a hypothetical stage. But, this stage is the settlement of Funisia as small spheres on top of the microbial mat.

- Stage 2: Insertion-dominated growth

This next stage sees the insertion of modular elements, like the segments, into the body with no inflational growth. This is mostly inferred by the smallest specimens of Funisia having notably long segments, giving a long and narrow morphology. This suggests that for a period of time, insertional growth was favoured over inflational growth, which fits with the suspension feeder interpretation, as the nutrients that Funisia would require would be further above the microbial mat.

- Stage 3: Combined insertional and inflational growth

This final growth stage of Funisia would see the inflational growth, the widening of the segments, become consistent with the insertional growth. The inflational growth would only increase in rate with the insertion of a new segment, before equalising to the pre-existing inflational growth of the other prior segments to maintain the form of Funisia.

== Taphonomy ==
Due to the hollow nature of Funisia, it has been found in four modes of preservation. The first, and most common, mode sees the fluid-filled interior empty out completely and deflating of the body, preserving the segments in fine detail, and leaving behind a very sharp margin. The second mode still sees the interior empty out, but uncompressed, causing the segments to rarely preserve, with a varying sharpness of the margin. The third mode sees the interior being filled in, but not to an extent that allows the segments to be preserved at all, and the margin of the specimens are simple parallel lines. The fourth and final mode sees only the trace of Funisia preserved poorly due to a loss of an internal mold, with tapered terminations, and is most commonly found alongside the second and third modes of preservation. It is noted that one specimen can have multiple modes of preservation at once.

The holdfasts of Funisia are preserved as positive hypo-relief, although are rarely preserved as it may be required to have Funisia either be severed or completely removed, allowing the holdfast under the microbial mat to be filled in.

== Ecology ==
Due to its modes of preservation, the ecology of Funisia had a single lifestyle, being characterised by dense clusters of many individuals over a large area, further supported by the preservation of densely packed holdfasts. This would have helped to stabilise the sediments and influence the preservation of other organisms. Alongside this, due to their great numbers, Funisia would have greatly sequestrated nutrients and resources from the water, stopping or slowing colonisation of the area from other organisms, even in areas where they are lower in number.

It is noted that on one bed, a mass of preserved Funisia have motile forms preserved on top, suggesting that this bed shows a whole population of deceased Funisia, now unburied and providing nutrients to other organisms, like Dickinsonia, now living on top of them, facilitating colonisation of the area from other organisms instead.

== Affinities ==
Its relationship to other animals is unknown, but it may belong within the Porifera (sponges), Cnidaria, a basal metazoan similar to sponges or an early varisarcan vendobiont. A recent paper has tentatively supported the placement of Funisia within Porifera, and also placed it within the newly erected family, Olgunidae, alongside Vaveliksia and Olgunia, which bare notable similarities with each other from being colonial, having tubular or sac-like bodies rising above the surface of the seafloor, and small attachment disks.

== Distribution ==
Funisia is predominately known from the Rawnsley Quartzite in Southern Australia, although a study published in 2026 has found specimens of Funisia from the lower layers of the Blueflower Formation in the Northwest Territories of Canada, showing that it had a wider distribution outside of Australia, and appeared much earlier than thought.

== See also ==
- List of Ediacaran genera
