= Palaeoplatoda =

Palaeoplatoda Temporal range: late Ediacaran ~558–555 Ma

Scientific classification
- Kingdom: Animalia
- Phylum: †Petalonamae
- Class: †Erniettomorpha
- Genus: †Palaeoplatoda; Fedonkin in Palij et al., 1979
- Species: †P. segmentata

Binomial name
- †Palaeoplatoda segmentata Fedonkin in Palij et al., 1979

Extinct leaf-like organism from the Ediacaran

Palaeoplatoda is an extinct genus from the late Ediacaran of Russia, and was alive around 558 – 555 Ma. Noted to have a leaf-like body, it was originally placed alongside Dickinsonia in the phylum Platyhelminthes, and later the class Dipleurozoa, although more recent studies have placed it within the class Erniettomorpha. It is a monotypic genus, containing only Palaeoplatoda segmentata.

== Discovery ==
Nine or twelve fossils of Palaeoplatoda were found along the Syuzma river in the Ust' Pinega Formation, on the Onega Peninsula of Russia, and was formally named and described in 1979.

Other specimens had been reported from the Bhima Basin in India, although they would become regarded as tentative after taxonomic and taphonomic studies had been undertaken in the same region, and then entirely discounted, noted to instead be specimens of the tubular genus Corumbella.

== Description ==
Palaeoplatoda segmentata is a flat, leaf-like organism, composed of thin, gently curving modules converging onto a zig-zagged median line, whilst the margins of the fossils are notably undulating in nature, although this has been inferred to likely be the result of deformation and the organism being tender, or soft, in life. The largest fossil is known to get up to 70 mm (3 in) in length and 30 mm (1 in) in width, whilst each module only reaches up to 0.6 mm (0 in) in width, and the median line reaches a width of 2 mm (0 in).

== Affinities ==
When it was first described in 1979 by Fedonkin, Palaeoplatoda was noted to bear similarities to another Ediacaran fossil, Dickinsonia, and namely Dickinsonia elongata, to the overall shape of the body and appearance of the modules, although Palaeoplatoda differed in having a narrower median line, and a finer curve to the modules. It was also noted, alongside Dickinsonia that it also bore similarities to members of the class Turbellaria, predominately the Polycladida and Tricladida, sharing similar morphologies and sizes, although it was noted that the segmentation is more akin to "polymeric annelids". As such, Palaeoplatoda was considered as a potential transitional form between flatforms and annelid worms, seeing it placed into the phylum Platyhelminthes. Later, in 1985, Fedonkin would reassign Palaeoplatoda to the class Dipleurozoa, under the family Dickinsoniidae, alongside Dickinsonia.

In 2011, Erwin et al. would undertake a large analysis of the classifications of fossil organisms from the Ediacaran, which included Palaeoplatoda. They would see it placed under the class Erniettomorpha, alongside other erniettomorphs such as Ernietta and Phyllozoon. This would be supported in future studies including Palaeoplatoda.

== See also ==
- List of Ediacaran genera
