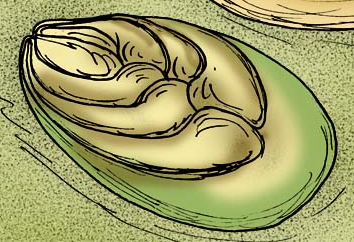
- Artists restoration of Paravendia janae.

Scientific classification
- Kingdom: Animalia
- Phylum: †Proarticulata
- Class: †Vendiamorpha
- Family: †Vendiidae
- Genus: †Paravendia; Ivantsov, 2004
- Species: †P. janae

Binomial name
- †Paravendia janae Ivantsov, 2001

= Paravendia =

Paravendia Temporal range: late Ediacaran ~553 Ma

Genus of proarticulate

Paravendia is an extinct genus of proarticulate from the late Ediacaran of Russia, around 553 Ma. It is a monotypic genus, containing only Paravendia janae.

== Discovery ==
Fossil material of Paravendia was found in the Zimnegorsk locality in the Mezen Formation, White Sea, Arkhangelsk Region, Russia in 2001 and originally assigned to the genus Vendia as V. janae. It was then re-described in 2004, due to its differing appearance and new material.

== Etymology ==
The generic name Paravendia directly derives from the Greek word "para", to mean "near"; and the genus name it was previously under, "Vendia". The specific name janae is in honour of Jana E. Malakhovskaya.

== Description ==
Paravendia janae is an elongated ovoid proarticulate, getting up to 36 mm (1.4 in) in length and 18 mm (0.7 in) in width. It features the classic glide symmetry seen in proarticulates, and has four isomers on either side of the medial line, which have a maximum inclination of 30 degrees along this line. Each set of isomers also notably cover the previous set of isomers completely, converging on a single point at the rear of the organism. It is also noted that the front set of isomers are larger than the rest, forming not only the marginal rim of the organism, but are also not segmented from each other.

== Distribution ==
Paravendia is primarily known from the Kimberella Lens and Yorgia Bed accumulations, which themselves are found within the Zimnegorsk locality of the Mezen Formation.

== See also ==
- List of ediacaran genera

== Notes ==
- Zakrevskaya, Maria. Paleoecological reconstruction of the Ediacaran benthic macroscopic communities of the White Sea (Russia). Palaeogeography, Palaeoclimatology, Palaeoecology 15 September 2014.
- Freeman, Gary. The rise of bilaterians. Historical Biology 2009 03.
