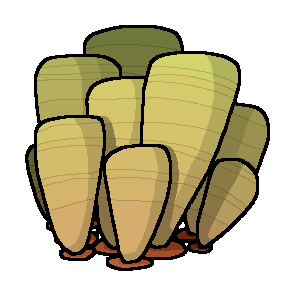
- Reconstruction of Olgunia bondarenkoae

Scientific classification
- Kingdom: Animalia
- Phylum: Porifera (?)
- Family: †Olgunidae
- Genus: †Olgunia; Luzhnaya, 2025
- Species: †O. bondarenkoae

Binomial name
- †Olgunia bondarenkoae Luzhnaya, 2025

= Olgunia =

Olgunia Temporal range: late Ediacaran ~550 Ma

Species of colonial Ediacaran organism

Olgunia is an extinct genus of colonial, sponge-like organisms from the late Ediacaran of the Russia, and is the namesake of the family Olgunidae. It is a monotypic genus, containing only Olgunia bondarenkoae.

== Discovery and name ==
The holotype material, and accompanying material, of Olgunia was found in the Erga Beds of the Mezen Formation, Arkhangelsk Oblast, Russia, and formally described and named in 2025.

The generic name Olgunia, and specific name bondarenkoae are derived from the Latinised forename and surname of Olga Borisovna Bondarenko, who is an associate professor at the Department of Paleontology at Lomonosov Moscow State University, known researcher on Paleozoic heliolitid corals, and also a teacher to the author that described the fossil material.

== Description ==
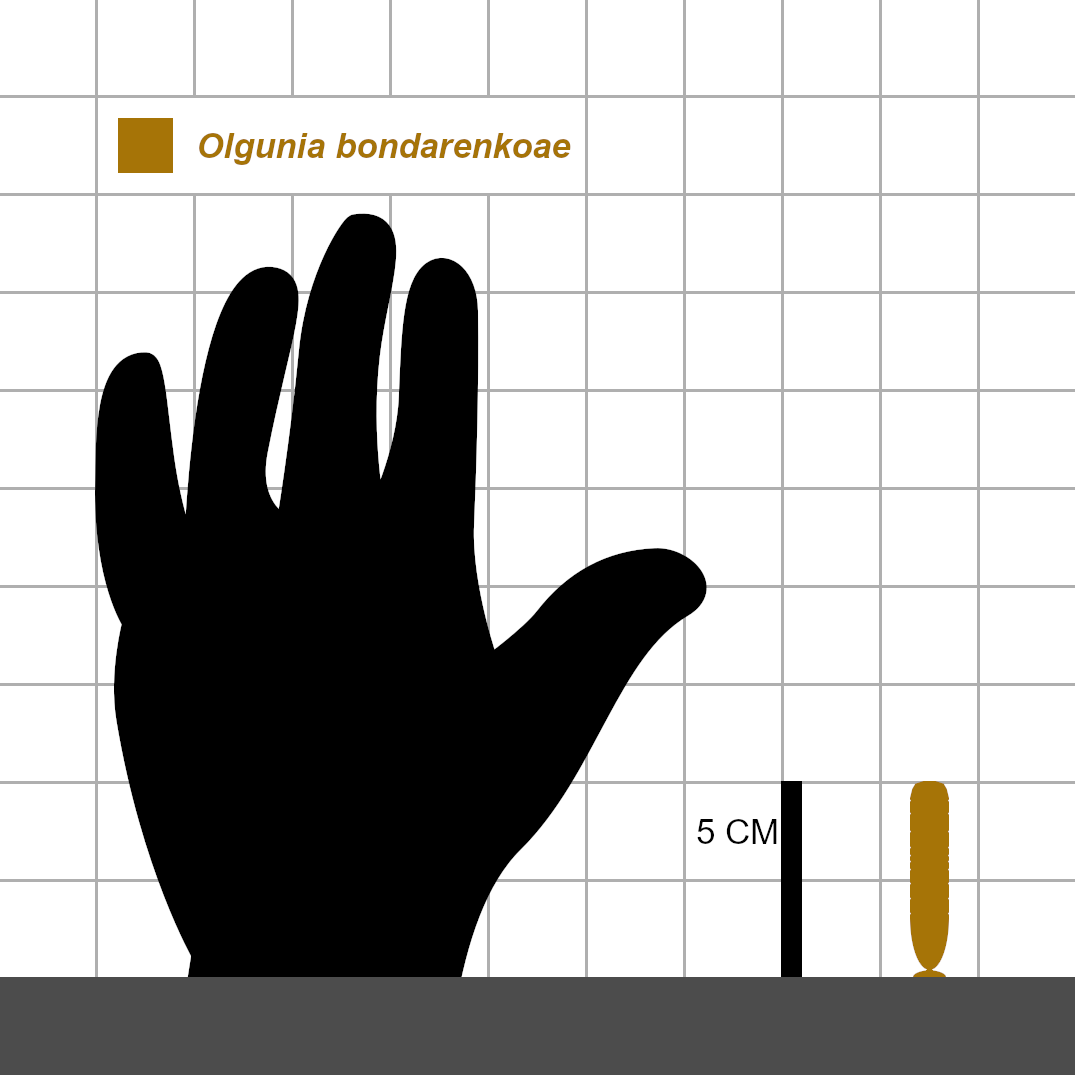
Size chart of Olgunia bondarenkoae.

Olgunia bondarenkoae consists of a grouping of oval, saccular bodies, which grow up to a maximum length of 50 mm (2.0 in), and a width of 10 mm (0.4 in). These are suggested to have stood up above the surface, and were attached to the substrate via small attachment disks, similar to Funisia and Vaveliksia, which are recorded to get up to 7 mm (0.3 in) in diameter, with some noted to have tubercles in their center. The saccular bodies are noted to have irregular transverse partitions, ranging from intervals of 1–5 mm (0.0–0.2 in), with noted zonal 'grouping' of some of the partitions, which has been suggested to be a response to a change in the local environment, something observed in tabulate corals.

Whilst it is noted to be similar to other members of the family Olgunidae, it still has many noted distinctive differences. Compared to Vaveliksia, there are a greater number of less regularly arranged partitions, alongside dichotomous branching of the saccular bodies and a colonial lifestyle. Compared to Funisia, the bodies are more sac-like in nature instead of stick-like, and the differing concentric nature of either organism.

== Taphonomy ==
The fossils of Olgunia are preserved within greenish-grey to reddish medium-grained sandstones, which are convex in shape with high and low relief, and the central parts of the fossils are slightly raised, forming a hummock shape. It is suggested that they were buried due to mounds of sand settling around the sac-like bodies, and later gained their depressed shape when they inverted due to the uneven compaction of the sand and surrounding silts, causing the organic material to sink, with the convexity downwards, during fossilisation.

The fossil material itself appear regularly in a fan-like shape, with small rounded circular forms in the centre that are encircled by suboval bodies radiating outwards. From this, it is suggested that the circular forms represent the holdfast disks of the sac-like bodies, which most likely stood erect from the surface of the substrate. This is further supported by the bodies overlapping each other, and due to the higher number of disks to bodies, the marginal bodies were the only ones preserved, whilst the more central ones decomposed, again further hinted at some of the central disks still preserving tubercles. The bodies were also three dimensional in shape, due to the ability of being able to separate some of the bodies from the matrix, and bear similarities to Funisia, which are regarded as three dimensional hollow tubes.

== See also ==
- List of Ediacaran genera
