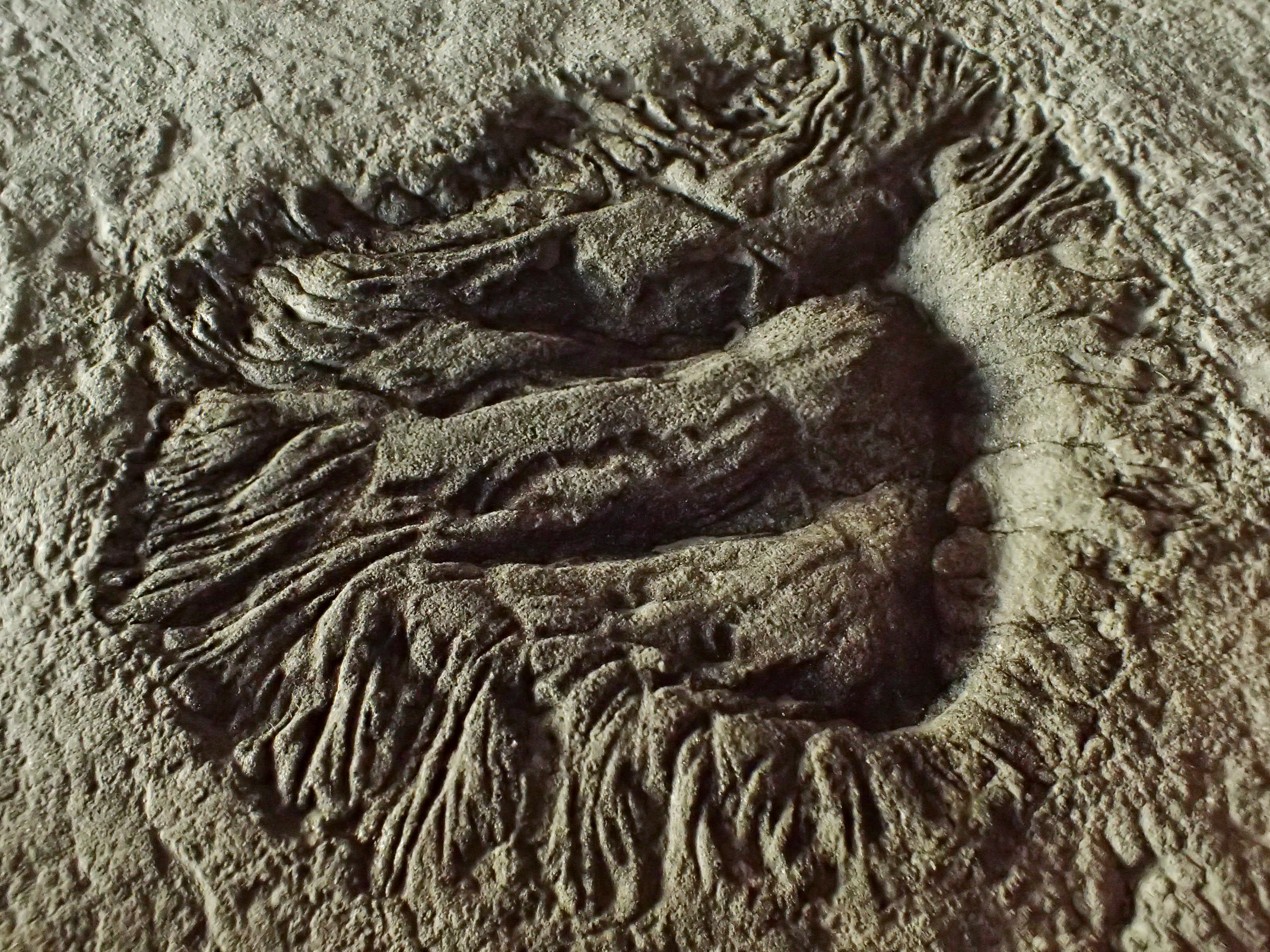
- Fossil of Karakhtia nessovi
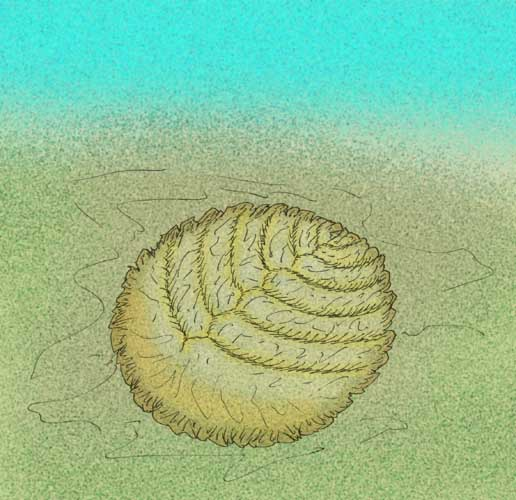
- Reconstruction of Karakhtia nessovi

Scientific classification
- Kingdom: Animalia
- Phylum: †Proarticulata
- Class: †Vendiamorpha
- Family: †Vendiidae
- Genus: †Karakhtia; Ivantsov, 2004
- Species: †K. nessovi

Binomial name
- †Karakhtia nessovi Ivantsov, 2004

= Karakhtia =

Karakhtia Temporal range: late Ediacaran ~555 Ma

Wrinkled proarticulate from 555 ma

Karakhtia nessovi is a species of proarticulate from the Ediacaran period, around 555 Million Years Ago. K. nessovi is the only species in the genus Karakhtia. The genus Haootia has been compared minorly to Karakhtia in the way that the fossils of Haootia superficially resemble the crumpled margins of Karakhtia.

== Discovery and name ==
The holotype fossil of Karakhtia was found from the Ustʹ Pinega Formation, in the White Sea of Russia, and described in 2004.

The generic name Karakhtia is derived from the place name Karakhta River, near to where the fossil material was found. The specific name nessovi is derived from the surname of L.A. Nessov, a Leningrad paleontologist.

== Description ==
Karakhtia nessovi is a proarticulate from the Vendiidae family, growing up to 100 mm (3.9 in) in length, and like other members of its family, it has a headshield-like structure. Unlike anything seen in other proarticulates, it features a margin with radial folds, giving it a frilly appearance.

== See also ==
- Vendiamorpha
- Vendia
- List of Ediacaran genera
