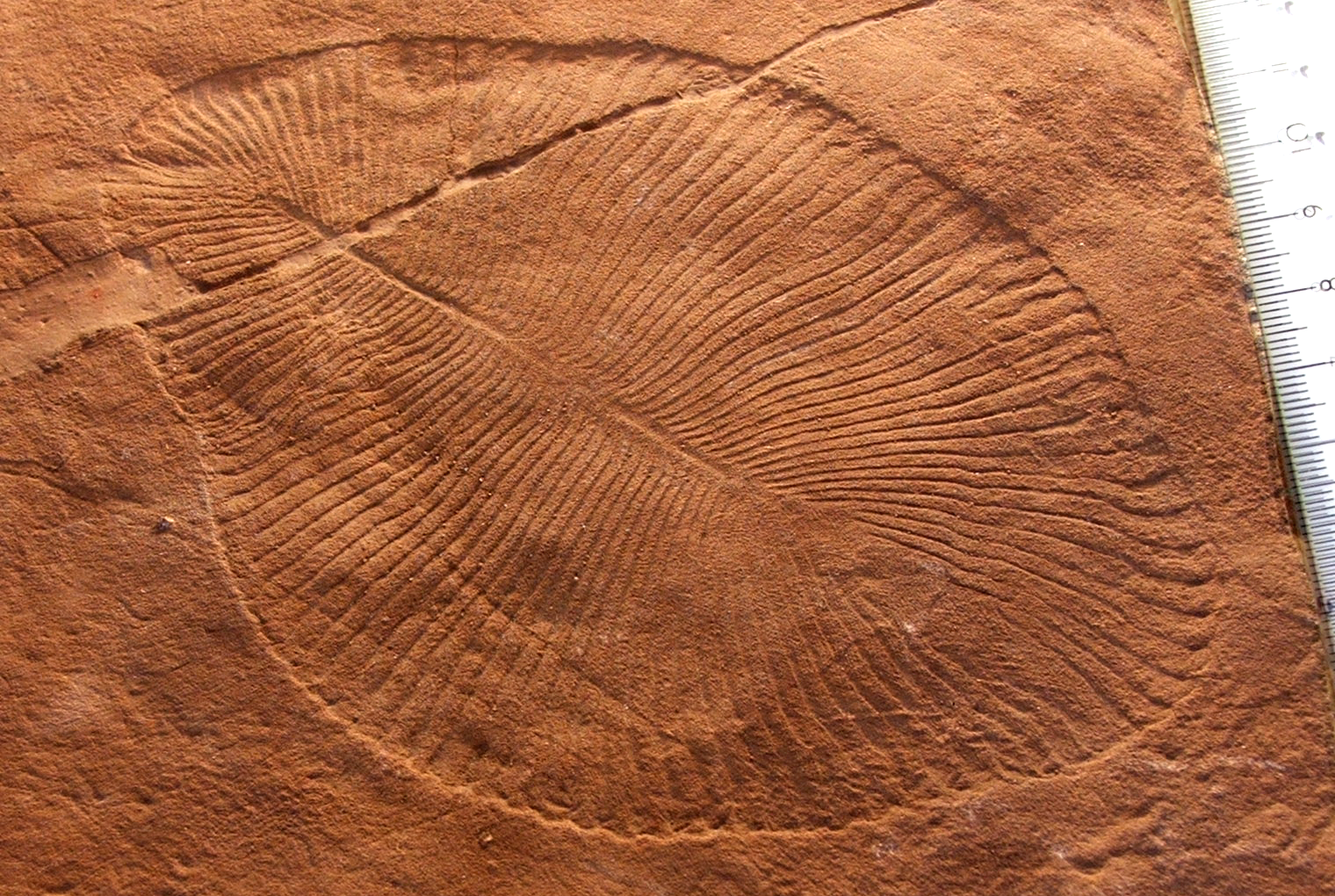
- Dickinsonia costata

Scientific classification
- Kingdom: Animalia
- Phylum: †Proarticulata
- Class: †Dipleurozoa
- Family: †Dickinsoniidae; Harrington & Moore, 1955

Genera
- Dickinsonia; ?Windermeria; Palaeoplatoda

= Dickinsoniidae =

Dickinsoniidae Temporal range: Ediacaran, 555–550 Ma

Fossil taxon

Dickinsoniidae is a taxon of Ediacaran fossils with an airbed-like quilted morphology, sometimes found in association with bizarre trace fossils. It is placed within the extinct phylum Proarticulata, and contains the defined genera Dickinsonia and probably Windermeria. Phyllozoon is associated with this family, and is thought to represent ichnofossils of Dickinsonia.
