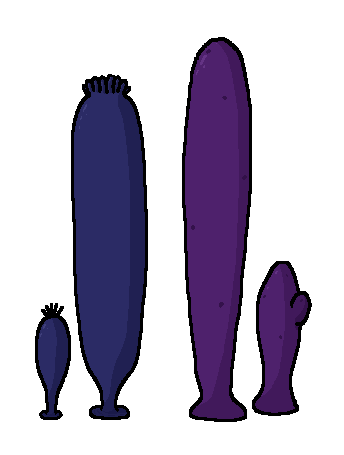
- Artist's reconstruction of V. velikanovi and V. vana.

Scientific classification
- Kingdom: Animalia
- Phylum: Porifera (?)
- Family: †Olgunidae
- Genus: †Vaveliksia; Fedonkin, 1983

Species
- †V. velikanovi Fedonkin, 1983 (Type); †V. svetozarovae Gureev, 1988; †V. vana Serezhnikova, 2004

= Vaveliksia =

Vaveliksia Temporal range: Ediacaran 580–550 Ma

Genus of sponges (fossil)

Vaveliksia is an extinct genus of Ediacaran Sponge-like organism with a long, tubular-shaped body from the formations within Northwestern Russia, Ukraine, and possibly Australia.

== Discovery and naming ==
Vaveliksia velikanovi fossils were found in the Lomozov Beds of the Mogilev Formation in the Dniester River Basin, and in Bernashevka Beds, Yarishev Formation, in the quarry near Ozaryntsi Village, Podolia, Ukraine, and formally described in 1983. V. svetozarovae fossils were found also from the Mogilev Formation in Ukraine, and were formally described in 1988. V. vana fossils are known from the Yorga Formation on the Zimnii Bereg (Winter Coast) of the White Sea, Arkhangelsk Region, Russia, and formally described in 2004.

There is single reference to V. vana from the Ediacaran deposites in the South Australia, but photographs or description of these fossils were not presented.

The generic epithet Vaveliksia and specific epithet of the type species V. velikanovi honour the Ukrainian geologist, Vyacheslav A. Velikanov. The specific epithet of V. vana derives directly from the Latin word vana, to mean "incorporeal".

== Description ==
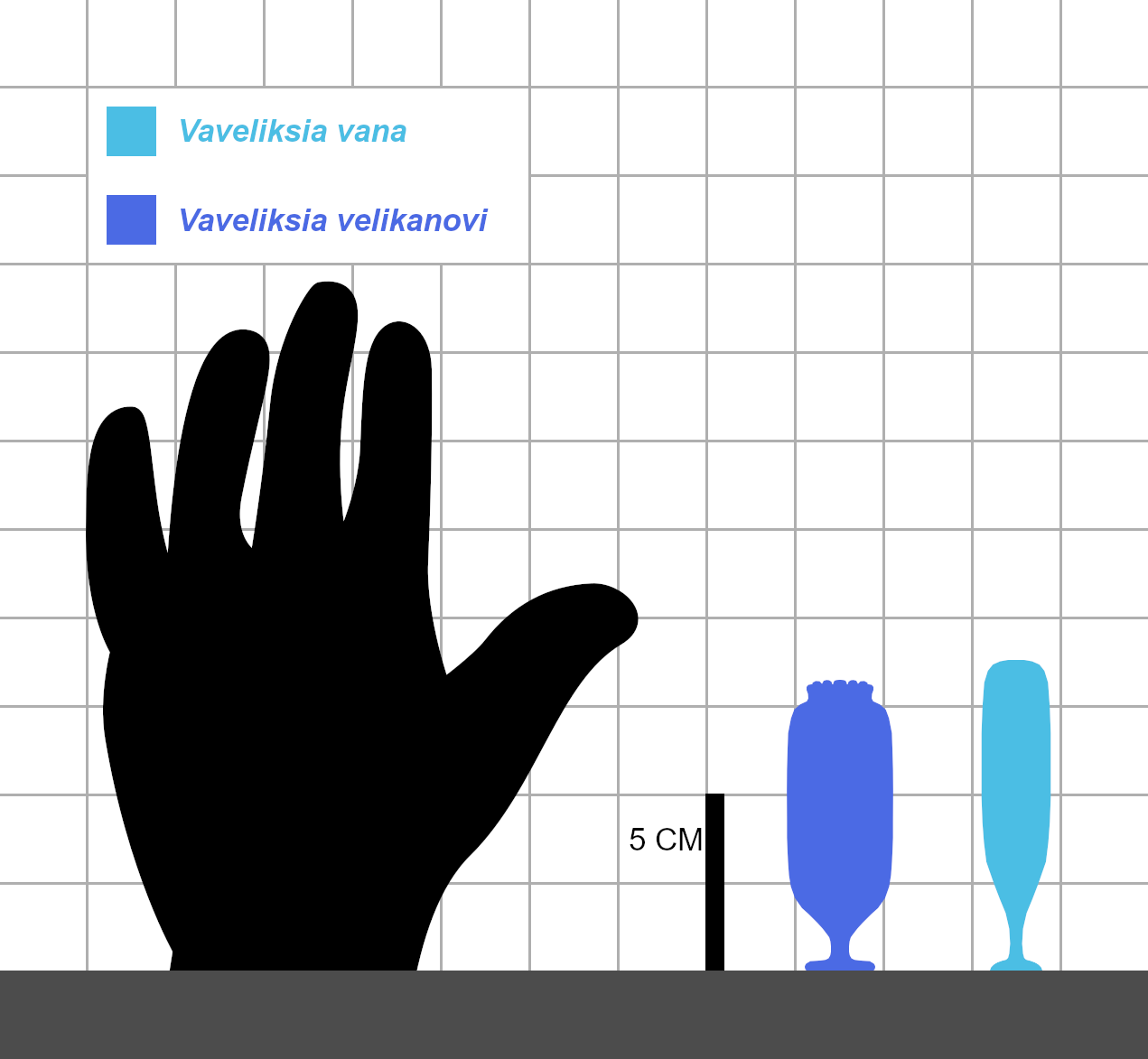
Size chart of both V. vana and V. velikanovi.

The typical Vaveliksia had a frankfurter-like appearance, with one end attached to the substrate by a disk-like holdfast. The body wall was very thin, and perforated. At the top was a hole, which may be an osculum, if they were indeed true sponges. In V. velikanovi, found only in Precambrian strata of the Dneister, the top has a crown of wrinkles which was originally interpreted as tentacles (the first fossils were originally thought to be of a polyp-like organism), and the holdfast is relatively flat and disk-like. V. vana, found at the White Sea shores and in Australia, is thinner in diameter, has an unwrinkled top, and the holdfast is much more convex or dome-like. Some specimens of V. vana also had arms.

V. velikanovi fossils range 3–8 cm (1.2–3.1 in) in length and up to 3 cm in width. The attachment disks range 0.8–2 cm (0.3–0.8 in) in diameter.

V. vana range 3.5–8.6 cm (1.4–3.4 in) in length and up to 2 cm (0.8 in) in width. The attachment disks range 0.7–1.5 cm (0.3–0.6 in) in diameter.

No measurement is known for V. svetozarovae, although is noted to be shorter and rounder than V. velikanovi, with its width almost matching its length.

== Affinities ==
A recent paper has tentatively supported the placement of Vaveliksia within Porifera, and also placed it within the newly erected family, Olgunidae, alongside Funisia and Olgunia, which bare notable similarities with each other from being colonial, having tubular or sac-like bodies rising above the surface of the seafloor, and small attachment disks.

== See also ==
- List of Ediacaran genera
