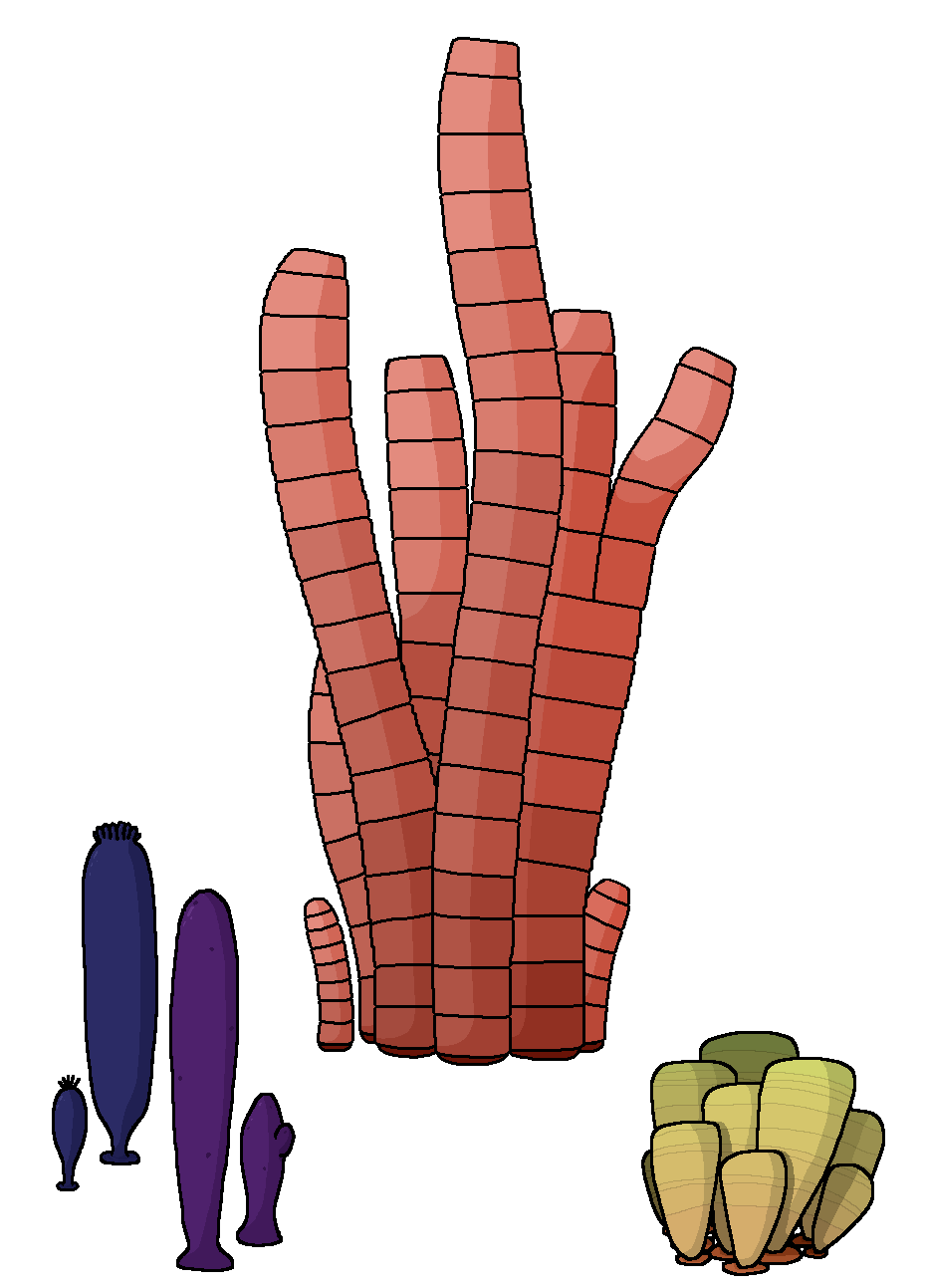
- All the current olgunids, incl. Vaveliksia, Funisia and Olgunia.

Scientific classification
- Kingdom: Animalia
- Phylum: Porifera (?)
- Family: †Olgunidae; Luzhnaya, 2025

Genera
- † Olgunia; † Funisia; † Vaveliksia

= Olgunidae =

Olgunidae Temporal range: late Ediacaran ~567–550 Ma

Extinct family of tubular shaped organisms

Olgunidae is an extinct family from the Ediacaran, with possible relations to the phylum Porifera. They were predominately sac-like in shape and colonial in nature, and lived from around 567 to 551 million years ago, with the type species being Olgunia.

== Description ==
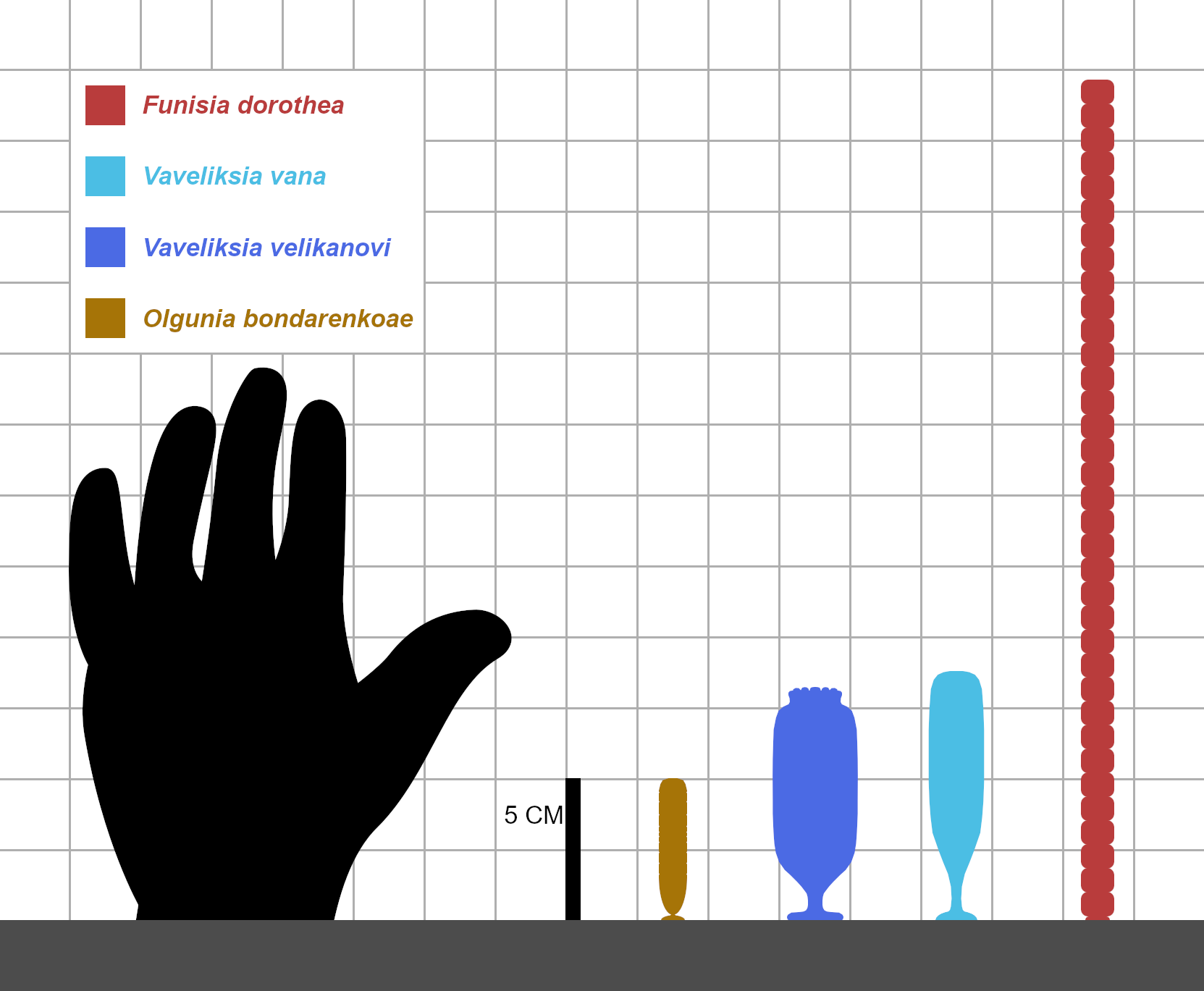
Size chart of all the olgunids.

Olgunids have tubular to sac-like bodies, with sizes ranging from 5 cm (2.0 in) to 30 cm (11.8 in) in height, which are made up of segments/partitions with regular to irregular spacing and sizes, and stand tall from the seafloor, with some genera having dichotomous branching, although a recent study done on one of the olgunid members, Funisia, has noted that branching is only observed in a single specimen, and may have been the result of nonlethal damage, and recovering from said damage. They also all bear small disks at their bases, allowing them to attach to the surface of the substrate. They are also noted be colonial in nature, being found in small to large groups, although specimens of one of the members, Vaveliksia, is more commonly found solitary. Funisia is noted to also show signs of sexual reproduction, making it the oldest known example.

It has been noted that olgunids have similar body-plans to sponges, but also to coelenterates, a rejected phylum that included comb jellies and cnidarians.

== Distribution ==
Genera of the family Olgunidae can be found predominately in the Northern Hemisphere and occasionally in the Southern Hemisphere, with examples found within the Yorga and Mezen Formations in Russia, the Mogilev and Yaryshev Formations in Ukraine, the 555 Ma Rawnsley Quartzite in South Australia,, as well as the 567 Ma Blueflower Formation in Canada.

== Taxonomy ==
Olgunidae includes the following genera and species:

- † Olgunia Luzhnaya, 2025 (Type species)
  - † Olgunia bondarenkoae Luzhnaya, 2025
- † Funisia Droser & Gehling, 2008
  - † Funisia dorothea Droser & Gehling, 2008
- † Vaveliksia Fedonkin, 1983
  - † Vaveliksia velikanovi Fedonkin, 1983
  - † Vaveliksia svetozarovae Gureev, 1988
  - † Vaveliksia vana Serezhnikova, 2004

Vaveliksia was formerly considered as a strange petalonamid organism by Fedonkin as it showed a disc like structure at the base. Funisia was provisionally included in the oldest animal phylum Vendobionta by Cavalier-Smith. But due to the taxon having no proper definition it was never formally erected.

== See also ==
- List of Ediacaran genera
