= Risky Formation =

Geologic formation in the Yukon and the Northwest Territories, Canada

- Stratigraphic range: late Ediacaran 566.9 Ma
- Type: Formation
- Unit of: Rackla Group
- Underlies: (Unconformably) Ingta Formation
- Overlies: Blueflower Formation
- Thickness: 114–167 m (374–548 ft)

Lithology
- Primary: Carbonate rock

Location
- Region: Yukon and Northwest Territories
- Country: Canada

Type section
- Named for: Risky Peak
- Named by: Aitken
- Year defined: 1989

The Risky Formation is a geologic formation in Yukon and the Northwest Territories, and is a part of the Rackla Group. It preserves a sparse record of fossils dating back to the Ediacaran period.

== History of research ==
The rocks of the Risky Formation were first noted by Blusson, 1971 as "Map unit 11", being noted to form buff-coloured cliffs underlying a thick quartzite sequence, and consisting of thick-bedded, buff-weathering dolomite, although they did not interpret or map its presence at June Lake, although in 1974 Blusson would extend it into Niddery Lake. Later, another study done by Fritz, 1980 would see strata found near June Lake to be correlated to "Map unit 11", although in 1982, Fritz would see the a large part of "Map unit 11" equated to the middle member of the Backbone Ranges Formation. It would be until 1989 when "Map unit 11" would be properly studied and given a formal name, which would be the "Risky Formation", with doubt put into the prior correlation of some strata being correlated to the Backbone Ranges Formation.

== Geology ==
The Risky Formation can be found outcropping at Sekwi Brook and June Lake within the Mackenzie Mountains in Canada, and is a part of the wider Rackla Group, sitting at the very top. It is predominately composed of various pale-orange weathering dolomites and sandstones, and ranges between 114–167 m (374–548 ft) in thickness. At the Sekwi Brook locality, the formation is composed of coarse-grained quartz sand, with a slightly recessive weathering "break" in the form of grey shales. Meanwhile, at the June Lake locality, the formation is composed of fine to very fine-grained dark-grey calcareous sandstone, which ranges from medium to very thin-bedded in nature. Throughout these layers there can also be found tubular-cast breccias and conglomerates, which are inferred to be debris flows. The grey shales found in the Sekwi Brook locality are also found here. It can also be found outcropping in the Wernecke Mountains, where it is composed of orange to rose weathering dolostone, which is quartzose in nature.

It is abruptly and unconformably overlain by the shale and sandstone dominated Ingta Formation, meanwhile it is underlain by the shale and mudstone dominated Blueflower Formation.

== Depositional environment ==
The Risky Formation was deposited on a carbonate platform shelf in shallow waters, inferred from the locally developed ooid-sand shoals, stromatolite reef complexes, and occasional input from quartz sand.

== Paleobiota ==
Compared to the underlying formations, the Risky Formation has notably few fossils, with the only ones recorded being simple ichnogenera, such as the burrow Planolites.

Color key: Taxon / Reclassified taxon / Taxon falsely reported as present / Dubious taxon or junior synonym / Ichnotaxon / Ootaxon / Morphotaxon

Notes
Uncertain or tentative taxa are in small text
~~crossed out~~ taxa are discredited.

=== Ichnogenera ===
Genus	Species	Notes	Images
Planolites	Planolites sp.	Burrows.	
Gordia or Torrowangea	cf. Gordia or cf. Torrowangea sp.	Burrows, comparable to either Gordia or Torrowangea.	

== See also ==
- List of fossiliferous stratigraphic units in Yukon
- List of fossiliferous stratigraphic units in Northwest Territories
