= Blueflower Formation =

Geologic formation in the Northwest Territories, Canada

- Stratigraphic range: late Ediacaran; ~567.3–566.9 Ma
- Type: Formation
- Unit of: Rackla Group
- Sub-units: Lower and Upper Member
- Underlies: Risky Formation
- Overlies: (Unconformably) Gametrail Formation

Lithology
- Primary: Siliciclastic
- Other: Limestone, Mudstone, Siltstone, Sandstone

Location
- Region: Northwest Territories
- Country: Canada

Type section
- Named for: Blueflower Mountain
- Named by: Aitken
- Year defined: 1989

The Blueflower Formation is a geologic formation in the Northwest Territories, and is a part of the Rackla Group. It preserves fossils dating back to the Ediacaran period, in both shallow and deep-water environments.

== Geology ==
The Blueflower Formation can be found outcropping in the Wernecke Mountains in Canada, and is a part of the wider Rackla Group. It is overlain by the Risky Formation, whilst it is unconformably underlain by the dolostone Gametrail Formation. The formation is also unique in preserving both deep-water and shallow-water environments. The shallow-water sections are primarily composed of siliciclastic rocks, with sandy-carbonates throughout, and is also fossiliferous in nature, meanwhile the deep-water sections are split into three members.

=== Members ===
The deep-water sections of this formation are composed of three members, two of which are informally named, which are as follows in stratigraphic order (lowest to highest):

- Yuletide Member: This member is primarily composed of inter-bedded conglomerate, sandstone and siltstone.
- Disk Member: This member is dominated by black shales, which is inter-bedded with siltstone, sandstone, and authigenic carbonate lenses and nodules. This member is also fossiliferous in nature, containing a number of discoidal forms such as Aspidella, which give the member its informal name.
- Upper Member: This member is predominately composed of sandstones, containing coarse-grained trough- and tabular-cross-bedded rocks, all of which is inter-bedded with shales.

== Dating ==
The base of the Blueflower Formation has been dated using Re–Os Dating, whilst the upper layers have been dated based on the fossil material. Using samples from the base of the formation, the recovered dates were 567.3±3 Ma and 566.9±3.5 Ma, placing the lower layers within the Avalon assemblage. Meanwhile, various fossils collected from rocks higher up in the formation are noted to be akin to formations placed within the White Sea and Nama assemblages, with the tentative proarticulate Windermeria correlating these layers to the White Sea assemblage.

== Paleobiota ==
Unlike most other Ediacaran formations, the Blueflower Formation is unique in that is preserves shallow and deep-marine environments, and as it correlates with other Avalonian formations such as those in Newfoundland and Labrador, it allowed scientists to figure out whether the Ediacaran Biota started out in deep-marine environments before making their way into shallower waters. The forms that can be found across the formation are the familiar Petalonamae such as Charniodiscus, including juvenile petalonamids from the Lower Member, and from the Upper Member tubular forms such as Annulatubus, and the enigmatic Windermeria.

A recent paper also describes White Sea aged fossils within the lower sections of the formation, with the fossiliferous rocks being notably enriched in Carbon-13, an enrichment which has only been found in rocks dating to 567.3 million years ago and 566.9 million years ago, placing them within the Avalon assemblage and pushing their appearance some 7 million years before the White Sea assemblage begins, and includes organisms such as the olgunid Funisia and the proarticulate Dickinsonia. It is also the first example of White Sea assemblage organisms not only being found in a deep-water environment, but also the first example of several organisms being found within Laurentia.

Color key: Taxon / Reclassified taxon / Taxon falsely reported as present / Dubious taxon or junior synonym / Ichnotaxon / Ootaxon / Morphotaxon

Notes
Uncertain or tentative taxa are in small text
~~crossed out~~ taxa are discredited.

=== Bilaterian ===
Genus	Species	Environment	Notes	Images
Kimberella	K. quadrata	Deep-water	Mollusc-like organism, first record in Laurentia and outside of Australia.	

=== Porifera ===
Genus	Species	Environment	Notes	Images
Funisia	F. dorothea	Deep-water	Olgunid tubular organism, first record in Laurentia and outside of Australia.	

=== Petalonamae ===
Genus	Species	Environment	Notes	Images
Charniodiscus	Charniodiscus sp.		Frondose organism.	
Pteridinium	Pteridinium sp.		Frondose organism, originally reported as Inkrylovia.	
Swartpuntia (?)	Swartpuntia (?) sp.	Deep-water	Frondose organism.	
Juvenile Fronds	Arborea ?; Charniodiscus ?; Trepassia ?	Shallow-water	Juvenile frondose organisms, exact genus affinities unknown.	

=== Proarticulata ===
Genus	Species	Environment	Notes	Images
Windermeria	W. aitkeni	Shallow-water	Elongated motile organism.	
Dickinsonia	Dickinsonia sp.	Deep-water	Oval motile organism, with glided reflection. First record in Laurentia.	

=== Trilobozoan ===
Genus	Species	Environment	Notes	Images
Rugoconites (?)	Rugoconites (?) sp	Shallow-water	Tri-lobed organism, too poorly preserved for confident assignment.	

=== Cnidarian ===
Genus	Species	Environment	Notes	Images
Ediacaria	E. flindersi		Discoid organism.	
Kullingia	Kullingia sp.		Discoidal organism.	

=== incertae sedis ===
Genus	Species	Environment	Notes	Images
Annulatubus	A. flexuosus	Shallow-water	Tubular organism.	
Aspidella	A. terrinovica	Shallow and Deep-water	Discoid organism.	
Aulozoon	A. soliorum	Deep-water	Sessile, tubular organism, first record in Laurentia and outside of Australia.	
Cyclomedusa	Cyclomedusa sp.; C. davidi		Discoid organism.	
Eoandromeda	E. octobrachiata		Eight-armed radial organism, first record in Laurentia.	
Hiemalora	H. pleiomorphus		Discoid organism, possibly holdfasts of petalonamids.	
Medusinites	M. asteroides	Deep-water	Discoidal organism. Specimens described in Evans et al, 2026 notably bear stalk-like structures.	
Sekwia	S. excentria		Discoid organism.	
Sekwitubulus	S. annularis	Shallow and Deep-water	Tubular organism.	

=== Flora ===
Genus	Species	Environment	Notes	Images
Beltanelliformis	B. brunsae	Shallow-water	Cyanobacterial colony.	
Vendotaenia (?)	Vendotaenia (?) sp.	Shallow-water	Ribbon-like organism.	

=== Ichnogenera ===
Genus	Species	Environment	Notes	Images
Archaeonassa	Archaeonassa sp.		Burrows.	
Gordia	G. marina		Burrows.	
Helminthoidichnites	Helminthoidichnites sp.	Shallow and deep-water	Burrows.	
Helminthopsis	Helminthopsis sp.; H. abeli; H. irregularis	Shallow-water	Burrows.	
Kimberichnus	Kimberichnus sp.	Deep-water	Feeding traces of Kimberella.	
Planolites	P. monatanus	Shallow and deep-water	Burrows.	
Torrowangea	Torrowangea sp.		Burrows.	

=== Undescribed ===
Genus	Species	Environment	Notes	Images
problematicum	???	Deep-water	Ribbon-like fossils, affinities unknown.	
tubicolous organism	???	Deep-water	Annulated tubular fossils, which may be flexible in nature, affinities unknown.	
unnamed frond specimen	???	Shallow-water	Frond-like fossils. Previously reported as Rugoinfractus, although was instead considered a body fossil and not a trace fossil, affinities unknown.	
segmented problematicum	???	Shallow-water	Segmented fossil, appears to be trilobate.	
Probable Arboreomorpha	???	Deep-water	Segmented fossil, bears similarities to the arboreomorphs.	
“petaloids”	???	Deep-water	Segmented petaloid fossils, which are either assignable to Pteridinium, Windermeria, and Inkrylovia.	
New taxon?	???	Deep-water	Fossil with two anchor-shaped structures arising from a central division, and bears similarities to Parvancorina. Is noted to possibly be a new genus.	

== See also ==
- List of fossiliferous stratigraphic units in Northwest Territories
