= Isomer (Proarticulata) =

Element in fossils

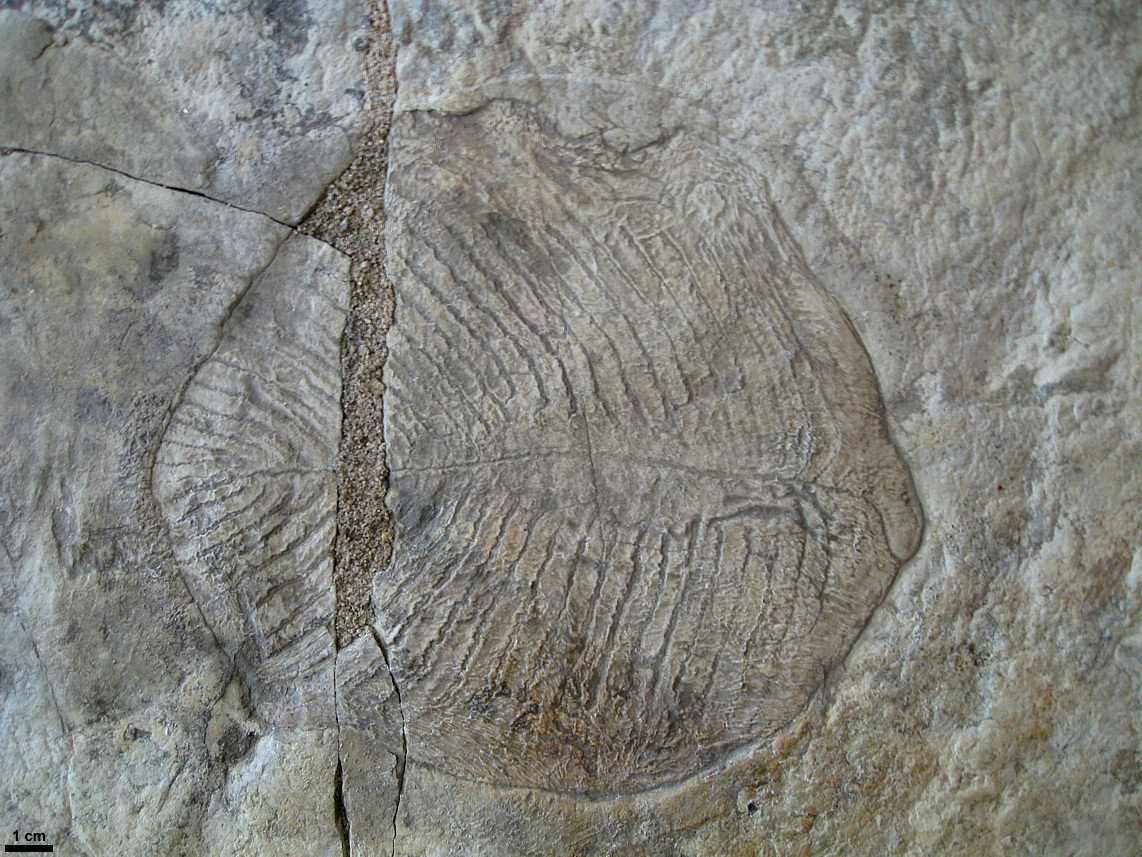
Yorgia waggoneri demonstrate obvious asymmetry of left and right parts of the body

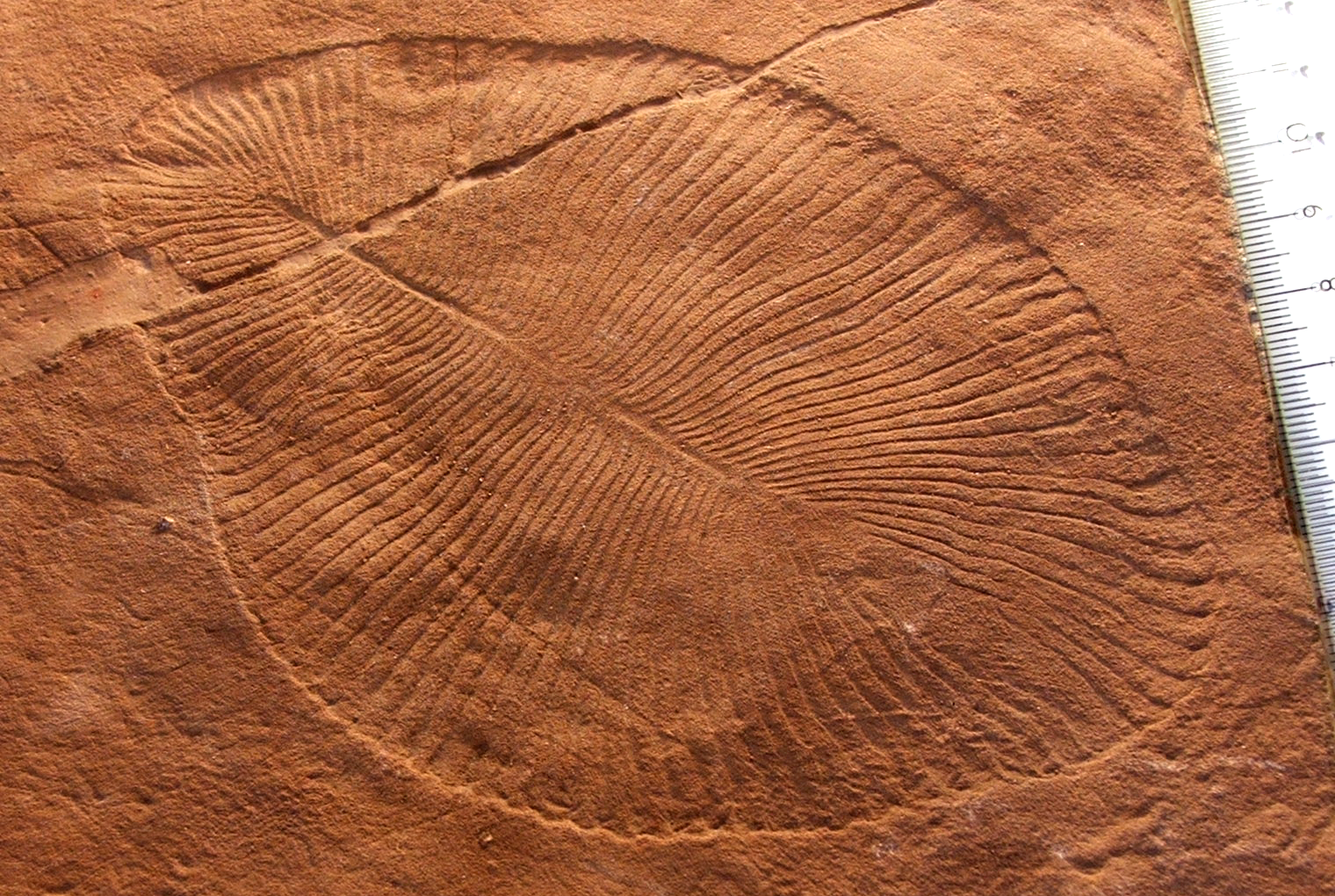
The Dickinsonia costata is subradial divided by isomers entirely, the anterior part (head) of the body on the right-bottom

Isomer (Greek isos = "equal", méros = "part") is an element of transverse body articulation of the bilateral fossil animals of the phylum Proarticulata from the Ediacaran (Vendian) period. This term has been proposed by Andrey Yu. Ivantsov, a Russian paleontologist from the Laboratory of the Precambrian organisms, Paleontological Institute, Russian Academy of Sciences.

== Morphology ==
Proarticulatan isomers are distinct from the segments of the Annelida and Panarthropoda, as each of these elements occupies only half of width of a body and are organized in an alternating pattern relatively to the axis of the body. In other words, although proarticulatans are bilaterally symmetrical, one side is not the direct mirror image of its opposite. Opposite isomers of left and right side are located with displacement of half of its width. This phenomenon is described as the symmetry of gliding reflection. However, this type of symmetry is not unique to Proarticulata, a modern lancelets have analogous asymmetric arrangement of myomeres and somites of larvae.

The first element in the row is a right isomer on the anterior end of the dorsal side. All successive isomers are similar to it, but gradually decrease in size and in angle of inclination from the anterior part (head) of the body to the posterior end. New isomers were added at the growth point at the posterior end of the proarticulate body. With age, the addition of new isomers slowed down and probably stopped, the growth point shifted from the posterior end, and the relative length of the posterior isomers increased, sometimes significantly. The overall number of body isomers amounts from several pairs (Vendia, Onega) to several hundreds (Dickinsonia).

== Variation of articulation across classes ==
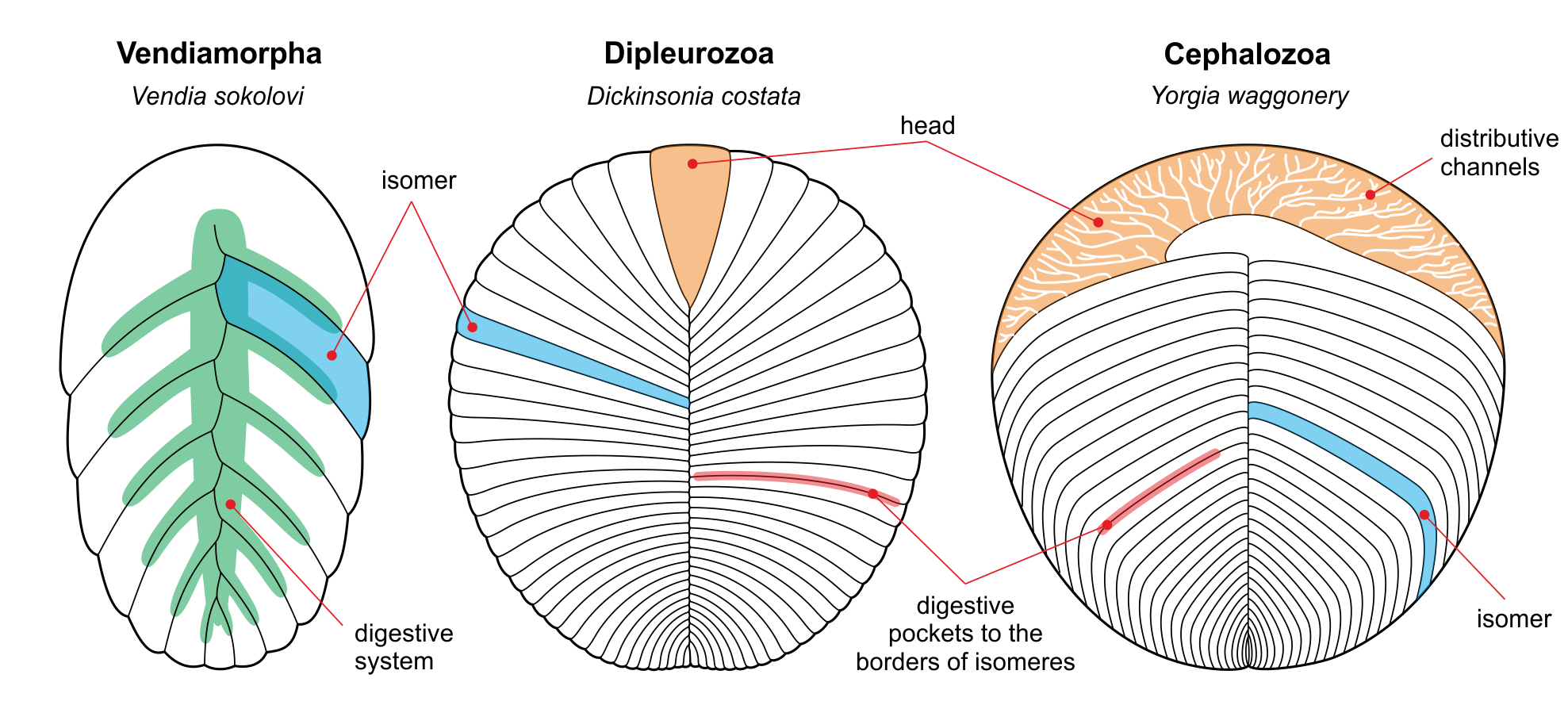
Examples of the classes of Proarticulata, including reconstructions of Vendia sokolovi, Dickinsonia costata and Yorgia waggoneri.

=== Vendiamorpha ===
The body is completely segmented, with all isomers curved towards the posterior, and the first isomer is normally much larger than the rest. The first two isomers at the anterior dorsal end are partly fused together to form a headshield-like structure. (e.g., Vendia, Paravendia, and Karakhtia).

=== Cephalozoa ===
These proarticulatans demonstrate incomplete segmentation, as the anterior zone is free of isomers, often making a "hairband" like appearance. (Example cephalozoans include Yorgia, Praecambridium, Andiva, Archaeaspinus, Ivovicia, Spriggina, Marywadea and Cyanorus.) Some cephalozoans from the family Yorgiidae demonstrate pronounced asymmetry of left and right parts of the body. For instance, Yorgia’s initial right isomer is the only one which spreads far towards the left side of the body. Archaeaspinus has an unpaired anterior lobe confined by the furrow to the left side only.

=== Dipleurozoa ===
The dipleurozoan body is subradial divided by isomers entirely (e.g., Dickinsonia and Phyllozoon). Juvenile Dickinsonia show an undivided anterior area but this region was reduced in the course of ontogeny, and in adult Dickinsonia-like proarticulates changed so strongly that became almost indistinguishable from isomers.

=== Proarticulata Incertae sedis ===
In Cephalonega stepanovi and Tamga hamulifera all isomers are encircled by a peripheral undivided zone. In the former, the isomers remain in contact with each other, while in the latter, the isomers do not touch.

== See also ==
- Sea pen - extant order with some members exhibiting glide reflection symmetry
