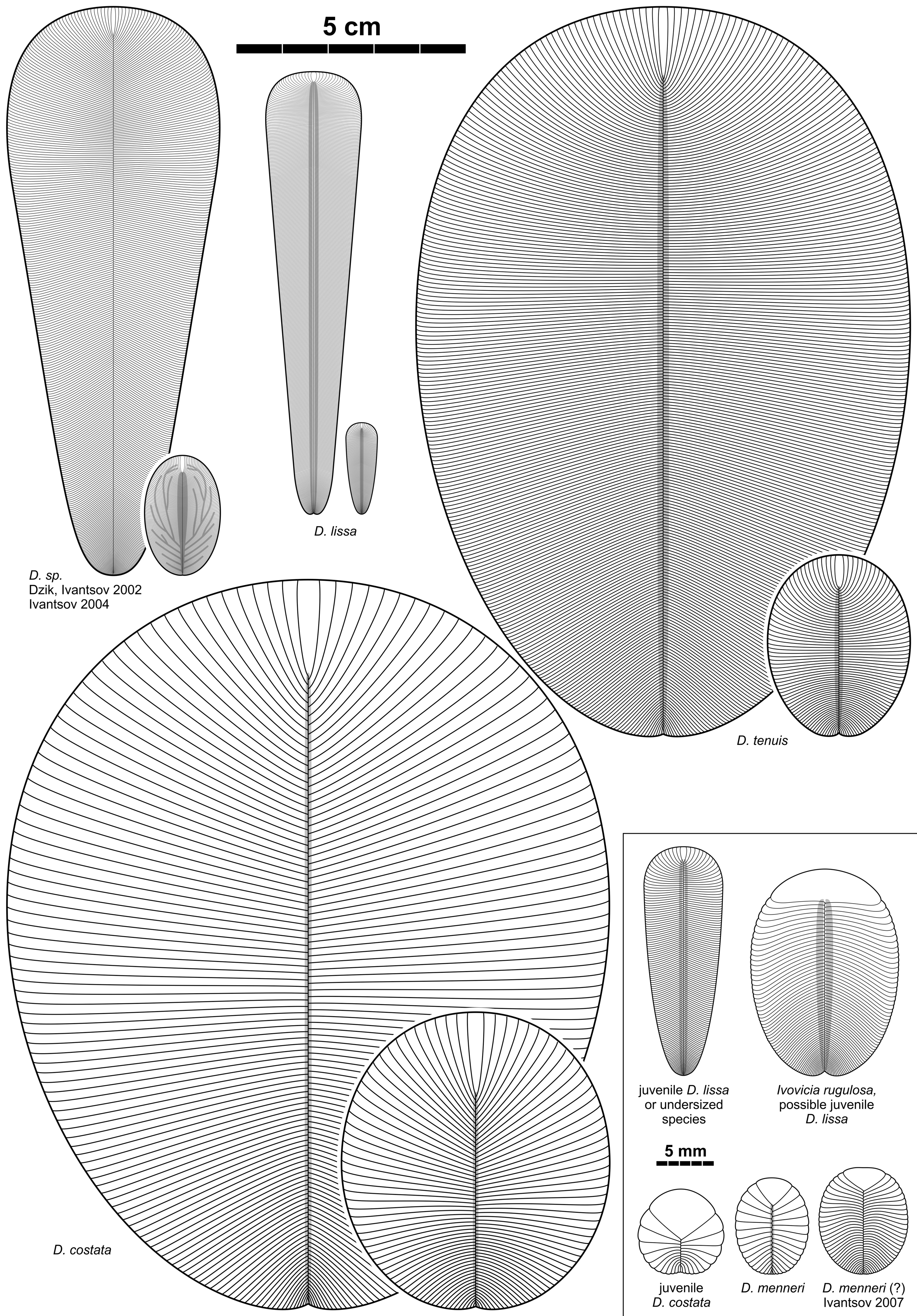
- Different species of Dickinsonia

Scientific classification
- Kingdom: Animalia
- Phylum: †Proarticulata
- Class: †Dipleurozoa; Harrington & Moore 1955

Type species
- †Dickinsonia costata Sprigg, 1947

Taxa
- †Dickinsoniidae; †Dickinsonia; †?Windermeria; †Palaeoplatoda

= Dipleurozoa =

Dipleurozoa Temporal range: Ediacaran

Extinct class of animals

Dipleurozoa (or Dickinsoniomorpha) are extinct proarticulate organisms of the Ediacaran period, which had a flat and more or less ovoid shape. Polychaete worms were treated, however it seems more likely that they were vendobionts. The most representative genus is Dickinsonia, which gives the name to the class (in the case of Dickinsoniomorpha).

At first glance, the organisms appear to be bilateral that are made up of serial segments. However, this can be misleading, as there are indications that the structures to the left and right of the body axis were not arranged in pairs, but offset each other alternately; like the segments of many rangeomorphs.

They show a front and a back end, the footprints indicate some capacity for movement. The prints have led to the assumption that organisms could feed on microbial biota by absorption through the body wall, similar to recent Placozoa, and digested with the ventral (abdominal) surface.

== Gallery ==
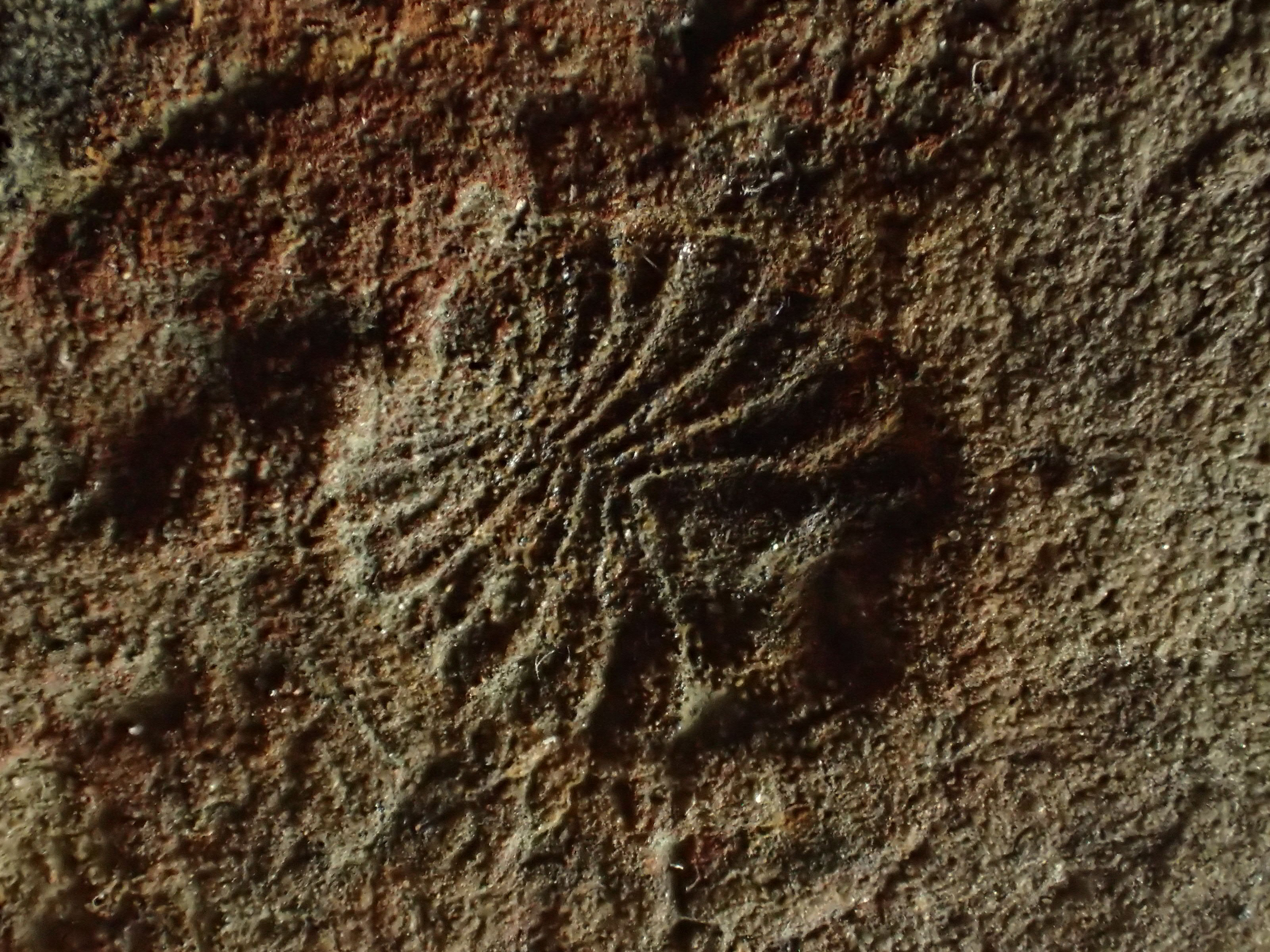
Dickinsonia menneri

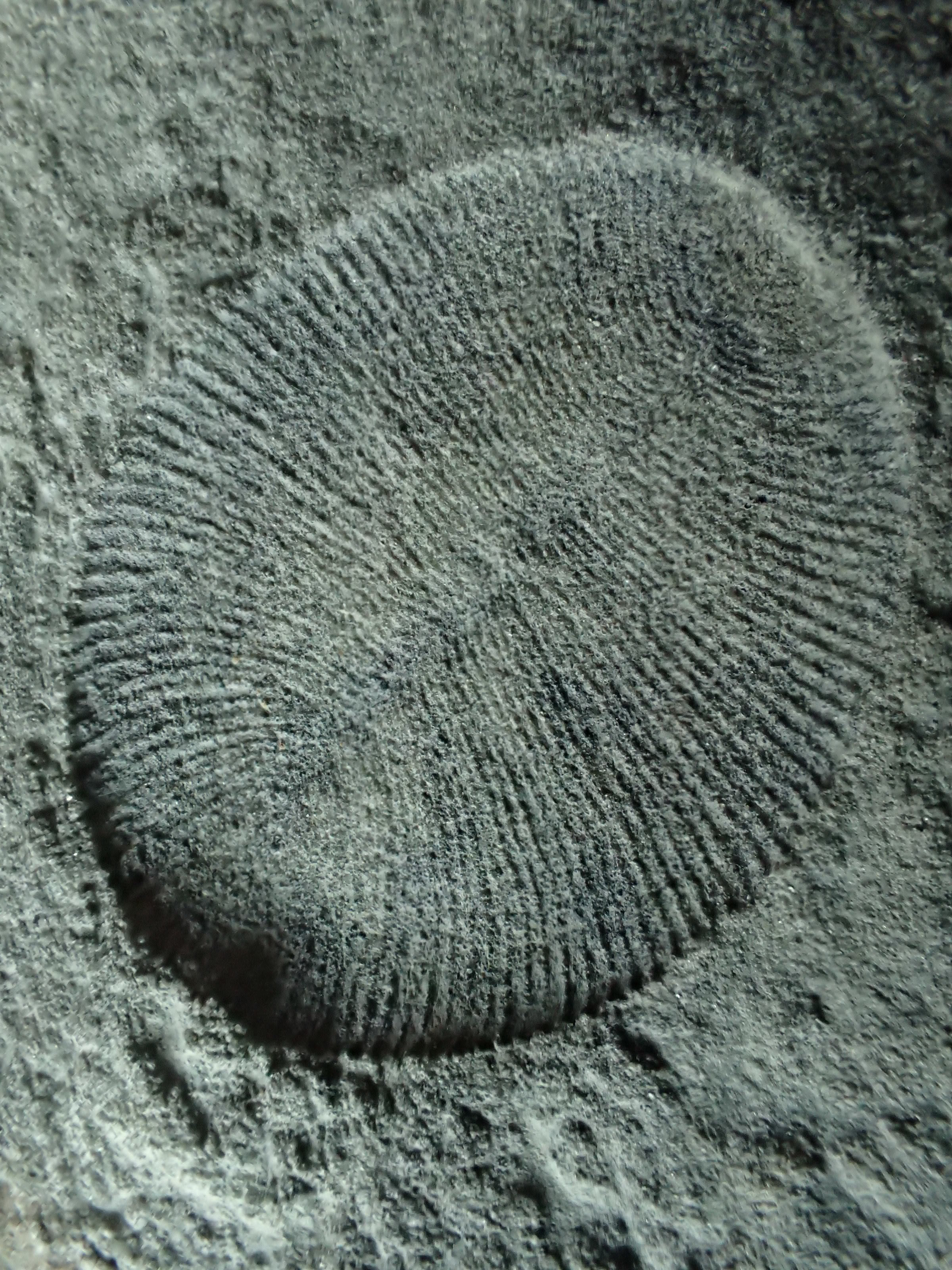
Dickinsonia tenuis

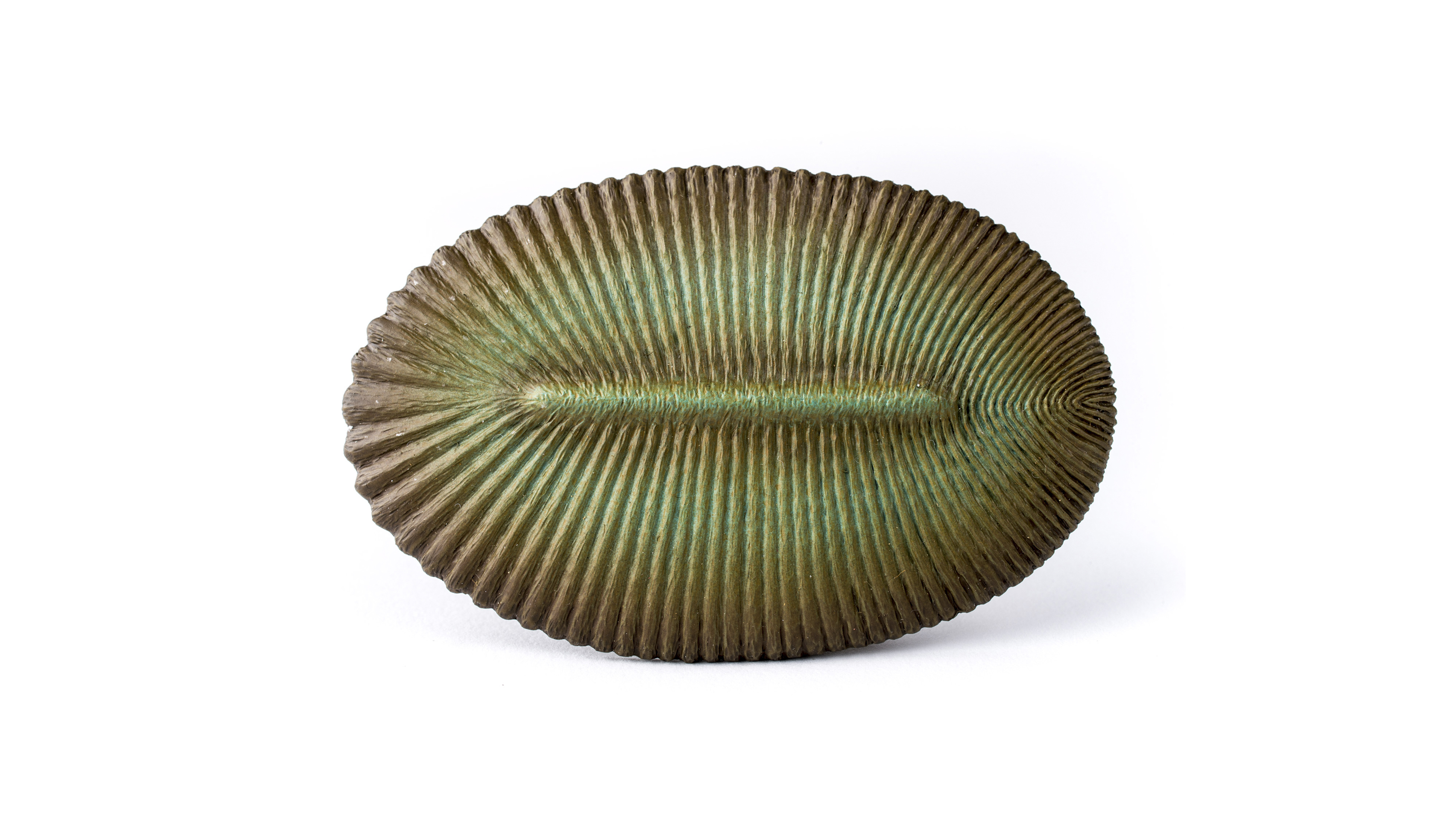
Dickinsonia costata

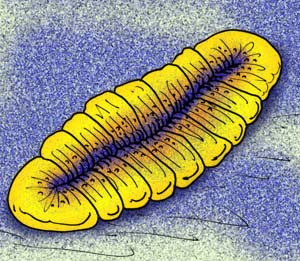
Windermeria
