= Sekwitubulus =

Sekwitubulus Temporal range: Ediacaran

Scientific classification
- Domain: Incertae sedis
- Genus: †Sekwitubulus; Carbone, Narbonne, Macdonald, and Boag, 2015
- Species: †S. annulatus

Binomial name
- †Sekwitubulus annulatus Carbone, Narbonne, Macdonald, and Boag, 2015

Genus of organism

Sekwitubulus annulatus is an Ediacaran tubular fossil from the Blueflower Formation in Canada. Sekwitubulus is a monotypic genus, containing only the single species. S. annulatus is possibly a type of annelid worm.

== Discovery and naming ==
Sekwitubulus was found at Sekwi Brook, Blueflower Formation in the Mackenzie Mountains of Northwestern Canada and formally described in 2015.

The generic name Sekwitubulus derives from the place name of Sekwi Brook, where the first specimens were found, and the Latin word tubulus, to mean "small tube". The specific name annulatus is after the Latin word for "rigged/annular ornamentation".

== Description ==
Sekwitubulus annulatus consists of straight and rigid tubes, with the largest known coming in at 52 mm (2.0 in) in height and 5 mm (0.20 in) in width. The tube walls are thin, with annular ridges spaced along the length of the tube at 1 mm (0.039 in) intervals on the outside, with a smooth interior. The holotype specimen is noted to have a tentaculate disc, which is the same width as the tube itself, with rays extending up to 1 mm (0.039 in) out from the disc itself, although the other remaining specimens do not have this disc preserved.

== Affinites ==
Specimens of Sekwitubulus can be confirmed as a shelly tube by the fact that one specimens shows no sign of compression, with annulations on its exterior, but non in the interior. Whist the overall composition of the tube is unknown, the rigidity highly suggests that the tube was most likely mineralised in life. Whilst there are many tubular forms present in the Ediacaran, like Somatohelix and Corumbella, it is noted to be most similar to the 'sabelliditids', which includes the likes of Calyptrina, Sabellidites and Saarina, although Sekwitubulus has a much straighter and rigid tube, alongside a differing morphology in its annulations.

Another tubular form, Wutubus, is noted to also share some similarities, like a holdfast disc and are similar in size, although Wutubus has a much more conical shape and consists of increasingly inflated units, whilst Sekwitubulus is uniform in width along the whole length of its body. There are also tubular forms from the nearby Wood Canyon Formation, assigned to Cloudina, that share possible similarities, although it is noted that studies done on Cloudina note a nested cone-in-cone tube construction, which are again very distinct from the uniform tube of Sekwitubulus, alongside the fact that the Wood Canyon tubes appear to curve and are conical in shape.

The frayed holdfast disc has been noted to bare similarities with Primocandelabrum, which has a similar holdfast morphology, although that’s were the similarities end, as the main tube itself does not resemble any known stem of the petalonamids, alongside the rigidity of the tube itself being out of line with known frond material. The relatively small size of the tube is also unfit to hold up a frond-like body, providing little stability in what is noted to be a turbulent environment.

Keeping the holdfast disc in mind, it is most likely that the tube would have stood vertically above the substrate in life, similar to modern Polychaete worms. There are also further similarities with polychaetes, like the rigid shell, the collar-like annular ridges and the lack of a taper. Although, it is noted that this does not necessitate a phylogenetic relationship between Sekwitubulus and polychaete worms.
