= Vendia =

Vendia Temporal range: Ediacaran 565–550 Ma
- Fossil of Vendia sokolovi

Scientific classification
- Kingdom: Animalia
- Phylum: †Proarticulata
- Class: †Vendiamorpha
- Family: †Vendiidae
- Genus: †Vendia; Keller, 1969

Species
- V. rachiata Ivantsov, 2004; V. sokolovi Keller, 1969

Fossil taxon

Vendia is an extinct vendiamorph from the late Ediacaran, estimated to be around 567 - 550 Ma years old, it contains two species, V. sokolovi and V. rachiata, both of which are restricted to the Ust' Pinega Formation in Northwestern Russia.

== Discovery and naming ==
The first fossil materials of Vendia were found in a core from a Yarensk borehole that was collected from the Ust' Pinega Formation of the Arkhangelsk Oblast, northwestern Russia in 1963, and was formally described and named in 1969 as Vendia sokolovi. A Further two species were found and named in 2001 and 2004, that being V. janae, (Redescribed as Paravendia janae in 2004) and V. rachiata.

The generic name Vendia is derived from the older Russian name for the Ediacaran, Vendian. The specific name sokolovi is derived from the surname of Boris Sokolov, a well-known Russian geologist and paleontologist, and who also created the concept of the Vendian period itself, which Vendia takes its name from. The specific name rachiata is derived from the Latin word rachis, to mean "stem", in reference to the preserved internal organs found in most specimens.

== Description ==
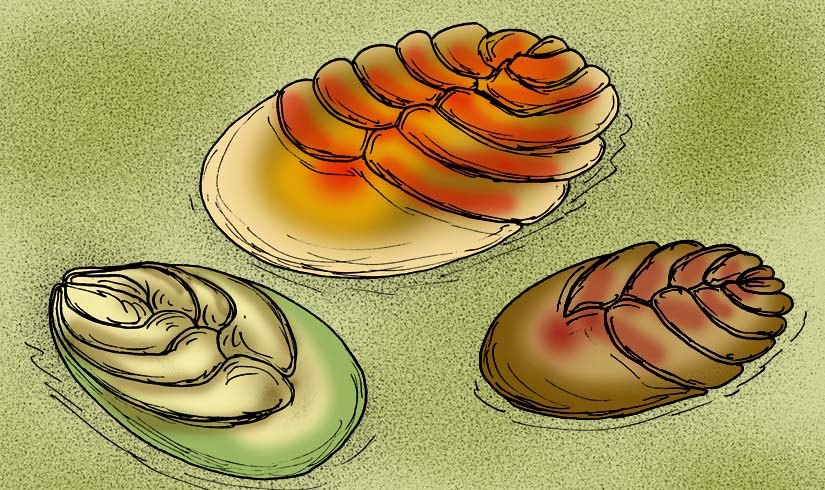
Paravendia janae (bottom left), Vendia sokolovi (top), V. rachiata (bottom right)

All species of Vendia are oval in shape, ranging from 4.5–12.5 mm (0.2–0.5 in) in overall length. As with all proarticulates, their bodies consist of segmented isomers, which are arranged in a glide reflection along a central axis. Unlike other proarticulates, the larger isomers nearer to the front wrap round to cover the smaller isomers nearer the back, with the most extreme case of this being seen in V. rachiata, and the now separate genus Paravendia. The initial right isomer extends over to the left side, forming a 'head-like' structure, which has been noted to be similar to cephalization.

Vendia is also noted for having internal structures preserved, which consisted of a long tube-like structure running through the center of the organism, with non-branching appendages coming off the central tube at the borders of two isomers. These structures are interpreted as a digestive-distributive system, with V. rachiata having the smallest system and an absent appendage for the initial right isomer, and V. sokolovi bearing the larger system of the two, along with an appendage for each isomer.

== Taxonomy ==
Three Vendia species have been described to date, although only two remain as Vendia with one being reassigned, with the following differentiating characteristics:

- V. sokolovi, represented by only one specimen that is 11 mm (0.4 in) in length, has 7 isomers per side. The lateral appendages of the internal system extend almost along the full length of each isomer.
- V. rachiata differs from V. sokolovi in the smaller number of isomers. The largest specimens are up to 12.5 mm (0.5 in) in length, with all specimens having 5 isomers per side, with the length of each isomer quickly decreasing posteriorly. The lateral appendages are much shorter. This species has been found only in the Solza River locality, Onega Peninsula of the White Sea area, Arkhangelsk Oblast.
- The third species, V. janae was reassigned to the separate genus Paravendia. It differs from the genus Vendia in the shape and relative position of the isomers, with the larger initial isomers curving around and meeting at the 'tail' point, completely covering the smaller isomers nearer to the rear. It is also known to grow much larger, with the largest specimen coming in at 36 mm (1.4 in) in length. It is from Zimnie Gory locality, White Sea.

== See also ==
- List of Ediacaran genera
