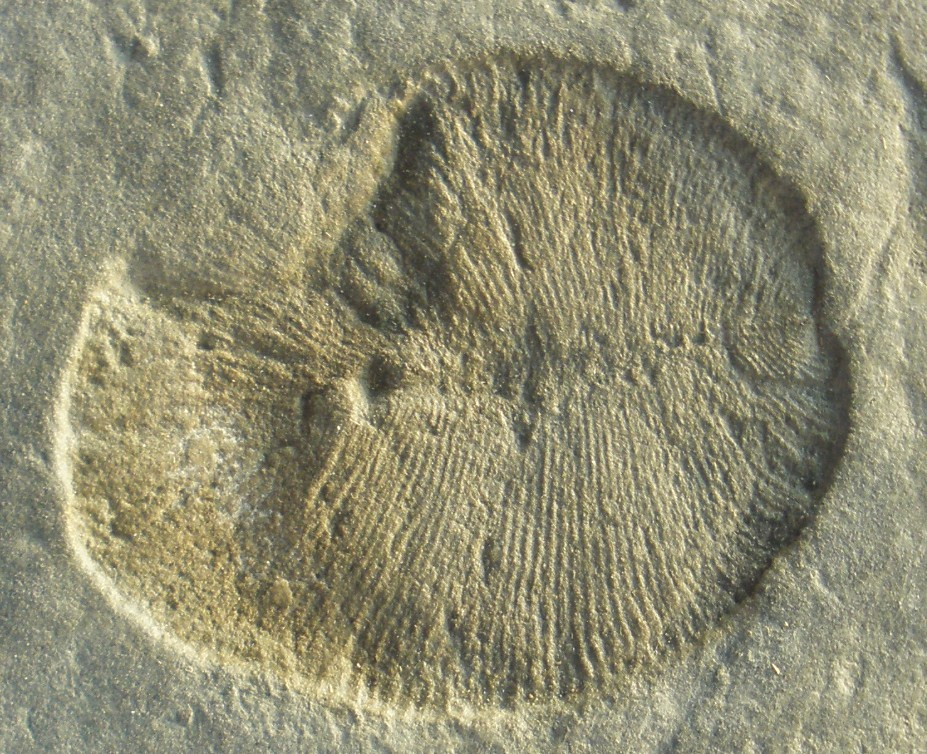
- Cast of Dickinsonia costata

Scientific classification
- Kingdom: Animalia
- Phylum: †Proarticulata
- Class: †Dipleurozoa
- Family: †Dickinsoniidae
- Genus: †Dickinsonia; Sprigg, 1947

Type species
- †Dickinsonia costata Sprigg, 1947

Species
- D. costata Sprigg, 1947; D. tenuis Glaessner & Wade, 1966; D. menneri (Keller, 1976); D. aurorae Ivantsov & Burmistrova, 2025; D. serpentina Ivantsov & Burmistrova, 2025; D. densa Sozonov et al., 2026

Synonyms
- Genus synonymy: Chondroplon? Wade, 1971; Papilionata Sprigg, 1947; Vendomia Keller & Fedonkin, 1976; D. costata synonymy: Papilionata eyrei Sprigg, 1947; D. minima Sprigg, 1949; D. elongata Glaessner & Wade, 1966; D. spriggi Harrington & Moore, 1955; D. tenuis synonymy: D. brachina Wade, 1972; D. lissa Wade, 1972; D. rex Jenkins, 1992

= Dickinsonia =

Dickinsonia Temporal range: Late Ediacaran, 567–550 Ma

Extinct genus of early animals

Dickinsonia is a genus of extinct organism that lived during the late Ediacaran period in what is now Australia, China, Russia, Canada and Ukraine. It had a round, approximately bilaterally symmetric body with multiple segments running along it. It could range from a few millimeters to over a meter in length, and likely lived in shallow waters, feeding on the microbial mats that dominated the seascape at the time.

As a member of the Ediacaran biota, its relationships to other organisms have been heavily debated. It was initially proposed to be a jellyfish, and over the years has been claimed to be a land-dwelling lichen, a placozoan, or even a giant protist. Currently, the most popular interpretation is that it was a seafloor-dwelling animal, perhaps a primitive stem group bilaterian, although this is still contentious. Among other Ediacaran organisms, it shares a close resemblance to other segmented forms like Vendia, Yorgia, and Spriggina, and has been proposed to be a member of the phylum Proarticulata or alternatively the morphogroup Dickinsoniomorpha. It is disputed whether the segments of Dickinsonia are bilaterally symmetric across the midline, or are offset from each other via glide reflection, or possibly both.

== Description ==
Dickinsonia fossils are known only in the form of imprints and casts in sandstone beds. The specimens found range from a few millimetres to about 1.4 metres (4 ft 7 in) in length, and from a fraction of a millimetre to a few millimetres thick. They are nearly bilaterally symmetric, segmented, round or oval in outline, slightly expanded to one end (i.e. egg-shaped outline). The rib-like segments are radially inclined towards the wide and narrow ends, and the width and length of the segments increases towards the wide end of the fossil. The body is divided into two by a midline ridge or groove, except for a single unpaired segment at one end, dubbed the "anterior most unit" suggested to represent the front of the organism. It is disputed whether the segments are offset from each other following glide reflection, and are thus isomers, or whether the segments are symmetric across the midline, and thus follow true bilateral symmetry, as the specimens displaying the offset may be the result of taphonomic distortion. Dickinsonia could perhaps have had both at the same time, with one side of the organism being glide reflected and the other having true symmetry.

The body of Dickinsonia is suggested to have been sack-like, with the outer layer being made of a resistant but unmineralised material. Some specimens from Russia show the presence of branched internal structures. Some authors have suggested that the underside of the body bore cilia, as well as infolded pockets. Dickinsonia is suggested to have lacked a mouth, anus and gut tract.

Dickinsonia is suggested to have grown by adding a new pair of segments/isomers at the end opposite the unpaired "anterior most unit". Dickinsonia probably exhibited indeterminate growth (having no maximum size), though it is suggested that the addition of new segments slowed down later in growth. Deformed specimens from Russia indicate that individuals of Dickinsonia could regenerate after being damaged.

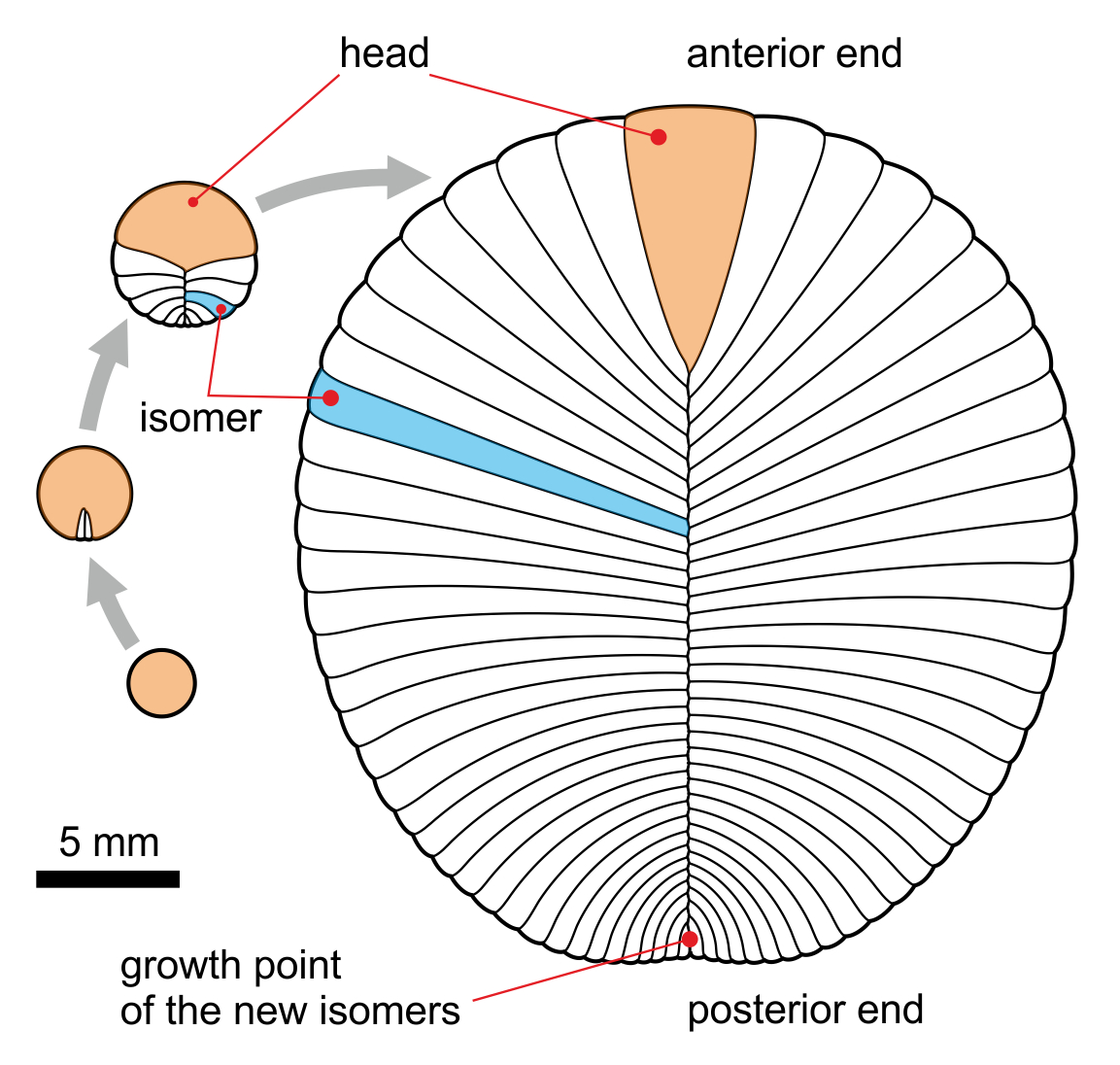
Ontogeny of Dickinsonia costata following the glide reflection interpretation

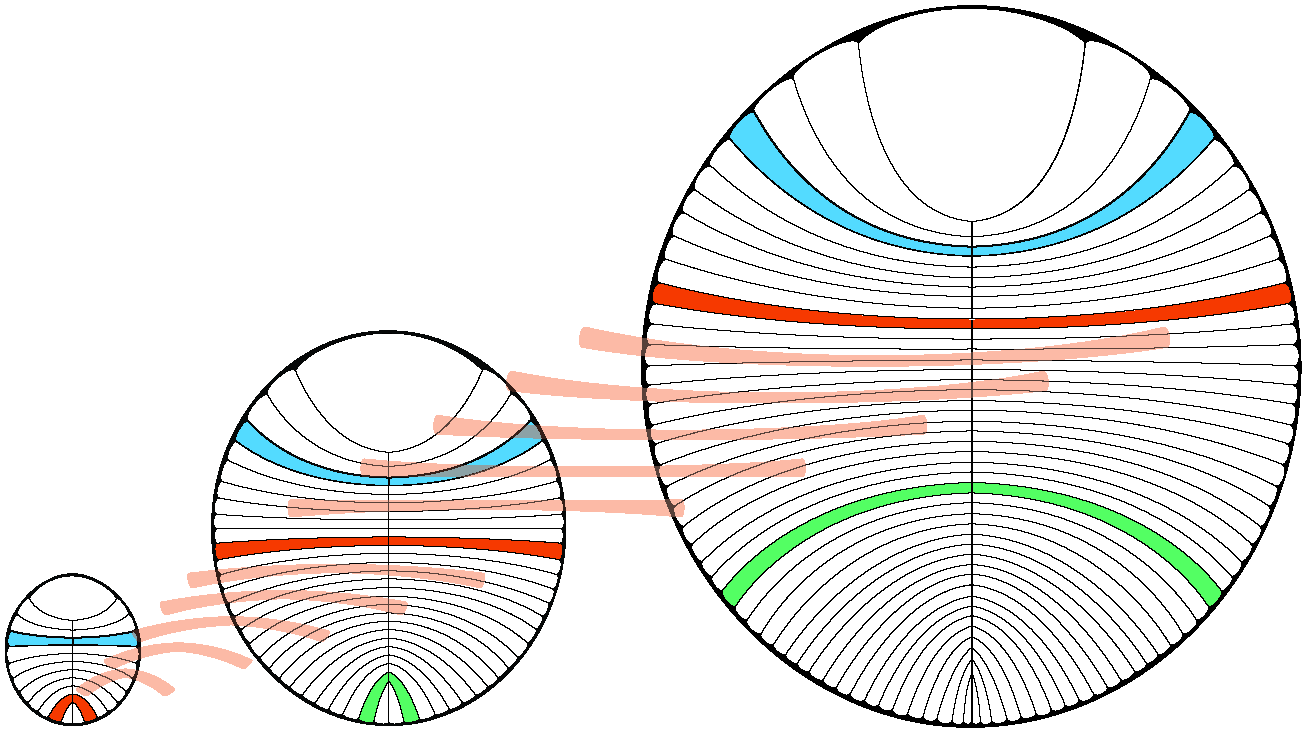
Growth of D. costata under bilateral symmetry interpretation

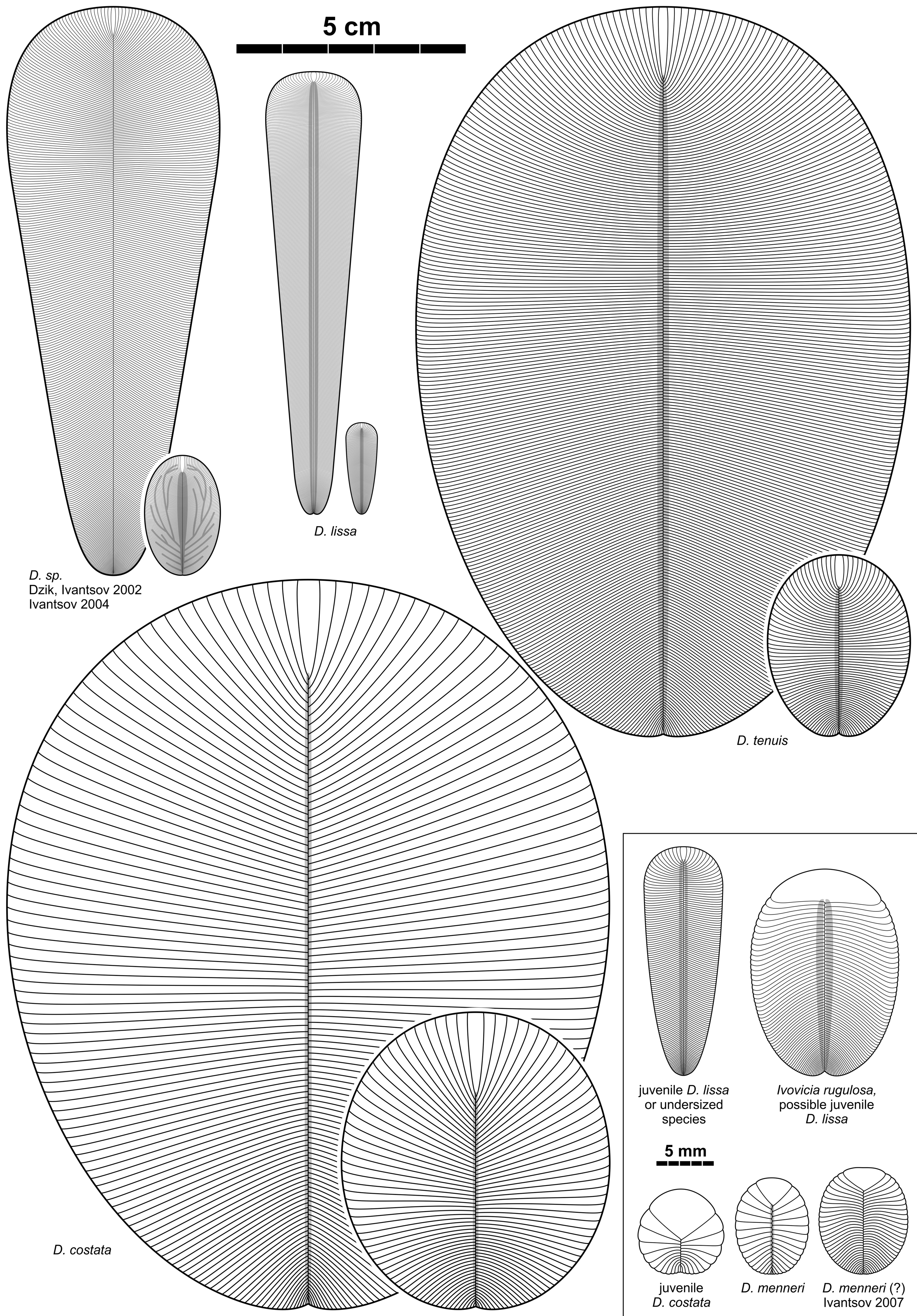
Diagram of various Dickinsonia species

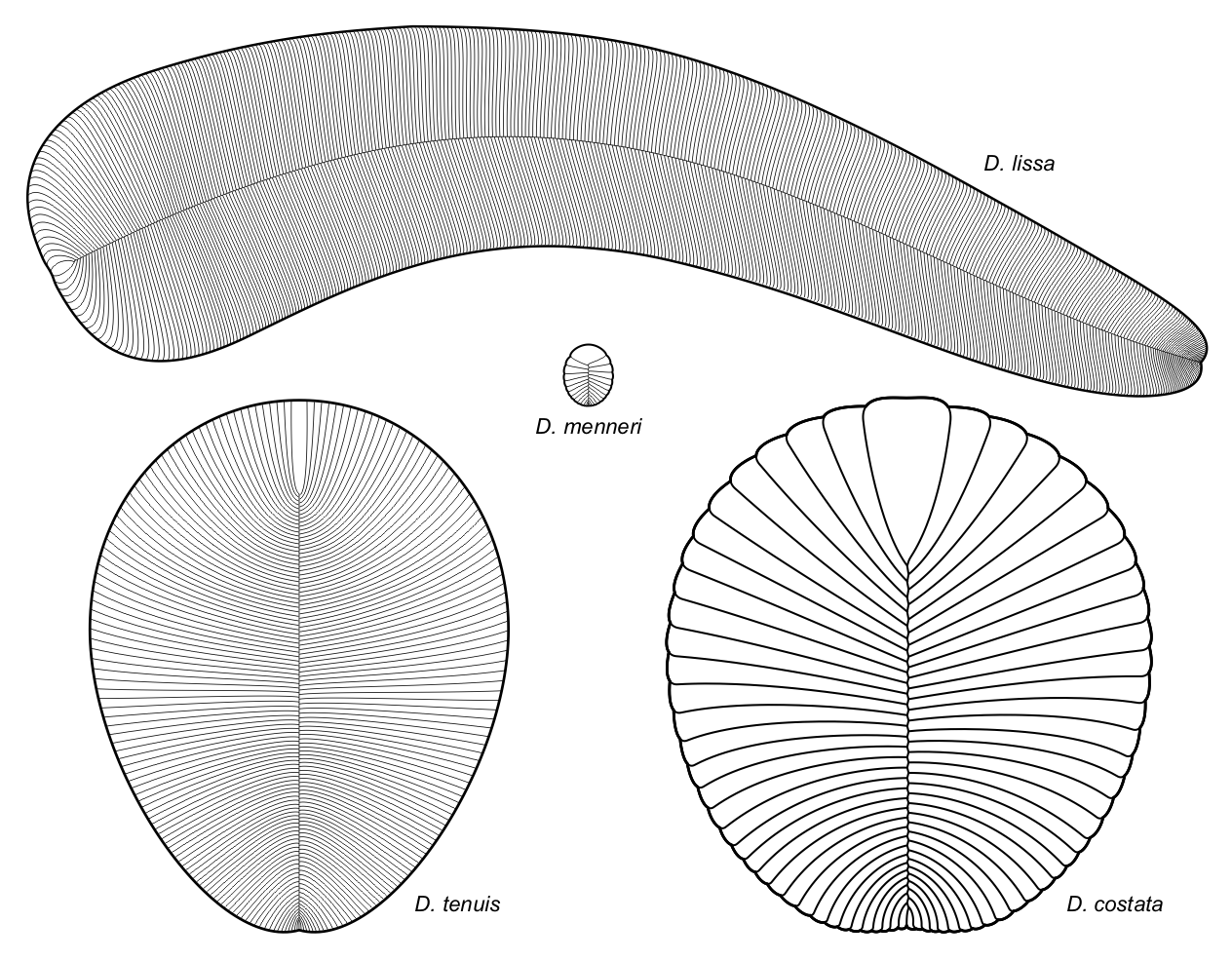
Diagram of various Dickinsonia species (cont.)

== Ecology ==
Dickinsonia is suggested to have been a mobile marine organism that lived on the seafloor and fed by consuming microbial mats growing on the seabed using structures present on its underside. Dickinsonia-shaped trace fossils, presumed to represent feeding impressions, sometimes found in chains demonstrating this behaviour have been observed. These trace fossils have been assigned to the genus Epibaion. A 2022 study suggested that Dickinsonia temporarily adhered itself to the seafloor by the use of mucus, which may have been an adaptation to living in very shallow water environments.

== Taphonomy ==
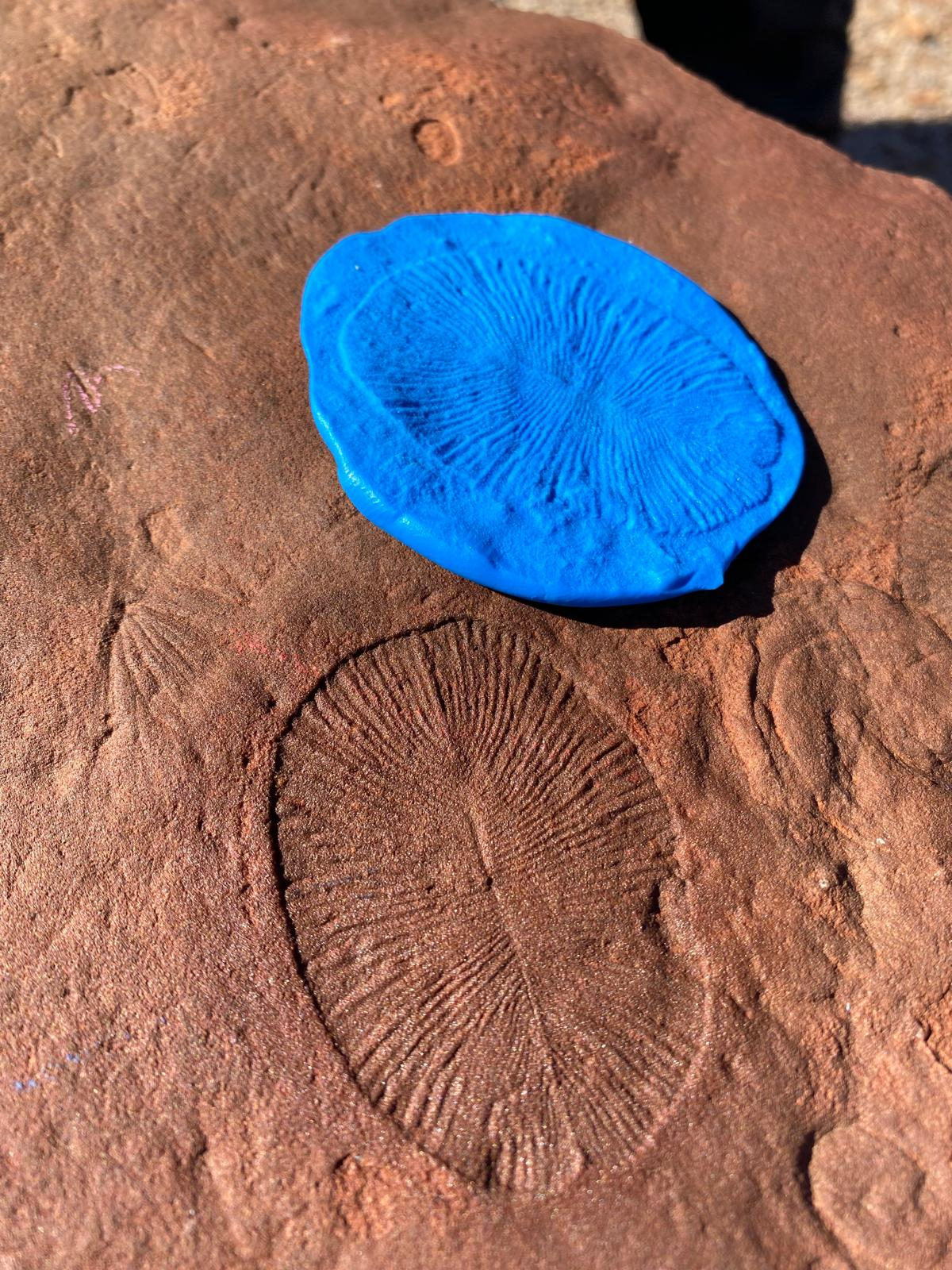
Dickinsonia observed in situ at Nilpena Ediacara National Park, with negative relief

Dickinsonia fossils are preserved as negative impressions on the bases of sandstone beds. Such fossils are imprints of the upper sides of the benthic organisms that have been buried under the sand. The imprints formed as a result of cementation of the sand before complete decomposition of the body. The mechanism of cementation is not quite clear; among many possibilities, the process could have arisen from conditions which gave rise to pyrite "death masks" on the decaying body, or perhaps it was due to the carbonate cementation of the sand. The imprints of the bodies of organisms are often strongly compressed, distorted, and sometimes partly extend into the overlying rock. These deformations appear to show attempts by the organisms to escape from the falling sediment.

Rarely, Dickinsonia have been preserved as a cast in massive sandstone lenses, where it occurs together with Pteridinium, Rangea and some others. Large beds containing many hundreds of Dickinsonia (along with many other species) are preserved in situ within Nilpena Ediacara National Park, with park rangers providing on-site guided tours in the cooler months of the year. These specimens are products of events where organisms were first stripped from the sea-floor, transported and deposited within sand flow. In such cases, stretched and ripped Dickinsonia occur. The first such specimen was described as a separate genus and species, Chondroplon bilobatum and later re-identified as Dickinsonia.

== Taxonomy ==
=== History ===
Dickinsonia was first discovered in 1946 at the Ediacara Member of the Rawnsley Quartzite, Flinders Ranges in South Australia. Reg Sprigg described Dickinsonia the following year and named it after Ben Dickinson, then Director of Mines for South Australia, and head of the government department that employed Sprigg. Additional specimens of Dickinsonia have also been found in the Mogilev Formation in the Dniester River Basin of Ukraine, the White Sea in Russia, and the Dengying Formation in the Yangtze Gorges area, South China. (ca. 551–543 Ma).

Sprigg's initial interpretation was that Dickinsonia was a jellyfish-like organism from the early Cambrian. He suspected that the imprint left behind was a cast of the flattened bell, and that the grooves radiating from the center were possibly some sort of canal system or rigid structure. Further analysis in 1949 theorized that the bilateral nature of Dickinsonia could have been a sign of higher complexity, but was unwilling to firmly classify it into any taxon. In 1955, Harrington and Moore published their own classification of Dickinsonia, assigning it to class Dipleurozoa, order Dickinsoniida, and family Dickinsoniidae in the now defunct group Coelenterata.

After the publication of the undisputibly Precambrian Charnia in 1958, the existence of Proterozoic life became more widely accepted among paleontologists. This discovery lead Dickinsonia and other South Australian organisms to be properly recognized as Precambrian in age. The segmentation of the recently discovered Spriggina from the same locality lead it and the similarly segmented Dickinsonia to be classified as annelids, which remained the leading hypothesis for the next few decades, albeit with reservations.

In 1985, following studies that concluded that Dickinsonia and related taxa had glide symmetry rather than bilteral symmetry, a new phylum, Proarticulata, was erected to include the Ediacaran organisms that were assumed to have glide reflection, which included Spriggina, Vendia, and several others. Their relationships to other organisms remain uncertain and numerous hypotheses have been offered since. Adolf Seilacher proposed that most Ediacaran organisms were closely related to each other, as part of the grouping "Vendobionta", though recent authors argue that this grouping is likely polyphyletic. Some authors do not use Proarticulata and instead use the clade Dickinsoniomorpha. In 2013 Gregory Retallack proposed that Dickinsonia and other Ediacaran lifeforms were lichens, arguing that their preservation methods were similar. This has been broadly rejected by most authors, who argue that a marine environment better fits available evidence. Other proposals have included giant protists, placozoans, or cnidarians.

=== Modern classification ===
While Dickinsonia's relationships to other organisms are still highly contentious, most biologists consider an animal with stem-bilaterian affinity to be the most likely interpretation. In 2018 it was found that many Russian specimens contained cholesterol, which is only produced by animals, supporting an animal affinity. These results have been questioned by other authors, however, who consider the association between the cholesterol and Dickinsonia fossils to not be definitive. The predictable growth patterns, clear left and right sides, and a posterior-anterior axis all suggest that Dickinsonia was a bilaterian. However, most modern bilaterians have a mouth and anus connected by a gut, none of which has been found in Dickinsonia. This almost certainly rules out Dickinsonia to be a crown-bilaterian, but could mean it was a stem-bilaterian.

==== Species ====
Since 1947, a total of 12 species have been described, four of which are currently considered valid and two more are confirmed as distinct but require valid publication. The other six have been considered to be invalid:

Species	Authority	Location	Status	Notes	Refs
Dickinsonia aurorae	Ivantsov & Burmistrova, 2025	Russia	pending validation	(Note: The species is similar to D. tenuis and D. serpentina in its elongated body shape and thin isomers. It differs from them by its comparatively greater width and pear‑shaped head lobe.)	
Dickinsonia brachina	Wade, 1972	Australia	invalid	synonym of D. tenuis	
Dickinsonia costata	Sprigg, 1947	Australia, Russia, and Ukraine	valid	(Note: Unlike other species, D. costata has comparatively rounded body and fewer, wider segments / isomers.)	
Dickinsonia densa	Sozonov et al, 2026	Russia	valid	(Note: This species features a relatively shorter cephalic lobe and thinner isomers.)	
Dickinsonia elongata	Glaessner & Wade, 1966	Australia	invalid	synonym of D. costata	
Dickinsonia lissa	Wade, 1972	Australia	invalid	synonym of D. tenuis	
Dickinsonia menneri	Keller, 1976	Russia	valid	(Note: Dickinsonia menneri originally was identified as Vendomia but re-classified as Dickinsonia by Ivantsov (2007a)) (Note: D. menneri is a small organism up to 8 mm in length, and strongly resembles juvenile specimens of D. costata with its small number of isomers and well-marked head. D. menneri differs from juvenile D. costata by its slightly more elongated form.)	
Dickinsonia minima	Sprigg, 1949	Australia	invalid	synonym of D. costata	
Dickinsonia rex	Jenkins, 1992	Australia	invalid	synonym of D. tenuis	
Dickinsonia serpentina	Ivantsov & Burmistrova, 2025	Russia	pending validation	(Note: The species is similar to D. tenuis in its elongated body shape and thin isomers. It differs from it by its extremely small body width, with the maximum in the anterior part, a very short nead lobe, and a high paired ridge of the axial strand.)	
Dickinsonia spriggi	Harrington & Moore, 1955	Australia	invalid	synonym of D. costata	
Dickinsonia tenuis	Glaessner & Wade, 1966	Australia and Russia	valid	(Note: Dickinsonia tenuis strongly resembles D. costata, but differs from it by more narrow and numerous segments, sparingly lengthened oval form of the body.)	

Indeterminate remains, possibly assignable to D. tenuis or D. costata, are known from the Blueflower Formation of Canada.
