= Yarishev Formation =

Geologic formation in Moldova and Ukraine

- Stratigraphic range: Late Ediacaran; ~556.62–554.50 Ma
- Type: Formation
- Unit of: Mogilev-Podolisk Group
- Sub-units: See: Members
- Underlies: (Unconformably) Nagoriany Formation
- Overlies: Mogilev Formation
- Thickness: 40.6–100.7 m (133–330 ft)

Lithology
- Primary: Argillites
- Other: Siltstone, Sandstone, Tuffite

Location
- Coordinates: 48°26.37′N 27°41.50′E
- Country: Moldova and Ukraine

Type section
- Year defined: 1960s

The Yarishev Formation, sometimes spelt as Yaryshiv or Yarishyvska, is a late Ediacaran aged geologic formation in Moldova and Ukraine. Deposited sometime during 556.62 - 554.50±0.26 Ma, the Yarishev Formation is predominately composed of argillite rocks. The formation is also fossiliferous in nature, containing various large discoidal macrofossils, and an abundance of microfossils.

== History of research ==
Prior to the 1960s, knowledge on the formations and fossils within the wider East European Platform were relatively unknown, save for the formal descriptions of the Mogilev and Ushitsa Formations in 1939 by L.F. Lungersgauzen, which were then regarded by Lungersgauzen as Cambrian and Ordovician respectively. With the onset of the 1960s, various studies were undertaken in order to compile a State geological map, which would see previously described formations, and new formations, correlated to other Ediacaran formations in the wider region. This would include the formal description and naming of the Yarishev Formation.

With this, proper paleontological studies of the Yarishev Formation, and others, would finally be undertaken. The first macroscopic Ediacaran fossils in the region would be recovered from the Bernashev Member of the Yarishev Formation by A.P. Koval in 1967, in the form of Cyclomedusa plana, which would result in further detailed studies being performed.

== Geology ==
The Yarishev Formation can be found outcropping near to the village of Mereșeuca in Ocnița District, Moldova, as well as by the Dniester River in Ukraine, where it is unconformably overlain by the argillites of the Nagoriany Formation, whilst it is underlain by the sandstones of the Mogilev Formation, and is a part of the wider Mogilev-Podolisk Group. The formation itself is primarily composed of argillites, and is split into four formally named members. The overall thickness of the formation ranges between 40.6–100.7 m (133–330 ft).

=== Members ===
The Yarishev Formation is split into three formal members, sometimes referred to as beds. These members are as follows, in ascending stratigraphic order (lowest to highest):

- Lyadova Member: This member, sometimes referred to as the "Lyadova Beds", is roughly 8.1–21.7 m (27–71 ft) thick, and is primarily composed of green and brown argillites, which is intercalated with layers of siltstone and sandstone in the upper sections. There can also be found rare intercalations of bentonitic clays and tuffitic argillites. This member was previously considered to be a part of the underlying Mogilev Formation.
- Bernashev Member: This member, sometimes referred to as the "Bernashivka/Bernashevka Beds", attains a thickness of 22 m (72 ft), and is composed of clayey, medium- to fine-grained sandstones, which are inter-bedded with siltstone layers in its lower section. Towards its middle, the sandstones give way to thinly-bedded, dark-gray to green mudstones, with occasional thin layers of sandstone laminae. At the top, the mudstones become coarse- to very-coarse-grained arkosic sandstone, which is occasionally gravelly. Throughout the member there can be found beds and interlayers of bentonitic clays.
- Bronnitza Member: This member, sometimes referred to as the "Bronnitsa Beds", ranges between 9.0–30.0 m (29.5–98.4 ft) in thickness, and is composed predominately of distinctive tuffeceous inter-beds. Used as a regional marker horizon, these inter-beds are composed of massive, red to light-brown tuffitic argillites, which sometimes possess rare intercalated layers of red brown and brown argillites and siltstone. Towards the top of the member, argillites become the dominate rock.
- Zinkov Member: This member, sometimes referred to as the "Zinkov Beds", ranges between 15.3–27.0 m (50.2–88.6 ft) in thickness, and is composed of greenish-gray, gray and dark-gray argillites, which are intercalated with layers of light-gray sandstones towards the upper sections of the member. One distinctive feature of this member are the increasing sizes and coarseness of the grains from bottom to top.

== Dating ==
The Yarishev Formation has been dated using U-Pb dating on zircon samples collected from the Lyadova and Bernashev members. The dates recovered from these samples yielded dates of 556.62±0.26 Ma and 554.50±0.26 Ma respectively.

== Paleoenvironment ==
The environment at the time of the Yarishev Formations deposition was likely that of a low-energy, inner-shelf environment, similar to formations found from the Nama Group. This has been primarily inferred from the presence of burrows found within the formation.

== Paleobiota ==
The Yarishev Formation contains a sparse record of Ediacaran macrofossils, from discoidal forms such as Cyclomedusa and Tirasiana, to frondose fossils like Charniodiscus, the agglutinated fossils of Palaeopascichnus, and the jaw-like fragments of Redkinia and Hindeodella. Meanwhile, throughout the formation, there can be found an increasingly abundant record of filamteneous microfossils, which are commonly referred to as cyanobacteria, with examples such as Lyadovia and Volyniella, the former of which was described from this formation.

Color key: Taxon / Reclassified taxon / Taxon falsely reported as present / Dubious taxon or junior synonym / Ichnotaxon / Ootaxon / Morphotaxon

Notes
Uncertain or tentative taxa are in small text
~~crossed out~~ taxa are discredited.

=== Conodont ===
Conodont
Genus	Species	Localities	Notes	Images
Hindeodella	Hindeodella sp.	Zinkov Member	Ozarkodinid conodont.	

=== Petalonamae ===
Petalonamae
Genus	Species	Localities	Notes	Images
Charniodiscus	Charniodiscus sp.	Bronnitza Member	Arboreomorph petalonamid.	

=== Porifera ===
Porifera
Genus	Species	Localities	Notes	Images
Vaveliksia	V. velikanovi	Bernashev Member	Olgunid sponge.	

=== incertae sedis ===
incertae sedis
Genus	Species	Localities	Notes	Images
Palaeopascichnus	P. delicatus	Bernashev Member	Palaeopascichnid organism.	
Redkinia	R. fedonkini	Zinkov Member	Rod-like fossils, possible jaw fragments of stem-arthropods.	
Propaleolina	P. vendiensis	Bronnitza Member	Tubular fossil.	
Palaeospinther	P. conoideus; P. nucis	Bronnitza Member	Ovoid, segmented fossil.	
Gritcenia	G. nana	Bronnitza Member	Discoidal fossil, junior synonym of Nimbia.	
Nimbia	Nimbia sp.		Discoidal fossil.	
Bronicella	B. podolica	Bronnitza Member	Discoidal fossil.	
Cyclomedusa	C. plana; C. serebrina	Bernashev Member	Discoidal fossil, probable junior synonym of Aspidella.	
Ediacaria	E. flindersi		Discoidal fossil, probable junior synonym of Aspidella.	
Tirasiana	T. discformis; T. coniformis	Bernashev Member	Discoidal fossil, probable junior synonym of Aspidella.	
Vendella	V. haelenicae	Bronnitza Member	Discoidal fossil, probable junior synonym of Aspidella.	
Medusinites	M. patellaris	Bronnitza Member	Discoidal fossil, probable junior synonym of Aspidella.	
Planomedusites	P. grandis	Bronnitza Member	Discoidal fossil, probable junior synonym of Aspidella.	
Pollukia	P. serebrina	Bronnitza Member	Discoidal fossil.	
Glaessneria	G. imperfecta	Bronnitza Member	Discoidal fossil.	
Marnium	M. cristatum	Bronnitza Member	Discoidal fossil with tentacles.	
Atakia	A. vermiformis	Bernashev Member	Highly enigmatic discoidal fossil, with a potential "worm-like" body attached. Potential synonym of Fustiglyphus.	
Zimniella	Zimniella sp.	Bernashev Member	Enigmatic fossil.	

=== Flora ===
Flora
Genus	Species	Localities	Notes	Images
Beltanelloides	B. sorichevae	Bernashev and Bronnitza Members	Cyanobacteria, nomen nudum and synonym of Beltanelliformis.	
Nemiana	N. simplex	Bernashev Member	Cyanobacteria, junior synonym of Beltanelliformis.	
Beltanelliformis	B. brunsae	Bernashev and Bronnitza Members	Cyanobacteria.	
Morania	M. zinkovi	Bernashev Member	Cyanobacteria, first described from this formation.	
Contextuopsis	Contextuopsis sp.; C. zonata	Lyadova and Zinkov Members	Filamentous cyanobacteria, first described from this formation.	
Volyniella	V. valdaica; V. jampolica	Lyadova and Zinkov Members	Filamentous cyanobacteria, with V. valdaica being first described from this formation.	
Podolina	Podolina sp.	Lyadova Member	Filamentous cyanobacteria.	
Leiothrichoides	L. gracilis; L. typicus	Lyadova and Bernashev Members	Filamentous cyanobacteria.	
Botuobia	B. wernadskii	Lyadova and Bernashev Members	Filamentous cyanobacteria.	
Ljadovia	L. exasperata; L. perforata	Lyadova and Zinkov Members	Filamentous cyanobacteria, first described from this formation.	
Striatella	S. coriacea	Lyadova and Zinkov Members	Filamentous cyanobacteria.	
Taenitrichoides	T. jaryschevicus	Lyadova Member	Filamentous cyanobacteria.	
Rogosoopsis	Rogosoopsis sp.	Zinkov Member	Filamentous cyanobacteria.	
Leiotrichoides	L. typicus		Filamentous cyanobacteria.	
Arctacellularia	A. doliiformis		Filamentous cyanobacteria.	
Palaeolyngbya	Palaeolyngbya sp.; P. catenata	Zinkov Member	Filamentous cyanobacteria.	
Polytrichoides	Polytrichoides sp.; P. lineatus		Filamentous cyanobacteria.	
Rudnjana	Rudnjana sp.		Filamentous cyanobacteria.	
Tubulosa	T. corrugata		Filamentous cyanobacteria.	
Obruchevella	O. parva		Filamentous cyanobacteria.	
Oscillatoriopsis	Oscillatoriopsis sp.		Filamentous cyanobacteria.	
Zinkovioides	Z. inclusis; Z. perforata	Bernashev and Zinkov Members	Filamentous cyanobacteria, first described from this formation.	
Eoholinia	E. fruticulosa	Bernashev, Bronnitza, and Zinkov Members	Macroalgae.	
Serebrina	S. crustacea	Lyadova and Bernashev Members	Encrusting algae.	
Chuaria	Chuaria sp.	Bernashev Member	Enigmatic fossil, possibly synonymous with Tawuia.	
Siphonophycus	Siphonophycus sp.	Bernashev and Zinkov Members	Filamenteous fossil.	

=== Acritarchs ===
Acritarchs
Genus	Species	Localities	Notes	Images
Leiosphaeridia	L. pruniformis; L. minutissima; L. tenuissima; L. effusa; L. jacutica; L. undulata; L. asapha; L. aperta	Lyadova, Bernashev, and Zinkov Members	Sphaeromorph acritarch.	
Symplassosphaeridium	Symplassosphaeridium sp.	Lyadova Member	Acritarch,	
Trematosphaeridium	T. holtedahlii		Sphaeromorph acritarch.	
Favososphaeridium	Favososphaeridium sp.		Sphaeromorph acritarch.	
Nucellosphaeridium	Nucellosphaeridium sp.		Sphaeromorph acritarch.	
Octaedryxium	Octaedryxium sp.	Bernashev Member	Acritarch.	
Origmatosphaeridium	O. rubiginosum	Bernashev Member	Acritarch.	
Tetraedrixium	Tetraedrixium sp.		Acritarch.	
Polycavita	Polycavita sp.; P. concentrica		Acritarch.	
Ostiana	O. microcystis	Bernashev Member	Acritarch.	
Tynnia	T. precambrica	Bernashev Member	Acritarch.	

=== Ichnogenera ===
Ichnogenera
Genus	Species	Localities	Notes	Images
Aviculaichnus	A. gureevi	Bronnitza Member	Movement traces, junior synonym of Nenoxites.	
Pseudohiemaloraichnus	P. podolica	Bronnitza Member	Movement traces, junior synonym of Nenoxites.	
Podoliina	P. crassa	Bronnitza Member	Movement traces, junior synonym of Nenoxites.	
Nenoxites	N. curvus	Bronnitza Member	Movement traces.	
Gordia	Gordia sp.	Bernashev Member	Burrows.	
Veprina feeding traces	Veprina cf. V. undosa	Bronnitza Member	Feeding traces of the genus Veprina.	

== See also ==
- Ediacaran biota
