= Ustʹ Pinega Formation =

Geological formation in northwestern Russia

- Stratigraphic range: Ediacaran 575–550 Ma
- Type: Geological Formation
- Sub-units: Tamitsa, Lyamtsa, Arkhangelsk, Verkhovka, Syuzma, Vaizitsa and Zimnegory Subformations
- Underlies: Mezen Formation
- Overlies: different Archean and Proterozoic rocks
- Thickness: >751 m

Lithology
- Primary: Argillite
- Other: Sandstone, Siltstone, Clay

Location
- Coordinates: 64°09′00″N 41°56′00″E
- Region: Arkhangelsk Oblast, Vologda Oblast, Kirov Oblast, Komi Republic, Republic of Karelia
- Country: Russia
- Extent: >970 km

Type section
- Named for: Ust-Pinega
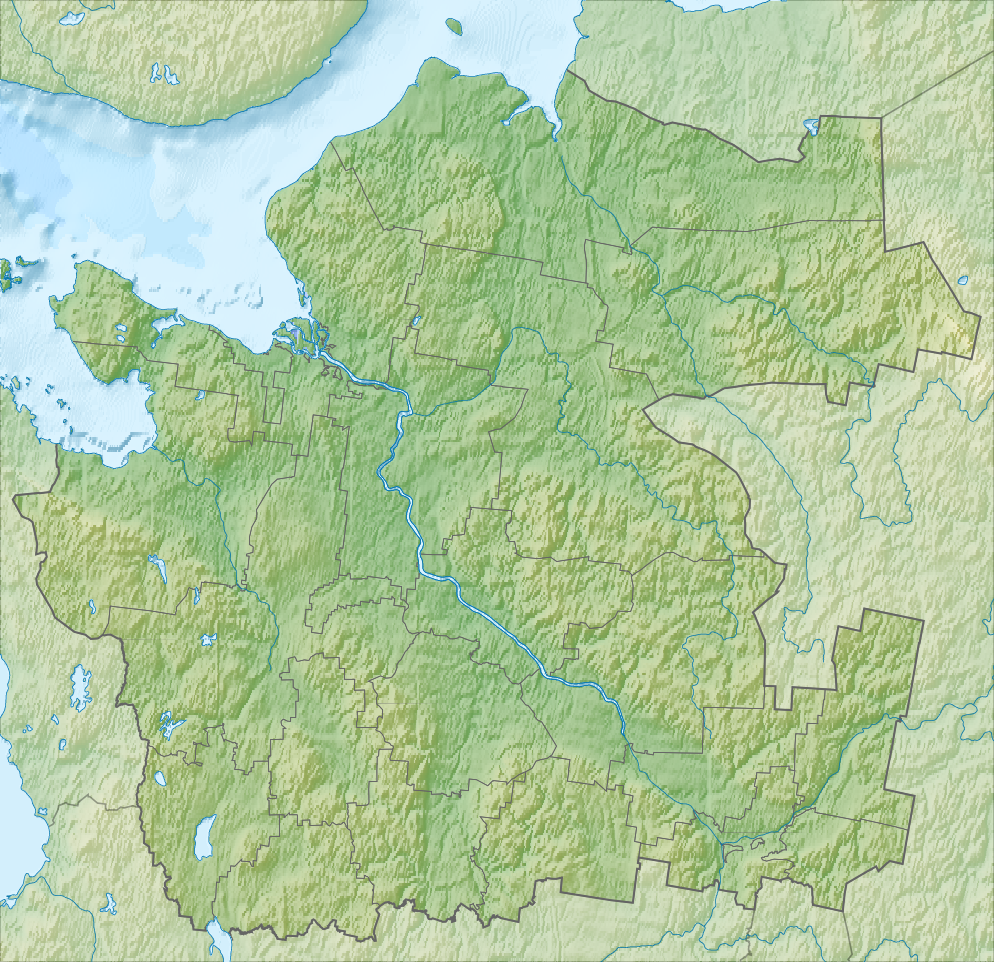
- Ustʹ Pinega Formation (Russia) Ustʹ Pinega Formation (Arkhangelsk Oblast)

The Ustʹ Pinega Formation is an Upper Ediacaran geological formation in northwestern Russia. It spans from around 575 Ma to 550 Ma and contains fossils of the Ediacaran biota throughout its sequence.

== Geology ==
The formation was first established and described from the core of the Ust-Pinega borehole drilled in the settlement of Ust-Pinega, Arkhangelsk Region of Russia, where its thickness is 284 m. Its natural outcrops within the same region are known from the Onega Peninsula and the Winter Coast of the White Sea, as well as from small, isolated outcrops in the basin of the Onega River and on the northern slope of the Vetreny Poyas (Windy Belt) Ridge.

The formation rests with erosion on Proterozoic terrigenous deposits or Archean crystalline rocks. It is subdivided, from bottom to top, into the following Subformations (initially defined as "Beds" by A.F. Stankovsky, 1985): Tamitsa, Lyamtsa, Arkhangelsk, Verkhovka, Syuzma, Vaizitsa, and Zimnegory. It is unconformably overlain by deposits of the Ediacaran Mezen Formation, as well as by Paleozoic or Quaternary sediments.

In 2003, D.V. Grazhdankin proposed an alternative subdivision scheme for these deposits, based on the original scheme by A.F. Stankovskiy. This scheme includes the Lyamtsa (= Lyamtsa + Arkhangelsk Beds), the Verkhovka (= Verkhovka + Syuzma Beds), and the Zimnegory (= Vaizitsa + Zimnegory Beds) Formations. In this revision, the use of the Ust' Pinega Formation was abandoned in favor of these three formations.

Currently, the Ust' Pinega Formation and its subformations remain the official stratigraphic scheme used on state geological maps of Russia.

== Dating ==
The Lyamtsa, Verkhovka and Vaizitsa Subformations contain volcanic ashes. Zircon U-Pb dating of volcanic tuffs from the Verkhovka and Vaizitsa beds has yielded ages of 557.28±0.14 Ma and 552.96±0.19 Ma, respectively. Furthermore, an Rb–Sr age of 565±9 Ma was obtained for clays of the Arkhangelsk Subformation. The formation is unconformably overlain by the deposits of the Mezen Formation, from the lower part of which a U-Pb age of 550.2±4.6 Ma has been obtained for tuffites.

== Paleobiota ==
The Ustʹ Pinega Formation is home to many rare and common Ediacaran fauna, from the well known motile forms such as Dickinsonia and Kimberella, to the rarer, more elusive forms like Ventogyrus and Zolotytsia. All forms within this formation are preserved in layers of ash beds, which are not only good at preserving the fine exterior details of organisms, but also their internals, like Burykhia.

Color key: Taxon / Reclassified taxon / Taxon falsely reported as present / Dubious taxon or junior synonym / Ichnotaxon / Ootaxon / Morphotaxon

Notes
Uncertain or tentative taxa are in small text
~~crossed out~~ taxa are discredited.

=== Proarticulata ===
Genus	Species	Notes	Images
Andiva	A. ivantsovi	Elongated oval motile organism.	
Archaeaspinus	A. fedonkini	Oval motile organism.	
Armillifera	A. parva	Elongated oval motile organism.	
Cephalonega	C. stepanovi	Oval motile organism.	
Cyanorus	C. singularis	Elongated motile organism.	
Dickinsonia	Dickinsonia sp.	Oval to elongated motile organism.	
Karakhtia	K. nessovi	Oval motile organism.	
Keretsa	K. brutoni	Elongated motile organism.	
Lossinia	L. lissetskii	Elongated motile organism.	
Ovatoscutum	O. concentricum	Rounded motile organism.	
Palaeoplatoda	P. segmentata	Elongated motile organism.	
Paravendia	P. janae	Elongated motile organism.	
Vendia	V. sokolovi; V. rachiata	Elongated motile organism.	
Yorgia	Y. waggoneri	Oval motile organism.	

=== Petalonamae ===
Genus	Species	Notes	Images
Bomakellia	B. kelleri	Sessile frondose organism.	
Charnia	Charnia sp.	Sessile frondose organism.	
Charniodiscus	Charniodiscus sp.	Sessile frondose organism.	
Pteridinium	Pteridinium sp.	Sessile frondose organism.	
Ramellina	R. pennata	Sessile frondose organism.	

=== Trilobozoan ===
Genus	Species	Notes	Images
Albumares	A. brunsae	Tri-radial organism.	
Anfesta	A. stankovskii	Tri-radial organism.	
Tribrachidium	T. heraldicum	Tri-radial organism.	

=== Cnidarian ===
Genus	Species	Notes	Images
Bonata	B. septata	Discoid organism.	
Brachina	Brachina sp.	Discoid organism.	
Ediacaria	Ediacaria sp.	Discoid organism.	
Eoporpita	E. medusa.	Discoid organism.	
Inaria	I. karli	Sac-like organism.	
Medusinites	Medusinites sp.	Discoid organism.	
Staurinidia	S. crucicula	Discoid organism.	
Tirasiana	Tirasiana sp.	Discoid organism.	
Zolotytsia	Z. biserialis	Deformed mass of ovals along a mid-line groove.	

=== Chordata ===
Genus	Species	Notes	Images
Burykhia	B. hunti	Sac-like organism, possible tunicate.	

=== Annelida ===
Genus	Species	Notes	Images
Calyptrina	C. striata	Tubular organism.	

=== incertae sedis ===
Genus	Species	Notes	Images
Cyclomedusa	Cyclomedusa sp.	Discoid organism.	
Hiemalora	Hiemalora sp.	Discoid organism, possibly holdfasts of petalonamids.	
Kimberella	Kimberella sp.	Egg-shaped organism, possible mollusc.	
Mawsonites	M. spriggi	Discoid organism.	
Nimbia	N. occlusa	Discoid organism.	
Orbisiana	Orbisiana sp.	Palaeopascichnid organism.	
Palaeopascichnus	Palaeopascichnus sp.	Palaeopascichnid organism.	
Parvancorina	P. sagitta	Anchor-shaped organism, possible mollusc or arthropod.	
Solza	S. margarita	Egg-shaped organism.	
Harlaniella	Harlaniella sp.	Ribbon-like organism.	
Vendotaenid	Vendotaenid	Ribbon-like organisms.	

=== Flora ===
Genus	Species	Notes	Images
Archyfasma	A. dimera; A. lamellata	Branching macroalgae.	
Beltanelliformis	Beltaneillformis sp.	Cyanobacterial colony.	
Eoholynia	E. fruticulosa	Branching macroalgae.	
Favosiphycus	F. wukii	Flattened thallus crust-like, consisting of densely packed cells.	
Gandvikia	G. caudata	Ribbon-shaped macroalgae.	
Mezenia	M. kossovoyi	Sausage shaped macroalgae.	
Serebrina	S. crustacea	Encrusting macroalgae.	

=== Ichnogenera ===
Genus	Species	Notes	Images
Epibaion	Epibaion sp.	Feeding traces of proarticulates.	
Kimberichnus	Kimberichnus sp.	Feeding traces of Kimberella.	
Nenoxites	Nenoxites sp.	Movement traces.	
Neonereites	Neonereites sp.	Burrows.	
Planolites	Planolites sp.	Burrows.	

== See also ==
- List of fossiliferous stratigraphic units in Russia
