= Mogilev Formation =

Geologic formation in Moldova and Ukraine

- Stratigraphic range: Late Ediacaran; ~575–556.62 Ma
- Type: Formation
- Unit of: Mogilev-Podolisk Group
- Sub-units: See: Members
- Underlies: Yarishev Formation
- Overlies: (Unconformably) Hrushka Formation
- Thickness: 17.3–21.0 m (56.8–68.9 ft)

Lithology
- Primary: Sandstones
- Other: Siltstone, Argillite, Gravel

Location
- Coordinates: 48°26.37′N 27°41.50′E
- Country: Moldova and Ukraine

Type section
- Named by: L.F. Lungersgauzen
- Year defined: 1939

The Mogilev Formation, sometimes spelt as Mohyliv or Mohylivska, is a late Ediacaran aged geologic formation in Moldova and Ukraine. Deposited sometime between 575 – 556.62±0.26 Ma, the Yarishev Formation is predominately composed of sandstone rocks. The formation is also fossiliferous in nature, containing various large macrofossils, and an abundance of microfossils.

== History of research ==
Prior to the 1960s, knowledge on the formations and fossils within the wider East European Platform were relatively unknown, save for the formal descriptions of the Mogilev and Ushitsa Formations in 1939 by L.F. Lungersgauzen, which were then regarded by Lungersgauzen as Cambrian and Ordovician respectively. With the onset of the 1960s, various studies were undertaken in order to compile a State geological map, which would see previously described formations such as the Mogilev Formation, and new formations, correlated to other Ediacaran formations in the wider region.

== Geology ==
The Mogilev Formation can be found outcropping near to the village of Mereșeuca in Ocnița District, Moldova, as well as by the Dniester River in Ukraine, where it is overlain by the argillites of the Yarishev Formation, whilst it is unconformably underlain by the basalts of the Hrushka Formation and a Paleoproterozoic aged crystalline basement, and is a part of the wider Mogilev-Podolisk Group. The formation itself is primarily composed of sandstones, and is split into three formally named members. The overall thickness of the formation ranges between 17.3–21.0 m (56.8–68.9 ft).

=== Members ===
The Mogilev Formation is split into three formal members, sometimes referred to as beds. These members are as follows, in ascending stratigraphic order (lowest to highest):

- Olchedaev Member: This member, sometimes referred to as the "Olchedaev Beds", is roughly 4.4–6.0 m (14.4–19.7 ft) thick, and is predominately composed of coarse-grained gravels, as well as very-fine- to very-coarse-grained, cross-bedded sandstones. There can also be found occasional intercalations of argillites and siltstones. Going from the base to the top of the member, the sizes of the grain decrease, and the colour of the rocks change from a grayish-pink to light-gray.
- Lomozov Member: This member, sometimes referred to as the "Lomozov/Lomosiv Beds", attains a thickness between 2.9–8.4 m (9.5–27.6 ft), and is primarily composed of dark blue-gray argillites, which is inter-bedded with thin layers of gray sandstones and siltstones.
- Yampol Member: This member, sometimes referred to as the "Yampol/Yampil Beds", ranges between 8.9–12.1 m (29–40 ft) in thickness, and is composed of white to light-gray, very-fine- to medium-grained clayey sandstones, in which coarse-grained sandstones and gravels sit on top.

The Lyadova Member was previously, and sometimes still is, regarded as being a part of the Mogilev Formation, although in more recent studies this has flipped back and forth to also being attributed to the overlying Yarishev Formation,

== Dating ==
The Mogilev Formation has been dated using U-Pb dating on zircon samples collected above in the Yarishev Formation, as well as the top of the formation itself. The dates yielded from these samples were 556.62±0.26 Ma and 557.12±0.41 Ma respectively, seeing the date of deposition for the top of the Mogilev Formation being between 557 - 556 Ma. The formation has also been correlated to the Kholonevychi Formation, which had its base dated using the U-Pb dating method on zircon samples, which yielded a date of 575±7 Ma.

== Paleoenvironment ==
The environment at the time of the Mogilev Formations deposition was likely that of a cold-water, shallow marine one, set within a basin with a calm, hydrodynamic regime. This has been inferred from the notable absence of carbonate sediments. This environment was likely maintained by the presence of local basement high-islands, as well as submerged shales, all of which would have brought around conditions fit for colonisation of the seafloor by early metazoans.

== Paleobiota ==
The Mogilev Formation is home to a wide variety of Ediacaran macrofossils, from discoidal forms such as Cyclomedusa and Nimbia, to proarticulates like Dickinsonia and Podolimirus. There can also be found a range of cyanobacterial forms and microfossils, such as Volyniella and Stictosphaeridium respectively. Most fossils are restricted to the Lomozov Member, although some can be found higher up in the Yampol Member.

Color key: Taxon / Reclassified taxon / Taxon falsely reported as present / Dubious taxon or junior synonym / Ichnotaxon / Ootaxon / Morphotaxon

Notes
Uncertain or tentative taxa are in small text
~~crossed out~~ taxa are discredited.

=== Tunicates ===
Tunicates
Genus	Species	Localities	Notes	Image
Pharyngomorpha	P. reticulata	Lomozov Member	Ascidian tunicate. Fossils were first found from this formation prior to their formal description, where they were noted to bear similarities to Ausia and Gibbavasis.	
Finkoella	F. ukrainica; F. oblonga	Lomozov and Yampol Members	Ascidian tunicate.	

=== Petalonamae ===
Petalonamae
Genus	Species	Localities	Notes	Images
Arborea	A. spinosa; A. opposita	Lomozov Member	Arboreomorph petalonamid, previously recorded as Charniodiscus spinosus and C. oppositus.	
Charniodiscus	C. planus	Lomozov Member	Arboreomorph petalonamid.	
Pteridinium	P. carolinaensis	Lomozov Member	Pteridinid petalonamid. Previously reported as Pteridinium nenoxa.	
Lomosovis	L. malus	Lomozov Member	Petalonamid of unknown affinities.	
Valdainia	V. plumosa	Lomozov Member	Pteridinid petalonamid. Later synonmised with Podolimirus.	

=== Proarticulata ===
Proarticulata
Genus	Species	Localities	Notes	Images
Dickinsonia	D. costata; Dickinsonia cf. D. tenius	Lomozov Member	Dickinsoniid proarticulates.	
Podolimirus	P. mirus	Lomozov Member	Cephalozoan proarticulate.	
Yorgia	Y. waggoneri	Lomozov Member	Yorgiid proarticulate.	
Spriggina (?)	S. (?) borealis	Lomozov Member	A proarticulate fossil, which bears similarities to "Spriggina" borealis", although poor preservation precludes a confident assignment.	

=== Trilobozoa ===
Trilobozoa
Genus	Species	Localities	Notes	Images
Tribrachidium	T. heraldicum	Lomozov Member	Tribrachidid trilobozoan.	

=== Porifera ===
Porifera
Genus	Species	Localities	Notes	Images
Vaveliksia	V. velikanovi; V. svetozarovae	Lomozov and Yampol Members	Olgunid sponges, first described from this formation.	

=== incertae sedis ===
incertae sedis
Genus	Species	Localities	Notes	Images
Kimberella	K. quadrata	Lomozov Member	Egg-shaped mollusca-like organism.	
Palaeopascichnus	P. delicatus	Lomozov and Yampol Members	Palaeopascichnid organism.	
Conomedusites	Conomedusites cf. C. lobatus	Lomozov Member	Tetra-radial fossil.	
Nilpenia	N. rossi	Lomozov Member	Branching fossil.	
Pseudorhizostomites	P. howchini	Lomozov Member	Problematic biogenic structure.	
Elasenia	E. aseevae	Lomozov Member	Discoidal fossil.	
Hiemalora	H. stellaris	Lomozov and Yampol Members	Discoidal fossil with tentacles.	
Nimbia	N. occlusa; N. dniesteri	Lomozov and Yampol Members	Discoidal fossil.	
Protodipleurosoma	P. rugulosa	Lomozov and Yampol Members	Discoidal fossil.	
Sekwia	S. kaptarenkoe		Discoidal fossil.	
Cyclomedusa	C. plana; Cyclomedusa cf. C. davidsii	Lomozov Member	Discoidal fossil, probable junior synonym of Aspidella.	
Paliella	P. patelliformis	Lomozov Member	Discoidal fossil.	
Ediacaria	Ediacaria sp.; E. flindersi	Lomozov Member	Discoidal fossil, probable junior synonym of Aspidella.	
Irridinitus	I. multiradiatus	Lomozov Member	Discoidal fossil.	
Medusinites	M. asteroides	Lomozov Member	Discoidal fossil, probable junior synonym of Aspidella.	
Tirasiana	T. discformis	Lomozov and Yampol Members	Discoidal fossil, probable junior synonym of Aspidella.	
Vendella	V. sokolovi	Lomozov Member	Discoidal fossil, probable junior synonym of Aspidella.	
Planomedusites	P. grandis	Lomozov Member	Discoidal fossil, probable junior synonym of Aspidella.	
Bessarabia	B. bukatchuki	Lomozov Member	Discoidal fossil.	
Glaessneria	G. imperfecta	Yampol Member	Discoidal fossil.	
Jampolium	J. wyrzhykoowskii	Yampol Member	Discoidal fossil.	

=== Flora ===
Flora
Genus	Species	Localities	Notes	Images
Beltanelloides	B. sorichevae	Lomozov and Yampol Members	Cyanobacteria, nomen nudum and synonym of Beltanelliformis.	
Nemiana	N. simplex	Lomozov and Yampol Members	Cyanobacteria, junior synonym of Beltanelliformis.	
Beltanelliformis	B. brunsae	Lomozov and Yampol Members	Cyanobacteria.	
Volyniella	V. valdaica; V. jampolica	Yampol Member	Filamentous cyanobacteria, with V. valdaica being first described from this formation.	
Trachythrichoides	T. ovalis	Lomozov Member	Filamentous cyanobacteria.	
Siphonophycus	Siphonophycus sp.		Filamenteous fossil.	

=== Acritarchs ===
Acritarchs
Genus	Species	Localities	Notes	Images
Stictosphaeridium	S. sinapticuliferum		Acritarch.	
Stratimorphis	S. plana	Lomozov Member	Acritarch.	
Polycavita	P. concentrica; P. bullata	Lomozov Member	Acritarch.	

=== Ichnogenera ===
Ichnogenera
Genus	Species	Localities	Notes	Images
Bergaueria	Bergaueria sp.		Resting trace of cnidarians.	
Cochlichnus	Cochlichnus sp.		Burrows.	
Astropolichnus	Astropolichnus sp.	Lomozov Member	Resting place.	
Astropolichnus	Astropolichnus sp.	Lomozov Member	Resting place.	
Planolites	Planolites sp.	Lomozov Member	Burrow.	
Helmintoidichnites	Helmintoidichnites sp.	Lomozov Member	Resting place.	
Treptichnus	Treptichnus sp.	Lomozov Member	Resting place.	
Nenoxites	Nenoxites sp.	Lomozov Member	Resting place.	

== See also ==
- Ediacaran biota
