= Nagoriany Formation =

Geologic formation in Moldova and Ukraine

- Stratigraphic range: Late Ediacaran; ~552.82–551.2 Ma
- Type: Formation
- Unit of: Mogilev-Podolisk Group
- Sub-units: See: Members
- Underlies: (Unconformably) Danilov Formation
- Overlies: (Unconformably) Yarishev Formation
- Thickness: 62.0–185.5 m (203.4–608.6 ft)

Lithology
- Primary: Argillites
- Other: Siltstone, Sandstone, Tuffite

Location
- Coordinates: 48°26.37′N 27°41.50′E
- Country: Moldova and Ukraine

The Nagoriany Formation, sometimes spelt as Nagoryany or Nagoryanska, is a late Ediacaran aged geologic formation in Moldova and Ukraine. Deposited sometime between 552.82 – 551.2±4.2 Ma, the Nagoriany Formation is predominately composed of argillite rocks. The formation is also fossiliferous in nature, containing an abundance of Miaohe-type fossils.

== Geology ==
The Nagoriany Formation can be found outcropping near to the village of Mereșeuca in Ocnița District, Moldova, as well as by the Dniester River in Ukraine, where it is unconformably overlain by the sandstones of the Danilov Formation, whilst it is unconformably underlain by the argillites of the Yarishev Formation, and it is a part of the wider Mogilev-Podolisk Group. The formation itself is predominately composed of argillites, and is split into four formally named members. The overall thickness of the formation ranges from 62.0 m (203.4 ft) it northern outcrops, and up to 185.5 m (609 ft) in its southern outcrops.

=== Members ===
A phosphorite concretion from the Nagoriany Formation

The Nagoriany Formation is split into four formal members, with two only appearing towards the south. Sometimes referred to as beds, these members are as follows, in ascending stratigraphic order (lowest to highest):

- Dzhurdzhev Member: This member, sometimes referred to as the "Dzhurzhivka Beds", is roughly 10.0–17.7 m (32.8–58.1 ft) thick, and is predominately composed of gray to light-gray, fine- to coarse-grained sandstone layers, which are commonly separated by layers of argillites and siltstones.
- Kalius Member: This member, sometimes referred to as the "Kalyus Beds", ranges between 18.2–87.0 m (59.7–285.4 ft) in thickness in the north, whilst it extends beyond 100 m (330 ft) towards the south. It is primarily composed of uniform, dark-gray to black, organic rich argillites, of which contain carbonate mounds of cone-in-cone structures and phosphorite concretions. The rocks of the Kalius Member are suggested to potentially be source rocks.
- Sălcuța Member: This member, sometimes referred to as the "Sălcuța Beds", ranges between 14.5–28.0 m (47.6–91.9 ft) in thickness, and is composed of alternating dark-gray to black argillite and siltstone layers, which are intercalated with layers of gray, very fine- to fine-grained sandstones. This member can also only be found in the south.
- Lunguța Member: This member, sometimes referred to as the "Lunguța Beds", attains a thickness of 33.5 m (110 ft) and is predominately composed of inter-bedded gray to black argillites, siltstones, and sandstones, of which are occasionally intercalated with thin layers of tuffitic rocks. This member can also only be found in the south.

== Dating ==
The Nagoriany Formation has been dated using U-Pb dating on zircon samples collected from the Kalius Member. These samples would yield a date of 551.2±4.2 Ma. Using various fossils collected from the formation also, it would be placed within the Miaohe cluster, seeing it roughly dated to between 552.82 - 551.2 Ma.

== Paleoenvironment ==
The environment at the time of the Nagoriany Formations deposition was likely that of a low-energy, inner-shelf environment, similar to formations found from the Nama Group.

== Paleobiota ==
The Nagoriany Formation contains an abundance of foral fossils, ranging from cyanobacteria such as Beltanelliformis and Oscillatoriopsis, to macroalgae such as Vendotaenia and Eoholynia, the latter of which was described from this formation. There can also be found throughout various acritarchs and enigmatic fossils, such as Leiosphaeridia and Wutubus respectively. Alongside this, it also contains an example of a probable tunicate, in the form of Pharyngomorpha, the fossils of which were recovered from this formation prior to its formal description and naming.

Color key: Taxon / Reclassified taxon / Taxon falsely reported as present / Dubious taxon or junior synonym / Ichnotaxon / Ootaxon / Morphotaxon

Notes
Uncertain or tentative taxa are in small text
~~crossed out~~ taxa are discredited.

=== Tunicates ===
Tunicates
Genus	Species	Notes	Image
Pharyngomorpha	P. reticulata	Ascidian tunicate. Fossils were first found from this formation prior to their formal description, where they were noted to bear similarities to Ausia and Gibbavasis.	

=== incertae sedis ===
incertae sedis
Genus	Species	Notes	Images
Attenborites	A. janeae	Oval-shaped fossil	
Nimbia	N. paula	Discoidal fossil	
Wutubus	W. annularis	Tubular fossil	
Harlaniella	H. podolica	Ribbon-like fossil.	

=== Flora ===
Flora
Genus	Species	Notes	Images
Beltanelloides	B. sorichevae	Cyanobacteria, nomen nudum and synonym of Beltanelliformis.	
Nemiana	N. simplex	Cyanobacteria, junior synonym of Beltanelliformis.	
Beltanelliformis	B. brunsae	Cyanobacteria.	
Bicuspidata	B. fusiformis	Cyanobacteria.	
Oscillatoriopsis	Oscillatoriopsis sp.	Cyanobacteria.	
Pomoria	P. rhomboidalis	Cyanobacteria.	
Eoholinia	E. capillaria; E. longa	Macroalgae.	
Kalusina	K. compacta	Filamenteous macroalgae.	
Pilitela	P. composita	Bush-shaped macroalgae.	
Vendotaenia	V antiqua	Ribbon-like macroalgae.	
Eoholynia	E. longa; E. fruticulosa	Branching macroalgae, first described from this formation.	
Zinkovioides	Z. inclusis; Z. perforata	Filamentous cyanobacteria, first described from this formation.	
Ljadovia	L. exasperata	Filamentous cyanobacteria, first described from this formation.	
Leiotrichoides	L. gracilis	Filamentous cyanobacteria.	
Oscillatorites	O. wernadskii	Filamentous cyanobacteria.	
Siphonophycus	Siphonophycus sp.	Filamentous fossil.	
Vanavarataenia	V. insolita	Fungus-like fossil.	
Chuaria	C. circularis	Enigmatic fossil, possibly synonymous with Tawuia.	
Serebrina	S. crustacea	Encrusting algae.	

=== Microorganisms ===
Microorganisms
Genus	Species	Notes	Image
Leiosphaeridia	L. crassa; L. minutissima; L. tenuissima; L. jacutica	Acritarch fossils.	
Trachysphaeridium	T. partiale; T. magnum; T. bavlense	Acritarch fossils.	
Nucellosphaeridium	Nucellosphaeridium sp.	Acritarch fossils.	
Pterospermopsimorpha	P. insolita	Acritarch fossil.	
Navifusa	Navifusa sp.	Acritarch fossil.	

=== Ichnogenera ===
Ichnogenera
Genus	Species	Notes	Images
Bergaueria	B. hemispherica	Resting trace of cnidarians.	

== See also ==
- Ediacaran biota
