= Stáhpogieddi Formation =

Geologic formation in Norway

- Stratigraphic range: late Ediacaran - Cambrian 560–530 Ma
- Type: Formation
- Unit of: Vestertana Group
- Sub-units: Manndrapselva, Indreelva and Lillevannet Members
- Underlies: Breidvika Formation
- Overlies: Mortensnes Formation
- Thickness: 505–530 metres (1,657–1,739 ft)

Lithology
- Primary: Sandstone
- Other: Shale, Conglomerate, Quartzite, Mudstone, Greywacke

Location
- Country: Norway

The Stáhpogieddi Formation, sometimes spelled as Stappogiedde Formation, is a geologic formation in Norway, which spans from the late Ediacaran into the early Cambrian, and also preserves fossils dated to the Ediacaran period.

== Geology ==
The Stáhpogieddi Formation consists of three members, which are as follows, in ascending stratigraphic order (lowest to highest):

=== Members ===
- Lillevannet Member: This member is the oldest member of this formation, and is also the smallest, only being 40 metres (130 ft) at its thickest. It mainly consists of a quartz conglomerate, which are overlain by medium-grained, gray sandstones and siltstones. The depositional environment has been inferred to be fluvial to shallow-marine in nature.
- Indreelva Member; This member is the middle member of this formation, and is the largest member in terms of thickness, coming in at around 275–300 metres (902–984 ft) thick. Near the base of this member, it mainly consists of green to red shales, which contain occasional interbedded fine-grained, red sandstones. Towards and into the middle, the shales become a more greenish-grey colour, with fine-grained cross-laminated sandstones. At the top of the member, the fine-grained sandstones give way to much thicker interbedded medium to coarse, parallel-laminated sandstone. In exposed areas, the sandstone features rippled tops, and their orientation suggest a southwestern palaeocurrent at the time of deposition. In non-exposed areas, this layer is overlain by a top-most layer of greenish-grey, parallel-laminated siltstones, which are interbedded with fine-grained, ripple-marked sandstone. This is also the main fossiliferous member of the whole formation, containing a wide range of discoidal forms, and was likely deposited in deep-marine environment.
- Manndrapselva Member: This member is the youngest member of this formation, and is roughly 190 metres (620 ft) at its thickest, and mainly consists of coarse-grained, red quartzite sandstones and conglomerate, which is interbedded with greywacke and mudstone. The lower strata of this member contains occasional Ichnotaxon, which have been noted to be similar to Planolites, and also contains the agglutinated organism, Palaeopascichnus, all deposited in a shallow- to marginal-marine environment. This member also sits on the Ediacaran-Cambrian boundary.

== Dating ==
Using Rubidium–strontium dating on samples collected within the Stáhpogieddi Formation and other formations within the area, a minimum age of 530±0 Ma had been recovered from samples collected at the top of the formation, dating part of the Manndrapselva member to within the early Cambrian period, and is inline with previous Rb-Sr dating studies. The maximum age of 560±0 Ma had been recovered from the base of the formation, reaffirming assumptions that the majority of the formation is Ediacaran in age.

== Paleobiota ==
The Stáhpogieddi Formation contains a myriad of discoidal forms, from Cyclomedusa being the most common form, to others like Ediacaria and Nimbia occlusa. Alongside this, occasional frondose fossils, such as Charnia, are also found within the formation, as well as a collection of organic-walled microfossils and tubular fossils.

Color key: Taxon / Reclassified taxon / Taxon falsely reported as present / Dubious taxon or junior synonym / Ichnotaxon / Ootaxon / Morphotaxon	Notes; Uncertain or tentative taxa are in small text; ~~crossed out~~ taxa are discredited.

=== Petalonamae ===
Genus	Species	Locality	Notes	Images
Charnia	Charnia sp.	Indreelva Member	Frondose organism. Two distinct fossils are known, referred to as the "Blåberget" Charnia and "Kommagnes" Charnia.	
Swartpuntia (?)	Swartpuntia (?) sp.	Indreelva Member	Frondose organism. Tentatively assigned to Swartpuntia, although some researchers think this is unlikely.	

=== Cnidarian ===
Genus	Species	Locality	Notes	Images
Ediacaria (?)	Ediacaria(?) sp.	Indreelva Member	Discoid organism, tentative assignment.	

=== incertae sedis ===
Genus	Species	Locality	Notes	Images
Anulitubus	A. formosus	Indreelva Member	Tubular organism.	
Coniculus	C. elegantis	Indreelva Member	Tubular organism.	
Silicofistula	S. crenulata	Indreelva Member	Tubular organism. Previously referred to as Fistula, although the generic name had already been used by Moerch, (1853) for an extant mollusk, as such the new correct name Silicofistula was made.	
Aspidella	Aspidella sp.	Indreelva Member	Discoid organism.	
Cyclomedusa	Cyclomedusa sp.	Indreelva Member	Discoid organism.	
Hiemalora	Hiemalora sp.	Indreelva Member	Discoid organism, possibly holdfasts of petalonamids.	
Nimbia (?)	N. occlusa (?)	Indreelva Member	Discoid organism, tentative assignment.	
Palaeopascichnus	P. linearis; P. delicatus; P. gracilis	Lillevannet - Indreelva Transition, and Manndrapselva Member	Palaeopascichnid organism.	
Intrites	I. punctatus	Manndrapselva Member	Palaeopascichnid organism.	
Vendotaenia	V. antiqua; Vendotaenia sp.	Indreelva Member	Ribbon-like organisms.	
Harlaniella	H. podolica	Manndrapselva Member	Segmented, ribbon-like organisms.	

=== Flora ===
Genus	Species	Locality	Notes	Images
Beltanella	Beltanella sp.	Indreelva Member	Cyanobacterial colony, now a junior synonym of Beltanelliformis.	
Beltanelliformis	Beltanelliformis sp.	Indreelva Member	Cyanobacterial colony.	

=== Microfossils ===
Genus	Species	Locality	Notes	Images
Lagoenaforma	L. collaris	Indreelva Member	Organic-walled microfossils.	
Granomarginata	G. prima; G. squamacea	Indreelva Member	Acritarch.	
Symplassosphaeridium	Symplassosphaeridium sp.	Indreelva Member	Acritarch.	
Leiosphaeridia	L. crassa; L. jacutica	Indreelva Member	Leiosphaerid Acritarch.	
Leiosphaerid	Leiosphaerid	Indreelva Member	Leiosphaerid with a large opening.	
Sphaeromorph	Sphaeromorph	Indreelva Member	Sphaeromorph with a broken vesicle.	

=== Ichnogenera ===
Genus	Species	Locality	Notes	Images
Arenicolites	Arenicolites sp.	Indreelva Member	Burrows.	
Planolites-like trace fossils	???	Manndrapselva Member	Burrows and trace fossils similar to the ichnotaxon Planolites.	
Skolithos	Skolithos sp.	Indreelva Member	Burrows.	
Gordia	Gordia sp.	Manndrapselva Member	Burrows.	
Cochlichnus	Cochlichnus sp.	Manndrapselva Member	Burrows.	
Helicolithus	Helicolithus sp.	Manndrapselva Member	Burrows.	
Belorhaphe	Belorhaphe sp.	Manndrapselva Member	Burrows.	
Curvolithus	Curvolithus sp.	Manndrapselva Member	Burrows.	

=== Undescribed ===
Genus	Species	Locality	Notes	Images
Candidate frond	???	Indreelva Member	Frondose fossil, potentially a member of the arboreomorph, although poor preservation precludes proper identification.	
TSGF 18953	???	Indreelva Member	Frondose, dumbbell shaped fossil, bears similarities to Primocandelabrum, although poor preservation precludes proper identification.	
Form C	???	Indreelva Member	Organic-walled microfossil.	

== See also ==
- List of fossiliferous stratigraphic units in Norway
