= Twitya Formation =

Stratigraphic Unit in Northwest Territories, Canada

- Stratigraphic range: Cryogenian 662.4 Ma
- Type: Formation
- Unit of: Hay Creek Group
- Underlies: Keele Formation
- Overlies: Shezal Formation
- Thickness: 900 m (2,952 ft)

Lithology
- Primary: Limestone
- Other: Mudstone, Siltstone, Shale, Sandstone

Location
- Coordinates: 64.043°N 128.833°W
- Region: Northwest Territories
- Country: Canada

Type section
- Named for: Twitya River
- Twitya Formation (Northwest Territories)

The Twitya Formation is a geologic formation in Canada’s Northwest Territories. It preserves fossils dating back to the Cryogenian period.

== Geology ==
At the base of the Twitya Formation, it is primarily composed of thin-bedded limestone rocks, which contains finely laminated mudstone and siltstone. Above this, it then turns into pyritic black shale, and then into grayish-green siltstone and sandstone turbidites.

It is overlain by the siliciclastic and carbonate Keele Formation, and is underlain by the Shezal Formation of the Rapitan Group.

== Dating ==
The Twitya Formation was previously considered to be Ediacaran in age, although a later studies found this to not be the case, with one study using a combination of combination of Re-Os geochronology and Os-Sr isotope dating at the base of the Twitya Formation, and recovering a date of 662±3 Ma, placing the formation within the late Cryogenian, and near the end of the Sturtian glaciation.

== Paleobiota ==
The Twitya Formation contains a small selection of discoidal and annunli forms, namely tentative records of Irridinitus and Vendella. For a long time, these fossils were considered to be the oldest know probable animals, although many studies done since have recovered older probable remains. Nimbia was previously recorded from this formation, although later studies discounted these records, instead noting the fossils may be simple microbial colonies.

Color key
Taxon	Reclassified taxon	Taxon falsely reported as present	Dubious taxon or junior synonym	Ichnotaxon	Ootaxon	Morphotaxon

Notes
Uncertain or tentative taxa are in small text; ~~crossed out~~ taxa are discredited.

=== incertae sedis ===
Genus	Species	Notes	Images
~~Nimbia~~	~~N. occlusa~~	Discoid organism. Later discounted as simple microbial colonies.	
Irridinitus (?)	Irridinitus (?) sp.	Discoid organism, tentative assignment.	
Vendella (?)	Vendella (?) sp.	Discoid organism, tentative assignment. It is noted that it may be a junior synonym of Beltanelliformis.	

=== Flora ===
Genus	Species	Notes	Images
Morania	Morania sp.	Carbonaceous cyanobacteria.	
Beltina	Beltina sp.	Carbonaceous cyanobacteria.	
Filamentous microfossils	???	Too poorly preserved for taxonomic assignment.	

=== Microorganisms ===
Genus	Species	Notes	Images
Leiosphaeridia	Leiosphaeridia sp.	Acritarch.	

== See also ==
- List of fossiliferous stratigraphic units in Northwest Territories
