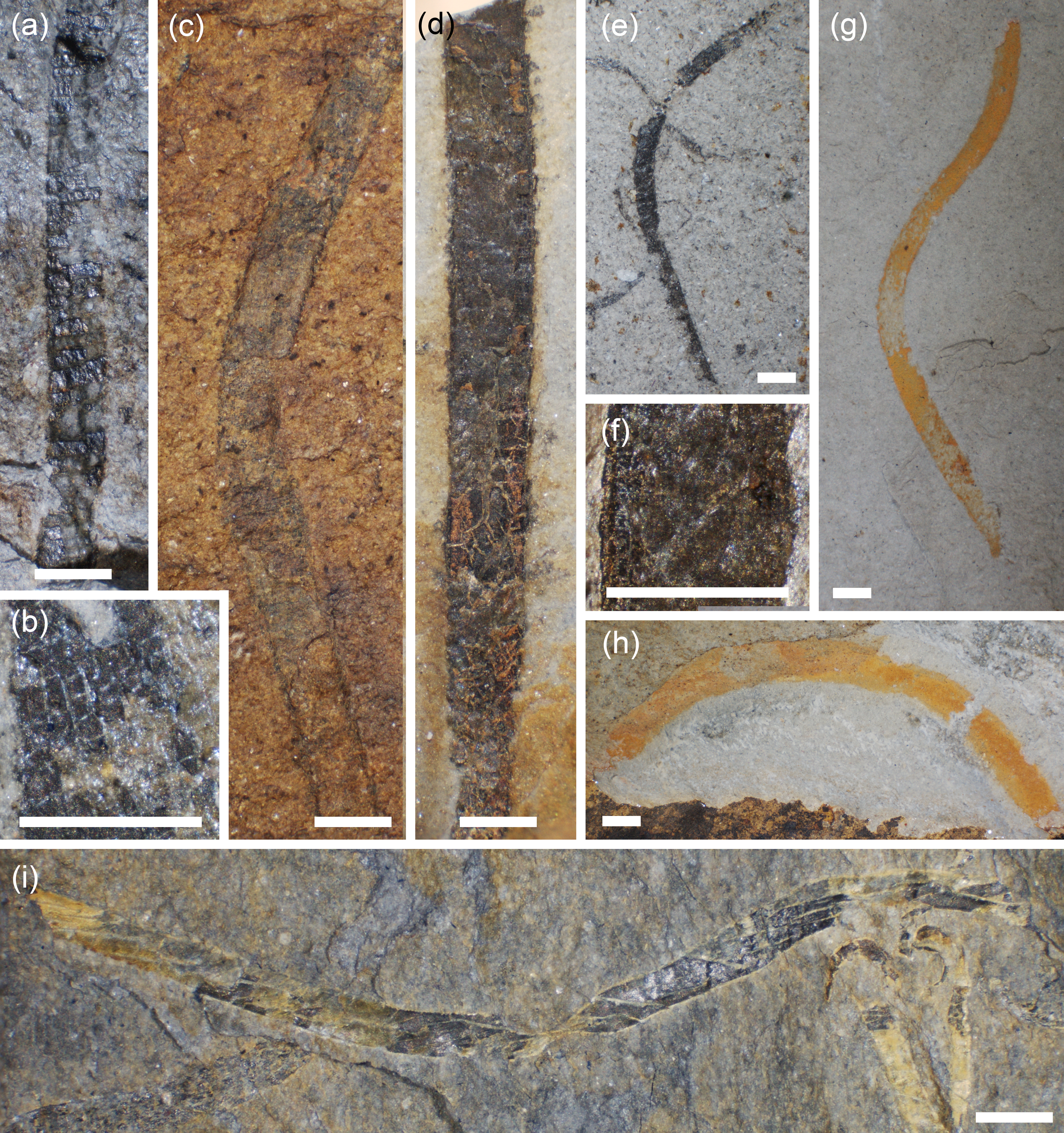
- Various specimens of Sabellidites from the Digermulen Peninsula

Scientific classification
- Kingdom: Animalia
- Phylum: Annelida
- Order: †Sabelliditida
- Family: †Sabelliditidae
- Genus: †Sabellidites; Yanichevsky, 1926

Type species
- †Sabellidites cambriensis Yanichevsky, 1926

Species
- S. cambriensis, Yanichevsky, 1926; S. badaowanensis, Luo et Zhang, 1986; S. yunnanensis, Luo et Zhang 1986

= Sabellidites =

Sabellidites Temporal range: Late Ediacaran - Early Cambrian, 560–530 Ma

Genus of annelid worms

Sabellidites is a genus of annelid from the Late Ediacaran and Early Cambrian periods. It is among the oldest annelid body fossils.

== Discovery ==
The holotype material of Sabellidites was discovered in the "Blue Clays" of the Lontova Formation, near Saint Petersburg in 1921, and named in 1926.

== Description ==
Sabellidites is a non-mineralised tubular organism, with a length of up to 160 mm (6.3 in) and a tube diameter of 3 mm (0.1 in), and are usually found compressed or three-dimensional, with no holdfast structure. There is transverse wrinkling along the full length of the body, and the body itself is flexible, with fossil specimens being found preserved either straight or curved. The walls of the tube consist of five layers, all inferred to be made from chitin.

== Affinities ==
Since naming, the affinity of Sabellidites has not been fully resolved, first being described as a sessile polychaete worm in 1926, in 1965 as a "pogonophoran", now Siboglinidae, due to the general morphology of the fossils and then assumed chitinous composition of the tube walls. Although tests done in 1977 and 1983 showed in inconclusive results due to the relatively poor preservation of certain features. Further studies done afterwards had not been able to confirm the affinities of Sabellidities, although in 2014 a comprehensive study was done on new and old fossil material and found it to be consistent with extant siboglinids.

== Distribution ==
Sabellidites can be found from the Stáhpogieddi and Breidvika Formations in Norway, as well as Russia, Newfoundland, Siberia, China, Australia and Spain. Due to this range, Sabellidites has been established as an index fossil for the lower Cambrian, being commonly found in association with other index fossils and ichnotaxon such as Treptichnus pedum, Granomarginata and Asteridium.
