= Intsy =

Rural locality in Arkhangelsk Oblast, Russia

Coordinates: 65°58′N 40°42′E

Intsy (Russian: Инцы) is a rural locality (a village) in Mezensky District of Arkhangelsk Oblast, Russia, located along the northern end of the Winter Coast and at the White Sea Throat. As of the 2010 Census, its population was 1 person.

The main occupation is fishing. In 1913, the village had a population of 59.
