= Ramellina =

Ramellina Temporal range: Ediacaran 553 Ma

Scientific classification
- Kingdom: Animalia
- Phylum: †Petalonamae
- Class: †incertae sedis
- Genus: †Ramellina; Fedonkin, 1980
- Species: †R. pennata

Binomial name
- †Ramellina pennata Fedonkin, 1980

Extinct genus of marine invertebrates

Ramellina is a fossil from the Ediacaran of the Ust' Pinega Formation of Russia. The fossil has a leaf-like shape with short ridges, and lateral rollers. It is a monotypic genus, containing only Ramellina pennata.

== Discovery ==
Ramellina was discovered in the uppermost part of the Verkhovka Subformation, Ustʹ Pinega Formation, on the Winter Coast (Zimnii Bereg) of the White Sea, Northwestern Russia, and described in 1980. It was found several meters below a volcanic ash bed with a U-Pb date of 552.96 ± 0.19 Ma.

== Etymology ==
The generic name Ramellina derives from the Latin word ramulus, to mean "little branch". The specific name pennata also derives from the Latin word pennatus, to mean "feathery".

== Description ==
Ramellina is a leaf shaped organism, and is between 20–35 mm (0.8–1.4 in) in length. The shape is due to the secondary polyps on either side of the midline are at their shortest length at the ends of the body, and are at their full length in the middle which is up to 4.5–6 mm (0.2–0.2 in), and number about 20. One end is smoothly rounded whilst the other end is pointed, where the polyps are notably thinner, which may show the growth region of Ramellina.

== Affinities ==
Originally described by M. Fedonkin in 1980 as a feather-like colony of polyps with unclear systematic affinity, similar to some colonial members of Hydrozoa and Anthozoa, Ramellina was later included by him in 1985 into the phylum Petalonamae, which unites Ediacaran frondose organisms.

== See also ==
- List of Ediacaran genera
