= Nimbia =

Nimbia may refer to:

- Nimbia (genus), a form of discoidal Neoproterozoic fossils
- The Nimbia dialect of the Gwandara language
