= Pomoria (disambiguation) =

Pomoria may refer to:

- Pomoria Fedonkin, 1980, A poorly preserved specimen of Tribrachidium which was found off the coast of The White Sea and originally described as a "sea anemone-like organism".
- Pomoria Sivertzeva et Jankauskas, 1989, a genus of Ediacaran microfossils of cyanobacterial trichome. Only one species, Pomoria rhomboidalis, has been described.
