= Veprina =

Veprina Temporal range: Ediacaran, 558–553 Ma
- A photo of the Veprina fossil, photo taken by Fedonkin, 1980

Scientific classification
- Kingdom: Animalia
- Phylum: Cnidaria
- Genus: †Veprina; Fedonkin, 1980
- Species: †V. undosa

Binomial name
- †Veprina undosa Fedonkin, 1980

Extinct genus of cnidarians

Veprina is a rare Ediacaran coelenterate cnidarian found on the Zimny coast of the White Sea, Russia and was first described by Mikhail Fedonkin in 1980.

== Diversity ==
Veprina is a monotypic genus, with its only species being V. undosa. One trace fossil is attributed to the species.

== Description ==
Veprina has an oval-shaped body, with a diameter up to 60mm in width, and consists of an outer and inner ribbed zone. The inner zone consist of ridges that may or may not have been tentacles. An elongated central depression of the body can be seen, which probably imparts a bilateral character, which possibly corresponds to the oral aperture.

== Discovery ==
Veprina was discovered on the Zimny coast of the White Sea, Russia and was described by Mikhail A. Fedonkin in 1980.

== Distribution ==
Besides being found in the White Sea, a trace fossil of Veprina was also found in the Yarishev Formation on the Derlo River bank, Mogilev – Podolsky, Ukraine. The fossil has been described as feeding and locomotion traces of Veprina.

== Ecology ==
Having only one complete fossil specimen discovered, this makes interpretations of the ecology of the animal difficult to interpret. The trace fossil discovered in Ukraine suggests that the animal itself was capable of locomotion and was probably an active feeder.

== See also ==
- List of Ediacaran genera
