= Atakia =

Atakia Temporal range: 571–551 Ma

Scientific classification
- Kingdom: Animalia
- Genus: Atakia

Type species
- Atakia vermiformis

Genus of Ediacaran fauna

Atakia is a genus of animals that were members of the Ediacaran fauna, which existed from 635 to 541 million years ago. Discovered in Ukraine in 1979 by Palij, the genus Atakia are soft-bodied Metazoan cast in Vendian sediments found on the Eastern European Platform formations. Oftentimes the genus Atakia is used as a comparison to other genera, because very little information is known about this genus. There is a discontinuity in identification because the genus Fustiglyphus Vialov is debated to be the same as Atakia but found in different regions.

== Morphology, anatomy, and behavior ==
There is little information on the morphology, anatomy, and behavior on the genus Atakia, but there is a suggestion that Fustiglyphus may be misidentified to be Atakia. The two genera are compared with one another in Ivantsov et al., 2018. Within this paper, Atakia is described as having “disc-shaped casts with an adjoining worm-like body,” while Fustiglyphus has “horizontal cylindrical traces of a different length have more or less regular bead-like expansions.” In short, both of these genera are similar in the association with bead-like and rounded morphology with “tadpole-like prints”. The worm has a ratio of approximately 1:3 of head to tail where the tail part has a segmented structure. There have also been no traces of movement from around the structures of Atakia, so it is assumed that the prints are planktonic.

Muscente et al., 2019 used COPRA (community overlap propagation algorithm) to describe the Atakia genus and found they have a morphogroup most like porifera (putative).

With poor preservation, it's difficult to say which end of Atakia specimen is its head and which is its tail.

== Fossilization ==
The mode of preservation found for Atakia and related species according to COPRA (community overlap propagation algorithm) is secondary mineralization of fossils and carbonaceous compressions. Atakia has very poor preservation that also hinders any identifying information about the biogenic nature of the specimen.

== Distribution and paleoenvironment ==
The specimens of Atakia were found in the Vendian sediments in the formations of the Eastern European Platform, specifically the Urals and Podolia. From matching facies, a paleoenvironment where specimens were found was determined to be a shallow sea in a clastic lower shoreface. This specific genera are categorized as Ediacara-type fossils from 571 to 551 Ma. Based on stratigraphic index fossils, Atakia thrived in the Ediacara biota biozone, but within less than five stratigraphic formations. In specific, some specimens were found in a clay siltstone substrate.

The paper by Muscente et al., 2019 applied COPRA (community overlap propagation algorithm) to the Ediacaran genera to detect four overlapping modules. The largest cluster, called the White Sea cluster, consists of bilateralomorph, dickinsoniomorph, and kimberellomorph genera. The Avalon module primarily consists of rangeomorphs. The Nama cluster includes Ediacaran-type fossils and carbonate compressions. The last module is the Miaohe module, which primarily have filament, strap, and ribbon shaped characteristics. All of these module can overlap with each other to include more groups of taxa. Specifically, the Atakia taxon lies in between the Nama and White Sea cluster. Within this group, only fourteen genera are found, which shows the sheer scarcity of Atakia and any related genera (Horodyskia, Helanoichnus, Fusosquamula, Saarina, Ausia, etc.).

The paper by Yevheniia (2018) describes the geology of the sequences Atakia and other genera were found in. These genera were found in the Yarishev Formation, which consists of three sedimentary sequences, named Bernashevsky, Bronnitsky, and Zinkovsky. The Bernashevsky sequence is 15–17 meters thick primarily consisting of sandstones 10–12 meters thick. The base of the sequence includes layers of tuffaceous argillites and bentonite. Some major mineral constituents include mica and kaolinite in the bentonite layers.

== Other notable characteristics ==
The identification of the Atakia genus is debatable as it closely matches and suspected to be the same as the genus Fustiglyphus Vialov, which are found in the same regions as Atakia, but are scattered throughout different stratigraphic formations.
