= Zolotitsa =

- Native name: Золотица (Russian)

Location
- Country: Russia

Physical characteristics
- Mouth
  - location: White Sea
  - coordinates: 65°42′02″N 40°11′27″E
- Length: 177 km (110 mi)
- Basin size: 1,950 km^{2} (750 sq mi)
- Discharge
  - average: 22.7 m^{3}/s (800 cu ft/s)

The Zolotitsa (Russian: Золотица, Зимняя Золотица) is a river in Primorsky District of Arkhangelsk Oblast in Russia. It flows into the White Sea at the Winter Coast. The length of the river is 177 kilometres (110 mi), and the area of its drainage basin is 1,950 square kilometres (750 sq mi).
