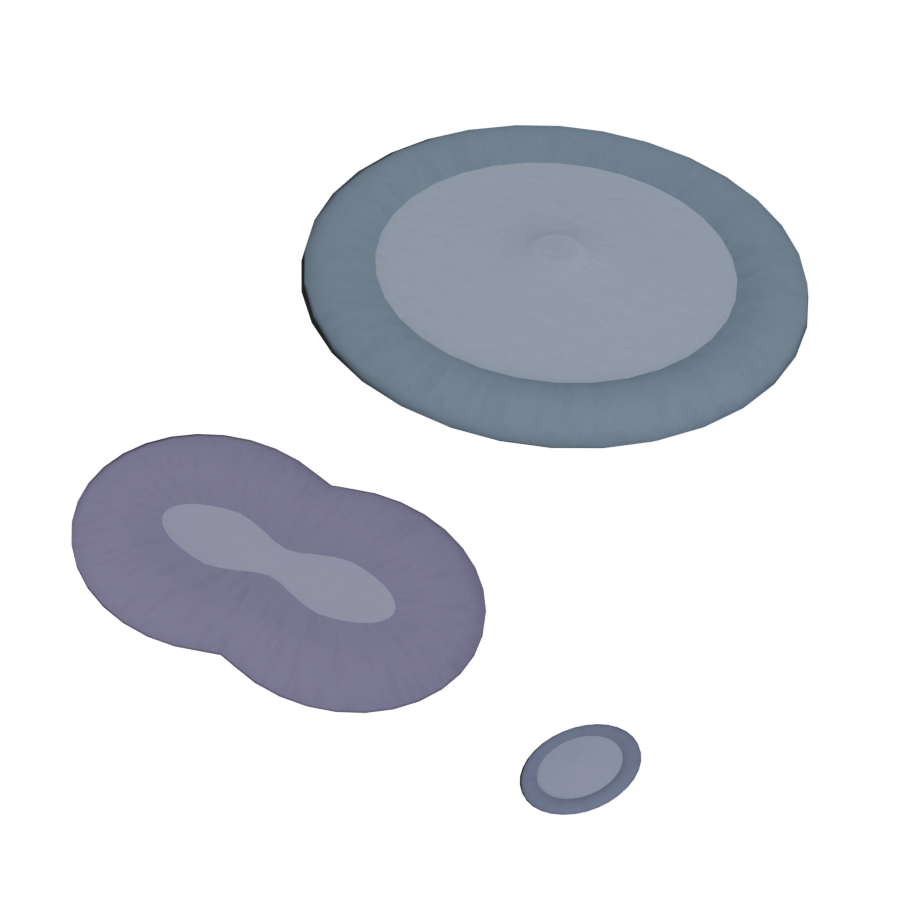
- 3D reconstructions of all Nimbia species as simple discs/rings. Top to bottom : N. occlusa, N. dniesteri, and N. paula

Scientific classification
- Domain: incertae sedis
- Genus: †Nimbia; Fedonkin, 1980

Type species
- †Nimbia occlusa Fedonkin, 1980

Species
- N. occlusa Fedonkin, 1980; N. dniesteri Fedonkin, 1983; N. paula (?) Gureev, 1985

= Nimbia (genus) =

Nimbia Temporal range: Tonian – Cambrian 766–537 Ma

Enigmatic discoidal organism from the Neoproterozoic

Nimbia is a common enigmatic discoidal form from Neoproterozoic, possibly into the Cambrian, and can be found from across the globe. Most researchers consider them to either be simple microbial colonies, equally simple cnidarians, or the holdfasts of a larger organism, such as those seen in the Petalonamae phylum.

== Discovery ==
The first fossils of Nimbia were found from the Ediacaran aged Ustʹ Pinega Formation, on the Winter Coast (Zimnii Bereg) of the White Sea, Northwestern Russia, and described in 1980.

== Etymology ==
The generic name Nimbia derives from the Latin word "Nimbus", to mean "halo", in reference to the rim seen in the original fossils.

The specific name for N. occlusa derives from the Latin word "occlusal", to mean "closed", in reference to the smooth appearance of the species. The specific name for N. dniesteri is derived from the Dniester River, which flows past the formation were the fossils specimens for this species were found.

== Description ==
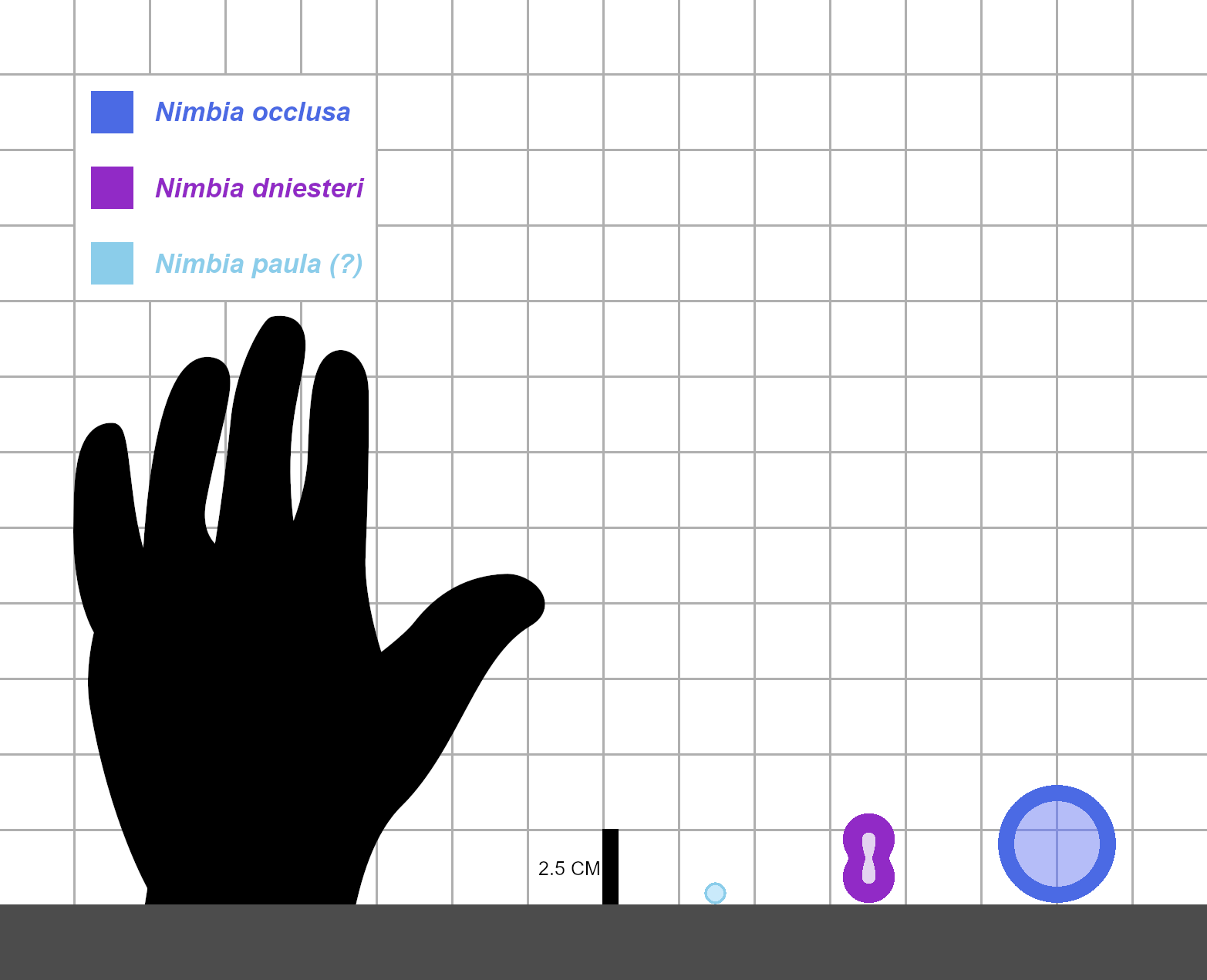
Size chart of all Nimbia species.

Nimbia occlusa is discoidal in overall shape, ranging from 15–40 mm (0.6–1.6 in) in diameter. It is usually flat, although some fossils may bear a central raised tubercle or a dimple, and the margin of the organism is also notably thick. There are also faint concentric annuli in some specimens, which can get up to 3–5 mm (0.1–0.2 in) wide, and are spaced from each other by 1.5–4 mm (0.1–0.2 in). For a long time, these fossils were considered to be the oldest know probable animals, although many studies done since have recovered older probable remains. They are also preserved as positive hypo-relief and low-relief, meaning that the fossils protrude from the rock surface.

A second species, named some three years after N. occlusa in 1983, was found near the Dniester River in Ukraine, and named N. dniesteri. This species bears the same thick marginal rim and smoother centre, although they notably differ from the type species in that they have a trapezoid morphology, similar to a figure of 8, which is known to reach up to 30–45 mm (1.2–1.8 in) on the longest axis, whilst the rims get up to 5 mm (0.2 in) in width. There is also a notable oral aperture, although it is small and shallow, and is positioned in the centre of the organism.

The third tentative species, named five years after N. occlusa in 1985, was found in the Nagoriany Formation in Ukraine, and named N. paula. This species bears many similarities to N. occlusa with a smooth circular ridge and smooth central region, only differing from N. occlusa in its smaller sizes, measuring up to 5.2 mm (0.2 in) in diameter.

Overall, they have been compared to other medusoid organisms, such as the extant Solmissus, having a similar smooth appearance in the bell, although unlike Solmissus, Nimbia does not have any tentacles.

== Affinities ==
When first described in 1980, Nimbia was originally considered to be a Coelenterata, a now rejected phylum that contains cnidarians. Although, since this interpretation, other researchers have in recent years been slowly putting forward the reinterpretation of Nimbia as a microbial colony instead, alongside a number of other discoidal forms such as Ediacaria. Other studies have noted that Nimbia, alongside many other discoidal fossils from the Neoproterozoic, may possibly be synonymous with Aspidella and also interpreted as the holdfasts of petalonamid organisms.

== Taxonomy ==
Since its description, Nimbia has seen four species assigned to it, although only two remain fully valid, whilst one is tentative and another no longer valid. They are as follows:

Species	Authority	Type locality	Status	Notes	Refs
Nimbia occlusa	Fedonkin (1980)	Ustʹ Pinega Formation, Russia	valid	Type species	
Nimbia dniesteri	Fedonkin (1983)	Mogilev Formation, Ukraine	valid		
Nimbia gaojiashanensis	Zhang (1986)	Dengying Formation, China	invalid	Junior synonym of tubular fossil Gaojiashania cyclus.	
Nimbia paula	Gureev (1985)	Nagoriany Formation, Ukraine		The species was described from a single specimen.	

== Distribution ==
Nimbia occurs in a number of locations across a large range of time. The oldest known fossils have been recorded from the Kurgan Formation in Kazakhstan, which has been dated to roughly 766 Ma, placing them firmly within the Tonian. (Note: The paper was written before the Tonian period was extended from 1000 – 850 to 1000 – 720 Ma.) Alongside this, they have also been recorded in a number of Ediacaran formations, from the Ustʹ Pinega Formation in Russia, the Mogilev Formation, Dniester River in Ukraine, the Lakheri Limestone, Sirbu and Sonia Formation in India, the Itajaí Basin in Brazil, the Adoudou Formation in Morocco, the Dengying Formation in South China, to the Estenilla Formation in Spain.

There are also tentative records from the Ediacaran Indreelva Member of the Stáhpogieddi Formation in Norway, the Ediacaran Mahi Formation in India, the Ediacaran aged "Lower Member" of the Wood Canyon Formation and the Ediacaran Stirling Quartzite in the United States, the Ediacaran aged Sukhoy Pit Group in Siberia, and the lower Cambrian aged Breidvika Formation in Norway.

They had also been recorded from the upper Cambrian Booley Bay Formation in Ireland, although these were later discounted as simple swing marks. They were also reported from the Twitya Formation of Canada, which has been dated to 662±3 Ma near the end of the Sturtian glaciation in the Cryogenian. Although, a study undertaking in 2007 discounted these as being Nimbia, and instead they are mostly likely microbial colonies, with the complex morphologies noted to be the result various different taphonomic artefacts.

== See also ==
- List of Ediacaran genera
