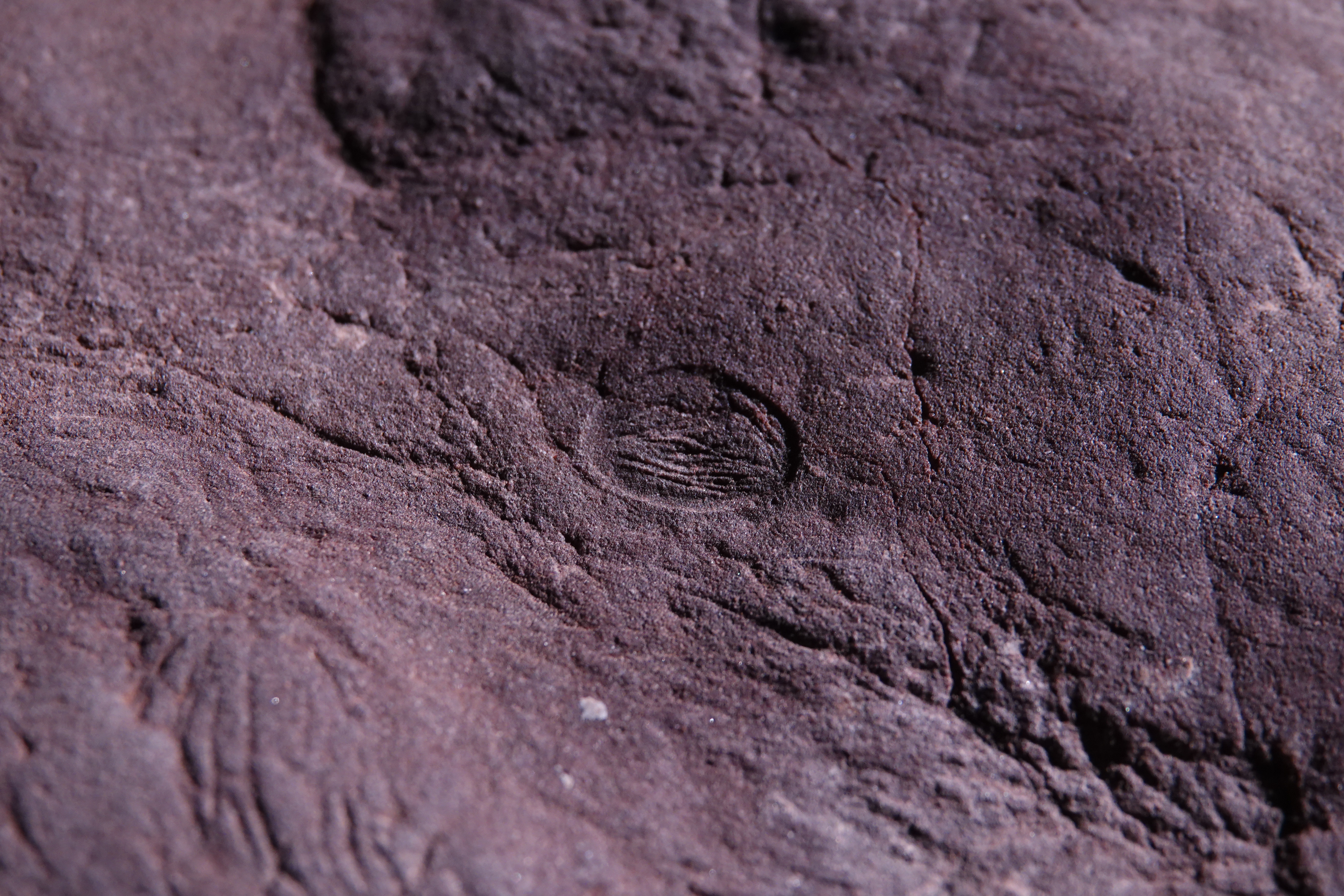
- A fossil specimen of Attenborites janeae

Scientific classification
- Domain: incertae sedis
- Genus: †Attenborites; Droser et al., 2020
- Species: †A. janeae

Binomial name
- †Attenborites janeae Droser et al., 2020

= Attenborites =

Attenborites Temporal range: late Ediacaran ~555–551 Ma

Oval-shaped organism of unknown affinities

Attenborites is an extinct genus of unknown affinities from the late Ediacaran of Australia and Moldova. It is an irregularly oval-shaped fossil, and is inferred to have lived a pelagic lifestyle. It is also a monotypic genus, only containing Attenborites janeae.

== Discovery and naming ==
The fossils of Attenborites were found on the TR-ARB bed in the Ediacara Member of the Rawnsley Quartzite, in the Flinders Ranges of South Australia in 2017, and were formally described and named in 2020.

The generic name Attenborites is in honour of Sir David Attenborough, due to his contributions in communicating the importance of the Ediacaran biota, and paleontology overall. The specific name janeae is in honour of Jane Fargher, due to her commitment in bringing the fossils of the Ediacara Member into the public.

== Description ==
Attenborites janeae is an irregularly shaped oval organism, ranging between 4.5–24 mm (0.2–0.9 in) in length. The body itself contains a varying number of internal grooves, ranging from 2 to 15 in number and 0.5–1 mm (0.0–0.0 in) in width, and which run parallel to the long axis of the body, all converging at either end, though notably to not make contact with the outer margin of the body. The grooves are suggested to be some form of internal structure, although the irregular number of them across all known specimens prevents any proper reconstruction of said structures.

Attenborites was most likely spheroid in life, with the ridges and grooves potentially being a part of the organism before deformation, or are the result of the membrane folding over itself during deformation and burial. The latter was further supported, suggesting that Attenborites was likely smooth in life as well.

== Taphonomy ==
The fossils of Attenborites are notably preserved in negative hypo-relief, meaning the fossils are impressions on the rocks surface, and have a well-defined and sharp outer margin, suggesting it was most likely separate from the mat-ground that covers surfaces throughout the Rawnsley Quartzite. The defined out margin is noted to infer that the organism was most likely composed of a thick but flexible material. The irregular shape, presence of the grooves and lack of a proper internal morphology suggests that Attenborites most likely underwent significant deflation and deformation prior to or during burial. Unlike fossils of other Ediacaran genera, which are casts of a partially compacted organisms, fossils of Attenborites are inferred to be casts of a fully compacted and deflated organism.

== Palaeoecology ==
Attenborites is noted to be rare in terms of its distribution across the Rawnsley Quartzite, although in the beds it is found in, it is incredibly common, numbering up to 16 specimens per square metre on the TR-ARB surface in which they were found on. As stated previously, the margins of all Attenborites specimens are notably sharp, with one specimen being found on top of a Yorgia trace. With this, alongside the deformed and irregular appearance of the fossils, and the lack of any proper holdfast structure or the growth of the mat-ground around the fossils margins, it has been suggested that it is most likely a pelagic organism, drifting through the water, similar to some cnidarians like jellyfish. Although it was noted still that a benthic lifestyle could not be ruled out at the time of its description in 2020.

The pelagic interpretation was further supported in 2023 whilst researchers were restudying the varying morphologies of Eoandromeda, noting that said organism was most likely benthic to its blurred margins from the mat-ground growing up onto the organisms, but also due to the wide distribution of Eoandromeda, which is also notably common throughout the formations it is found from. Meanwhile, Attenborites again was noted to have much sharper margins than Eoandromeda, and is also much rarer, only being found en masse on a single bed in the Rawnsley Quartzite.

This interpretation of a pelagic lifestyle was again given further support just a year later in 2024, with a comprehensive study performed on over 100 specimens. Once again, the sharp margins of the fossils were noted, as well as their irregular and asymmetrical outlines. It was also noted that only 75 specimens were preserved with internal grooves, with the specimens being notably larger than those without the internal grooves preserved, suggesting that these structures are indeed the result of the membrane wrinkling and deforming during burial, with this becoming more likely the larger the organism was. With all this, alongside the previously noted specimen on a Yorgia feeding trace and other specimens being found on felled algae, the researchers concluded that Attenborites was most likely a pelagic organism, due to the amount of evidence for such an interpretation, which was also noted to be evidence against the benthic interpretation.

== Distribution ==
Whilst fossils of Attenborites are predominately known from the Rawnsley Quartzite in Southern Australia, some examples have also been found from the Dzhurzhivka Beds of the Nagoriany Formation in Moldova.

== See also ==
- List of Ediacaran genera
