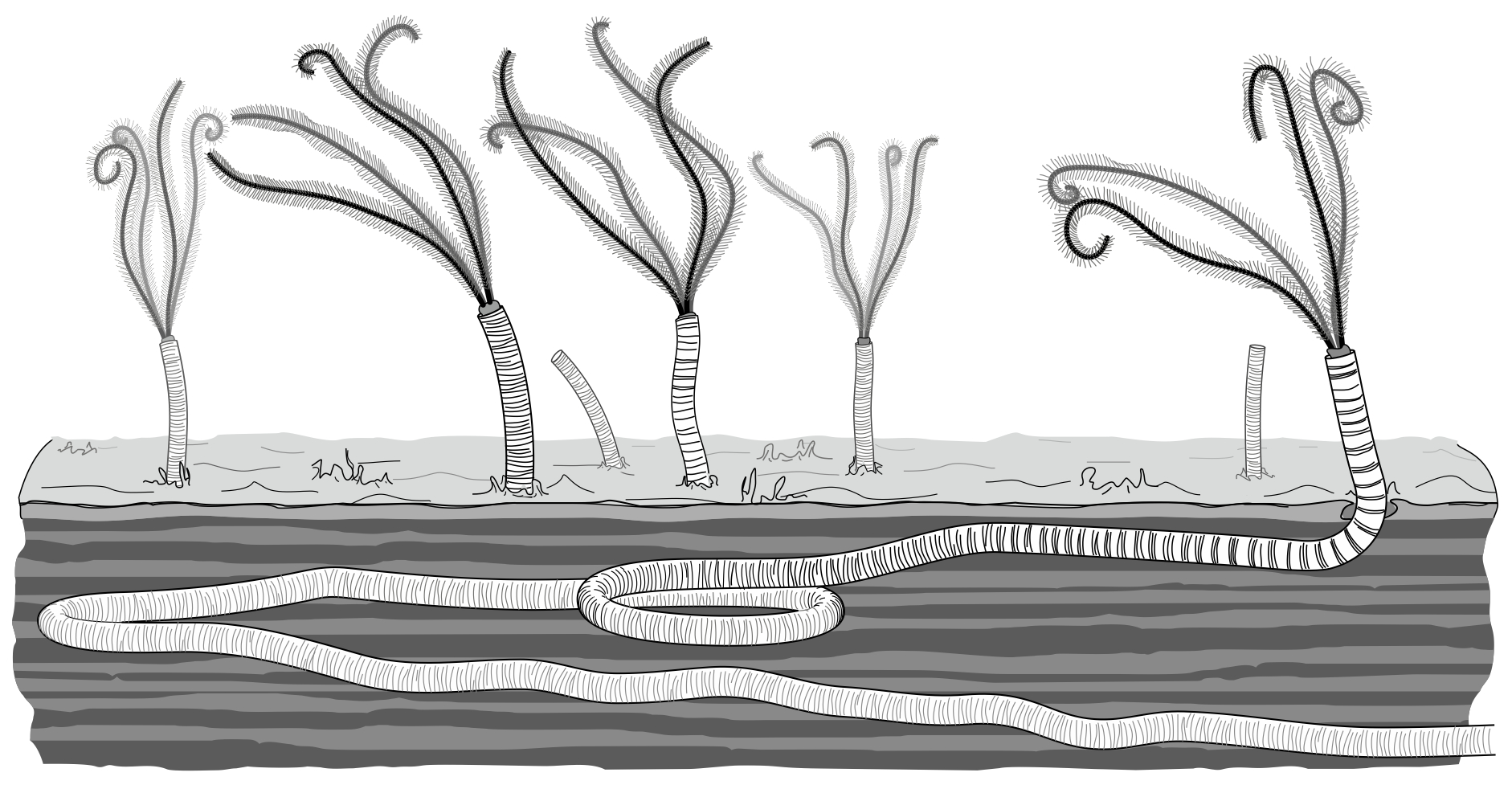
- Reconstruction of C. striata

Scientific classification
- Domain: Eukaryota
- Kingdom: Animalia
- Phylum: Annelida
- Family: †Sabelliditida
- Genus: †Calyptrina; Sokolov, 1967
- Species: †C. striata

Binomial name
- †Calyptrina striata Sokolov, 1967

= Calyptrina striata =

Calyptrina striata Temporal range: Ediacaran, about 567–550 Ma

Ediacaran organism

Calyptrina striata is an Ediacaran tubular fossil, probably belonging to some kind of tube-dwelling annelid worm. The tubes is preserved as a flat carbonaceous organic or pyrite shadows left behind in shales, and as a relief imprints and casts in sandstones. Specimens have been found and documented in numerous Ediacaran localities of the White Sea area of Russia and possibly in Southeast China.

== Morphology and behavior ==
It was a very long unbranched cylindrical organic-walled tube, probably of a protein-chitinous composition. The surface of the tube is decorated with transverse wrinkles and rings, as well as thin longitudinal ribs. Most of the Calyptrina tube was located in the sediment under the microbial mats, in a toxic anoxic environment rich in hydrogen sulfide. The short front end of the tube rose vertically above the sea bottom surface. The morphology and habitat of Calyptrina are similar to the tubes and habitat of siboglinids. At the same time, the biomarker analysis of the organic fossil of Calyptrina indicates that the animal had an intestine and fed on green algae and bacteria, probably filtering them out of the water.
