= White Sea Throat =

Strait of the White Sea, Russia

Coordinates: 66°13′N 40°35′E

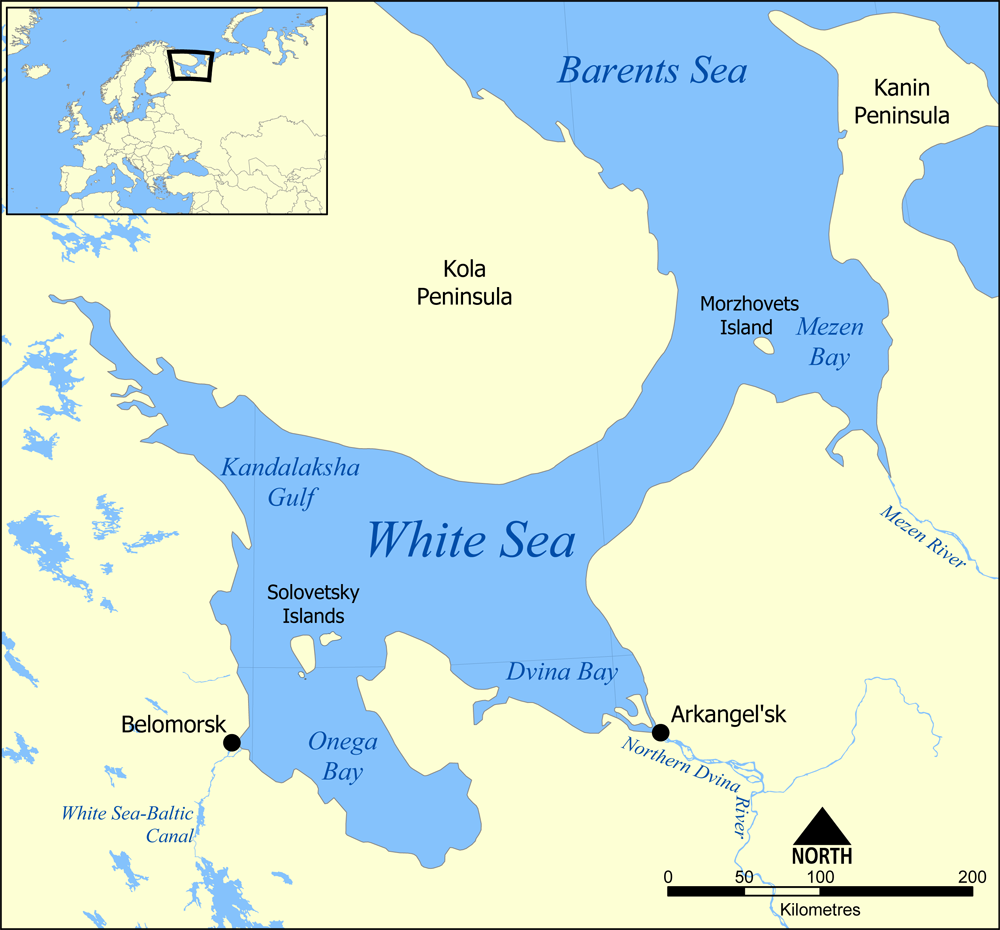
White Sea Throat

White Sea Throat (Russian: Горло Белого моря) is a strait in northwestern Russia. It separates the Kola Peninsula from the Winter Coast, and connects the White Sea in the south-west with the Barents Sea in the north-east. It is 160 km long and 46–93 km wide.
