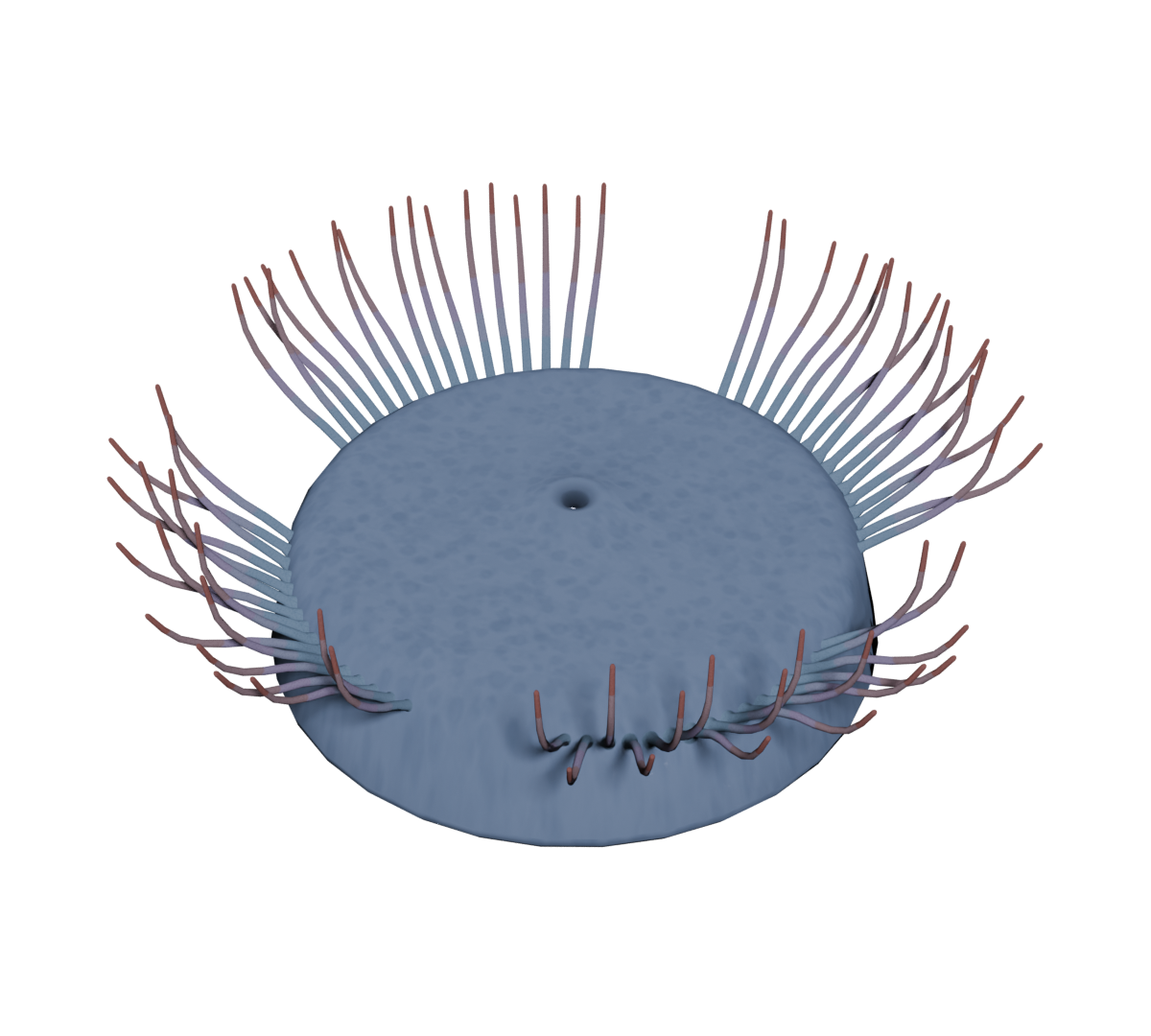
- 3D Reconstruction of Staurinidia crucicula

Scientific classification
- Kingdom: Animalia
- Phylum: Cnidaria
- Class: Scyphozoa
- Order: incertae sedis
- Genus: †Staurinidia; Fedonkin, 1985
- Species: †S. crucicula

Binomial name
- †Staurinidia crucicula Fedonkin, 1985

= Staurinidia =

Staurinidia Temporal range: late Ediacaran ~557–552 Ma

Possible Scyphozoan-grade enigma

Staurinidia is a genus of Ediacaran soft-bodied organism from the deposits of the Ust' Pinega Formation. It is a monotypic genus, containing only the single species Staurinidia crucicula. The genus was first described in 1985 by Russian palaeontologist Mikhail A. Fedonkin. S. crucicula's four-fold symmetry is present as a result of four canals radiating from the middle of a small cavity in the middle of the body. Other forms with four way symmetry, mainly medusoid forms, from the Ediacaran (Conomedusites, Persimedusites) comprise an essential chunk of the Ediacaran diversity of symmetry; their organisations are similar to, though smaller than, those of a modern-day scyphozoan cnidarian.

== Description ==
Staurinidia crucicula fossils are commonly preserved as a small discoidal form baring four radial canals emitting from the centre, in which a small cavity is present. The ends of the canals are often swollen when pointing towards the organisms periphery. In larger fossils, tentacles have been found present and preserved around the outside of the disc's margin, which itself is very thin and having no indication of an encircling ridge or canal. A recent study also found a much larger specimen, most likely an adult, with fully complete canals and tentacles, which showed that the canals bifurcate several times before reaching the outer margin of the body.

The diameter of the body of Staurinidia ranges from 6–7 mm (0.2–0.3 in) in young specimens to 50 mm (2.0 in) in adult specimens, with the width of the canal being 1 mm (0.0 in) and the length of the marginal tentacles being 4–5 mm (0.2–0.2 in) in length. The canals give the animal a four-fold symmetry typical to that of other Ediacaran cnidarians. As such, Staurinidia is regarded as one of the simplest of all Ediacaran cnidarians that show four-way rotational axis.

== See also ==
- List of Ediacaran genera
