= Leiosphaerid =

Leiosphaeridia is a form-genus of acritarchs proposed by Eisenack in 1958. The grouping was refined to represent a more natural group by Jankauskas.

Some leiosphaerid acritarchs have been recognised as vaucheriacean algæ.

The class represents shallow-water environments.

== See also ==
- Leiosphaeridia
