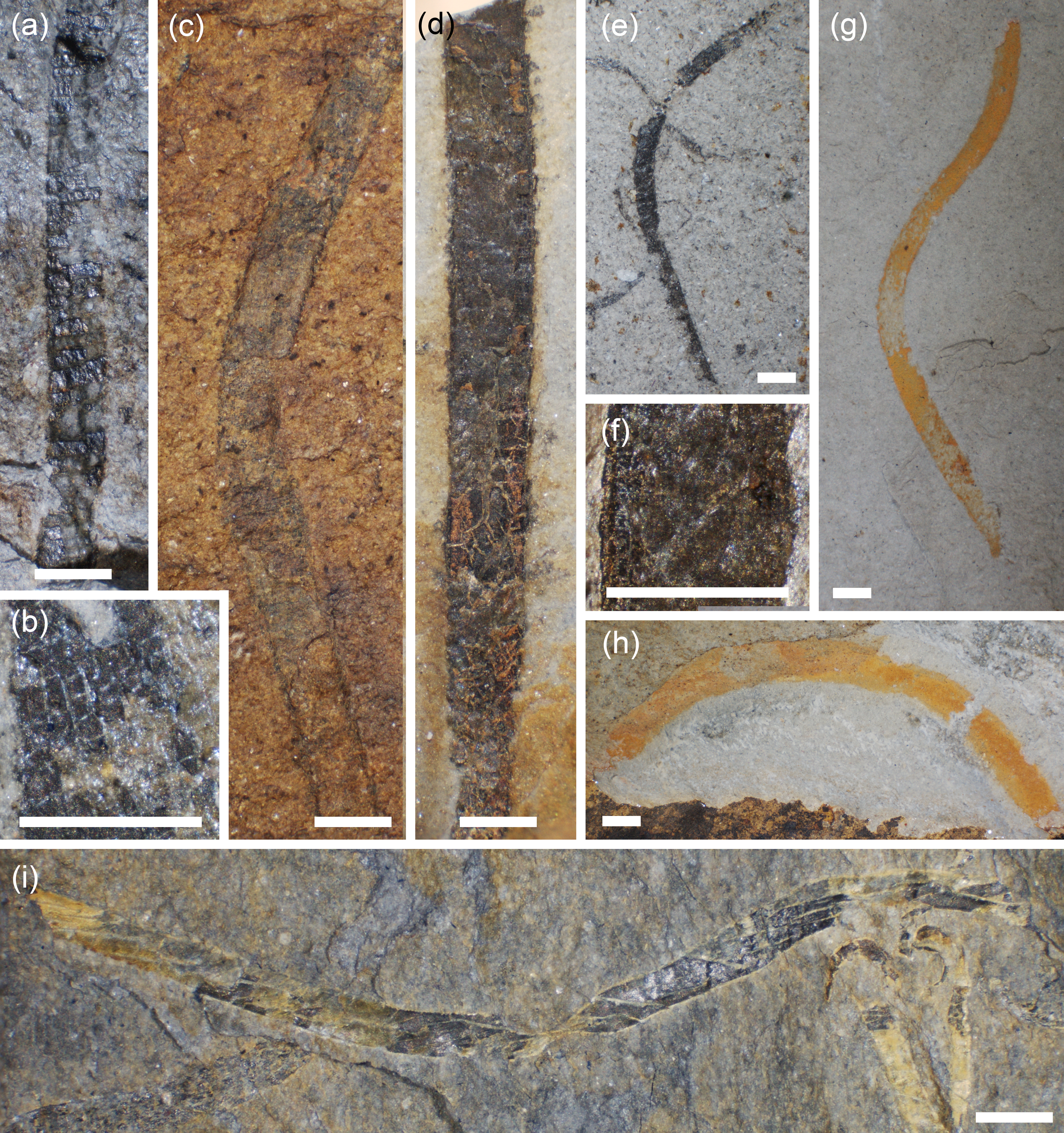
- Sabellidites (Sabelliditidae)

Scientific classification
- Kingdom: Animalia
- Phylum: Annelida
- Order: †Sabelliditida; Sokolov, 1965

Families
- †Saarinidae Sokolov, 1965; †Sabelliditidae Sokolov, 1965

= Sabelliditida =

Sabelliditida Temporal range: Ediacaran–Cambrian Stage 3

Extinct order of annelid worms

Sabelliditida is an extinct order of annelids that lived from the Ediacaran to the Atdabanian stage of the Cambrian. It contains two families, Saarinidae and Sabelliditidae.
