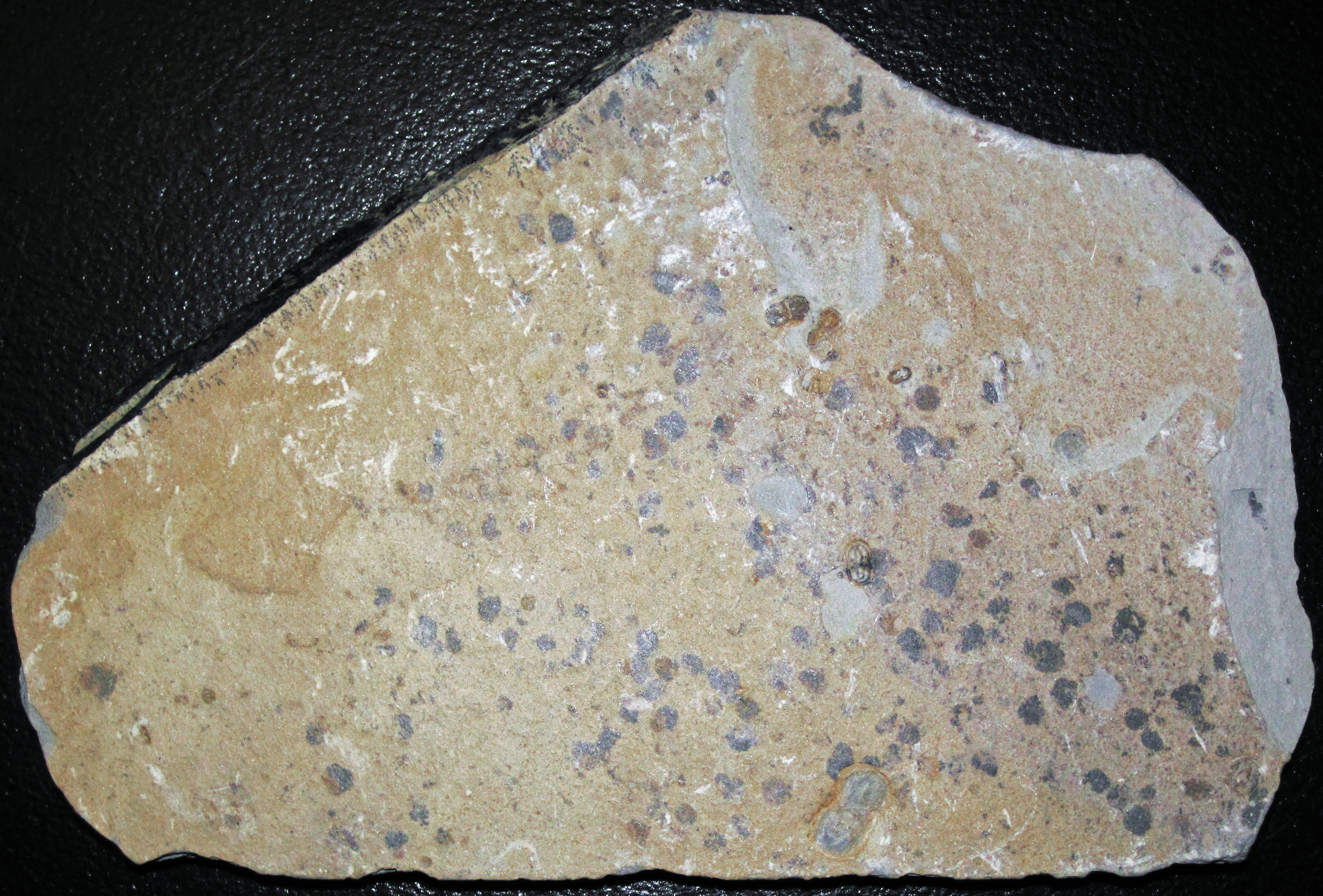
- Morania fragmenta fossil from Millard County, Utah

Scientific classification
- Domain: Bacteria
- Kingdom: Bacillati
- Phylum: Cyanobacteriota
- Genus: †Morania

= Morania =

Morania Temporal range: Late early Cambrian - Middle Cambrian

Extinct genus of bacteria

Morania is a genus of cyanobacterium preserved as carbonaceous films in the Middle Cambrian Burgess Shale. it is present throughout the shale; 2580 specimens of Morania are known from the Greater Phyllopod bed, where they comprise 4.90% of the community. It is filamentous, forms sheets, and resembles the modern cyanobacterium Nostoc. It would have had a role in binding the sediment, and would have been a food source for such organisms as Odontogriphus and Wiwaxia.
