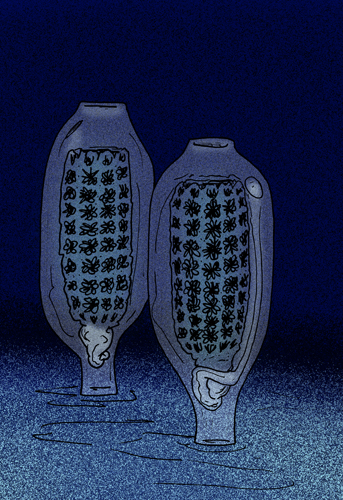
- Artists reconstruction of G. kushkii as an organism similar to Ausia's interpretation as a Tunicate.

Scientific classification
- Kingdom: Animalia
- Phylum: incertae sedis
- Genus: †Gibbavasis; Vaziri, Majidifard & Laflamme, 2018
- Species: †G. kushkii

Binomial name
- †Gibbavasis kushkii Vaziri, Majidifard & Laflamme, 2018

= Gibbavasis =

Gibbavasis Temporal range: Ediacaran

Genus of Ediacaran organisms

Gibbavasis kushkii is a species of an enigmatic member of the Ediacaran biota from central Iran. G. kushkii has been compared to the Namibian Ausia. The genus name "Gibbavasis" is a combination of the two Latin words gibba (meaning 'bumpy') and vasis (meaning 'vase').

== Etymology ==
The name of the genus "Gibbavasis" is a combination of the two Latin words gibba (meaning 'bumpy') and vasis (meaning 'vase'), these two words coincide with one another because specimens of G. kushkii often resemble bumpy vases fossilised into the ground. Meanwhile, the name "kushkii" is a reference to where the holotypes were found, the Kushk Series along with the Kushk Area.

== Discovery ==
In 2018, Vaziri, Majidifard and Laflamme discovered Gibbavasis in Central Iran with their findings resulting Nine specimens preserved in negative epirelief. These nine specimens were found in the grey argillaceous shales -sub-unit 6- of the Kushk Series from the Kushk Area (Chahgaz (Dargazin) locale, all of them being located in the Bafq region inside the Chahmir area in the Behabad region, located in Central Iran.

The discovery of Gibbavasis (alongside other Ediacarans from Iran) are a key highlight of a diverse, globally-distributed community of the soft-bodied ediacarans and the skeletionized tubular forms (such as Cloudina) seen in Namibia that are likely of metazoan descent. These forms from Iran are examples of a biosphere going through a transitional phase with evidence for this claim being the abundance and diversity of organisms from the large and mostly soft-bodied organisms (Ediacaran biota) to much more complex, mineralized and skeletonized tubular forms from the dawn of the early Cambrian.

== Description ==
Gibbavasis kushkii represents a form that is (morphologically) similar in anatomy to the Namibian Ausia, because A. fenestrata also possess the same external openings (or pores, since both have been interpreted as poriferans). On the other hand, G. kushkii has a more goblet- to oval-shaped body with various external openings, that originally might have been similar to sponges, visible on the entirety of its body preserved in negative epirelief. The physique of this form is similar overall to a collumner in shape, with all of the openings suggesting a possible poriferan-affinity and possibly being capable of effective filter feeding. Although that is counteracted with the fact that there is an apparent absence of siliceous or carbonaceous spicules present. All of this evidence shows that incertae sedis is the best class to put this animal into.

== See also ==
- List of Ediacaran genera
- Ausia
