= Pomoria rhomboidalis =

Scientific classification
- Domain: Bacteria
- Phylum: Cyanobacteria
- Genus: Pomoria Sivertzeva et Jankauskas
- Species: P. rhomboidalis

Binomial name
- Pomoria rhomboidalis (Siverzeva) Siverzeva

Synonyms
- Oscillatoriopsis rhomboidalis Sivertzeva

Pomoria rhomboidalis are Late Ediacaran microfossils of cyanobacterial trichome which is a characteristic taxon of the fossil microbiota in the East European Platform, it is also found in the Siberia and China. It is the only species in the genus Pomoria.

Originally, this fossil was described as Oscillatoriopsis rhomboidalis Sivertzeva, 1985 on the basis of a specimen from Torozhma borehole, Arkhangelsk Region, Russia. Later, the species O. rhomboidalis was reassigned to the separate genus Pomoria Sivertzeva et Jankauskas, 1989.

Pomoria is distinguished from other fossil trichomes by a thin longitudinal or diagonal striate sculpture.
