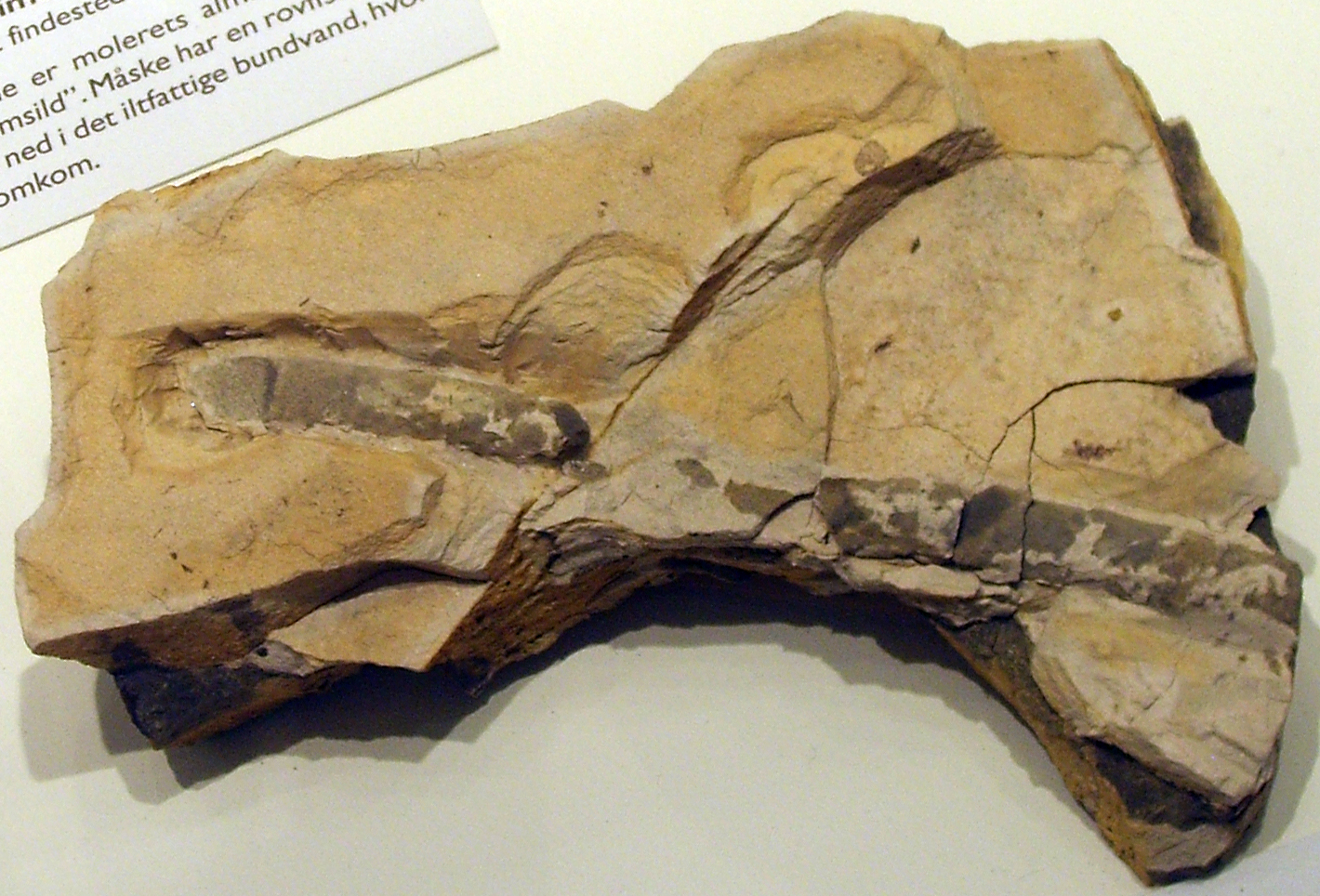
- Planolites sp. fossil at the Geological Museum in Copenhagen

Trace fossil classification
- Ichnogenus: †Planolites; Nicholson, 1873

Ichnospecies
- See text.

= Planolites =

Planolites Temporal range: Ediacaran–Bartonian

Trace fossil of the Phanerozoic

Planolites is an ichnogenus found throughout the Ediacaran and the Phanerozoic that is made during the feeding process of worm-like animals. The traces are generally small, 1–5 mm (0.039–0.197 in), unlined, and rarely branched, with fill that differs from the host rock.

== Distribution ==
Planolites fossils have been found in Africa, Asia, Europe, Antarctica, and the Americas (with most specimens found in North America).

== Ichnospecies ==
Ichnospecies in Planolites include:

- P. annularis Walcott, 1890
- P. annularius Walcott, 1890
- P. ballandus Webby, 1970
- P. beverleyensis Billings, 1862
- P. incipiens (Billings, 1861)
- P. montanus Richter, 1937
- P. reticulatus Alpert, 1975
- P. serpens Webby, 1970
- P. striatus (Hall, 1852)
- P. terraenovae Fillion and Pickerill, 1990
- P. virgatus (Hall, 1847)

== See also ==
- List of Ediacaran genera
