= Breidvika Formation =

Geologic formation in Norway

Breivik Formation
- Stratigraphic range: Cambrian
- Type: Formation

Location
- Country: Norway

The Breivik Formation is a geologic formation in Norway. It preserves fossils dating back to the Cambrian period.

== See also ==
- List of fossiliferous stratigraphic units in Norway
