= Tirasiana =

Tirasiana Temporal range: Ediacaran

Scientific classification
- Kingdom: Animalia
- Phylum: Cnidaria
- Class: Scyphozoa
- Order: incertae sedis
- Genus: †Tirasiana; Palij, 1976

Species
- ✝Tirasiana disciformis Palij, 1976; ✝Tirasiana coniformis Palij, 1976; ✝Tirasiana concentralis Bekker, 1977

Discoidal organism with no clear diagnostics

Tirasiana is a genus of disc-shaped animals from the Ediacaran period that contains three species: T. concentralis, T. coniformis and T. disciformis, all which are distinguished by the complexity of their stepped structure.

== Affinity ==
Tirasiana moulds are thought to be discoidal body fossils of some kind, showing radial symmetry in them and with a round nodule in the middle.

== See also ==
- List of ediacaran genera
- Aspidella
