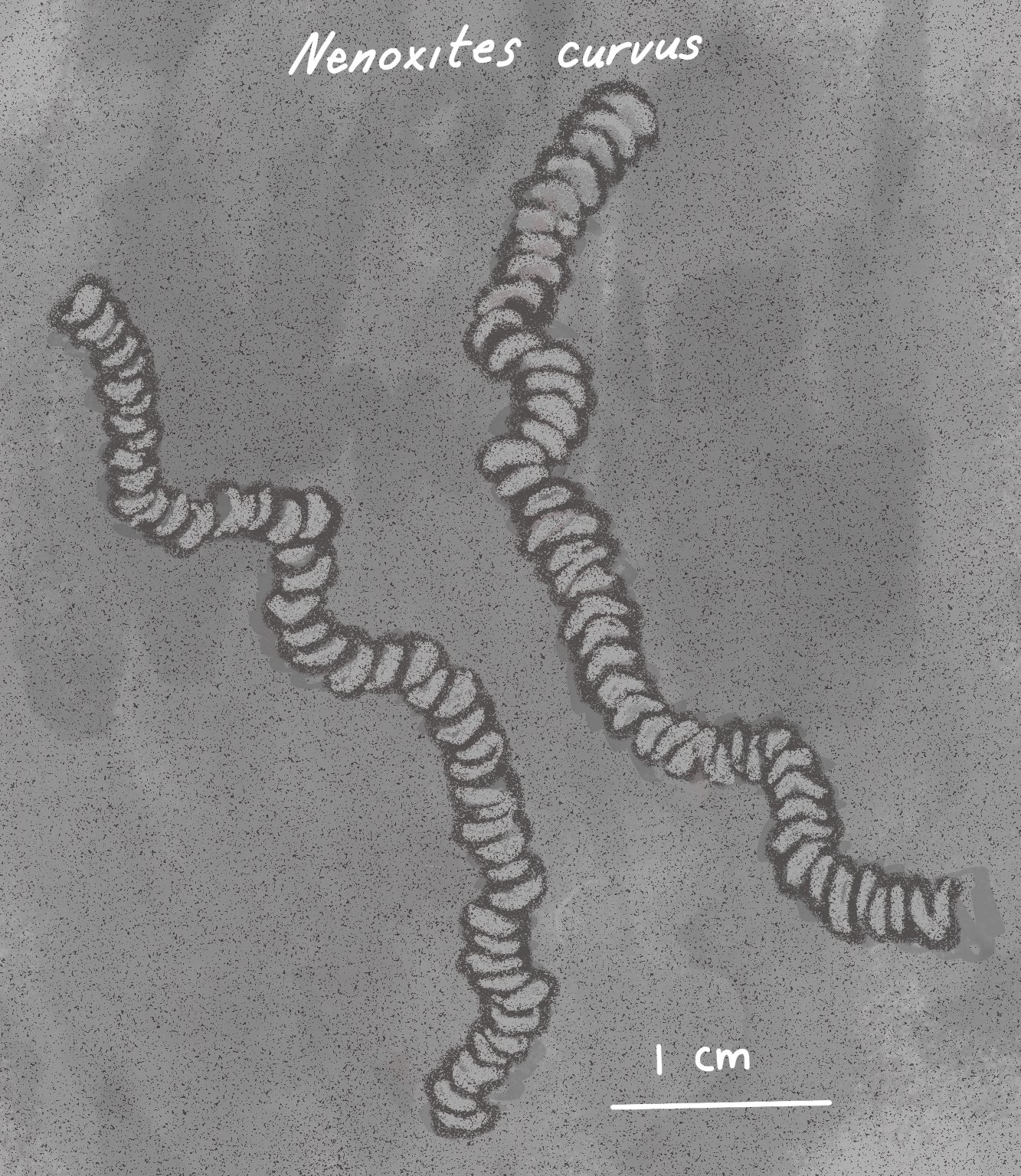
- Paleoart rendition of Nenoxites curvus fossils with 1 cm scale bar.

Trace fossil classification
- Ichnogenus: †Nenoxites; Fedonkin, 1973

Ichnospecies
- †Nenoxites curvus Fedonkin, 1973

= Nenoxites =

Extinct Ediacaran ichnogenus

Nenoxites is an extinct genus of Ediacaran ichnofossils described by Mikhail Fedonkin in 1973. The genus is monotypic; the only species to have been described is Nenoxites curvus.

== Description ==
Nenoxites is a repichnia trace of soft-bodied bilaterians, similar to a modern day shell-less gastropod. The traces are hypothesized to have been created via locomotive peristalsis, a wave-like constriction and relaxation of muscle resulting in the sinouous pattern and irregular depressions of the fossil. Nenoxites ichnofossils are thought to be the earliest instance of precambrian bioturbation, a behavior wherein an organism disturbs substrate to find food. The common interpretation of the morphology of Nenoxites is comparable to traces of contemporary gastropods, and is thought to have been made by the earliest tripoblastic eumetazoans, though there is no current agreed upon taxonomy or biology of Nenoxites.

Instances of Nenoxites have been recorded in the Khatyspyt Formation in arctic Siberia, as well as in Russia and China.

Some scientists disagree with the popular interpretation of Nenoxites as a trace fossil, and instead interpret it as a body fossil. Some interpret it as a mycetozoan, due to the irregularity in its size.
