= Mereșeuca =

Village in Ocnița District, Moldova

Mereușca
- Village
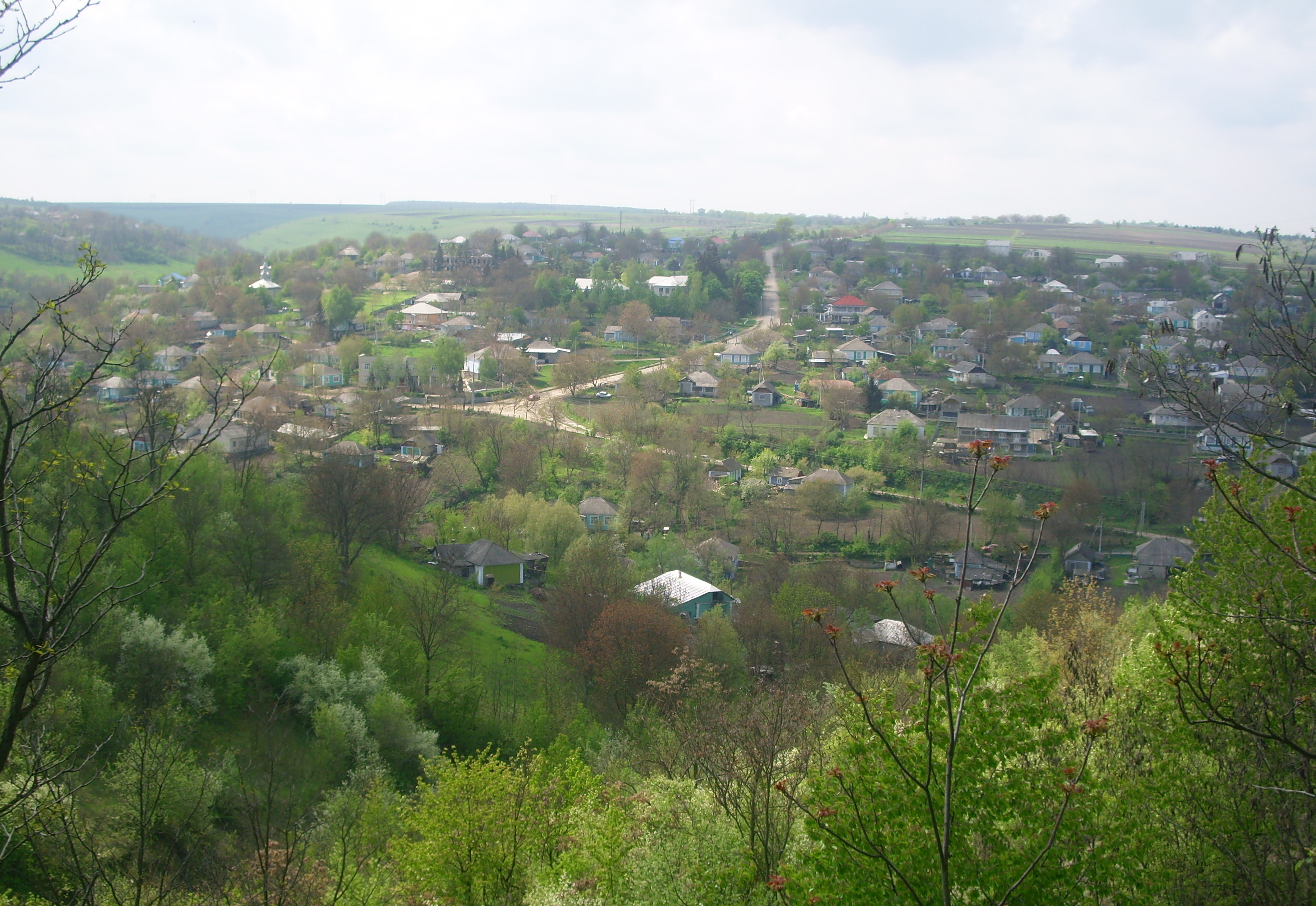

- Location within Moldova
- Coordinates: 48.4341666667°N 27.6841666667°E
- Country: Moldova
- District: Ocnița District

Government
  - Mayor: Emilia Albu (PDM)

Population (2014 census)
  - Total: 1,104
- Time zone: UTC+2 (EET)
  - Summer (DST): UTC+3 (EEST)

Mereșeuca is a village in Ocnița District, Moldova.

== Natives ==
- Vasile Bumacov (born 1957), diplomat and politician
