= Serebrina =

Serebrina Temporal range: Ediacaran

Scientific classification
- Kingdom: Incertae sedis
- Genus: †Serebrina; Ischenko, 1983
- Species: †S. crustacea

Binomial name
- †Serebrina crustacea Ischenko, 1988

Ediacaran encrusting macroscopic algae

Serebrina is an Ediacaran encrusting macroscopic algae first discovered by Ischenko in 1983. Very little is known of this genus. It has been found in several formations in Ukraine and Russia.

== Description ==
Serebrina exhibits an encrusting growth form and is interpreted as a thallus, a plant body lacking leaves and stems.

== Diversity ==
A single species, S. crustacea, is known. The species name presumably derives from the encrusting life habit.

== Discovery ==
First described by Ischenko in 1983, Serebrina has later been found by several other paleontologists in abundance in the Verkhovka Formation in Ukraine.

== Distribution ==
Macroscopic algae tend to be rarer in the Ediacaran fauna and are usually found in finer sediments. Serebrina has been found in several deposits, such as Mezen Syneclise and the Zimnegory Formation in Russia. The exact number of specimens found is not known for certain.

== Ecology ==
Based on the little information available, Serebrina appears to encrust on hard surfaces.

== See also ==
- List of Ediacaran genera
