= Winter Coast =

Coastal area in northwest Russia

Coordinates: 65.4939°N 39.8858°E

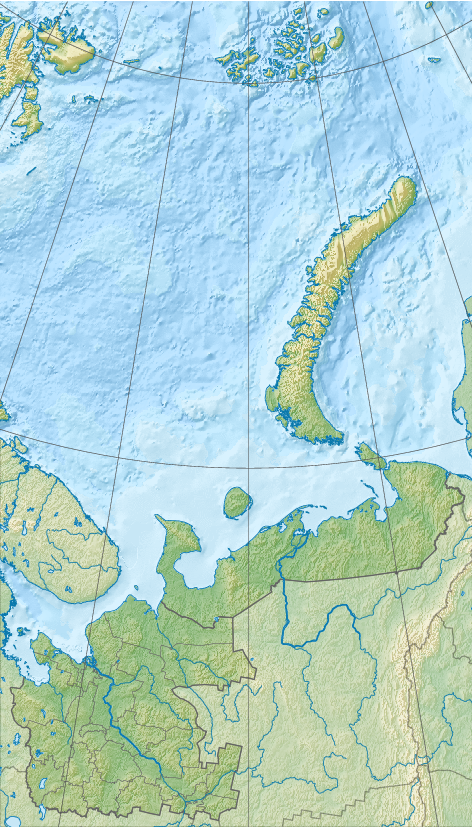

The Winter Coast (Zimniy Bereg, Russian: Зимний Берег) is a coastal area in Arkhangelsk Oblast in northwest Russia. It is located on the eastern side of the Dvina Bay in the White Sea, between the Northern Dvina delta and Cape Voronov, opposite to the Summer Coast. The names reflect the fact that the pomors of the Dvina Bay were fishing at Summer Coast and Winter Coast in the summer and in the winter, respectively. The major rivers flowing to the sea at the coast are the Lodma and the Zolotitsa.

Administratively, the Winter coast is shared between Primorsky and Mezensky Districts of Arkhangelsk Oblast.

The villages of Lapominka, Patrakeyevka, Kad, Kuya, Kozly, Veprevsky, Nizhnyaya Zolotitsa, Tova, Intsy, Ruchyi, Megra, Mayda, and Voronovsky are all located on the Winter Coast. The coast was populated not later than 13th century by the Pomors, and fishery was their traditional occupation until the 1990s, when it went into decline. There are no all-season land routes to most of the villages, and the connections are either by sea (irregular), or by air from Arkhangelsk.

The northern part of the district, with the villages of Ruchyi and Koyda, is included into border security zone, intended to protect the borders of Russian Federation from unwanted activity. In order to visit the zone, a permit issued by the local FSB department is required.
