= Leiosphaeridia =

Leiosphaeridia Temporal range: Statherian–Recent

Scientific classification
- Domain: Eukaryota
- (unranked): †Acritarcha
- Genus: †Leiosphaeridia; Eisenack, 1958

Extinct genus of protists

Leiosphaeridia is an extinct genus of acritarchs. Around 50 species are known, ranging from the Statherian of Australia seemingly to the present.

== See also ==
- Leiosphaerid
