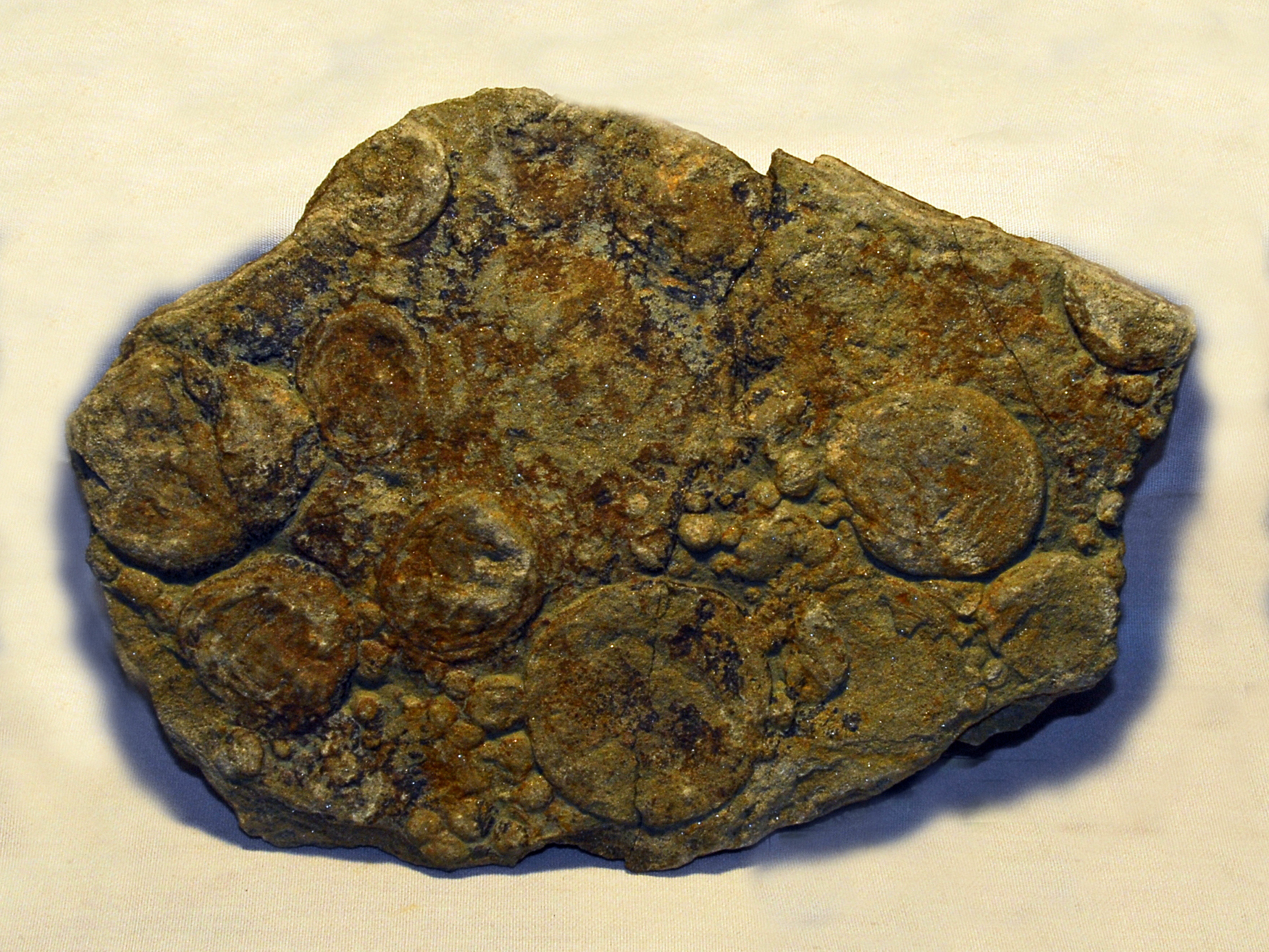

Scientific classification
- Domain: Bacteria
- Kingdom: Bacillati
- Phylum: Cyanobacteriota (?)
- Genus: †Beltanelliformis; Menner, 1974

Species
- B. brunsae Menner, 1974; B. minutae McIlroy et al., 2005

Synonyms
- Nemiana Palij, 1976; Beltanelloides Sokolov, 1965; Hagenetta Hahn et Pflug, 1988; Namamedusium Zessin, 2008

= Beltanelliformis =

Beltanelliformis Temporal range: Ediacaran 635–538.8 Ma

Ediacaran discoidal fossil

Beltanelliformis is a cyanobacterial/putative algae genus of discoid fossil that lived during the Ediacaran period around 635 to 538.8 million years ago. It contains two species, B. brunsae and B. minutae. It is sometimes ascribed to the Ediacaran Biota. Depending on its preservation, it is sometimes referred to as Nemiana or Beltanelloides.

The chemical signature obtained from organically preserved specimens points to a cyanobacterial affinity (cf. Nostoc). They are often found in high abundance in monospecific clusters.
