= List of Ediacaran genera =

Fossilised Precambrian life forms

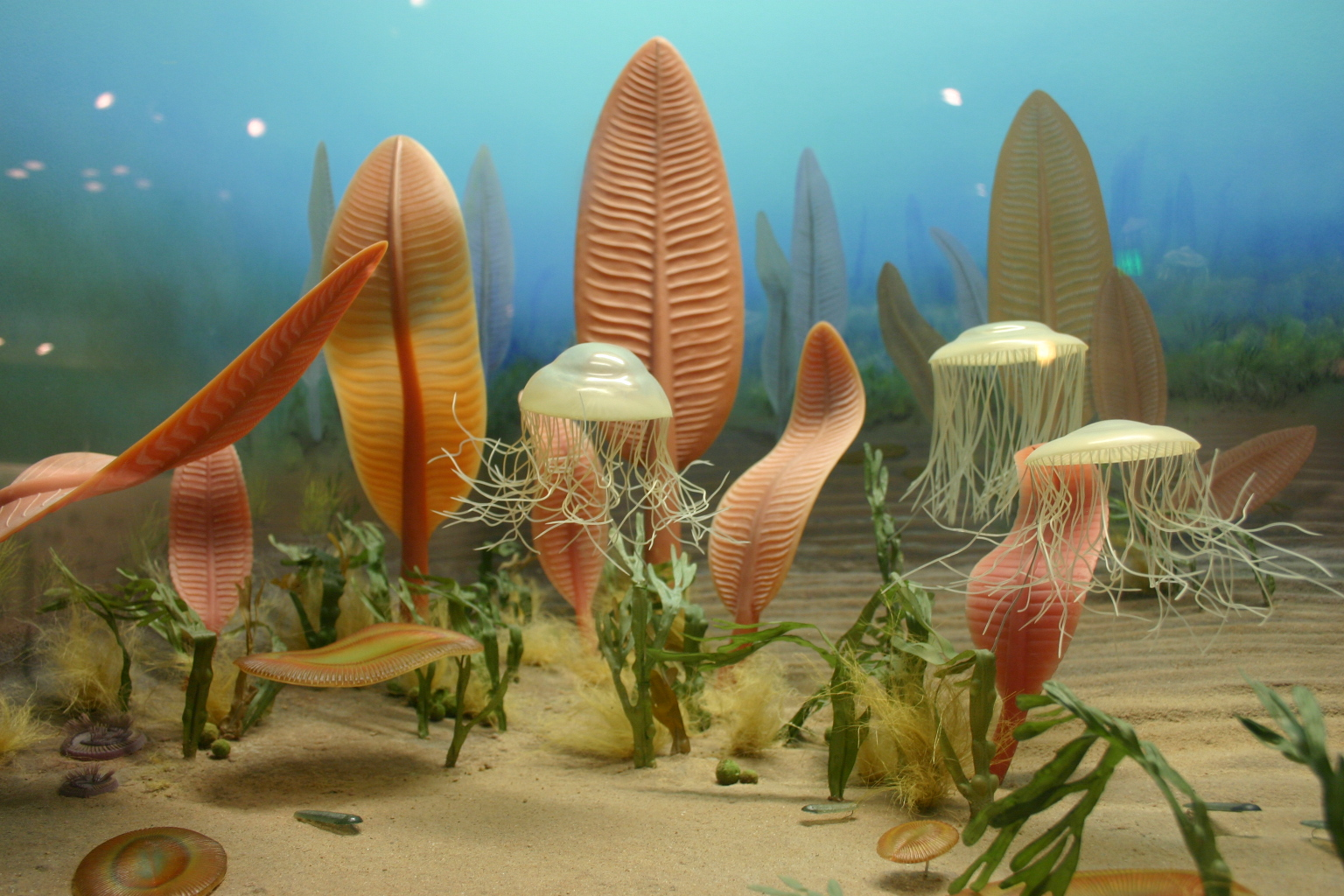
Hypothetical reconstruction of life in the Ediacaran sea

The existence of life, especially that of animals, before the Cambrian had long been the subject of debate in paleontology. The apparent suddenness of the Cambrian explosion had no firm explanation, and Charles Darwin himself recognized the challenge it posed for his theory of evolution. While reports of Precambrian organisms have been made since Alexander Murray's 1868 discovery of Aspidella, considerable evidence of Precambrian life had not been presented until the discovery of Charnia in 1956.

The period immediately preceding the Cambrian, the Ediacaran, is now widely accepted of containing animal life. It spans from 635 to 540 million years ago, and covers approximately 2% of Earth's history. Taxonomists have purported a total of 313 described genera from the Ediacaran, 207 of which are accepted as valid. (Note: Mark McMenamin described various taxa from the Clemente Formation in Mexico which are not supported by other researchers and not included in this list.)

== Key ==
- Valid genus - Genera that are accepted by the scientific community
- Junior synonym - Alternative name for an already existing genus
- Unknown status - Unclear if it actually represents a unique organism
- Invalid - Genera that do not represent an actual fossil organism, or are taphonomic varieties of others

== List ==
Name	Authority	Year	Affinity	Validity	Notes	Country
Akrophyllas	Grimes et al.	2023	Petalonamae			Australia
Albumares	Fedonkin	1976	Trilobozoa			Russia
Alienum	Liu et al.	2024	Vetulicolia?			China
Amorphia	Grytsenko	2016				Ukraine
Anabylia	Vodanjuk	1989			Discoid fossil with no clear diagnostic characters	Russia
Andiva	Fedonkin	2002	Proarticulata			Russia
Anfesta	Fedonkin	1984	Trilobozoa			Russia
Aninoides	Rosse‐Guillevic et al.	2025	Petalonamae			Canada
Annularidens	Ouyang et al.	2020	Acritarcha			China
Annulatubus	Carbone et al.	2015				Canada
Annulusichnus	Zhang	1986			Junior synonym of Gaojiashania, tubular fossil	China
Anulitubus	Moczydłowska in Moczydłowska et al.	2021				Norway
Arborea	Glaessner et Wade	1966	Petalonamae		Was considered a junior synonym of Charniodiscus, now thought to be a colonial eumetazoan unrelated to rangeomorphs	Australia
Archaeaspinus	Ivantsov	2007	Proarticulata			Russia
Archaeichnium	Glaessner	1963			Tubular conical fossil	Namibia
Archangelia	Fedonkin	1979	Petalonamae?		Bilaterally symmetric organism with ovoid shape, and midline axial zone.	Russia
Arimasia	Runnegar et al.	2024	Porifera		Early sponge, possibly a member of Archaeocyatha	Namibia
Arkarua	Gehling	1987	Echinodermata?		Has 5-sided symmetry similar to modern echinoderms	Australia
Armillifera	Fedonkin	1980	Proarticulata			Russia
Arumberia	Glaessner et Walter	1975				Australia Ukraine
Askinica	Bekker	1996			Discoid fossil with no clear diagnostic characters	Russia
Aspidella	Billings	1872			Biradial discoid fossil	Canada
Astra	Grytsenko	2016				Ukraine
Atakia	Palij	1979				Ukraine
Attenborites	Droser et al.	2018				Australia Moldova
Aulozoon	Gehling et Runnegar	2021				Australia
Auroralumina	Dunn et al.	2022	Cnidaria			UK
Ausia	Hahn et Pflug	1985	Tunicata?			Namibia
Avalofractus	Narbonne, Laflamme, Greentree et Trusler	2009	Petalonamae			Canada
Aviculaichnus	Grytsenko	2009	Trace fossil		Junior synonym of Nenoxites	Ukraine
Baikalina	Sokolov	1972			Junior synonym of Ernietta	Russia
Barmia	Bekker	1996			Discoid fossil with no clear diagnostic characters	Russia
Beltanella	Sprigg	1947			Discoid fossil with no clear diagnostic characters	Australia
Beltanelliformis	Menner	1974	Cyanobacterial colony		Discoid fossil	Russia
Beltanelloides	Sokolov	1972			Nomen nudum, synonym of Beltanelliformis	Russia
Beothukis	Brasier et Antcliffe	2009	Petalonamae			Canada
Bernashevia	Grytsenko	2016				Ukraine
Bessarabia	Gureev	1988			Discoid fossil with no clear diagnostic characters	Moldova
Bilinichnus	Fedonkin et Palij	1979	Trace fossil		Trace fossil or pseudofossil	Russia
Bjarmia	Grazhdankin	2016	Scyphozoa			Russia
Blackbrookia	Boynton et Ford	1995			Rejected as valid taxon, "ivesheadiomorph"-type fossil structure	UK
Bomakellia	Fedonkin	1985	Petalonamae		Possible junior synonym of Rangea	Russia
Bonata	Fedonkin	1980				Russia
Brachina	Wade	1972				Australia
Bradgatia	Boynton et Ford	1995	Petalonamae			UK
Broccoliforma	Mason et Narbonne	2016	Petalonamae?			Canada
Bronicella	Zaika-Novatsky	1965			Discoid fossil with no clear diagnostic characters	Ukraine
Buchholzbrunnichnus	Germs	1973	Trace fossil			Namibia
Bunyerichnus	Glaessner	1969			Pseudofossil	Australia
Burykhia	Fedonkin, Vickers-Rich, Swalla, Trusler et Hall	2012	Tunicata?			Russia
Calyptrina	Sokolov	1965	Annelida?		Tubular fossil	Russia
Catellichnus	Bekker	1989	Palaeopascichnida			Russia
Catenasphaerophyton	Yan et al.	1992	Palaeopascichnida			China
Cephalonega	Fedonkin in Fedonkin et al.	2019	Proarticulata			Russia
Charnia	Ford	1958	Petalonamae			UK
Charniodiscus	Ford	1958	Petalonamae			UK
Chondroplon	Wade	1971			Probably a junior synonym of Dickinsonia	Australia
Cloudina	Germs	1972	Annelida?		Tubular fossil	Namibia
Cocardia	Grytsenko	2016				Ukraine
Colinetia	Fitzgerald et al.	2026				Canada
Coniculus	Moczydłowska in Moczydłowska et al.	2021				Norway
Conomedusites	Glaessner et Wade	1966	Cnidaria?			Australia
Conotubus	Zhang et Lin	1986			Tubular fossil	China
Convolutubus	Vaziri et al.	2020			Tubular fossil	Iran
Coronacollina	Clites, Droser et Gehling	2012	Porifera?			Australia
Corumbella	Hahn, Hahn, Leonardos, Pflug et Walde	1982			Tubular fossil	Brazil
Costatubus	Selly et al.	2020			Tubular fossil	USA
Crassimembrana	Ouyang et al.	2020	Acritarcha			China
Culmofrons	Laflamme et al.	2012	Petalonamae			Canada
Curviacus	Shen et al.	2017	Palaeopascichnida			China
Cyanorus	Ivantsov	2004	Proarticulata			Russia
Cyathinema	Agić et al.	2019				Norway
Cyclomedusa	Sprigg	1947			Discoid fossil with no clear diagnostic characters	Australia Ukraine Moldova
Cycliomedusa	Zhao et al.	2025			Discoid fossil	China
Dactyloichnus	Grytsenko	2016	Trace fossil			Ukraine
Dengyingia	Chen et al.	2026				China
Dickinsonia	Sprigg	1947	Proarticulata			Australia
Ediacaria	Sprigg	1947			Discoid fossil with no clear diagnostic characters	Australia Ukraine
Elainabella	Rowland et Rodriguez	2014	Viridiplantae?		Multicellular alga	USA
Elasenia	Fedonkin	1983				Ukraine
Eoandromeda	Tang, Yin, Bengtson, Liu, Wang et Gao	2008	Ctenophora?			China
Eocyathispongia	Yin et al.	2015	Porifera?		Small 3 chambered sponge-like organism	China
Eoporpita	Wade	1972				Australia
Epibaion	Ivantsov	2002	Trace fossil		Grazing traces of Proarticulata	Russia
Ernietta	Pflug	1966	Petalonamae			Namibia
Erniaster	Pflug	1972	Petalonamae		Junior synonym of Ernietta	Namibia
Erniobaris	Pflug	1972	Petalonamae		Junior synonym of Ernietta	Namibia
Erniobeta	Pflug	1972	Petalonamae		Junior synonym of Ernietta	Namibia
Erniocarpus	Pflug	1972	Petalonamae		Junior synonym of Ernietta	Namibia
Erniocentris	Pflug	1972	Petalonamae		Junior synonym of Ernietta	Namibia
Erniocoris	Pflug	1972	Petalonamae		Junior synonym of Ernietta	Namibia
Erniodiscus	Pflug	1972	Petalonamae		Junior synonym of Ernietta	Namibia
Erniofossa	Pflug	1972	Petalonamae		Junior synonym of Ernietta	Namibia
Erniograndis	Pflug	1972	Petalonamae		Junior synonym of Ernietta	Namibia
Ernionorma	Pflug	1972	Petalonamae		Junior synonym of Ernietta	Namibia
Erniopelta	Pflug	1972	Petalonamae		Junior synonym of Ernietta	Namibia
Erniotaxis	Pflug	1972	Petalonamae		Junior synonym of Ernietta	Namibia
Estrella	Liu et Moczydłowska	2019	Acritarcha		A microfossil	China
Evmiaksia	Fedonkin	1984			Discoid fossil with no clear diagnostic characters	Russia
Fedomia	Serezhnikova et Ivantsov	2007	Porifera?			Russia
Finkoella	Martyshyn	2021	Tunicata?			Ukraine
Fistula	Moczydłowska in Moczydłowska et al.	2021			Not Fistula (Moerch, 1853), replaced by Silicofistula	Norway
Flavostratum	Serezhnikova	2013				Russia
Fractofusus	Gehling et Narbonne	2007	Petalonamae			Canada
Frondophyllas	Bamforth et Narbonne	2009	Petalonamae			Canada
Funisia	Droser et Gehling	2008	Porifera?		Tubular fossil	Australia
Ganarake	Retallack	2022	Lichen?		First interpreted as tubestones, now thought to be earliest preserved remains of a lichen	USA
Gaojiashania	Yang, Zhang et Lin	1986	Annelida?		Tubular fossil	China
Garania	Bekker	1996			Discoid fossil with no clear diagnostic characters	Russia
Gehlingia	McMenamin	1998				Australia
Gibbavasis	Vaziri, Majidifard et Laflamme	2018	Tunicata?		Small, oval-shaped form similar to Ausia fenestrata	Iran
Gigarimaneta	Taylor et al.	2021	Petalonamae			Canada
Glaessnerina	Germs	1973	Petalonamae		Junior synonym of Charnia	Australia
Gritcenia	Menasova	2003			Junior synonym of Nimbia	Ukraine
Gureevella	Menasova	2003				Ukraine
Hadrynichorde	Hofmann, O'Brien et King	2008				Canada
Hadryniscala	Hofmann, O'Brien et King	2008				Canada
Hagenetta	Hahn et Pflug	1988			Junior synonym of Beltanelliformis	Namibia
Hallidaya	Wade	1969	Trilobozoa			Australia
Haootia	Liu et al.	2014	Cnidaria			Canada
Harlaniella	Sokolov	1972	Vendotaenid		Tubular fossil	Ukraine
Hapsidophyllas	Bamforth et Narbonne	2009	Petalonamae			Canada
Helicolocellus	Wang et al.	2024	Porifera		Likely a hexactinellid	China
Hiemalora	Fedonkin	1982				Russia
Houjiashania	Liu et al.	2023	Phaeophyceae?			China
Hylaecullulus	Kenchington, Dunn & Wilby	2018	Petalonamae		Multifoliate Petalonamid similar to Primocandelabrum and Bradgatia.	UK
Ichnusa	Debrenne et Naud	1981	Cnidaria			Italy
Ikaria	Evans et al.	2020	Bilateria		Stem-bilateran	Australia
Inaria	Gehling	1988				Australia
Inkrylovia	Fedonkin	1979			Junior synonym of Onegia	Russia
Intrites	Fedonkin	1980	Palaeopascichnida			Russia
Irridinitus	Fedonkin	1983			Discoid fossil with no clear diagnostic characters	Ukraine
Ivesheadia	Boynton et Ford	1995			Rejected as valid taxon, "ivesheadiomorph"-type fossil structure	UK
Ivovicia	Ivantsov	2007	Proarticulata			Russia
Jampolium	Gureev	1988			Discoid fossil with no clear diagnostic characters	Ukraine
Kaisalia	Fedonkin	1984			Discoid fossil with no clear diagnostic characters	Russia
Karakhtia	Ivantsov	2004	Proarticulata			Russia
Keretsa	Ivantsov	2017				Russia
Khatyspytia	Fedonkin	1985	Petalonamae			Russia
Kimberella	Wade	1972	Mollusca?			Australia
Kimberia	Glaessner et Wade	1966	Mollusca?		Not Kimberia (Cotton & Woods, 1935), replaced by Kimberella	Australia
Kimberichnus	Ivantsov	2013	Trace fossil		Grazing traces of Kimberella	Russia
Komarovia	Grytsenko	2016			Not to be confused with Komarovia, extant genus of flowering plant.	Ukraine
Kuibisia	Hahn et Pflug	1985				Namibia
Kuckaraukia	Ivantsov, Novikov et Razumovskiy	2015				Russia
Ladariella	Diniz et Leme in Diniz, Leme et Boggiani	2021			A macroalga of uncertain phylogenetic placement, possibly related to the family Eoholyniaceae.	Brazil
Ladariophyton	Diniz et Leme in Diniz, Leme et Boggiani	2021			A macroalga of uncertain phylogenetic placement, possibly related to the family Eoholyniaceae.	Brazil
Lagoenaforma	Agić et al.	2021			A flask-shaped microfossil.	Canada Namibia Norway
Laminasphaera	Liu et Moczydłowska	2019	Acritarcha		A microfossil	China
Lamonte	Meyer, Xiao, Gill, Schiffbauer, Chen, Zhou et Yuan	2014	Trace fossil			China
Lanceaphyton	Wang et al.	2021			A high-level eukaryotic macroalga.	China
Lantianella	Wan et al.	2016			Putative animal, bears similarities to conulariids	China
Lobodiscus	Zhao et al.	2024	Trilobozoa			China
Lomoziella	Grytsenko	2016				Ukraine
Lomosovis	Fedonkin	1983				Ukraine
Longbizuiella	Yi et al.	2022			Junior synonym of Horodyskia	China
Lorenzinites	Glaessner et Wade	1966	Trilobozoa		Junior synonym of Rugoconites	Australia
Lossinia	Ivantsov	2007	Proarticulata			Russia
Lydonia	Pasinetti et al.	2025				Canada
Madigania	Sprigg	1949			Not Madigania (Whitley, 1945), replaced by Spriggia	Australia
Mamsetia	McIlroy et al.	2024	Cnidaria			Canada
Margaritiflabellum	Ivantsov	2014				Russia
Marywadea	Glaessner	1976	Proarticulata			Australia
Mawsonites	Glaessner et Wade	1966				Australia
Maxiphyton	Ye et al.	2019				China
Medusinites	Glaessner et Wade	1966			Discoid fossil with no clear diagnostic characters	Australia
Medvezichnus	Fedonkin	1985	Trace fossil		Unique specimen of doubtful nature	Russia
Membranosphaera	Liu et Moczydłowska	2019	Acritarcha		Not Membranosphaera Samoilovitch in Samoilovitch and Mtchedlishvili, 1961, replaced by Membranospinosphaera	China
Membranospinosphaera	Shang et Liu	2024	Acritarcha			China
Mezenia	Sokolov	1976				Russia
Mialsemia	Fedonkin	1985	Petalonamae		Junior synonym of Bomakellia (or Rangea)	Russia
Miettia	Hofmann et Mountjoy	2010	Petalonamae			Canada
Nadalina	Narbonne et Hofmann	1987			Discoid fossil with no clear diagnostic characters	Canada
Namacalathus	Grotzinger, Watters, et Knoll	2000	Lophotrochozoa?			Namibia
Namalia	Germs	1968				Namibia
Namamedusium	Zessin	2008			Junior synonym of Beltanelliformis	Namibia
Namapoikia	Wood, Grotzinger et Dickson	2002				Namibia
Nasepia	Germs	1973				Namibia
Nemiana	Palij	1976			Junior synonym of Beltanelliformis	Ukraine Moldova
Nenoxites	Fedonkin	1976	Trace fossil			Russia
Nepia	Golubkova in Golubkova et Kochnev	2020	Cyanobacteria		An oscillatorian cyanobacteria.	Russia
Nilpenia	Droser et al.	2014				Australia
Nimbia	Fedonkin	1980				Russia
Noffkarkys	Retallack et Broz	2020				Australia
Obamus	Dzaugis, Evans, Droser, Gehling et Hughes	2018				Australia
Olgerdina	Grytsenko	2016				Ukraine
Olgunia	Luzhnaya	2025	Porifera?			Russia
Onega	Fedonkin	1976	Proarticulata		Not Onega (Distant, 1908), replaced by Cephalonega	Russia
Onegia	Sokolov	1976				Russia
Orbisiana	Sokolov	1976	Palaeopascichnida			Russia
Orthogonium	Gürich	1930				Namibia
Ostiosphaera	Yin et al.	2021			An embryo-like fossil of a eukaryote of uncertain affinities, possibly a holozoan.	China
Otavia	Brain et al.	2012	Porifera?			Namibia
Ovatoscutum	Glaessner et Wade	1966	Proarticulata			Australia
Palaeopascichnus	Palij	1976	Palaeopascichnida			Ukraine
Palaeophragmodictya	Gehling et Rigby	1996				Australia
Palaeorhopalon	Dai et al.	2024			Tubular fossil	China
Palaeospinther	Menasova	2003				Ukraine
Palaeoplatoda	Fedonkin	1979				Russia
Paliella	Fedonkin	1980			Discoid fossil with no clear diagnostic characters	Russia
Pambikalbae	Jenkins et Nedin	2007				Australia
Papilionata	Sprigg	1947	Proarticulata		Junior synonym of Dickinsonia	Australia
Paracharnia	Sun	1986	Petalonamae			China
Paramackenzia	Zhao et al.	2021	Mackenziid			China
Paramedusium	Gürich	1933			Discoid fossil with no clear diagnostic characters	Namibia
Paravendia	Ivantsov	2004	Proarticulata			Russia
Parvancorina	Glaessner	1958				Australia
Parviscopa	Hofmann, O'Brien et King	2008	Petalonamae			Canada
Pectinifrons	Bamforth, Narbonne et Anderson	2008	Petalonamae			Canada
Persimedusites	Hahn et Pflug	1980				Iran
Petalostroma	Pflug	1973			Rejected as valid taxon	Namibia
Pharyngomorpha	Martyshyn et Uchman	2021	Tunicata?			Ukraine
Phyllozoon	Jenkins et Gehling	1978	Proarticulata			Australia
Pinegia	Fedonkin	1980			Not Pinegia (Martynov, 1928), replaced by Hiemalora	Russia
Piyuania	Wan et al.	2016			Putative animal, bears similarities to Cnidaria	China
Planomedusites	Sokolov	1972			Discoid fossil with no clear diagnostic characters	Ukraine
Platypholinia	Fedonkin	1985				Russia
Plexus	Joel, Droser & Gehling	2014	Bilateria		Although more studies are needed, it has been identified as bilaterian.	Australia
Plumeropriscum	Mason et Narbonne	2016	Petalonamae			Canada
Podolimirus	Fedonkin	1983	Proarticulata			Ukraine
Podoliina	Gureev	1988			Junior synonym of Nenoxites	Ukraine
Pollukia	Gureev	1987			Discoid fossil with no clear diagnostic characters	Ukraine
Pomoria	Fedonkin	1980	Trilobozoa		Junior synonym of Tribrachidium	Russia
Poratusiramus	Yi et al.	2022				China
Portfjeldia	Willman & Peel	2022			Tubular fossil	Greenland
Praecambridium	Glaessner et Wade	1966	Proarticulata			Australia
Primocandelabrum	Hofmann, O'Brien et King	2008	Petalonamae			Canada
Propaleolina	Menasova	2003			Tubular fossil	Ukraine
Protechiurus	Glaessner	1979	Cnidaria?			Namibia
Protocodium	Chai, Aria et Hua	2022	Codiaceae			China
Protoconites	Chen, Xiao and Yuan	1994	Cnidaria?		Conical organism with possible affinites to Cnidaria	China
Protodipleurosoma	Sprigg	1949			Discoid fossil with no clear diagnostic characters	Australia
Protoniobia	Sprigg	1949			Discoid fossil with no clear diagnostic characters	Australia
Pseudohiemaloraichnus	Grytsenko	2009	Trace fossil		Junior synonym of Nenoxites	Ukraine
Pseudorhizostomites	Sprigg	1949			Problematic biogenic structure	Australia
Pseudorhopilema	Sprigg	1949			Junior synonym of Pseudorhizostomites	Australia
Pseudovendia	Boynton et Ford	1979			Rejected as valid taxon, "ivesheadiomorph"-type fossil structures	UK
Pteridinium	Gürich	1933	Petalonamae			Namibia
Qianchuania	Wan et al.	2016			Putative animal, bears similarities to Cnidaria	China
Quaestio	Evans et al.	2024				Australia
Ramellina	Fedonkin	1980				Russia
Rangea	Gürich	1929	Petalonamae			Namibia
Redkinia	Sokolov	1977				Russia
Rugoconites	Glaessner et Wade	1966	Trilobozoa			Australia
Saarina	Sokolov	1965			Tubular fossil	Russia
Seirisphaera	Chen, Xiao et Yuan	1996	Palaeopascichnida		Junior synonym of Orbisiana	China
Sekwia	Hofmann	1981			Discoid fossil with no clear diagnostic characters	Canada
Sekwitubulus	Carbone et al.	2015			Tubular fossil	Canada
Serebrina	Istchenko	1983				Ukraine
Shaanxilithes	Xing et al,	1984			Previously considered a junior synonym of Nenoxites and Gaojiashania	China
Shepshedia	Boynton et Ford	1995			Rejected as valid taxon, "ivesheadiomorph"-type fossil structure	UK
Shufangtubulus	Dai et Hua in Dai et al.	2024			Tubular fossil	China
Silicofistula	Moczydłowska in Moczydłowska et al.	2021				Norway
Sinotubulites	Chen, Chen et Qian	1981			Tubular fossil	China
Skinnera	Wade	1969	Trilobozoa			Australia
Skolithos declinatus	Fedonkin	1985	Trace fossil			Russia
Solza	Ivantsov	2004				Russia
Somatohelix	Sappenfield, Droser et Gehling	2011			Tubular fossil	Australia
Spinomargosphaera	Shang et Liu	2024	Acritarcha			China
Sporosphaera	Landon et al.	2019				China
Spriggia	Southcott	1958			Discoid fossil with no clear diagnostic characters	Australia
Spriggina	Glaessner	1958	Proarticulata			Australia
Staurinidia	Fedonkin	1985	Cnidaria			Russia
Stellaria	Grytsenko	2016			Not to be confused with Stellaria, extant genus of flowering plant.	Ukraine
Streptichnus	Jensen et Runnegar	2005	Vendotaenid or Trace fossil			Namibia
Studenicia	Gureev	1983			Putative Monocraterion trace fossil	Ukraine
Suzmites	Fedonkin	1981			Junior synonym of Onegia	Russia
Swartpuntia	Narbonne, Saylor et Grotzinger	1997	Petalonamae			Namibia
Tamengophyton	Diniz et Leme in Diniz, Leme et Boggiani	2021			A macroalga of uncertain phylogenetic placement, possibly related to the family Eoholyniaceae.	Brazil
Tamga	Ivantsov	2007	Proarticulata			Russia
Tateana	Sprigg	1949			Discoid fossil with no clear diagnostic characters	Australia
Temnoxa	Ivantsov	2004	Mollusca?			Russia
Thectardis	Clapham, Narbonne, Gehling, Greentree et Anderson	2004	Porifera?			Canada
Tirasiana	Palij	1976			Discoid fossil with no clear diagnostic characters	Ukraine Moldova
Trepassia	Narbonne, Laflamme, Greentree et Trusler	2009	Petalonamae			Canada
Tribrachidium	Glaessner	1959	Trilobozoa			Australia
Triforillonia	Gehling, Narbonne et Anderson	2000			Deformed Aspidella	Canada
Tulaneia	Runnegar et Horodyski	2025	Petalonamae			USA
Tungusia	Kolosov et Okhlopkova	2024	Fungi			Russia
Tymkivia	Martyshyn	2023				Ukraine
Uncus	Hughes, Evans et Droser	2024	Ecdysozoa		Possible stem nematoid	Australia
Vaizitsinia	Sokolov et Fedonkin	1981	Petalonamae		Junior synonym of Rangea	Russia
Valdainia	Fedonkin	1983	Proarticulata		Junior synonym of Podolimirus	Ukraine
Vaveliksia	Fedonkin	1983	Porifera?			Ukraine
Velancorina	Pflug	1966				Namibia
Velocephalina	Coutts et al.				This taxon was described in 2019 exclusively in a PhD thesis, therefore it is not recognized as valid and is considered nomen ineditum.	Australia
Vendella	Gureev	1987			Discoid fossil with no clear diagnostic characters	Ukraine
Vendia	Keller	1969	Proarticulata			Russia
Vendichnus	Fedonkin	1979			Possible pseudofossil	Russia
Vendoconularia	Ivantsov et Fedonkin	2002	Conulata			Russia
Vendoglossa	Seilacher	2007			Junior synonym of Protechiurus	Namibia
Vendomia	Keller	1976	Proarticulata		Junior synonym of Dickinsonia	Russia
Vendomyces	M. B. Burzin	1993	Chytridiomycetes			Russia
Vendotaenia	Gnilovskaya	1971	Vendotaenid		Tubular fossil	Russia
Ventogyrus	Ivantsov et Grazhdankin	1997	Ctenophora?			Russia
Veprina	Fedonkin	1980	Trace fossil			Russia
Vernanimalcula	Chen	2004	Acritarcha		Possibly a pseudofossil.	China
Verrucosphaera	Liu et Moczydłowska	2019	Acritarcha		Not Verrucosphaera Górka, 1970, replaced by Spinomargosphaera	China
Vimenites	Fedonkin	1980				Russia
Vinlandia	Brasier, Antcliffe et Liu	2012	Petalonamae			Canada
Virgatia	Grytsenko	2016				Ukraine
Vladimissa	Fedonkin	1985				Russia
Wigwamiella	Runnegar	1991			Discoid fossil with no clear diagnostic characters. Regarded as a taphomorph of Aspidella or junior synonym for Pseudorhizostomites	Australia
Windermeria	Narbonne	1994	Proarticulata			Canada
Wutubus	Chen, Zhou, Xiao, Wang, Guan, Hong et Yuan	2014			Tubular fossil	China
Yangtziramulus	Shen, Xiao, Zhou et Yuan	2009				China
Yarnemia	Nesov in Chistyakov et al.	1984	Tunicata?			Russia
Yelovichnus	Fedonkin	1985	Palaeopascichnida		Junior synonym of Palaeopascichnus	Russia
Yorgia	Ivantsov	1999	Proarticulata			Russia
Yilingia	Xiao et al.	2019	Bilateria			China
Yuria	Grytsenko	2016				Ukraine
Zolotytsia	Fedonkin	1981				Russia
Zuunia	Yang et al.	2020	Annelida?		A cloudinid.	Mongolia
