= List of White Sea biota species by phylum =

This is a List of White Sea species, ordered by suspected phylum.

== ?Incertae sedis ==
3 species

Incertae sedis organisms of the White Sea
Taxa	Presence	Notes	Images
Animalia: (incertae sedis): Cyclomedusa; 1. C. davidii			Cyclomedusa
?Porifera: (incertae sedis): Palaeophragmodictya			Cyclomedusa
?Dickinsoniidae: (incertae sedis): Chondroplon; 1. C. bilobatum			Cyclomedusa

== Phylum ?Arthropoda ==
1 species

?Arthropodas of the White Sea
Taxa	Presence	Notes	Images
?Arthropoda: (incertae sedis): Parvancorina; 1. P. minchami 2. P. sagita			Parvancorina

== Phylum ?Cnidaria ==
1 species

?Cnidarias of the White Sea
Taxa	Presence	Notes	Images
Class: ?Anthozoa; 1. Inaria			Inaria

== Erniettomorphs ==
1 species

Erniettomorphs of the White Sea
Taxa	Presence	Notes	Images
Genus: (incertae sedis): Pteridinium			Pteridinium

== Phylum ?Mollusca ==
1 species

?Mollusca of the White Sea
Taxa	Presence	Notes	Images
Genus: Kimberella; 1. K. quadrata			Fossil of Kimberella quadrata Kimberella

== Phylum ?Porifera ==
1 species.

?Porifera-(sea sponges) of the White Sea
Taxa	Presence	Notes	Images
Genus: Vaveliksia; 1. V. velikanovi			Vaveliksia

== Phylum Proarticulata ==
3 species

?Proarticulata of the White Sea
Taxa	Presence	Notes	Images
Genus: Cephalonega; 1. C. stepanovi			Cephalonega Tamga Yorgia Yorgia
Genus: Tamga; 1. T. hamulifera			Cephalonega Tamga Yorgia Yorgia
Genus: Yorgia; 1. Y. waggoneri			Cephalonega Tamga Yorgia Yorgia

== Phylum Rangeomorpha ==
3 species

?Rangeomorpha of the White Sea
Taxa	Presence	Notes	Images
Genus: Bomakellia; 1. B. kelleri			Bomakellia Bomakellia kelleri reconstructed here as a proto-arthropod in yellow and green. Charniodiscus Dickinsonia D. costata
?Rangeomorpha: (incertae sedis): Charniodiscus; 1. spp multiples			Bomakellia Bomakellia kelleri reconstructed here as a proto-arthropod in yellow and green. Charniodiscus Dickinsonia D. costata
Genus: Dickinsonia; 1. 5 species			Bomakellia Bomakellia kelleri reconstructed here as a proto-arthropod in yellow and green. Charniodiscus Dickinsonia D. costata

== Phylum Trilobozoa ==
1 species

Trilobozoa of the White Sea
Taxa	Presence	Notes	Images
Genus: Tribrachidium; 1. Tribrachidium heraldicum			Fossil of Tribrachidium heraldicum Reconstruction

== Alphabetical listing ==
- Bomakellia
- Bonata septata
- Cephalonega
- Charniodiscus
- Chondroplon
- Cyclomedusa
- Dickinsonia
- Inaria
- Kimberella
- Palaeophragmodictya
- Parvancorina
- Pteridinium
- Tamga (Genus)
- Tribrachidium
- Vaveliksia
- Yorgia

== See also ==
- Vendia
- Odontogriphus
