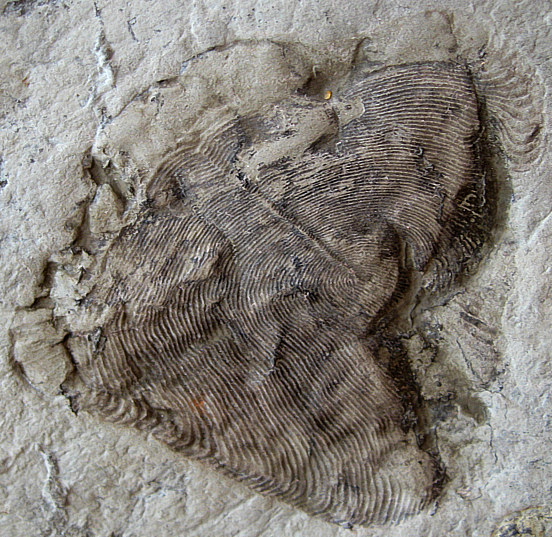
- Fossil of Andiva ivantsovi

Scientific classification
- Kingdom: Animalia
- Phylum: †Proarticulata
- Genus: †Andiva; Fedonkin, 2002
- Species: †A. ivantsovi

Binomial name
- †Andiva ivantsovi Fedonkin 2002

= Andiva =

Andiva Temporal range: Ediacaran, around 555 Ma

Vendian fossil

Andiva ivantsovi is a Vendian fossil, identified to be a bilaterian triploblastic animal in the Ediacaran phylum Proarticulata, known from the Winter Coast, White Sea, Russia. It was first discovered in 1977, and described as a new species in a new genus by Mikhail Fedonkin in 2002. It lived about 555 million years ago. Fossils of Andiva also occur in South Australia. All known fossils of Andiva are external molds.

== Description ==
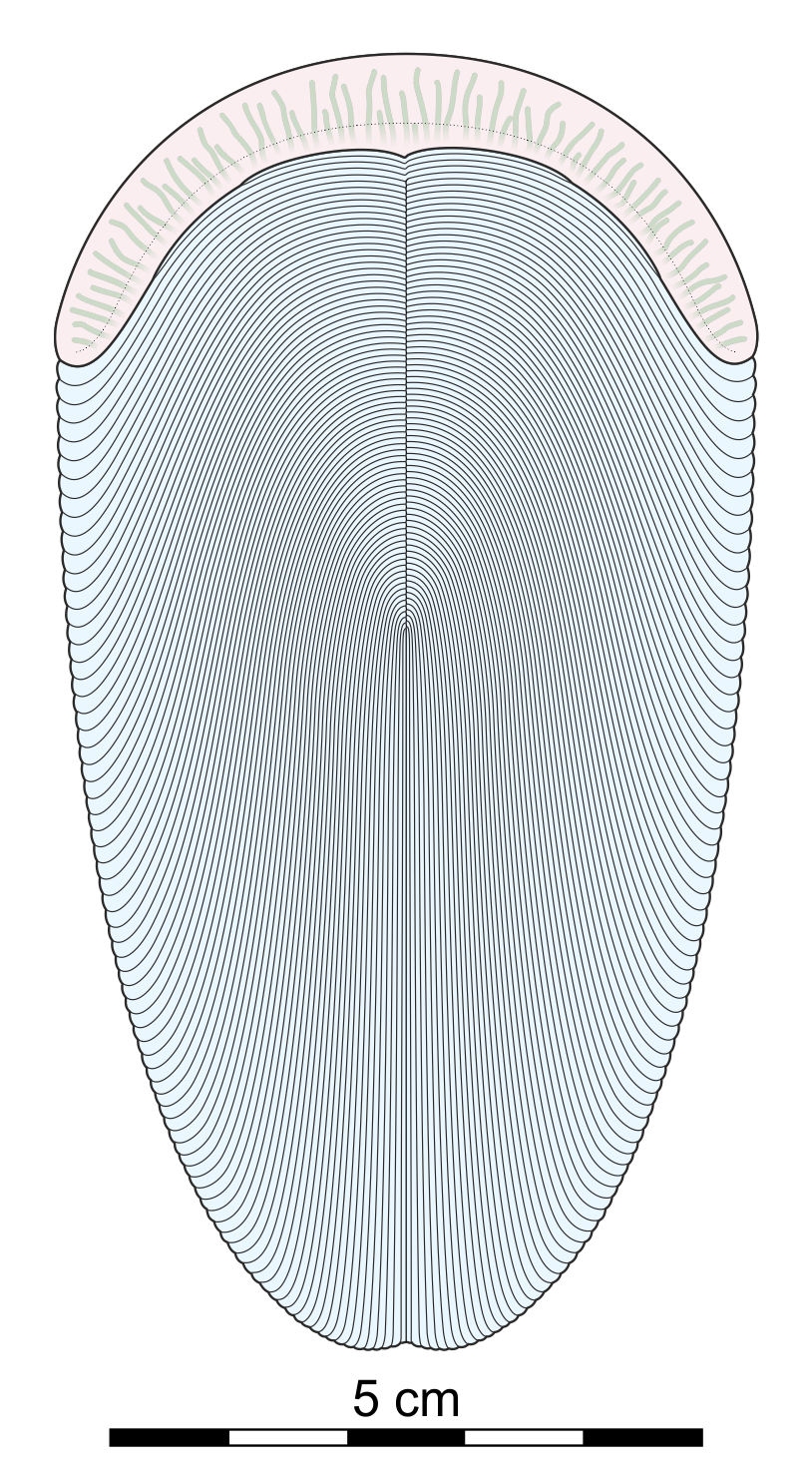
Sketch reconstruction of the Andiva ivantsovi

Andiva was between 6 and 10 cm (2.4 and 3.9 in) long and from 4 to 5.5 cm (1.6 to 2.2 in) wide, with a bilaterally symmetrical shape, larger on the anterior end and narrower at the posterior. The anterior part features a smooth "fringe" followed by a surface "covered by fine ribs and sutura", also described as a "quilt" with narrow, tightly packed chambers The symmetry of these ribs is a glide symmetry, that is, in which the corresponding segments on the left and right sides do not line up, but are staggered. This is a feature shared by other forms belonging to the proposed taxon Proarticulata.

The original reconstruction by Fedonkin proposed that the ridged surface was a convex, thin carapace made of a chitin-like, non mineralized substance, protecting the animal while "creeping or gliding" over the sea bed. In the same reconstruction, the smooth zone was considered an imprint of the soft tissue beneath the dorsal carapace.

== Association ==
Andiva is often found together with other species from the Ediacara biota, like Dickinsonia, Yorgia, Kimberella, Parvancorina, Tribrachidium and others.

== Taxonomy and relationships ==
- Dipleurozoa
  - Dickinsonia
  - - Spriggina
    - - Yorgia, Praecambridium, Archaeaspinus, Vendia
      - Chondroplon, Andiva

Proposed cladogram of the relationships between Dipleurozoa, according to Dzik (2003)

Morphologically, Andiva most closely resembles Ovatoscutum, Chondroplon, and, more distantly, Dickinsonia, as part of the proposed phylum Proarticulata. Archaeaspinus and Cyanorus have also been directly compared to it.

Jerzy Dzik includes Andiva in the Dipleurozoa, with Chondroplon as the closest relative, separated from Dickinsonia and closer to Yorgia, Praecambridium, Archaeaspinus, and Vendia, since all of them share a dextrally bent dorsal medial chamber.

== See also ==
- List of Ediacaran genera
