= Orthogonium =

Orthogonium Temporal range: Ediacaran, 635–542 Ma

Scientific classification
- Domain: Incertae sedis
- Genus: †Orthogonium; Gürich, 1930
- Species: †O. parallelum

Binomial name
- †Orthogonium parallelum Gürich, 1930

Extinct genus of Ediacaran lifeform

Orthogonium is a genus of Ediacaran fauna approximately 550-530 million years old. Because of its taphonomy and likeness to other Ediacaran fauna, and as well as to crinoids, paleontologists dispute its classification.

== Description ==
The fossil consists of 8 parallel rows of tubes, which are square in cross-section, lying parallel to bedding. These tubes are divided into sections, the longest preserved tube is 58 mm long with 28, mesh-like sections, each of which is 2 mm high and 3 mm wide. Each section is separated from adjacent sections by a defined groove. These square section tubes may represent original pneu structures that did not collapse during fossilization and were filled with sediment, preserving the three-dimensional form of the structure.

The fossil resembles several others, particularly Ectenocrinus simplex. This comparison was made by Gürich, who compared the tubes to the likeness of the arms of the crinoids. Mikhail Fedonkin, classified O. parallelum as a quilted petalonam because of its unique preservation. “They resemble sand-filled rocks which were composed of several tubes, often constricted midway by a prominent surface, but what these structures represent is uncertain.” J. John Sepkoski classified Orthogonium as a member of the subphylum Medusae with sister taxa including Bonata, Inaria, and Bronicella.

== Diversity ==
Only one species is known to exist, Orthogonium parallelum.

== Discovery ==
The fossil was discovered in 1930 by Georg Gürich in the Kuibis Quartzite, Nama Group in the Nama foreland basin of Namibia.

== Distribution ==
Within the formation, alluvial plain deposition grades into sandstones which originated from channels and deltas along a shoreline. The overlying shales in the formation were deposited offshore, and the mud cracks, clasts, and gypsum characterizing the area indicate a tidal deposition. The formation has been dated to 530±10 Mya through K-Ar radiometric dating.

== Ecology ==
As there is no consensus as to the classification of Orthogonium, and as opinions range from crinoid to jellyfish, there is no way to describe the habits of this taxon.

== See also ==
- List of Ediacaran genera
- Georg Gürich
