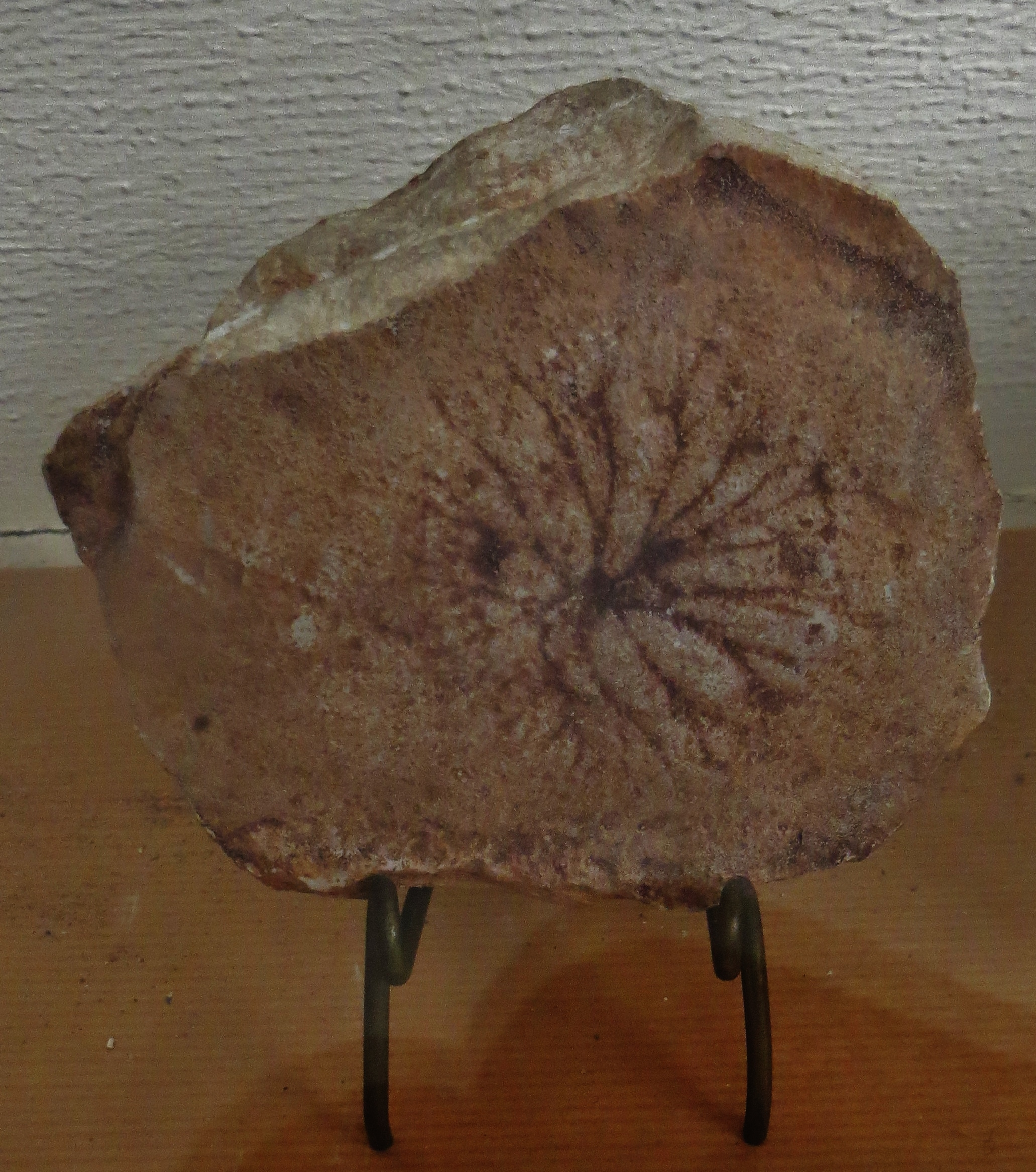
- Pseudorhizostomites howchini fossil
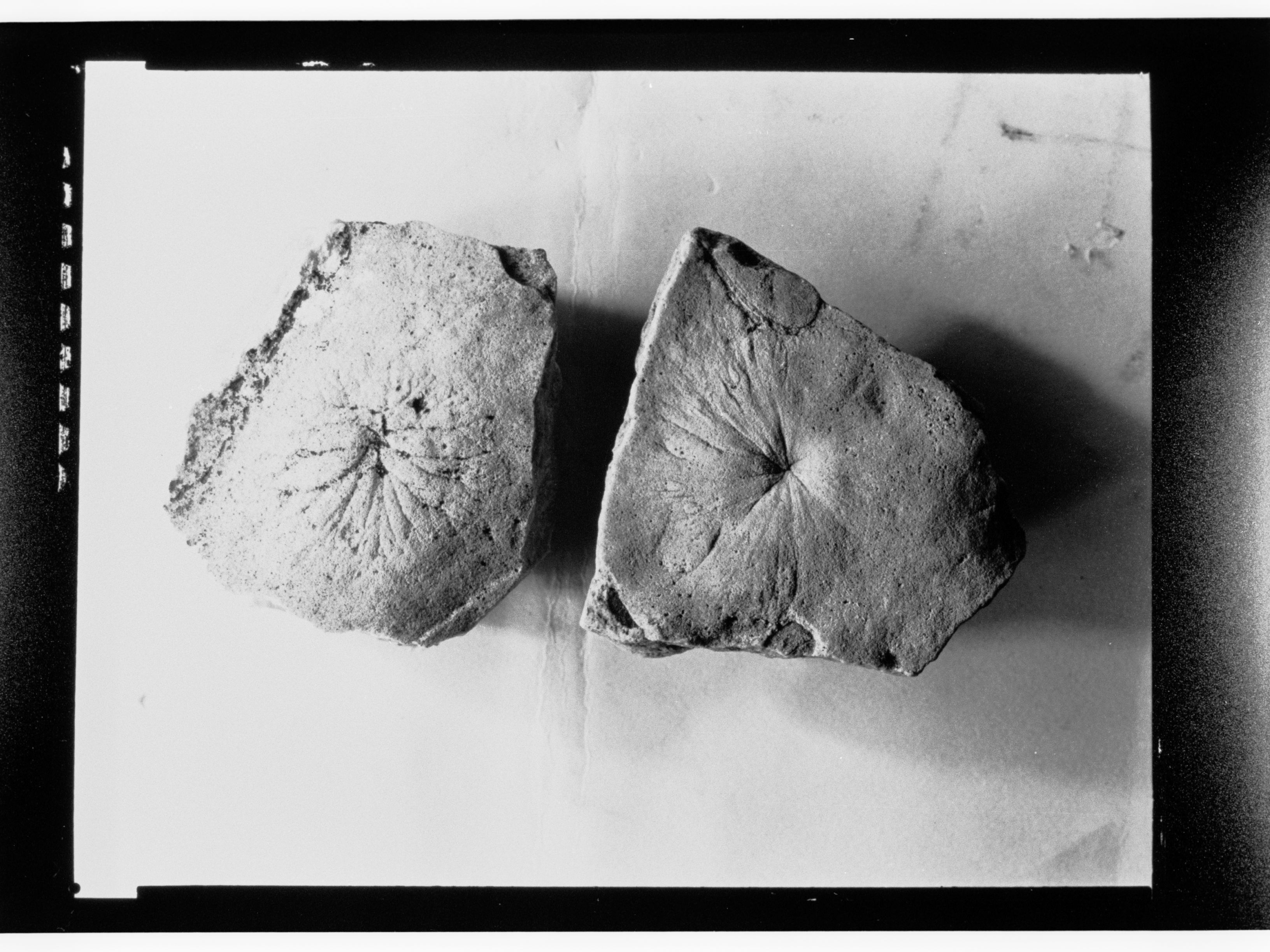
- GN14254 and GN14295 in The History Trust of South Australia collection.

Scientific classification
- Kingdom: Animalia
- Genus: †Pseudorhizostomites; Sprigg, 1949
- Species: †P. howchini

Binomial name
- †Pseudorhizostomites howchini Sprigg, 1949

Synonyms
- †Pseudorhopilema Sprigg, 1949; †Wigwamiella Runnegar, 1991

= Pseudorhizostomites =

Pseudorhizostomites Temporal range: Ediacaran

Alleged fossil of unknown origin

Pseudorhizostomites howchini is an enigmatic member of the Ediacaran Biota which was in the past thought to have been a jellyfish of some kind (Sepkoski, 2002). P. howchini is now thought to either have been a pseudofossil, a gas escape structure or perhaps the result of a rangeomorph holdfast being pulled by currents or, if any of these possibilities are not true, some other force from the sediments which enclosed the fossil.

== Distribution and discovery ==
Reginald Sprigg found the Holotype of P. howchini within the Flinders Ranges of South Australia. Fossils of Pseudorhizostomites also occur within the White Sea region of Russia on Zimnii Bereg, the Dniester River Basin of Podolia, Ukraine and Gornaya Baskkiria of the Ryauzyak Basin. These fossils are commonly found at all locations.

== Classification and interpretations ==
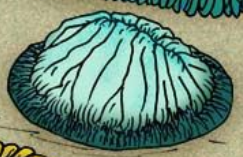
Artists interpretation of Wigwamiella enigmatica, thought to be a synonym to Peudorhizostomites.

Sepkoski (2002) suggested the possibility of the problematic fossils as being a Jellyfish. Although a more modern and updated interpretation of P. howchini is it being a pseudo-fossil or a structure caused by the Holdfast of a Petalonamid being pulled out by the currents. Pseudorhizostomites tends to occur around very thin impressions and casts of fossils which are the likely producer of Pseudorhizostomites if they decayed. The decayed parts of the organisms preserved alongside the biogenic structure were also interpreted as escaping through an overlying sand lamina. The species Rugoconites tenuirugosus was thought to be the originator behind P. howchini; the fossil was also compared with the living Hydrozoan Campanularia.

== Description ==
Pseudorhizostomites howchini is a form which represents a large amount of grooves radiating from a centre, which along the way irregularly branch out from one-another towards the outside. No distinct peripheral boundary is present in fossils. The central part which has the grooves radiating from is often strongly depressed (Negative hyporelief). The diameter of the grooves can often vary significantly, and can be from 9–60 mm in some specimens.

== See also ==
- Aspidella
- List of Ediacaran genera
