= Margaritiflabellum =

Margaritiflabellum Temporal range: late Ediacaran ~553 Ma

Scientific classification
- Domain: incertae sedis
- Genus: †Margaritiflabellum; Ivantsov, 2014
- Species: †M. anatolii

Binomial name
- †Margaritiflabellum anatolii Ivantsov, 2014

Genus of Ediacaran fossil

Margaritiflabellum is an extinct enigmatic organism from late Ediacaran of Russia. It resembles an unfolded fan, and is also a monotypic genus, containing only Margaritiflabellum anatolii.

== Discovery ==
The first fossils of Margaritiflabellum were collected from the Kimberella Lens site of the Zimnegorsk locality in the Mezen Formation, White Sea, Arkhangelsk Region, Russia in 1994. It was formally described and named in 2014.

== Etymology ==
The generic name Margaritiflabellum derives from both the fictional character name "Margarita" and the Greek word "margarita", to mean pearl; and the Latin word flabellum, to mean fan, in reference to the shape and impressions of the organism. The specific name anatolii is in honour of Anatoly Fedorovich Stankovsky, a well known Russian geologist who had studied the White Sea area extensively, and in honour of him wishing to name an organism from the area after his favourite character from the book of "The Master and Margarita", although he passed the shortly before the organism was named in 2014. As such, Ivanstov fulfilled this wish.

== Description ==
Margaritiflabellum anatolii is a unfolded fan-shaped organism, ranging from 6–57 mm (0.2–2.2 in) in length and 7.3–63 mm (0.3–2.5 in) in width, and is of shallow negative relief preservation, meaning it is an impression on the rocks surface. The body itself contains numerous pits and impressions, with smaller ones being evenly distributed across the body, whilst larger ones are sporadically distributed. These pits are not visible in the smallest specimens. Surrounding the outer margin of the body is a distinct ribbon-like structure, which is sometimes smooth or folded in appearance, and are devoid of the pits seen in the main body.

== See also ==
- List of Ediacaran genera
- List of White Sea biota species by phylum
