= Kuibisia =

Kuibisia Temporal range: late Ediacaran ~550–548 Ma

Scientific classification
- Kingdom: Animalia
- Phylum: Cnidaria
- Class: Medusae
- Genus: †Kuibisia; Hahn & Pflug, 1985
- Species: †K. glabra

Binomial name
- †Kuibisia glabra Hahn & Pflug, 1985

Ediacaran organism

Kuibisia glabra is a sac-like and polyp-like solitary Ediacaran organism. The fossil of Kuibisia was dated to be around 550 - 548 million years old and was found in a pteridinium deposit at Aar Farm in Namibia, South Africa.

== Discovery and naming ==
The holotype fossil of Kuibisia was found from the Aar Farm, Kuibis Quartzite, Nama Group in Namibia, and described in 1985.

The generic name Kuibisia comes from the place name "Kuibis Subgroup", where the fossils were found. The specific name glabra derives directly from the Latin word glabra, to mean “smooth”, after the appearance of the organism's surface.

== Description ==
Kuibisia glabra is built like a conical shaped polyp, about 100 mm (3.9 in) in height and 35 mm (1.4 in) at its widest point. It has a sack-like central region, and slender basal core. The organism lived as a single and solitary polyp. The apical “mouth” is densely covered by a wreath of tentacles and developed from coaxial ribs that cover the surface of the organism. The fossil is dated to be around 550 - 548 million years old.

== Other notable characteristics ==
Kuibisia is ecologically similar to other polyp shaped organisms, the Ceriantharia and the Actiniaria. Kuibisia resembles the sessile Ceriantharia in some features, but this does not mean that there is a relationship between them. Hahn and Pflug placed the genera Ausia and Kuibisia within the family Ausiidae and interpreted them as an early branch of Coelenterata.

A recent paper that describes Arimasia, also re-evaluated all genera from the same area that Arimasia comes from, noting that a similar looking genus Namalia may be a senior synonym of Kuibisia, with both possibly being conspecific with the Ernietta genus all together, noting that the differences in morphology may be down to the preservation of the fossil material.

== See also ==
- List of Ediacaran genera
- Cnidaria
