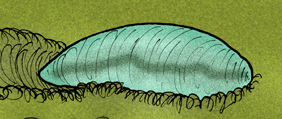
- Artist's restoration

Scientific classification
- Kingdom: Animalia
- Clade: Bilateria
- Genus: †Ikaria; Evans et al., 2020

Type species
- †Ikaria wariootia Evans et al., 2020

= Ikaria (genus) =

Ikaria Temporal range: Ediacaran, 560–555 Ma

Early bilaterian organism fossil species

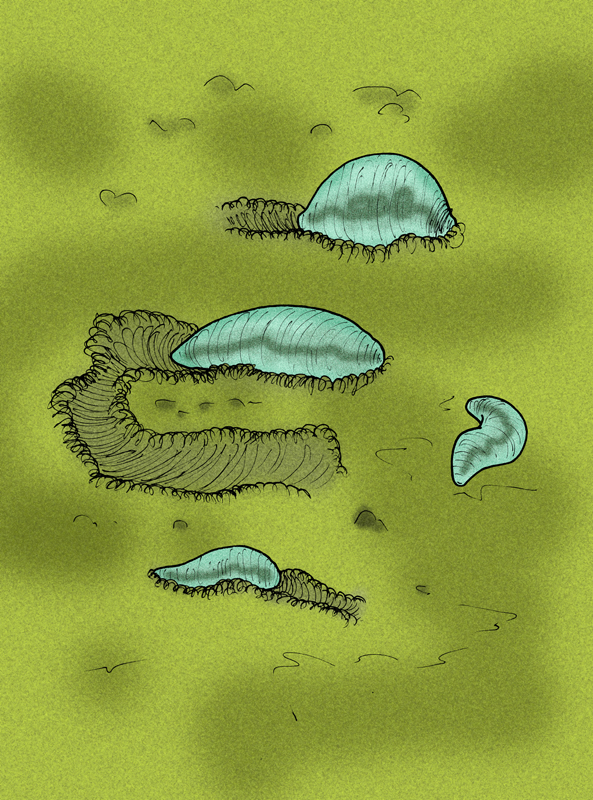
Group of Ikaria wariootia

Ikaria is an extinct monospecific genus of a worm-like, possible bilaterian animal. Its fossils are found in rocks of the Ediacara Member of South Australia that are estimated to be between 560 and 555 million years old. The genus is represented by a single species, Ikaria wariootia. A representative of the Ediacaran biota, Ikaria lived during the Ediacaran period, roughly 15 million years before the Cambrian, when the Cambrian explosion occurred and where widespread fossil evidence of modern bilaterian taxa appear in the fossil record.

== Discovery ==
Scott D. Evans, Ian V. Hughes, James G. Gehling, and Mary L. Droser published a paper in the Proceedings of the National Academy of Sciences of the United States of America on 23 March 2020, describing the finding and identification of I. wariootia.

== Age ==
The age of Ediacara Member strata are not well-defined through radiometric dating, and are primarily estimated comparatively with other Ediacaran Biota assemblages, likely ranging between 562 and 542 million years ago. Brazilian trace fossils associated with later bilaterians, found 30–40 m (98–131 ft) above a bed radiometrically dated to around 555 million years ago, are thought to be younger than Ikaria.

== Etymology ==
The generic name is taken from the Adnyamathanha word for 'meeting place' ("Ikara", also the name of the nearby Wilpena Pound) in recognition of the local indigenous people who originally lived in the region where the fossils were collected. The specific name refers to Warioota Creek, the type locality.

== Features ==
Over 100 Ikaria fossils have been found. These are simple imprints resembling a small grain of rice—from 1.9 to 6.7 mm (0.075 to 0.264 in) in length—slightly thickening to one end. The "anterior"/"posterior" differentiation may indicate that Ikaria was a bilaterally symmetrical animal. No other details of Ikaria anatomy were found on its fossils.

On the same sandstone bed there are numerous trace fossils of the type Helminthoidichnites. The animal that produced such traces moved or burrowed through thin layers of well-oxygenated sand on the ocean floor as it sought sustenance and appeared to show sensory and seeking behaviour, turning as it moved. It is thought to have moved by peristalsis, constricting muscles against the animal's hydrostatic skeleton, and may have possessed a coelom, mouth, anus, and through-gut, in a similar way to a worm.

The authors of the Ikaria description find that the size and morphology of Ikaria match predictions for the producer of the trace fossil Helminthoidichnites. At least one of the fossils of Ikaria identified in the study was found in close proximity to Helminthoidichnites, which the discoverers attribute to vertical motion of the organism through sediment before its death - noting that due to differing preservation methods it is unlikely that both trace and body fossil could otherwise form simultaneously. However, this does not entirely remove the possibility that the association of Ikaria with Helminthoidichnites is erroneous.

== Significance ==
This discovery is notable because while it has been long suspected that bilaterians evolved in the Ediacaran, for example Temnoxa and Kimberella, the vast majority of Ediacaran biota fossils are very different from the animals that came to dominate the life on Earth in the Cambrian until the present day.

Other researchers remained skeptical of whether Ikaria truly represents a bilaterian based on the available morphological evidence, and whether its association with the ichnofossil Helminthoidichnites is accurate.

== See also ==
- Yilingia spiciformis
- Proarticulata
- Vernanimalcula
