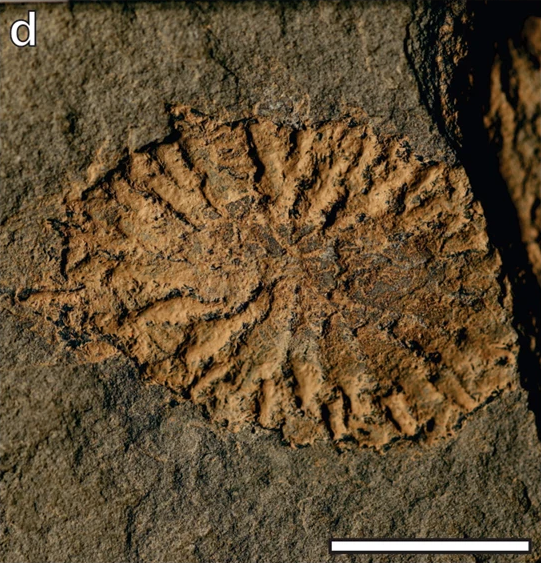
- P. chahgazensis fossil
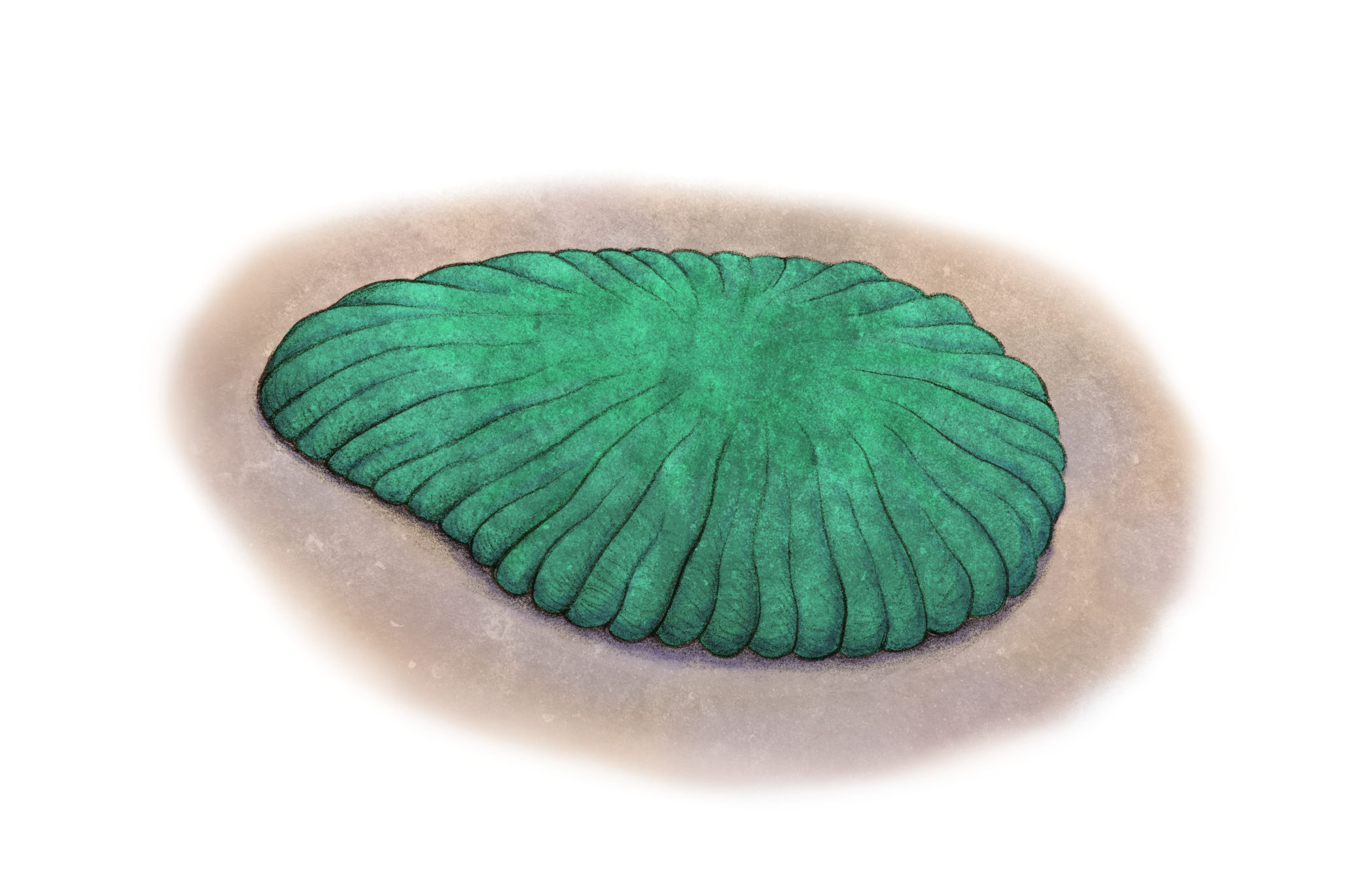
- Artist's restoration

Scientific classification
- Kingdom: Animalia
- Phylum: Cnidaria
- Class: Cyclozoa
- Genus: †Persimedusites Hahn et Pflug, 1980
- Species: †P. chahgazensis

Binomial name
- †Persimedusites chahgazensis Hahn et Pflug, 1980

= Persimedusites chahgazensis =

Precambrian discoidal species

Persimedusites chahgazensis is a Precambrian discoidal species which are believed to have existed primarily during the late Ediacaran period. It was discovered initially in the Kushk Series in the Bafq and Behabad regions of central Iran, along with similarly aged specimens of Cloudina and Corumbella. The body fossils of these disc-shaped organisms are approximately one centimeter in diameter, and were noted to have symmetrical internal lobes, as well as secondary distal branches.

== Description ==
These preserved branching structures have a noted resemblance to tentacles, and have been observed to be similar to the oral view of Eolympia pediculata. Similar fossils from the late Neoproterozoic Cerro Negro Formation in Argentina have been suggested to resemble Aspidella, but the Iranian specimens lack the customary holdfasts. An important feature of Perimedusites lacked by many similarly disc-shaped late Ediacaran fossils is the radial branches that extend from their center, creating a repetitive structure. Rugoconites enigmaticus, however, does manifest a similar structure, making it possibly comparable.

As a member of the phylum Cnidaria, Persimedusites has been hypothesized to resemble a modern jellyfish due to their four-fold radial symmetry. But the true form of these fossils cannot yet be interpreted unequivocally.

== See also ==
- List of Ediacaran genera
- Medusinites
