= Keretsa =

Keretsa brutoni Temporal range: Ediacaran ~555 Ma

Scientific classification
- Kingdom: Animalia
- (unranked): Bilateria
- Phylum: incertae sedis (?Arthropoda) (?Proarticulata)
- Genus: Keretsa Ivantsov, 2017
- Species: K. brutoni

Binomial name
- Keretsa brutoni Ivantsov, 2017

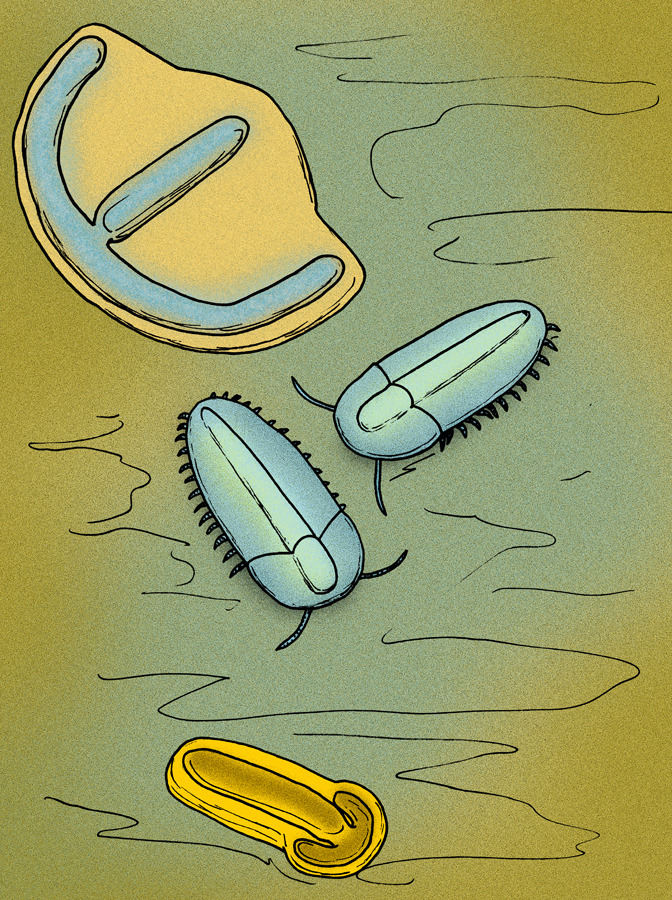
Artist's reconstruction of K. brutoni as an arthropod, compared to individuals of Parvancorina

Keretsa brutoni is a fossil bilaterian from the Late Precambrian-aged Zimnie Gory Formation near Arkhangelsk Oblast, Russia, along the Winter coast of the White Sea. The first specimens were found in 2005. This rounded oblong-shaped organism resembles Naraoia, in having its body divided into an anteriorly positioned headshield, and a trunkshield. A pair of antennae-like structures emanate from underneath the base of the headshield, and there are numerous oblique grooves along the trunkshield that suggest legs.
