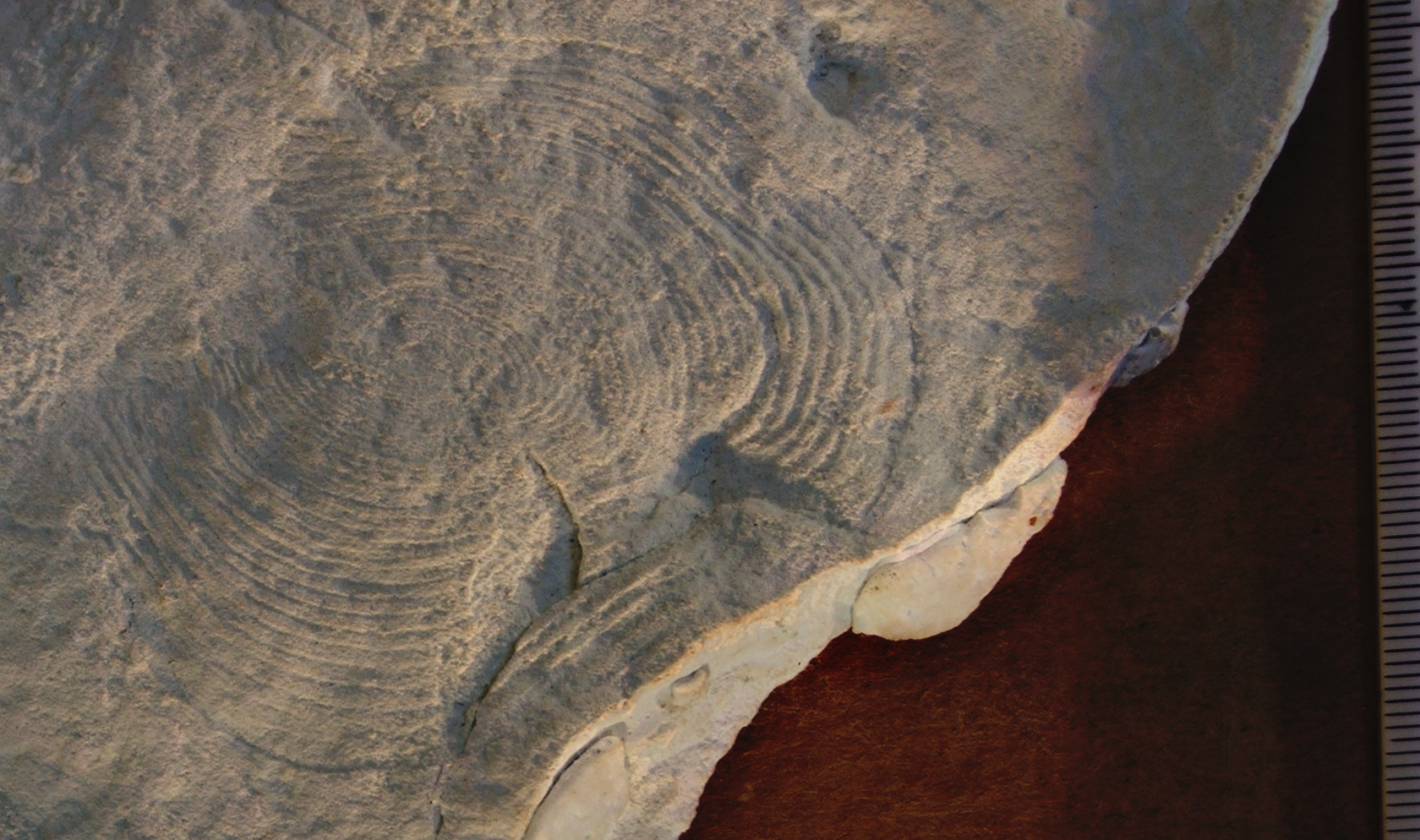
- Cast of Ovatoscutum concentricum

Scientific classification
- Kingdom: Animalia
- Phylum: †Proarticulata
- Genus: †Ovatoscutum; Glaessner & Wade, 1966
- Species: †O. concentricum

Binomial name
- †Ovatoscutum concentricum Glaessner & Wade, 1966

= Ovatoscutum =

Ovatoscutum concentricum Temporal range: 555 Ma

Extinct species of enigmatic organism

Ovatoscutum concentricum is one of many enigmatic organisms known from the Ediacaran deposits of the Flinders Ranges, Australia, and the White Sea area in Russia, dating around 555 Ma.

== Etymology ==
The generic name Ovatoscutum is derived from the Latin ovatus (oval) and scutum (shield).

== Description ==
This fossil has the form of a rounded shield, enclosing strongly concentric corrugations or ribs, which weaken adjacent to a triangular neckline. A suture-like zone extends through the center from the apex of the neckline towards the opposite margin. The ribs become wider towards the periphery.

The symmetry of these ribs exhibits glide reflection (opposite isometry); that is, the corresponding segments on the left and right sides do not line up, but are offset.

== Affinity ==
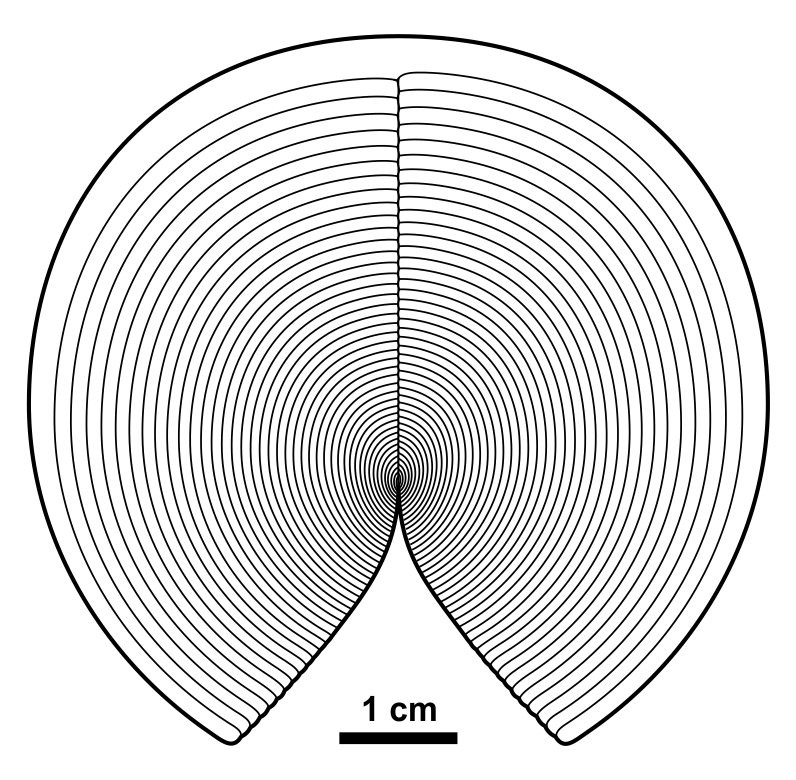
Schematic reconstruction of Ovatoscutum concentricum

Ovatoscutum was first described by Martin Glaessner and Mary Wade in 1966, and this team tentatively interpreted it as a chondrophoran pneumatophore. This notion was based on morphologies apparently shared between Ovatoscutum and the Devonian Plectodiscus, leading to an interpretation of the organism as a velellid (pneumatophore), which itself bears a passing resemblance to the modern chondrophoran pneumatophore Velella. Thus the hypothesis emerged that the Ovatoscutum was a pelagic hydrozoan chondrophoran. This hypothesis later became popular and was widely quoted, despite the absence of further research.

As far back as 1966 Glaessner and Wade remarked that no evidence of a velellid 'sail' existed in Ovatoscutum and that Ovatoscutum differed from all other known porpitid chondrophorans.

Ovatoscutum fossils are negative imprints on the bases of sandstone beds with the "elephant skin" and tubercle texture, diagnostic of microbial mats. The same bedding planes contain various other benthic organisms: Yorgia, Andiva, Dickinsonia, Tribrachidium, Kimberella, Parvancorina and others.

The Ediacaran assemblages included in the bedding planes that were responsible for preserving the fossil forms of these benthic organisms are remarkably intact, indicating that they were mostly undisturbed during their burial and preservation in situ. This mode of preservation thus argues against both a pelagic lifestyle and a chondrophoran interpretation of Ovatoscutum.

Mikhail A. Fedonkin places Ovatoscutum in the extinct phylum Proarticulata.

In the light of current morphological and taphonomic data, the precise nature of Ovatoscutum is still under consideration. Its affinities therefore remain unknown.

== See also ==
- List of Ediacaran genera
