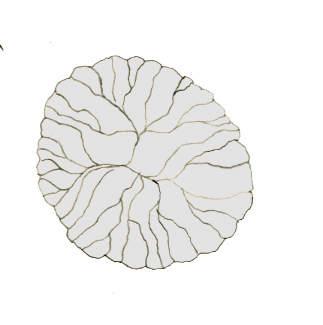
- Reconstruction of Rugoconites, an extinct organism

Scientific classification
- Kingdom: Animalia
- Phylum: †Trilobozoa
- Genus: †Rugoconites; Glaessner & Wade 1966

Species
- R. enigmaticus (type) Glaessner & Wade 1966; R. reguibatensis Hachour et al., 2023; R. tenuirugosus Wade, 1972

Synonyms
- Lorenzinites Glaessner & Wade, 1966; Wadea Jenkins, 1992

= Rugoconites =

Rugoconites Temporal range: Cryogenian - Ediacaran 670–550 Ma

Extinct genus of invertebrates

Rugoconites is a genus of Ediacaran biota found as fossils in the form of a circular or oval-like impression preserved in high relief, six or more centimeters in diameter. The fossils are surrounded by frills that have been interpreted (Wade 1972) as sets of tentacles. The bifurcating radial ribs, spreading from a central dome, serve to distinguish this genus from the sponge Palaeophragmodictya, and may represent the channels of the gastrovascular system. Fossils of Rugoconites have been interpreted as early sponges, although the organism has also been interpreted as a free-swimming jellyfish-like cnidarian, similar to Ovatoscutum. However, the fossil is consistently preserved as a neat circular form and its general morphology does not vary, therefore a benthic and perhaps slow-moving or sessile lifestyle is more likely. Ivantstov & Fedonkin (2002), suggest that Rugoconites may possess tri-radial symmetry and be a member of the Trilobozoa.

Rugoconites have been reported in clusters; this may represent a social/colonial way of life, or simply accumulation by the action of currents, sea-floor processes, or possibly preservational conditions.

The Rugoconites genus may contain two species: Rugoconites enigmaticus and Rugoconites tenuirugosus, the latter being less dome-shaped and having smaller and more numerous radial ridges than the former. However, due to the dubious nature of R. tenuirugosus, its taxonomy is still unclear, and it has been suggested that a new genus named Wadea should be erected for ''R." tenuirugosus.

Fossil of Rugoconites, with its outer margin outlined

In 1966, Martin Glaessner along with Mary Wade unearthed the external mold of a form which possessed a small central disc that had eleven radiating lobes from its center that they named Lorenzinites rarus. This form was also compared to the top of some Rugoconites specimens. The fossil of Lorenzinites rarus was, however, reconsidered to be a Rugoconites enigmaticus specimen despite his original observations and placed it along with the genus in the synonymy of Rugoconites. The genus was then forgotten about and needs further examination.

== See also ==
- List of Ediacaran genera
- Trilobozoa
