= Studenicia =

Studenicia Temporal range: Ediacaran

Scientific classification
- Domain: incertae sedis
- Genus: †Studenicia; Gureev, 1983
- Species: †S. galeiforma

Binomial name
- †Studenicia galeiforma Gureev, 1983

Extinct genus of invertebrates

Studenicia is a genus of Ediacaran fauna which is approximately 635-545 million years old. All Ediacaran fauna are considered to be invertebrate Metazoans or multicellular organisms with no backbone.

== Description ==
The fossils are made of small casts of the body. Studenicia is a small round organism (plan view) approximately 1-2 centimeters in diameter, and flat (side view). It is distinguished from other Ediacaran genera such as Nemiana by the presence of the central tubercle and Studenicia has a simpler structure (lacking rings) than Tirasiana.

== Diversity ==
Gureev only documented one species of Studenicia which is known as Studenicia galeiforma.

== Discovery ==
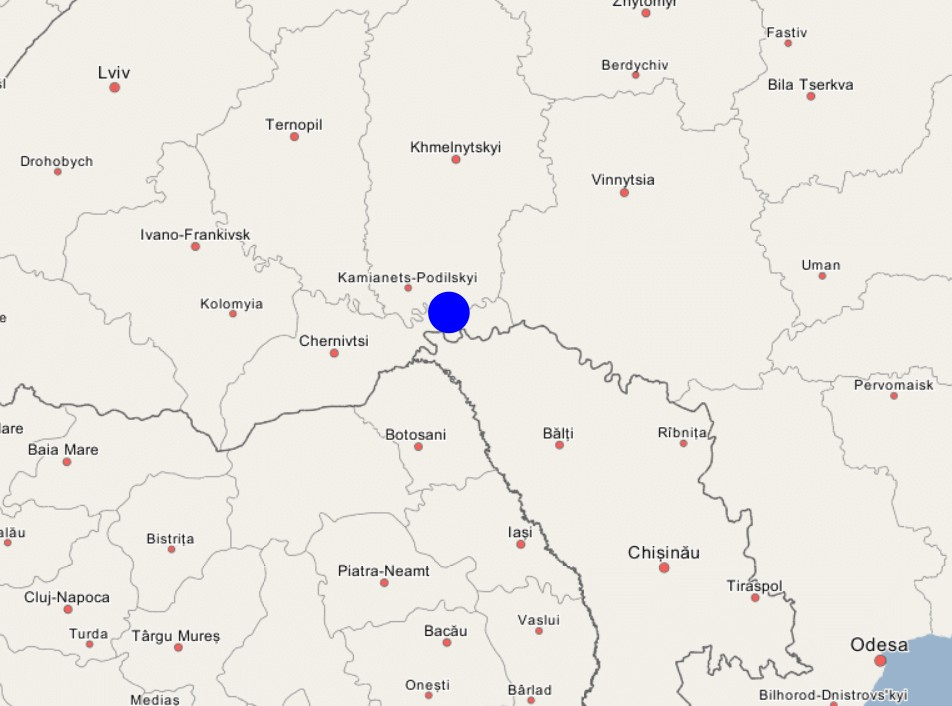
Location of the discovery in Ukraine of the genus Studenicia

Studenicia was discovered in the Studenitsa formation of the Dniester river, near Studenitsa village, Podolia, Ukraine. The fossil was discovered by Y. Gureev and first cataloged in 1983.

== Distribution ==
Studenicia has only been found in the Studenitsa formation of the Dniester river, near Studenitsa village, Podolia, Ukraine.

== Ecology ==
Studenecia was a sedentary organism that lived on lower plane stratification. The Studenitsa Formation outcrops are composed of grey sandstones, siltstones, and mudstones, with units of multi-grained sandstones. The outcrops have a total thickness of up to 60m in certain areas.

== See also ==
- List of Ediacaran genera
