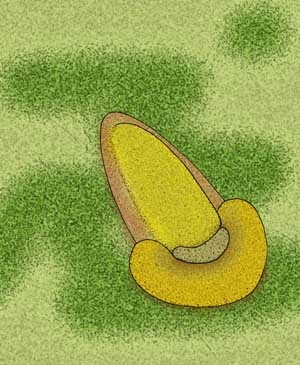
- Schematic reconstructions of Temnoxa molluscula

Scientific classification
- Kingdom: Animalia
- Phylum: incertae sedis: Arthropoda? Mollusca?
- Genus: †Temnoxa Ivantsov in Ivantsov et al. 2004
- Species: †T. molluscula

Binomial name
- †Temnoxa molluscula Ivanstov in Ivantsov et al. 2004

= Temnoxa =

Temnoxa Temporal range: Ediacaran, around 558–555 Ma

Extinct species of Ediacarian animal

Temnoxa molluscula is a small creature approximately 8 mm wide found in the Ediacaran period (558-555 Ma) in Russia. The Temnoxa has a resemblance to a vertically cut penny bun mushroom. Due to the lack of information regarding the fossils of this organism, researchers are unable to place Temnoxa molluscula into any known phylum. The genus was originally discovered by Russian paleontologist Andrey Yu. Ivantsov in 2004.

Due to its body lacking metameric (linear series of body segments) appendages, it's highly hypothesized that this creature was closest related to molluscs. However, there are opposing theories regarding the accuracy of this categorization because its unsegmented body and U-shaped head is far too large to be considered a mollusc. It also lacks a single shield-like mantle, although a mantle-like structure appeared to slip away from a dorsal side of the body in the holotype.

Temnoxa molluscula also appeared to lack a respiratory and sensory processes. This creature may have had a crawling foot. Its bilateral symmetry suggests motility in Temnoxa. Another reason scientists hypothesize mobility for this organism is because in 2017, researchers from around the world observed the way that water flowed around its shell. It was discovered that they were able to face the direction of the water current using their U-shaped heads, and are most likely the oldest known species to have this capability. They may have been able to attach themselves to substrate using their sticky foot. This organism is compact yet flexible, able to enclose a visceral mass. Nevertheless, no direct fossil evidence exists for internal organs (Ivanstov et al. 2012).

Temnoxa shares certain features with other Ediacaran creatures, such as Kimberella and Parvancorina.

== See also ==
- List of Ediacaran genera
