= Bilinichnus =

Bilinichnus Temporal range: about 555 Ma

Scientific classification
- Ichnogenus: †Bilinichnus; Fedonkin & Palij, 1979
- Species: †B. simplex

Binomial name
- †Bilinichnus simplex Fedonkin & Palij, 1979

Enigmatic tubular trace fossil

Bilinichnus simplex is a trace fossil from the Ediacaran period which consists of two parallel ridges on sandstone bed sole which have been interpreted as trails of peristaltic locomotion of an unknown gastropod-like animal leaving these traces behind or as pseudofossil of some kind.

== See also ==
- List of Ediacaran genera
