= Vendomyces =

Vendomyces Temporal range: Ediacaran

Scientific classification
- Kingdom: ?Fungi
- Class: ?Chytridiomycetes
- Genus: †Vendomyces

Genus of fungi

Vendomyces is a genus of purported Ediacaran fungi, assigned to the Chytridiomycetes. However, it is unlikely that these fossils truly represent fungi.

== See also ==
- List of Ediacaran genera
