= Mawsonites =

Mawsonites Temporal range: late Ediacaran ~635.0–539.0 Ma
- Fossil of Mawsonites spriggi at Natural History Museum, London

Scientific classification
- Kingdom: Animalia
- Phylum: Incertae sedis, Cnidaria?
- Genus: †Mawsonites Glaessner & Wade, 1966

Type species
- Mawsonites spriggi Glaessner & Wade 1966

Fossil genus of uncertain placement

Mawsonites is a fossil genus dating to the Ediacaran Period, from 635–539 million years ago during the Precambrian era. The type species is Mawsonites spriggi. The names derive from South Australian geologists Douglas Mawson and Reg Sprigg.

== Taxonomy ==
The broader relationships of Mawsonites are as yet undefined. The animals lived during the Ediacaran, from 635–539 million years ago.

The type species is Mawsonites spriggi, named after South Australian geologist Douglas Mawson, and his student at the University of Adelaide, Reg Sprigg, later a notable geologist himself. It was named by Martin Glaessner and Mary Wade in 1966.

== Description ==
Glaessner and Wade describe it as: "Large, compressed, but in life presumably dome-shaped, becoming steeply conical near centre. Central conical part smooth-walled, truncated, and compressed in curved, overlapping folds in the holotype. The greater part of the surface is strongly sculptured with arcs of prominent, large, irregular, bosses which increase in size out-wards, and merge into the peripheral zone which is dominated by large, irregular, radially elongate lobes separated by deep clefts. They form radial furrows on the outer half of the disc. Periphery lobate. A circular area bearing the conical centre and the enclosing one or two arcs of bosses was more compressible than the remainder of the bell and was enclosed by a shallow annular groove on the surface of the dome."

Sprigg had labelled the fossil in 1958 as "Unnamed jellyfish". Mawsonites has been theorised to represent algae holdfasts, jellyfish, a filter feeder, a burrow, a microbial colony, or invertebrate tracks. Several of these possibilities would indicate that Mawsonites represents a trace fossil, not an organism. Its biological affinities were also called into question amid suggestions that it might represent a mud volcano or other sedimentary structure, but further research showed that these structures could not satisfactorily account for its complexity.

== Discovery and significance ==
The fossil was found in fossil beds discovered in 1946 by Reg Sprigg in the Ediacara Hills, around 30 km (19 mi) west of Beltana in the Flinders Ranges, South Australia. The site is now part of Nilpena Ediacara National Park, and part of a bid for World Heritage Site listing.

Sprigg's fossils are highly significant, as they represent the first discovery of an assemblage of multicellular biota from rocks of an epoch later called the Ediacaran, derived from the hills where discovered. The Edicaran biota show the earliest stages of animal evolution, which were quite distinct from the later Cambrian fossils.

== Examples ==
Mawsonites spriggii is held in the Sprigg Collection at the South Australian Museum in Adelaide, South Australia.

The National Museum of Natural History in Washington, D. C. holds a cast of the fossil.

== See also ==
- List of Ediacaran genera
