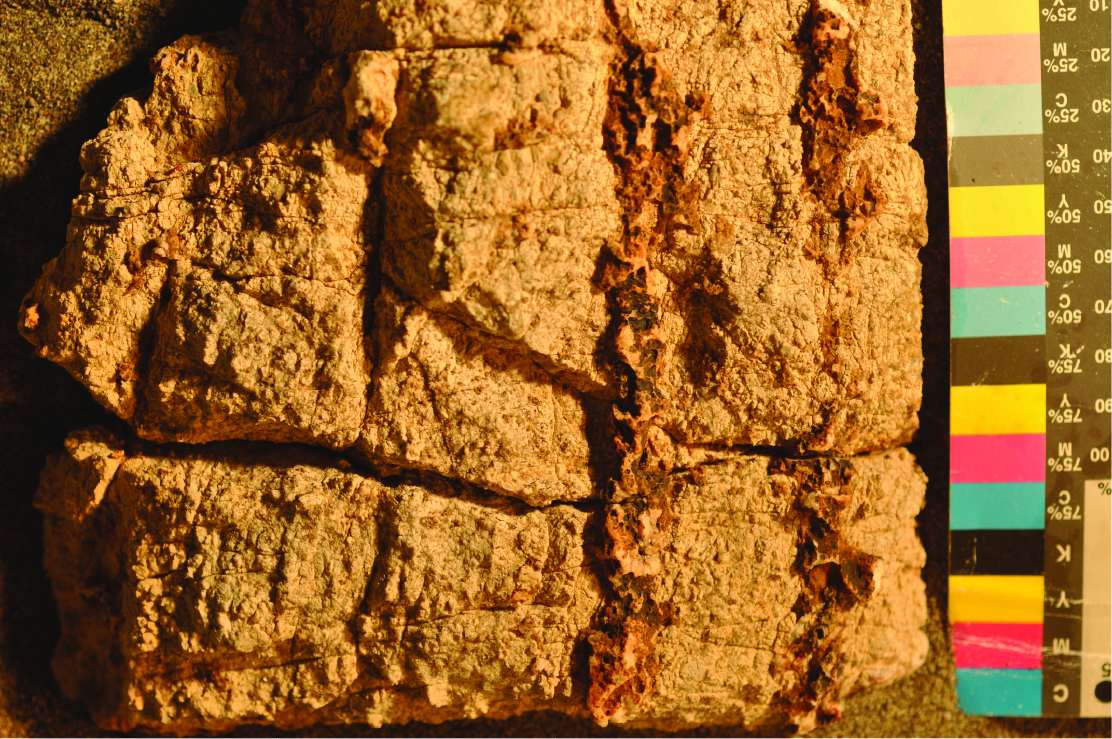

Scientific classification
- Kingdom: Fungi
- Subkingdom: Mucoromyceta
- Division: ?Mucoromycota
- Family: incertae sedis
- Genus: †Ganarake Retallack, 2022
- Species: †G. scalaris

Binomial name
- †Ganarake scalaris Retallack, 2022

= Ganarake =

Ganarake Temporal range: Ediacaran

Prehistoric fungus genus

Ganarake scalaris is an extinct species of lichen-like enigma, possibly within the division Mucoromycota first informally described as enigmatic cap-carbonate tubestones from basal Ediacaran sediments of the Southern Californian Noonday Formation. These tubestones were at first interpreted with a marine interpretation of the Noonday Formation as water escape structures, gas escape structures or as inverted stromatolites. However, associated paleosols and permineralized organic structures within the tubes with hyphae, spheroidal cells attached to the tubes and a remarkable organization of a thallus had remarkable similarities to habitats and microstructures of lichens. Ganarake has an isotopic composition and size comparable with a chlorophyte alga.

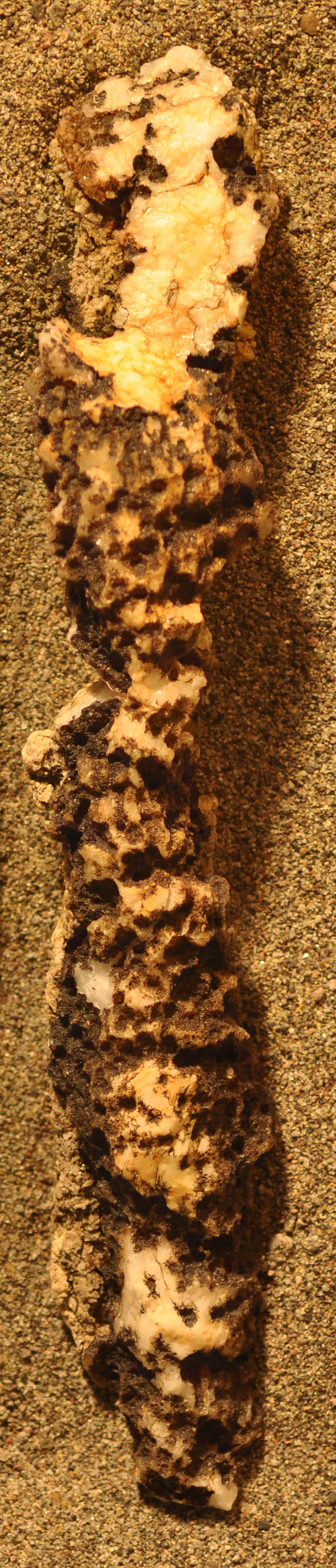
Holotype of silicified Ganarake scalaris, naturally weathered from dolostone

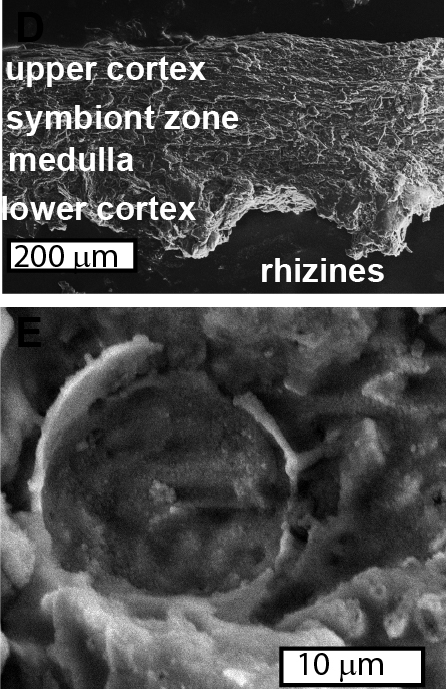
Scanning electron photomicrographs of cells including hyphae and photobionts of Ganarake

== Etymology ==
Part of the genus name Gan is named in honour of paleontologist Tian Gan at the University of Maryland-College Park, who discovered similar Ediacaran fungi. The second half of the name arake is Greek for bowl. Scalaris refers to its ladder-like appearance as it branches in both Y and H-like forms.

== Discovery ==
Even though the tubestones from the formation are now regarded as being of biological origin, they were originally interpreted as fluid escape structures or unique inverted stromatoliths. Historical evidence for a third option (lichenized fungi preserved in their growth positions) since the formation that G. scalaris was described from was compatible with the idea of lichens. Various microscopic observations confirmed fungal affinity with a stratified thallus of four layers. These layers are 1. Rectangular-cubic cells making up an upper cortex 2. A layer of spheroidal cells punctured and enveloped by slender hyphae 3. Medulla made out of the hyphae and 4. Lower cortex as thick as a few cells elaborated by intervals into multicellular rhizines extending down into the base of the sediment.

== Description ==
Series of shallow and irregular cups are stacked up on each other and are 20 millimeters (0.79 in) in diameter. The cups branch off from a wide, possibly originally hollow, central hollow. The hollow is interpreted as originally being hollow because it is filled with sparry dolomite. These cup-shaped flanges consist of radially arranged, branching both pinnately and dichotomously from septate hyphae and expand until they define the cups foliose thalli, they are in turn overgrown by oxalate and carbonate crystals. In thin sections, they are reminiscent to thin ropes. When viewing the thalli in macerates they are flattened and foliose.

== See also ==
- List of Ediacaran genera
