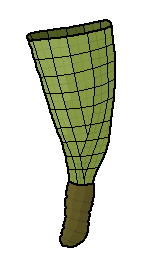
- Reconstruction of Helicolocellus cantori.

Scientific classification
- Kingdom: Animalia
- Phylum: Porifera
- Class: Hexactinellida (?)
- Genus: †Helicolocellus; Wang et al., 2024
- Species: †H. cantori

Binomial name
- †Helicolocellus cantori Wang et al., 2024

= Helicolocellus =

Helicolocellus Temporal range: Ediacaran, 543–539 Ma

Genus of prehistoric sponge

Helicolocellus cantori is an extinct sponge from the late Ediacaran of China, and possibly related to the Hexactinellida. It is a monotypic genus, containing only H. cantori, and if confirmed, would be the oldest crown group sponge known as of 2024.

== Discovery and naming ==
The holotype fossil of Helicolocellus was found in the limestone Shibantan Member of the Dengying Formation, in South China in 2019, and formally described in 2024.

The generic name Helicolocellus derives from the Greek word "helix", to mean "twisted"; and the Latin word "locellus", to mean "small box". The specific name cantori derives from the surname of Georg Cantor, a Mathematician who is most well known for the Cantor set, which describes regular patterning, reminiscent of what is seen in the fossil material.

== Description ==
Helicolocellus cantori is a conical sponge-like organism that grew up to around 40 cm (15.7 in) in height, and up to 10.8 cm (4.3 in) at the widest. The main body of Helicolocellus is subcylindrical in shape known to get up to 28.4 cm (11.2 in) in length, and is composed of regularly arranged rectangles, spaced 1.1 mm (0.0 in) apart from each other, which are all subdivided into three further rectangles. These rectangles are arranged in a straight, upright pattern at the top of the organism, and slowly become helically twisted nearer to the base of the body.

The size of the first-order of rectangles get up to 12 mm (0.5 in) in length and 8.9 mm (0.4 in) wide, splitting into four second-order rectangles, which get up to 5.3 mm (0.2 in) in length and 3.8 mm (0.1 in) wide, and then splitting again into third-order rectangles, of which get up to 2.55 mm (0.1 in) in length and 1.8 mm (0.1 in). Known fourth-order rectangles are too poorly preserved to allow for proper measurement.

The body is commonly found on top of a stem, which is known to get up to 16.3 cm (6.4 in) long and 30–48 cm (11.8–18.9 in) in width, with some specimens also preserving a basal disc, which can get up to 57 mm (2.2 in) in diameter.

== Taphonomy ==
Known fossil specimens of Helicolocellus have been preserved in positive relief, where the fossil is protruding from the rock, as well as negative relief, where the fossil is an impression on the rock, with an occasional mixture of both modes of preservation, something that is commonly seen with other non-biomineralised organisms within the same formation, like Arborea and Wutubus.

Helicolocellus itself was most likely preserved through a carbonate-cement rich sediment quickly filling up the cavity of the organism, preserving the organism through the various cast and mould reliefs. Although it is noted that as such, the body walls and their features are not preserved, and the preservation style differs greatly from bio-mineralising organisms also found within the same formation, such as Cloudina and Sinotubulites.

Due to non-biomineral nature of Helicolocellus, this has put the commonly used method of finding spicules to determine whether an organism is a sponge or not into doubt, with the researchers of the 2024 paper noting that earlier sponges, including Helicolocellus, may have had softer bodies, which would mean they would not be able to preserve properly, including any possible spicules, which are also not found in any specimens of Helicolocellus.

== Palaeoecology ==
The lifestyle of Helicolocellus is primarily based on its overall morphology, which consists of a large conical body on top of a stem and holdfast disc. This suggests that in life, Helicolocellus may have stood erect from the seafloor, and was benthic in nature, with the stem and holdfast disc possibly being a result of living on top of firm mat-grounds.

== Affinities ==
The overall bodyplan of Helicolocellus is similar to other probable Ediacaran sponges, like Thectardis and Ausia, although has enough distinct differences that it represents a new genus. The patterning of the rectangular boxes on the body has been noted to be superficially similar to what is seen in modern hexacorallians, although differ greatly in the fact that the boxes of Helicolocellus are subdivided and irregular nearer the base, whilst that is not the case in hexacorallians.

With this, it has been noted that the finer morphology of Helicolocellus is similar to that seen in Palaeozoic hexactinellids, exhibiting similar subdividing of boxes like in Clathrospongia, as well as growing to similar sizes, being comparable to the likes of Hydnoceras. It has also been noted that some fossil specimens of Clathrospongia are near identical in the preservation style seen in Helicolocellus. But one thing that differs between Helicolocellus and more modern sponges is the lack of biomineralised spicules, the skeleton of a sponge, although it most likely bore non-biomineralised spicules, as evidence by the patterning seen on the body. Through this, it is compared to the Devonian sponge-like organism Pontagrossia, which has a similar patterning and may had an organic skeleton. Although other researchers suggest that Helicolocellus may not be related to the hexactinellids due to the collapsing of the probable skeleton after death, and noted a possible relation with the sponge-like organism Palaeophragmodictya, although a recent study has supported a tentative placement for Helicolocellus as a crown-group hexactinellied.

== See also ==
- List of Ediacaran genera
