= Medvezichnus =

Medvezichnus Temporal range: Ediacaran

Trace fossil classification
- Ichnogenus: †Medvezichnus; Fedonkin, 1985

Trace fossil

Medvezichnus is a peculiar ichnofossil described by Mikhail A Fedonkin in 1985 in the "Systematic Description of Vendian Metazoa". The fossil of Medvezichnus pudicum is described as "a unique specimen of doubtful nature". In 'Neoproterozoic Geobiology and Paleobiology', it is stated that this form requires further documentation.

== See also ==
- List of Ediacaran genera
