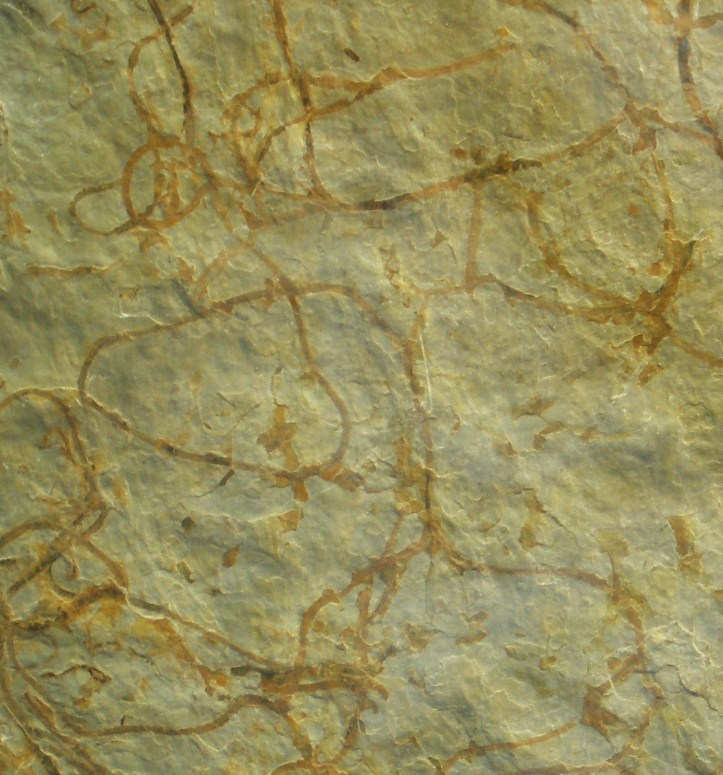
- Fossil of a Vendotaenid at Musee d'Histoire Naturelle, Brussels

Scientific classification
- Domain: incertae sedis, "Bacteria"?, "Algae"?

Genera
- †Aataenia Gnilovskaya, 1976; †Harlaniella Sokolov,1972; †Kroloataenia Tewari, 1988; †Laminarites Eichwald 1854; †Sinotaenia Chen & Zheng, 1986; †Tyrasotaenia Gnilovskaya, 1971; †Vendotaenia Gnilovskaya, 1971; †Vidhyania Tewari, 1988

= Vendotaenid =

Vendotaenid Temporal range: Tonian - early Cambrian ~650–530 Ma

Vendotaenids are Precambrian macrofossils of uncertain nature originally interpreted as brown algae. Little studies are available on vendotaenids as they are rare.

== Morphology ==
Vendotaenids typically are 1 millimeter (0.039 in) in width, 15 centimeters (5.906 in) in height and characteristically are commonly preserved as unbranched red or black ribbons. The remains are often curved and have been found twisted or untwisted. Vendotaenia tends to be untwisted whereas Tyrasotaenia tends to be twisted. Specimens of the vendotaenid Krolotaenia possess lateral branching, however it is not common to find a branch that branches into lateral ribbons. Tyrostaenia is unbranching and crumpled.

== Classification ==
The classification of these fossils has been problematic. Originally interpreted as brown algae, the fossils have also been argued to represent sulfide-reducing bacteria. They have more recently been suggested to represent red or green algae. There are potentially other taxa within Vendophyceae, listed in Tewari, 1999 as "synonyms". These synonyms are listed as: "Vendotaenia, Aataenia, Katnia, Laminarites, Proterotainia, Sinotaenia, Tyrasotaenia, Vidhyania, and Krolotaenia." There is little information on the fossils so it is difficult to reconstruct a full Phylogenetic tree of vendotaenids.

== Occurrence ==
Vendotaenids are able to be extracted from the surrounding sediments by HF dissolution and are found within Tonian to Cambrian aged rocks, covering a time span of 650 to 530 million years ago.

== See also ==
- List of Ediacaran genera
