= Lomosovis =

Scientific classification
- Domain: Incertae sedis
- Genus: Lomosovis; Fedonkin, 1983
- Species: L. malus

Binomial name
- Lomosovis malus Fedonkin, 1983

Enigmatic Ediacaran genus

Lomosovis is an extinct genus of Ediacaran organisms, containing the single species Lomosovis malus. It was first described by Fedonkin in 1983.

== Description ==
Lomosovis is a large, dendritic, colonial organism attached to a biomat substrate. The basal part consists of a relatively broad, high, obconical stem with a small discoid basal attachment. From the upper part of the stem, thin tubular processes emerge, often ending in a crown of fine, long setae. These processes may also branch from the lateral sides of the basal stem and frequently display dichotomous branching. The surface of the organism is generally flat. The upper part of the basal stem bears two semicircular processes, which may continue as long, tubular growths or shorter brush-like terminations. Below the upper stem, two or three processes of varying length emerge. Processes are thick near their base, becoming narrower distally, with slight thickening at branch points. The surface of both the basal stem and processes is usually smooth but may display fine longitudinal wrinkles. In some specimens, the basal stem has distinct transverse wrinkles, appearing as nearly straight double grooves. Evidence from curvatures, twisting, and contortions suggests the basal stem and processes were soft and flexible. The ends of processes and offshoots are commonly brush-like.
