= Bonata septata =

Scientific classification
- Kingdom: Animalia
- Phylum: Cnidaria
- Class: Medusae
- Genus: †Bonata; Fedokin, 1980
- Species: †B. septata

Binomial name
- †Bonata septata Fedokin, 1980

Multi-lobed Ediacaran fossil

Bonata is a monotypic, disk-shaped genus of Ediacaran organism that were originally found in the Ediacaran deposits of the White Sea area, Russia. It has been poorly studied because of the lack of fossil specimens found in the region since the 1980's. It contains a single species, Bonata septata.

== Description ==
B. septata fossils are made out of round-ovate impressions made out of two concentric zones. The outer zone of the disk is flat and broad, rarely appearing with concentric ridges. The inner zone of the organism has more relief in it which is most likely the product of a small amount of thickness within the body. The inner zone is marked by 11-19 radial and wedge-shaped lobes which end with roundness. These lobes do not reach the centre of the organism. Each lobe has a diameter of 5 mm. The diameter of the body from the known fossils has been noted to be around 40 mm, with the central zone being around 8–10 mm in diameter.

== Habitat ==
The animal was probably an epifaunal one which mostly lived on low-level locations on the sea floor.

== See also ==
- List of Ediacaran genera
