= Harlaniella =

Harlaniella Temporal range: late Ediacaran – early Cambrian ~575–532.83 Ma

Scientific classification
- Domain: incertae sedis
- Genus: †Harlaniella; Sokolov, 1972

Type species
- †Horodyskia podolica Sokolov, 1972

Species
- H. podolica Sokolov, 1972; H. confusa Signor, 1994; H. ingriana Ivantsov, 2013

Extinct genus of enigmatic fossils

Harlaniella is an enigmatic extinct organism from the late Ediacaran of Europe and the early Cambrian of California. It is elongated and composed entirely of small segments and occasionally branches. It was once considered to be a trace fossil, though recent studies have since discounted this and noted the fossils represent the internal casts of a body, although its true affinities still remain unknown, with it either being a Palaeopascichnid or a Vendotaenid.

== Discovery ==
The original fossil material for Harlaniella was found in the Dniester River area of Podolia, Ukraine in 1968 and described as coprolites, with further material being found in 1972 in the Studenitsa Formation of Ukraine, along with being formally described and named in the same year.

== Description ==
Harlaniella is a segmented rope-like organism, twisted in nature, and is known to get up to 100 mm (3.9 in) in length, and 3 mm (0.1 in) in width. A number of specimens also bear smaller branches along the larger branch, with the large branch bearing longitudinal furrows on the surface, whilst the smaller branches bear transverse furrows on the surface.

== Affinities ==
When the first fossil specimens of Harlaniella where found in 1968, they were originally interpreted as coprolites, although this wouldn't last long with Harlaniella being described in 1972, and being interpreted to be a trace fossil, an interpretation that persisted for a number of decades after. Lublin in Poland, Although, occasionally though-out this period of time, some researchers postulated that Herlaniella may have been a different mode of preservation for Palaeopascichnus, being commonly found on the same bedding planes and next to each other, but this interpretation was not further investigated. This would not last long, as later studies started to question the trace fossil interpretation, as it was noticed that an old fossil specimen that was described as Harlaniella did not line up with said interpretation, due to the changing widths of said material, and its similarities to Palaeopascichnus, with another study noting it may be phylogenetically related to Palaeopascichnus.

The trace fossil interpretation would be further discounted, with the discovery of new fossil specimens described in a paper in 2013, giving credence to Harlaniella actually being body fossils, although it would note that Harlaniella is more similar to the algal-like Vendotaenia than to Palaeopascichnus as previously suggested, due to the completeness of all known Harlaniella fossils, whilst Palaeopascichnus is known to break up into individual segments.

== Distribution ==
Harlaniella has been recovered from a number of localities, such as the type locality of the Studenitsa Formation in Ukraine, Member 1 of the Chapel Island Formation in Newfoundland, a number of areas within the Ust' Pinega Formation in Russia, and in the early Cambrian aged Wood Canyon Formation in California.

Tentative records have also been found from the Såvvovare Formation in Sweden, the Rawnsley Quartzite in South Australia, and the Lublin Formation of Poland.
