= Fedomia =

Fedomia Temporal range: late Ediacaran ~558–555 Ma
- Simplified line drawing of a radial Fedomia specimen. Note star-shaped structures. Scale bar: 1cm

Scientific classification
- Kingdom: Animalia
- Phylum: Porifera (?)
- Genus: †Fedomia; Serezhnikova & Ivantsov, 2007
- Species: †F. mikhaili

Binomial name
- †Fedomia mikhaili Serezhnikova & Ivantsov, 2007

Extinct genus of sponge-like organisms

Fedomia is an extinct organism from the late Ediacaran of Russia. It is a monotypic genus, containing only Fedomia mikhaili. It is most commonly considered to bear affinities to sponges, although some researchers suggest it to be a microbial colony instead.

== Discovery and naming ==
The holotype material for Fedomia was found along the Solza River in the Verkhovka Formation, White Sea, Russia, and was described and named in 2007.

The generic name Fedomia is in honour of Mikhail A. Fedonkin, deriving from his surname, who was at the time the Chief of Precambrian Laboratory, Paleontological Institute, Russian Academy of Sciences. The specific name mikhaili is also in honour of Mikhail A. Fedonkin.

== Description ==
Fedomia mikhaili is an organism composed of a dense cluster of sac-like bodies up to 50 mm (2.0 in) in length and 15 mm (0.6 in) in width, commonly found joined at the base, although it is noted singular specimens are also possible, though rarer. Within the clustered examples, the narrower ends of the individual bodies may point back towards the centre of the overall organism. Several fossil specimens also bear multiple, irregularly spaced star-shaped structures on them, with some better preserved examples displaying them in clean regular rows. The star-shaped structures themselves are composed of six to eight rays, which are curved in nature, with the angles between each varying, and can get up to 7.1 mm (0.3 in) by 5.3 mm (0.2 in) in size.

Fedomia may have also lived laying on the surface of the seafloor in life, due to their fossils only preserving one side, and possibly "glued" themselves to the substrate.

== Affinities ==
When described, Fedomia was noted to bear similarities to the Cambrian genus Eiffelia from the Burgess Shale, as well as the similarly aged Vaveliksia, and was thus interpreted to be a sponge-grade organism with organic spicules. Although, the researchers did make note that during the description, some called for caution in this placement, due to their being no preserved three-dimensional form known, no wall deformation in any fossil specimens, and the variable size of the star-shaped structures, which are possibly a result of cavities within Fedomia being in-filled during burial. A later study by some of the same researchers would note that a sponge affinity cannot be ignored, it is hard to place it into any Phanerozoic taxa, reiterating the previously mentioned points, although comparisons can still be made.

Although, come 2014, Antcliffe et al. would publish a study that re-analysed all named sponge-like organisms from the Ediacaran at the time, which included Fedomia. The researchers noted that the original description did not provide any arguments for the sponge affinity, and also the difficulty of discerning any sponge-like features in Fedomia. This would lead them to mention that Fedomia does not pass their criteria for being a sponge-like organism due to these reasons, but instead is more likely to be a microbial colony, or a macro-algal sheath. A few years later in 2017, a study published would make a quick mention of Fedomia being reported as spiculate, although not to a convincing amount, and making note of the previously mentioned criteria set out by Antcliffe et al. the previous year.

== See also ==
- List of Ediacaran genera
