= Namalia =

Namalia Temporal range: late Ediacaran ~548–541 Ma

Scientific classification
- Kingdom: Animalia
- Phylum: incertae sedis
- Genus: †Namalia; Germs, 1968
- Species: †N. villieriensis

Binomial name
- †Namalia villieriensis Germs, 1968

Germ species dating back to the Ediacaran geologic period

Namalia villieriensis was first described in 1968 by G. J. B. Germs from an outcrop near Helmeringhausen, Namibia and dates back to the Ediacaran Period, around 548 - 541 Ma. Namalia has a conical structure and it is thought that it lived semi-buried in sediment along the seafloor.

== Discovery and naming ==
The holotype fossil of Namalia was found at the Buchholzbrunn member, Dabis Formation, Kuibis Subgroup, Nama Group, Namibia in 1963 by G. J. B. Germs in an orthoquartzite layer, and officially described by them in 1968.

The generic name Namalia derives from the place name "Nama Group", which the fossils were found in.

== Description ==
Namalia is described as a multi-layered conical fossil, 52–90 mm (2.0–3.5 in) in length, that exhibits 27–40 longitudinally corrugated ridges on the outer surface with a blunt apex. In cross section, this genus has a 15–70 mm (0.6–2.8 in) oval opening with two layers and septa in between them. Many specimens are deformed indicating that the body was probably soft.

A recent paper that describes Arimasia, also re-evaluated all genera from the same area that Arimasia comes from, noting that Namalia may be a senior synonym of Kuibisia, with both possibly being conspecific with the Ernietta genus all together, noting that the differences in morphology may be down to the preservation of the fossil material.

== Diversity ==
Only one species, Namalia villieriensis, has been discovered so far. But there are multiple other known Nama-type biota, or benthic organisms with the hard parts preserved, that are thought to have lived in similar ecological niches as N. villieriensis.

== Ecology ==
Namalia lived in colonies as well as scattered individuals and are interpreted to have occupied shallow to deep waters. The specimens are found filled with sand which was previously thought to have entered the quilts (skeletal structure) after death. The taphonomic scenario is still debated as this scenario leads to a mechanical problem in hydrostatically supported structures. The prevailing hypothesis is that the sand was already in the quilt and that it could have loosely attached to trabecular structures that then disintegrated after death, or that the sand grains may have floated in the protoplasm.

== Distribution ==
Namalia has only ever been found at one other locality besides the orthoquartzite in the Kuibis Series in Namibia. The only other discovered site is located in the June beds in the Sewki Brook Formation in the Mackenzie Mountains in northwest Canada.

== See also ==
- List of Ediacaran genera
