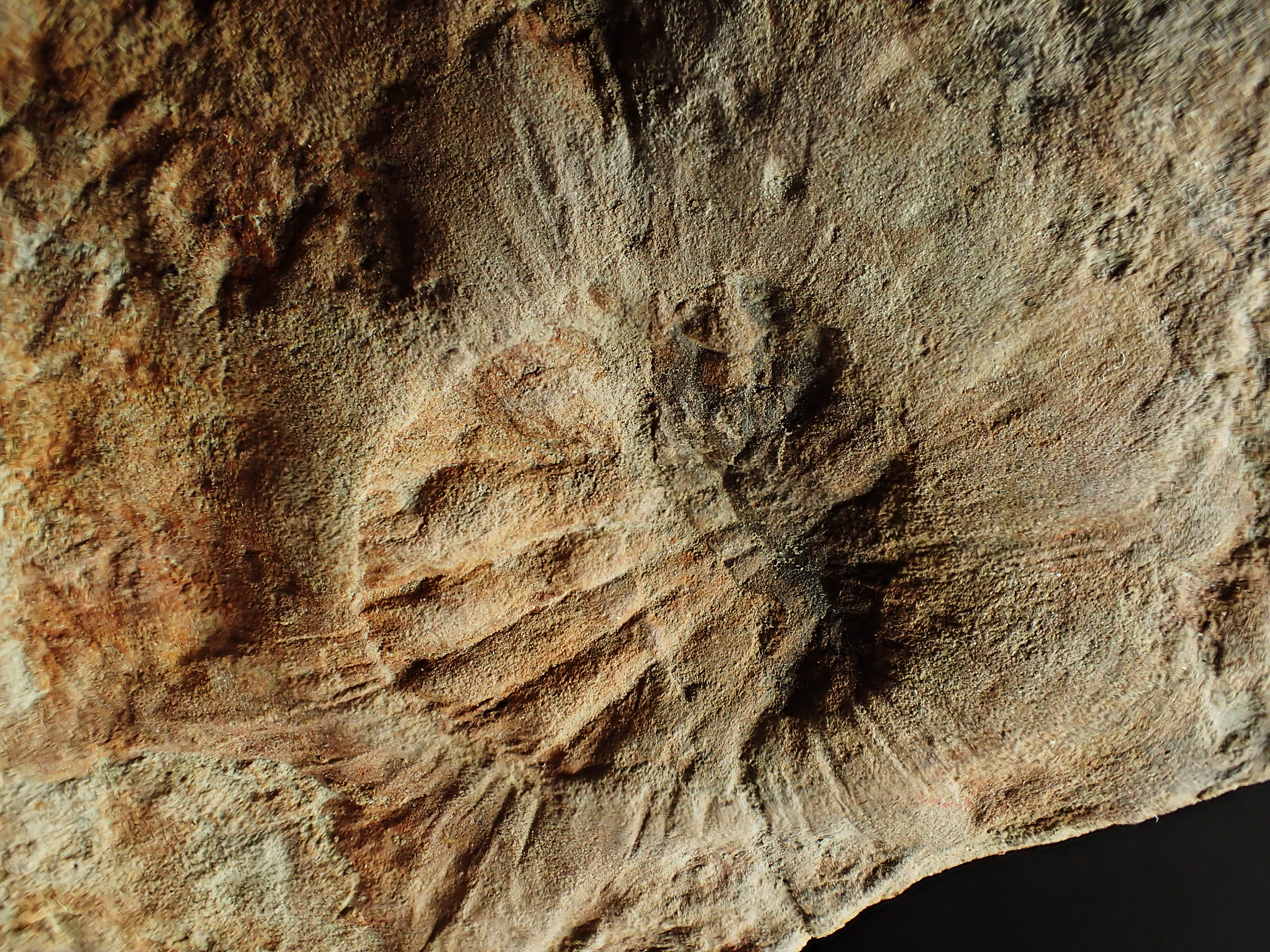
- Fossil of P. spinosa

Scientific classification
- Kingdom: Animalia
- Phylum: Porifera
- Class: Hexactinellida
- Order: †Reticulosa
- Genus: †Palaeophragmodictya; Gehling & Rigby, 1996

Species
- P. reticulata Gehling & Rigby, 1996; P. spinosa Serezhnikova, 2007

= Palaeophragmodictya =

Palaeophragmodictya Temporal range: Late Ediacaran, 558–555 Ma

Extinct genus of sponges

Palaeophragmodictya is an extinct genus of sponge-grade organisms from the Ediacaran Period. Originally interpreted as a hexactinellid sponge, the organism also bears some coelomate characteristics, including bilateral symmetry.

== Morphology ==
The organisms take the form of a rounded, dome-like bag, 7–68 mm in diameter, with an uneven margin. Radial grooves define sac-like compartments within the bag. The radial pattern has an element of bilateral symmetry. A stalk emerges from the central point of some specimens, at the top of the organism; in life, it probably extended into the water column. Ray-like filaments radiate outwards from the edge of the bag. Some structures in the organism have been interpreted as spicules.

== Ecology ==
The organisms have been interpreted as tall suspension feeders, reaching 10 cm or more up into the sea water above them.

== Original description ==
The genus was originally considered to be a member of the Dictyospongiidae family (Hexactinellia), and was among the first Precambrian sponges to be described.

== Distribution ==
First found in the Pound group of Australia, fossils have also been recovered from the White Sea region of Russia.

== Other sponge-like Ediacaran animals ==
- Fedomia
- Vaveliksia
- Helicolocellus
- Arimasia

== See also ==
- List of Ediacaran genera
