= Gaojiashania =

Gaojiashania Temporal range: Ediacaran 551–540 Ma

Scientific classification
- Kingdom: Animalia
- Phylum: incertae sedis
- Genus: †Gaojiashania; Yang, Zhang & Lin in Lin et al., 1986
- Species: †G. cyclus

Binomial name
- †Gaojiashania cyclus Yang, Zhang & Lin in Lin et al., 1986

Synonyms
- Genus: Annulusichnus Zhang, 1986; Species: Nimbia? gaojiashanensis Zhang, 1986; Annulusichnus regularis Zhang, 1986; Gaojiashania annulucosta Li et al., 1992; Gaojiashania caperata Li et al., 1992; Gaojiashania zonatus Li et al., 1992

Ediacaran worm-like organism

Gaojiashania cyclus is an extinct fossil worm-like, soft bodied organism known from the Ediacaran of China and North America. Composed of repeating ring-like units, G. cyclus is flexible, soft, and not easily preserved. Pyritization prior to decay of soft parts results in the well preserved casts and molds we see today. It probably had an epibenthic mode of life.

== Morphology, anatomy, and behavior ==
Initially thought to be an annelid, G. cyclus is a soft bodied organism with small, hard, internal rings. Specimen morphology does not have much variation, tube lengths range from 30 to 60 mm and have constant diameter. Specimens are composed of repeating flexible units, subdivided further into annuli (Figure 2).

== Method of fossilization ==
Gaojiashania cyclus are not preserved as a whole due to their soft bodies, and the only record that currently exists are impressions left behind by these organisms (Fig. 3). That being said, the impressions themselves are still fossilized and must undergo processes to become so. Three types of preservation have been identified within the Gaojiashan Lagerstätte section: pyritization, kerogenization (Fig. 5), and aluminosilicification (Fig. 6). Of these, pyritization is the dominant fossilization process, with over eighty percent of specimens found in certain areas having been fossilized this way. The level of preservation is due to this; pyritization likely occurred relatively early in the fossil forming process, before soft parts had decayed. This quick mineralization is what resulted in such detailed casts.

== Distribution and paleoenvironment ==
Located in Shaanxi Province of South China, G. cyclus is found abundantly within the aptly named Gaojiashan section of the Dengying Formation. It is here where much research on the organism has occurred, though more recently specimen casts have been found in Mount Dunfee, Nevada (Fig. 3)!

It is likely these organisms existed on the bottom of marine regions. Though there is little hard evidence to go off, researchers have determined G. cyclus was epibenthic, procumbent, and largely occurred in muddy substrates; certain rigid rings present may have acted as anchors to seafloor surfaces.
