= Elasenia =

Elasenia Temporal range: Ediacaran

Scientific classification
- Kingdom: Animalia
- Genus: † Elasenia Fedonkin, 1983

Type species
- † E. aseevae Fedonkin, 1983

Species
- †E. aseevae Fedonkin, 1983; †E. uralica Bekker, 1996

Genus of Ediacarian fossil animals

Elasenia is a genus of Ediacaran animals. The genus contains two species.

The genus was formerly included under Inordozoa, incertae sedis by Fedonkin. It was classified as a Coelenterate, but after the break up of the taxon into two different phylums - Cnidaria and Ctenophora - the current position of this animal is uncertain. It may be related to the extinct Trilobozoans (now considered a separate phylum) or the possible cnidarian class Cyclozoa.
