= Yilingia =

Yilingia Temporal range: Ediacaran 551–539 Ma

Scientific classification
- Kingdom: Animalia
- Clade: Bilateria
- Phylum: incertae sedis
- Genus: †Yilingia
- Species: †Y. spiciformis

Binomial name
- †Yilingia spiciformis Chen et al. 2019

Species of worm-like animal

Yilingia spiciformis is a worm-like animal that lived between approximately 551 million and 539 million years ago in the Ediacaran period, around 10 million years before the Cambrian explosion. A fossil of this creature and its tracks were discovered in 2019 in Southern China. It was a segmented bilaterian, conceivably related to panarthropods or annelids. It is a rare example of a complex Ediacaran animal that is similar to animals that existed since the Cambrian, hence suggesting that perhaps the Cambrian explosion was less sudden than often assumed.

== Discovery and naming ==
The holotype fossil, alongside 34 more fossils, of Yilingia were found in the Dengying Formation of South China, and described in 2019.

The generic name Yilingia is derived from the Latinised place name of Yiling, a district in the city of Yichang in China near to where the fossils were found. The specific name is derived from the Latin words spīca, meaning "spike", relating to the spiky lateral lobes of the animal; and 'formis', to mean 'form'.

== Description ==
Yilingia spiciformis has an elongated body, sometimes up to 270 mm (10.6 in) in length, which is made up of individual segments. These segments are metameric, with each metamere having three lobes, like later trilobites, with the outer two lateral lobes been spiky in appearance, and tucked beneath the central lobes. The body also starts off wide at the posterior end, and tapers inwards towards the anterior end of the body.

Some specimens have also been found at the end of trace fossils, suggesting that the animal was capable of movement, and also helped to understand which end was the posterior and which the anterior. These trace fossils make Yilingia one of the first and possibly the oldest known true animals to be capable of making decisions and moving on its own.

Although the recent discovery of Uncus, which is found in the older Flinders Ranges in South Australia, changes this, as it may be related to the Ecdysozoa, which could make Yilingia the second oldest known true animal capable of moving on its own.

== See also ==
- List of Ediacaran genera
