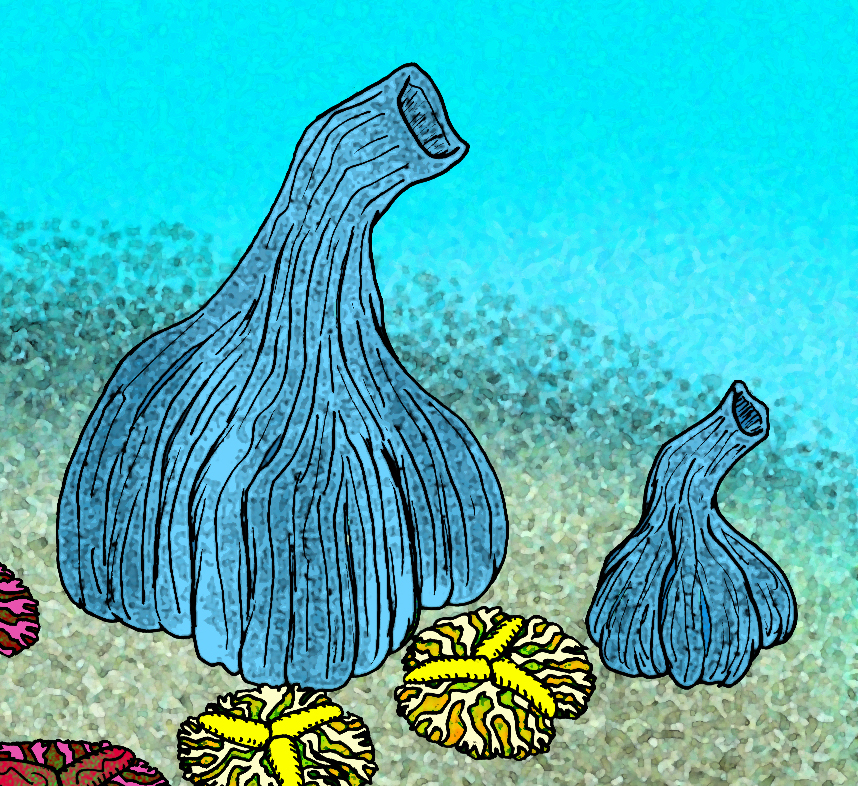
- Inaria karli with Albumares

Scientific classification
- Kingdom: Animalia
- Phylum: Cnidaria (?)
- Subphylum: Anthozoa (?)
- Genus: Inaria; Gehling, 1988
- Species: I. karli

Binomial name
- Inaria karli Gehling, 1988

= Inaria =

Inaria Temporal range: Ediacaran

Extinct genus of aquatic animals

Inaria is an Ediacaran fossil. It is found in the Chace Range in Australia, and the White Sea area in Russia.

It has radial symmetry and has been described as a tentacle-less cnidarian. The organism had a sac-like body that resembled a cluster of garlic or conical flask in shape, with a broad bulbous base embedded in the mud, and a tube extending above the sea floor. The body cavity of Inaria was a single chamber with the inner surface of the body wall forming deep invaginations that partitioned the cavernous stomach into several septa. In its deep environment it seems that it was the only species.

Inaria was found in lower shoreface muds. Australia Post issued a 50 cent stamp featuring Inaria on 21 April 2005 in a series entitled Creatures of the slime.

One species known as Inaria karli was named by Jim Gehling in 1988.

== See also ==
List of Ediacaran genera
