= Chondroplon =

Chondroplon Temporal range: late Ediacaran ~555 Ma
- Fossil of Chondroplon bilobatum

Scientific classification
- Kingdom: Animalia
- Phylum: Cnidaria
- Genus: †Chondroplon; Wade, 1971
- Species: †C. bilobatum

Binomial name
- †Chondroplon bilobatum Wade, 1971

Extinct species of marine invertebrate

Chondroplon bilobatum is a medusoid Ediacaran fossil. It has sand-filled tubes, although these may not have been sand-filled in life. It has a shield-like shape, with one end different from the other, and bilateral symmetry, and although it has been suggested that it possesses glide reflection symmetry, such suggestions are based upon a taphonomic effect deforming some specimens. Chondroplon was originally described by Mary Wade in 1971 from fossils found in South Australia. It was named after chondrophores — chitinous floats found on some kinds of colonial floating hydroids.

In addition to the Ediacara Hills in South Australia Chondroplon is also found in the White Sea area of Russia. The host rocks in these areas have been dated as 555 million years old.

The original interpretation was that Chondroplon is a chondrophorine cnidarian. It has also been interpreted as a deformed Dickinsonia. The Vendobionta theory has them as "fluid–filled quilts". As with most of the Ediacaran biota, scientists are yet to reach agreement on a firm classification for this enigmatic fossil.

== See also ==
- List of Ediacaran genera
