= Jim Gehling =

Australian palaeobiologist

James G. Gehling
- Born: September 20, 1946 (age 80)
- Education: University of Adelaide, University of California, Los Angeles
- Known for: Research on the Ediacaran Period
- Awards: Order of Australia, Victorian Premier’s Literary Award for Science (2009)
- Scientific career
- Fields: Palaeontology
- Workplaces: South Australian Museum

James G. Gehling (born 20 September 1946) is an Australian palaeontologist who studies the Ediacaran biota, some of the earliest known complex multicellular organisms. He is a senior research scientist at the South Australian Museum.

== Early life and education ==
Gehling received his B.Sc. Honours and M.Sc. degrees from the University of Adelaide. He later earned a Ph.D. from the University of California, Los Angeles, focusing on the taphonomy of the terminal Proterozoic Ediacara biota in South Australia.

== Career ==
Gehling began his teaching career at Wattle Park Teachers College and continued at the University of South Australia. From 1998 to 2000, he held the W.E. White Postdoctoral Research Fellowship at Queen’s University in Canada. Since 2001, he has been a senior research scientist at the South Australian Museum and an adjunct senior lecturer at the University of Adelaide.

At the South Australian Museum, Gehling's research focuses on the evolution of early animal life, particularly the palaeobiology and environmental context of the Ediacara biota and Early Cambrian fossils in South Australia. He manages the National Heritage Listed Ediacara Fossil Site at Nilpena, serving as a field laboratory for studying the Ediacara biota and its palaeoenvironmental settings.

== Contributions to geology ==
Gehling was among the researchers involved in establishing the Ediacaran Period, which the International Union of Geological Sciences ratified in 2004 as the last period of the Neoproterozoic Era. The period was officially unveiled by South Australian premier Mike Rann on 16 April 2005.

== Publications and media ==
Gehling co-authored "The Rise of Animals: Evolution and Diversification of the Kingdom Animalia," which won the Victorian Premier’s Literary Award for Science in 2009. He has appeared in various international media, notably alongside Sir David Attenborough in the 2009 documentary "First Life," featuring Ediacara fossils from South Australia.

== Honors and recognition ==
In recognition of his contributions to palaeontology, Gehling was awarded the honorary degree of Doctor of Science (honoris causa) by the University of Adelaide in 2014.

In the 2017 Australia Day Honours, Gehling was appointed an Officer of the Order of Australia (AO) for distinguished service to environmental science, and to higher education, as an academic and researcher in the area of palaeontology, and to the community of the Flinders Ranges.

In 2024, the species Tribrachidium gehlingi was named in honor of Professor Gehling, recognizing his extensive contributions to the study of Ediacaran fossils and the geology of the Flinders Ranges. This newly identified species exhibits distinct morphological features, including three slightly curved main arm-like structures that do not reach the outer margin, and three shorter secondary arms, distinguishing it from the previously known T. heraldicum.

In 2025, Gehling was awarded the Royal Society of South Australia’s Verco Medal.
