= Georg Gürich =

German geologist and paleontologist

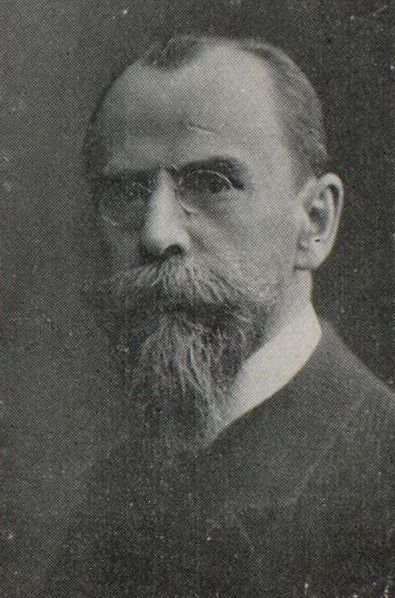
Georg Gürich (1912)

Georg Julius Ernst Gürich (25 September 1859, in Dobrodzień, Kingdom of Prussia – 16 August 1938 in Berlin) was a German geologist, paleontologist and university teacher, who wrote on Paleozoic geological formations in Poland and ranged through Guinea, Tanzania and Southern Africa (at the time German colonies), in search of unrecorded new species.

Georg Gürich studied geology in Breslau/Wrocław (1884–1891, Ph.D. 1882). In 1885, he first went to Africa, participating in a German scientific expedition to Nigeria and travelled in the western Sudan (1885), and in South-West Africa, now Namibia (May 1888 to January 1889), mostly in the western mountains from Otjitambi to Rehoboth, to do geological research on behalf of the "Southwest African Gold Syndicate" (Südwestafrikanisches Goldsyndikat), with the aim of exploring alleged deposits of gold. The gold did not materialise, but his published geographical account Deutsch-Südwestafrika. Reisebilder aus den Jahren 1888 und 1889 contains substantial additional information on the current political and social conditions in Namibia. In the following years, he travelled widely in Europe, Australia, Venezuela and Alaska and returned to Africa. In 1898 he was elected to the German National Academy of Sciences Leopoldina. In 1910 he became Director of the Geological Institute at the Hamburg Colonial Institute (later part of the University of Hamburg). He followed up his paleontological research on Namibia, with another field trip in 1928, resulting in many scientific publications.

He retired in 1934, and died in Berlin on 16 August 1938. His collections are partly preserved in the Geological Museum of the University of Wrocław.

The Devonian to Carboniferous bivalve genus Guerichia Rzehak, 1910, the Devonian tentaculitid genus Guerichina Bouček & Prantl, 1961, the Devonian agnathan genus Guerichosteus Tarlo, 1964, the Devonian rugosan genus Guerichiphyllum Różkowska, 1969, and several animal, foraminifer, and plant species were named in his honour.
