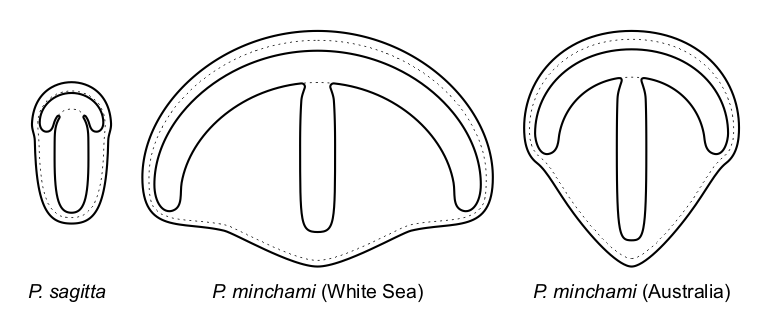
- Schematic reconstructions of P. sagitta and P. minchami

Scientific classification
- Kingdom: Animalia
- Phylum: incertae sedis: Mollusca?
- Genus: †Parvancorina Glaessner 1958

Type species
- P. minchami Glaessner 1958

Species
- P. minchami Glaessner, 1958; P. sagitta Ivantsov, 2004

= Parvancorina =

Parvancorina Temporal range: Ediacaran, around 558–555 Ma

Genus of fossil arnimal

Parvancorina is a genus of shield-shaped bilaterally symmetrical fossil animal that lived in the late Ediacaran seafloor. Outwardly, its fossils are only superficially similar to Cambrian arthropods, but in the structure of the underside of its body and its mode of locomotion, Parvancorina is close to mollusks.

== Etymology ==
The generic name is derived from a crasis compound word from the Latin parva ancora (small anchor).

The specific name of the type species, P. minchami, honors Mr. H. Mincham, the private collector, who in 1957 had collected and presented a number of fine specimens of Ediacaran fossils to the South Australian Museum.

The specific name of P. sagitta is the Latin word sagitta (arrow), in direct reference to the arrow-like shape.

== Occurrence ==
P. minchami fossils were first discovered in the Ediacara Member of the Rawnslay Quartzite, Flinders Ranges, in South Australia. This species is also known from deposits of the Verkhovka, Zimnegory and Yorga Formations in the White Sea area of the Arkhangelsk Region, Russia. Additionally, similar poorly preserved Parvancorina sp. fossils were found in the Lyamtsa Formation of this Russian region. This Species is also recorded from Sursager area in Jodhpur region, Sonia Formation of Marwar Supergroup in India.

P. sagitta is found in the Verkhovka formation on the Solza River, White Sea area of the Arkhangelsk Region, Russia.

Australian fossils

== Description ==
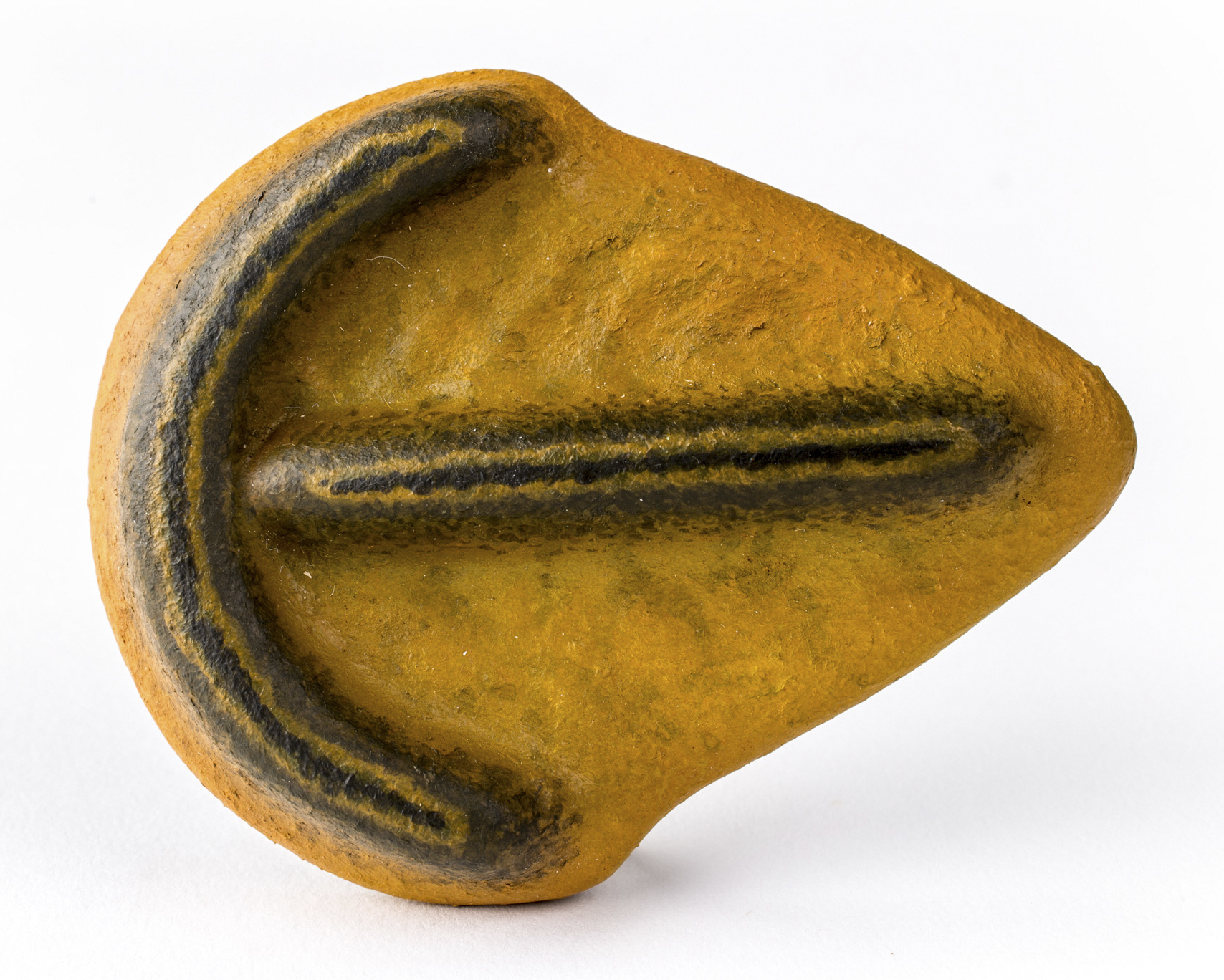
Australian Parvancorina minchami life restoration at MUSE - Science Museum in Trento, Italy

It has a raised ridge down the central axis of symmetry. This ridge can be high in unflattened fossils. At the 'head' end of the ridge there are two quarter-circle-shaped raised arcs attached. In front of this are two nested semicircular lines.

The fossils are normally about 1 centimetre (0.39 inches) in each of width and length, but can be up to 3.0 centimetres (1.2 inches).

== Affinity ==
Previously, ‘’Parvancorina’’ was grouped with Cambrian trilobite-like arthropods, such as Skania from the Burgess Shale Biota, Canada, and Primicaris from the Chengjiang Biota, China. Thin transverse ridges beneath the shield in Australian specimens were interpreted as limbs, but according to recent data, these are internal structures (possibly muscle impressions). The growth form of Parvancorina is unusual for an arthropod.

The ventral side of Parvancorina lacked limbs and consisted of a broad muscular sole, similar to a molluscan foot; it secreted mucus that facilitated locomotion and attachment to the substrate. The animal is assigned to the clade Lophotrochozoa, but its direct classification as a mollusk remains in question.

== Lifestyle and habitus ==
Parvancorina typically lived with their "heads" parallel to the current direction. Overfolding of the fossils from all sides contradicts any form of stalked attachment to the sea floor. They are suggested to have been mobile and able to actively orientate their bodies towards the current direction, with smaller individuals from the Ediacara biota in Australia often found in close association with each other. They have been proposed to be filter feeders, using their body ridges to direct water towards feeding structures, with deposit feeding being a possible but less likely ecology.

== See also ==
- List of Ediacaran genera
