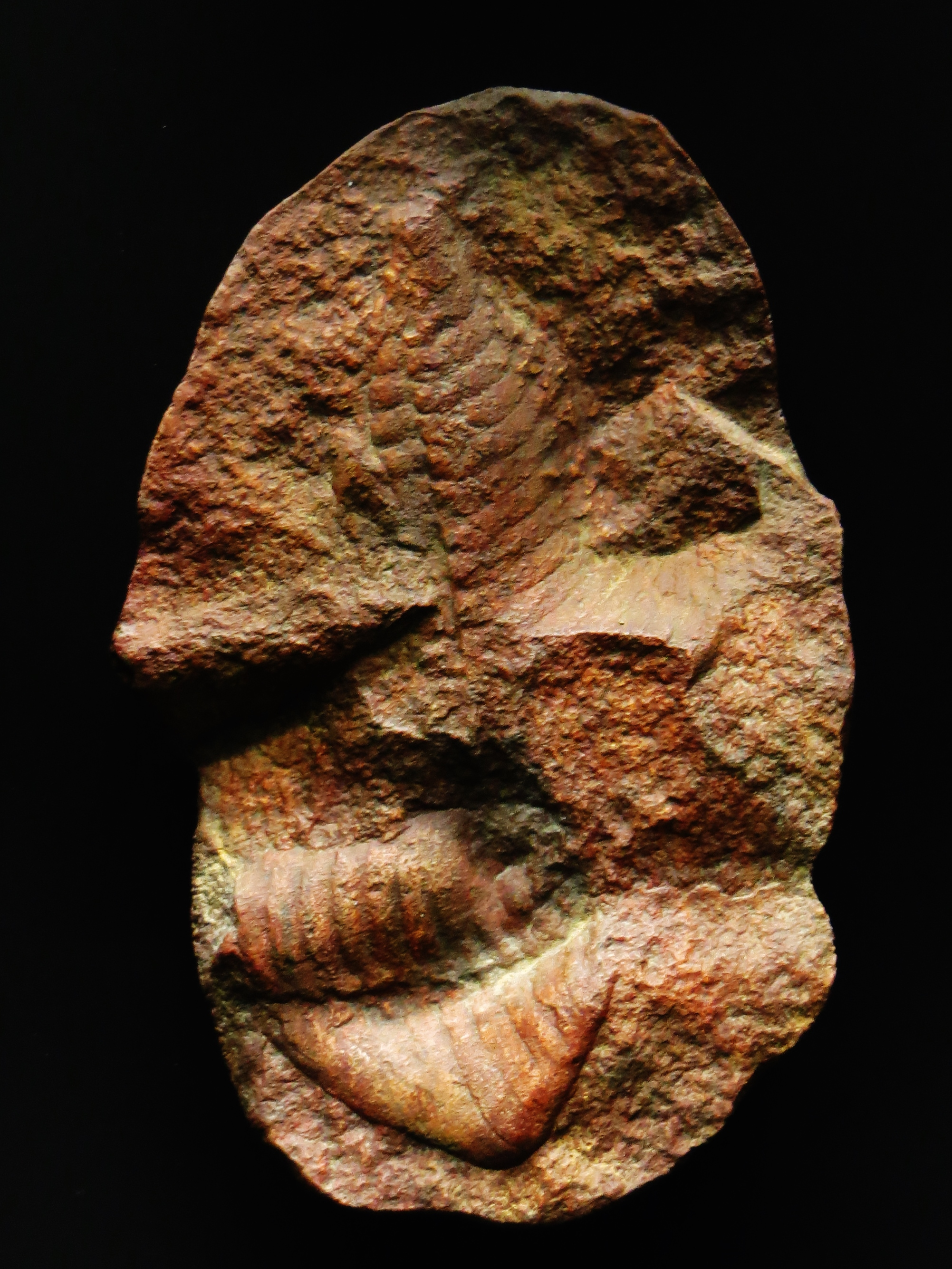
- Fossil of the type genus, Pteridinium

Scientific classification
- Kingdom: Animalia
- Phylum: †Petalonamae
- Class: †Erniettomorpha
- Family: †Pteridinidae; Richter, 1955

Genera
- †Pteridinium; †Archangelia; †Swartpuntia

= Pteridinidae =

Pteridinidae Temporal range: late Ediacaran ~567.3–541 Ma (Possible Cambrian records)

Extinct family of multi-folite frondose organisms

Pteridinidae is an extinct family of the class Erniettomorpha, which is considered a part of the wider phylum Petalonamae. They were alive during the late Ediacaran, from around 567.3 to 541 Ma, and are most notable for their multi-folite, three vaned appearance, and infaunal lifestyle. There are also tentative Cambrian records, some dating as early as 518 Ma.

== Description ==
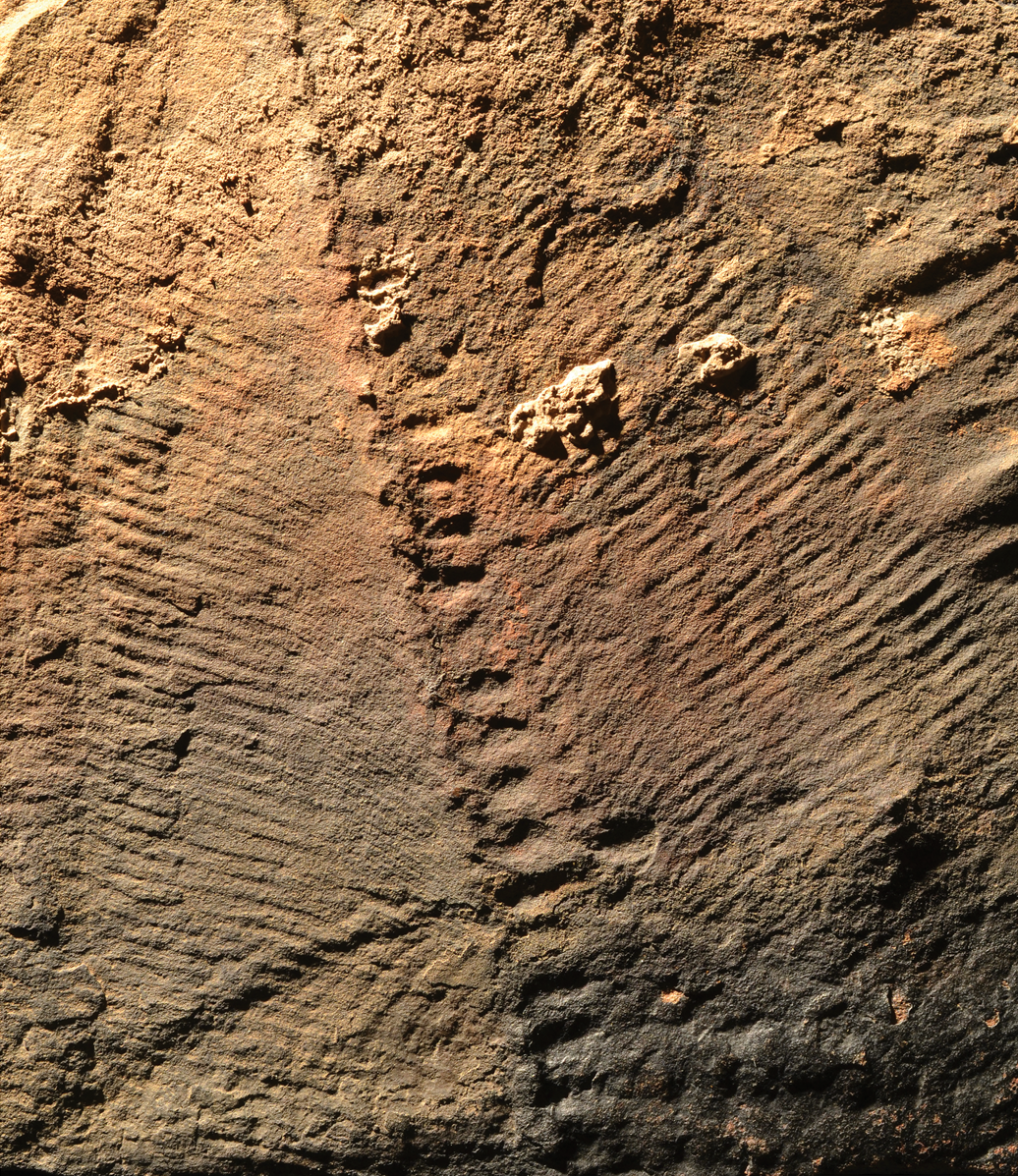
Fossil of Swartpuntia germsi, partially overlain by a Pteridinium.

Created by Richter (1955), the Pteridinidae are described as being leaf-like, elongated structures, referred to as petaloids. They notably feature the glided symmetry as seen in other petalonamids, with the tubular modules joining at a distinct median groove. Alongside this, they are also multi-folate in nature, being composed of up to three petaloids, instead of two as is seen in other petalonamids. They also do not have any stem or holdfast structures, although the genus Swartpuntia boasts a large, segmented central stalk.

== Distribution ==
Genera of the family Pteridinidae are primarily known from the Nama Group in Namibia, Africa, although there are also records from outside of Africa, some more tentative than others, these being the Cid Formation and Floyd Church Formation in North Carolina, the Rawnsley Quartzite in Australia, the Ust' Pinega Formation in Russia, the Dengying Formation in China, the Ediacaran strata of the Wood Canyon Formation in Nevada, as well as the Blueflower Formation in Canada.

There are also tentative Cambrian records, these being the Cambrian strata of the Wood Canyon and Poleta Formations in Nevada, as well as the Uratanna Formation in South Australia. These records have recently been called into question by Runnegar et al., with a majority of them, excluding the Australian records, possibly being assignable to other frondose Cambrian taxa.

== Taxonomy ==
Pteridinidae currently includes the following genera:

- †Pteridinium Gürich, 1933
  - †Pteridinium simplex Gürich, 1930
  - †Pteridinium carolinaensis St. Jean, 1973
- †Archangelia (?) Fedonkin, 1979
  - †Archangelia valdacia Fedonkin, 1979
- †Swartpuntia Narbonne et al., 1997
  - †Swartpuntia germsi Narbonne et al., 1997

=== Taxonomic history ===
Rangea was originally considered to be a pteridinid by Richter (1955), although Glaessner (1979) would erect a separate family referred to as the Rangeidae, seeing Rangea be moved out of Pteridinidae, leaving Pteridinium as its sole member. This would remain until Runnegar et al. (2024) would note the striking similarities between Pteridinium and Swartpuntia, specially after the discounting of Swartpuntia bearing a stem. As such, Swartpuntia would join Pteridinium, although it was noted that Swartpuntia may be a junior synonym of Nasepia, another erniettomorph.

Archangelia would be placed into the Pteridinidae family in 1985 by Mikhail Fedonkin, although later in 2011, researchers in Erwin et al. (2011) went through a majority of Ediacaran taxa, although they would remove dozens of taxa from the analysis, including Archangelia, most likely due to it only have a single fossil and counter fossil. Two years prior to Archangelia's placement, Valdainia and Podolimirus would be described in 1983 by Fedonkin, and placed into the Pteridinidae. These specimens were notably poor in the preservation, and it wouldn't be until 2015 when more substantial material would be found of Podolimirus. Here, it would not only be realised that Podolimirus instead belonged to the Proarticulata, but that Valdainia was a more poorly preserved specimen of Podolimirus, thus seeing both removed from the family thereafter.
