= Miettia =

Miettia Temporal range: latest Ediacaran ~around 548.8–545.1 Ma

Scientific classification
- Kingdom: Animalia
- Phylum: †Petalonamae
- Class: †Erniettomorpha
- Genus: †Miettia; Hofmann et Mountjoy, 2010
- Species: †M. salientensis

Binomial name
- †Miettia salientensis Hofmann et Mountjoy, 2010

Extinct ovate shaped genus of erniettomorph

Miettia is an extinct organism from the latest Ediacaran of Canada, and was alive sometime around 548.8 – 538.8 Ma. It has an ovate to elliptical shaped body, and is commonly placed within the class Erniettomorpha. It is a monotypic genus, containing only Miettia salientensis.

== Discovery and naming ==
The holotype, and potential fossils, of Miettia were found in the "Upper" section of the Miette Group, in British Columbia of Canada between 1995 and 2001, and was formally described and named in 2010.

The generic name Miettia derives from the place name "Miette Group", from which the fossils were found. The specific name salientensis derives from the place name "Salient Mountain", due to its occurrence in that section of the Miette Group.

== Description ==
Miettia salientensis is a large ovoid to elliptical shaped organism, bearing transverse segments, and has a lightly lobate outer margin. The fossil is also further segmented into several elongated, slightly divergent panels which join together at a zig-zag junction. The holotype is noted to be 26 cm (10 in) in length and 23 cm (9 in) in width, whilst the outer lobate margin reaches up to 1 mm (0.04 in) in width. The segments notably meet this margin at oblique angles, whilst they have a spacing of 2 mm (0.1 in) at the anterior of the fossil, and reach 6 mm (0.2 in) near the middle. Another, more fragmentary specimen is known, with the visible areas reaching up to 3 cm (1.2 in) in length and 9 cm (3.5 in) in width, whilst the modules spacing range between 1.5–2.3 mm (0.1–0.1 in).

== Affinities ==
When it was first described in 2010, Miettia was noted to bear superficial similarities to the erniettomorphs Phyllozoon, and Swartpuntia. The similarities between Miettia and Phyllozoon are noted to be the similar sizes, the construction of their modules, and the alternating nature of the modules when joining at the median line, although it was noted that Miettia's panels are unequal in width and the modules being irregular in nature. Despite this, it was still noted that its affinity may lie with the erniettomorphs. Miettia has since been referred to the Erniettomorpha in subsequent papers.

== See also ==
- List of Ediacaran genera
