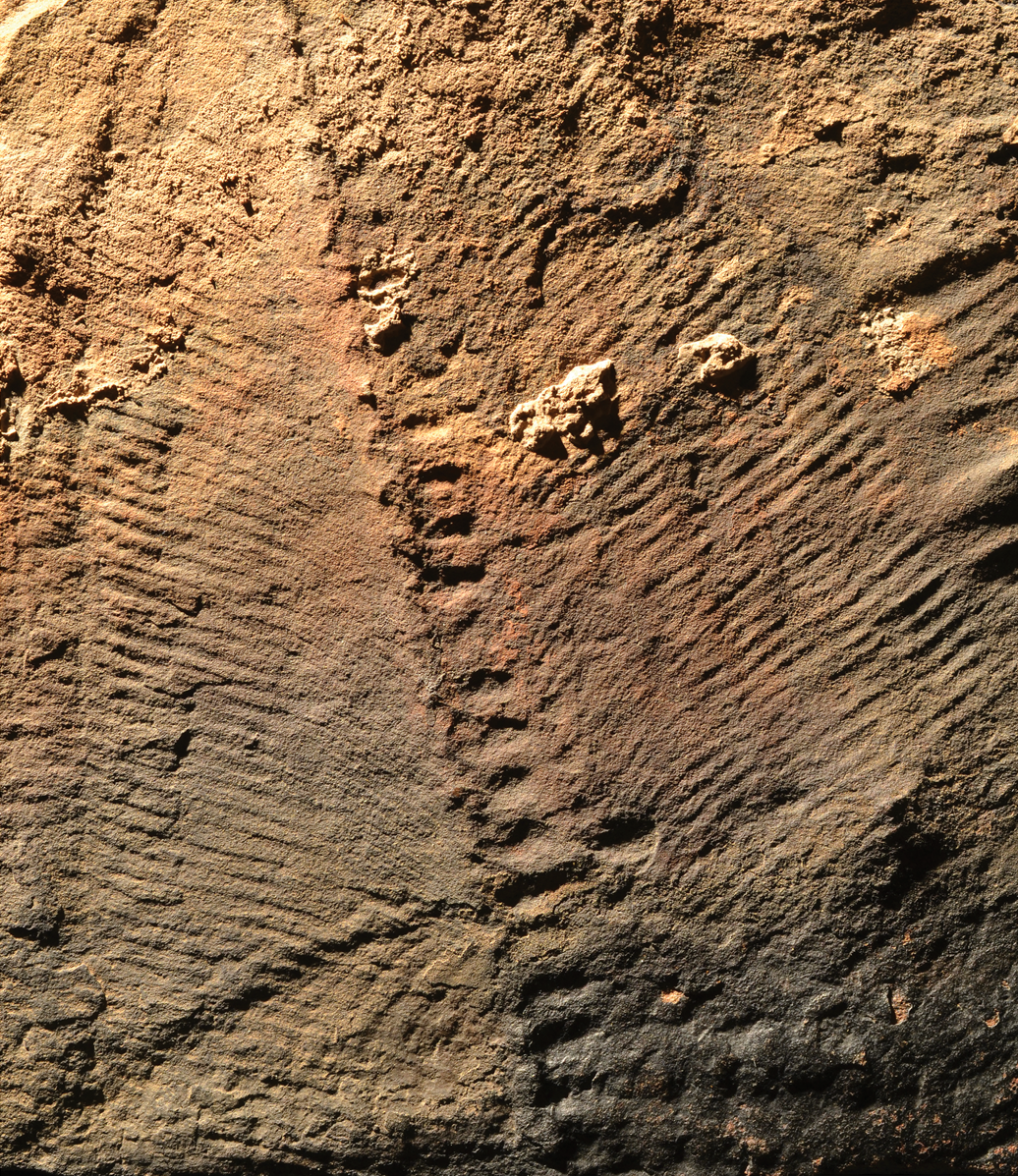
- Fossil of Swartpuntia germsi, partially overlain by a Pteridinium.

Scientific classification
- Kingdom: Animalia
- Phylum: †Petalonamae
- Class: †Erniettomorpha
- Family: †Pteridinidae
- Genus: †Swartpuntia; Narbonne et al., 1997
- Species: †S. germsi

Binomial name
- †Swartpuntia germsi Narbonne et al., 1997

= Swartpuntia =

Swartpuntia Temporal range: late Ediacaran ~547–541 Ma (Possible Cambrian records)

Extinct genus of Ediacaran fossil

Swartpuntia is an extinct organism from the late Ediacaran of Namibia, and was alive around 547 – 540 Ma, with possible records in the lower Cambrian of Nevada at 518 Ma, and older Ediacaran records from Canada at 567.3 Ma. It is a part of the Erniettomorpha class, and is known to be composed of three vanes attached to a large, segmented central stalk. It is a monotypic genus, containing only Swartpuntia germsi.

Recent studies done in the Nasep Quartzite Member of the Schwarzrand Formation, the type locality of Nasepia, have found new fossil material which infers that Swartpuntia may either be more closely related to, or a junior synonym of, Nasepia.

== Discovery and naming ==
Fossils of Swartpuntia were found in the Spitskop Member of the Nomtsas Formation in Namibia, Africa in 1995, and were formally described and named in 1997.

The generic name Swartpuntia derives from the place name "Farm Swartpunt", which itself translates to "black point", in reference to the cuesta of dark coloured rocks where the fossils were found. The specific name germsi is in honour of Gerard Germs, a palaeontologist who has studied the stratigraphy, sedimentology and paleontology of the Nama Group, from where the fossils can be found.

== Description ==
Swartpuntia germsi is a leaf-like organism, with a notable transversely segmented central stalk, with up to three petaloids attached to it. The whole frond could get up to 190 mm (7 in) in length and up to 140 mm (6 in) in width. The outer margin in the petaloids are serrated in nature, with a 1 mm (0.04 in) thick groove on the outside of these serrations. The segments that make up a petaloid number up to 100 in the largest specimens, are between 1.8–2.1 mm (0.07–0.08 in) in width at the base, and get up to 2.4–4.5 mm (0.09–0.18 in) at the margin. The central stalk can get up to 15 mm (0.6 in) wide, and terminates just 25 mm (1 in) before the distal point of the frond. Notably, the central stalk is marked with v-shaped ridges between 3–5 mm (0.12–0.20 in) in length and spaced a part by 3–5 mm (0.12–0.20 in).

Swartpuntia was previously described to have a stem, although recent studies refute this, noting that the stem is only visible in the holotype fossil, and that this itself may be a result of the overlapping matrix surrounding the fossil. This was further backed with the collection of new fossil material, showing no continuation of the central stalk beyond the proximal margins of the fossil, even after preparation of the fossils.

== Affinities ==
Before it was described, the holotype fossil of Swartpuntia was informally compared to the erniettomorph Nasepia in 1995. With this, when described, Swartpuntia would be placed in the phylum Petalonamae, although it was noted that there were enough distinct differences between the two genera that warranted Swartpuntia being placed into its own genus, mostly due to the fact that Swartpuntia is notably larger in size to Nasepia, and Nasepia preserves no visible central stalk, and itself is composed of poorly preserved fossils. Alongside this, it was also noted that Swartpuntia resembles other frondose taxa, such as Charnia and Charniodiscus, due to the presence of a central stalk passing through segmented petaloids. Although it was noted that Swartpuntia does not have any second-order branches as seen in Charnia and Charniodiscus, implying only a close relation instead of a direction relation. Swartpuntia was also compared to Pteridinium, which was noted to have also been found in same rocks, and also both bear a multi-folate construction in having three petaloids.

There were also comparisons made with Chondroplon, which prior to Swartpuntia's description had been regarded as either a deformed Dickinsonia or Pteridinium. One last comparison in the 1997 description was to Dickinsonia, which notably there are very few, with Dickinsonia being circular to elongate in nature with asymmetrical segments joining at a midline, whilst Swartpuntia is multi-folate in nature and bears a large central stalk. Alongside this, fossils of Dickinsonia are also commonly found shrunk or contracted, whilst fossils of Swartpuntia are not, although it is noted this may be due to the different taphonomic processes occurring for both taxa. One similarity noted is that the general microscopic bauplan of both genera is similar enough to where fragments of each could be mistaken for the other, due to the quilted appearance of both, and the similar widening of segments towards the outer margin.

A recent study done in the Nama Group area had found a fossil, referred to as the "Arimas lycopod" due to its appearance to later Paleozoic lycopods such as Leptophloeum. The "Arimas lycopod" had been found in the type locality of Nasepia, the Nasep Quartzite Member of the Schwarzrand Formation, alongside a fragment of a Nasepia vane, and due to this notable co-occurrence of both Nasepia and the "Armias lycopod" on the same level, it was inferred that the "Armias lycopod" was the detached axial structure of Nasepia. As such, it has been noted that either Swartpuntia and Nasepia are more closely related than previously thought, or that Swartpuntia may be a junior synonym of Nasepia itself. Despite this, until further evidence is found, Swartpuntia was considered to be a Pteridinium-like frond due to the lack of a proper stem, and its multi-folate bauplan, being placed into the family Pteridinidae, which itself is under the class Erniettomorpha.

== Distribution ==
As well as being found in its type locality of the Nomtsas Formation, Swartpuntia has also been found in the older Aar Member of the Dabis Formation, making it the oldest occurrence of Swartpuntia known.

Alongside this, there have also been a range of tentative records outside of Namibia, namely in the Cid Formation in North Carolina, the Ediacaran strata of the Wood Canyon Formation in Nevada, and the lower sections of the Blueflower Formation in Canada, which would be considerably older than the Dabis fossils. There have also been more tentative records of lower Cambrian occurrences of Swartpuntia, namely in the Cambrian strata of the Wood Canyon and Poleta Formations in Nevada, as well as the Uratanna Formation in South Australia. Some of these records have recently been called into question by Runnegar et al. (2024), primarily due to the poor preservation of the fossil material, and the age of some of the fossils, predominately those that are reported from Cambrian strata. The researchers suggested that the Cambrian records could potentially be assignable to other frondose taxa known from the Cambrian, although they further note that the Swartpuntia-like Australian Cambrian records may indeed be erniettomorphs, noting that further investigation is deserved.

== See also ==
- List of Ediacaran genera
