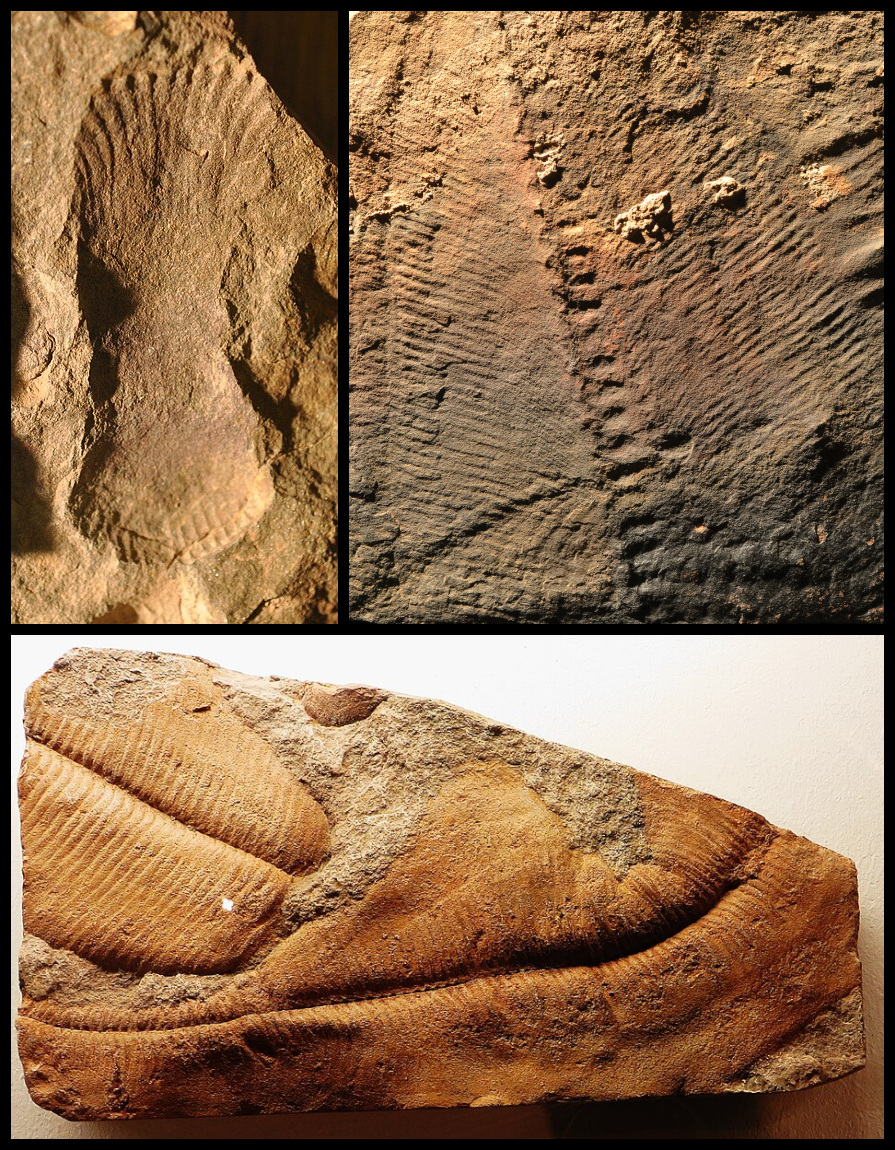
- Examples of members of the Erniettomorpha, with Ernietta top-left, Swartpuntia top-right, and Pteridinium bottom

Scientific classification
- Kingdom: Animalia
- Phylum: †Petalonamae
- Class: †Erniettomorpha; Pflug, 1972

Families
- †Erniettidae Pflug, 1972; †Pteridinidae Richter, 1955; Genera with uncertain classification; †Nasepia; †Phyllozoon ?; †Palaeoplatoda; †Miettia

= Erniettomorph =

Erniettomorph Temporal range: late Ediacaran ~567.3–538.8 Ma (Possible Cambrian records)

Extinct clade of fossils

Erniettomorpha is an extinct class, which is commonly considered a part of the phylum Petalonamae, and were around in the late Ediacaran period from 567.3 – 538.8 Ma, with potential records in the lowermost Cambrian of the United States at 518 Ma. They are commonly infaunal in nature, living partially buried within the substrate, and can also be found across the world, excluding the polar regions and South America. The type genus of the class is Ernietta.

== Description ==
Created in 1972 by Pflug to contain the 13 genera he had split out from the type genus Ernietta, Erniettomorpha is still widely used today for a number of valid taxa. These taxa are commonly constructed of tubular modules arranged in parallel arrays, which then form palisade-like structure. Some genera, such as Pteridinium and Swartpuntia are 'multi-vaned', which means they have more than two lobes, with Pteridinium having three, and Swartpuntia reported with between three to six. Others are noted to be bag-like to lyre-like in shape, such as Ernietta, and Tulaneia respectively. Phyllozoon is notably more simple than all the other genera, being more leaf-like in appearance.

Erniettomorphs are most commonly found in shallow-water marine environments, although they can also be found in deeper waters. They are notably seen being semi endo-benthic/infaunal in nature, where they are partially buried into the substrate. Alongside this, like most other Ediacaran organisms, they do not have an discernable digestive tract, instead feeding via osmosis in the surrounding water, making them osmotrophs. The buried nature of erniettomorphs would also make this lifestyle viable due to the high surface area to volume ratio it required, as the buried parts of the organisms, such as that seen in fossils of Pteridinium, would not need to be metabolically active, allowing them to reduce their metabolic activity enough to make osmotic feeding viable.

== Distribution ==
Erniettomorphs are fairly common around the globe, more so in Africa, although there are no records in South America or the Polar regions They have been found across the Nama Group of Namibia, in the Rawnsley Quartzite of South Australia,, the Inner Meadow site in Newfoundland and Labrador, the Upper Miette Group and Blueflower Formation in Canada, the Ediacaran strata of Wood Canyon Formation in Nevada, the Floyd Church Formation in North Carolina, the Shibantan Member of the Dengying Formation in China, the Ust' Pinega Formation in Russia, Ediacaran strata of the Kushk Series in Iran, and the Podolia region in Ukraine.

There have also been sparse and tentative records of erniettomorphs from the base of the Cambrian period, predominately assigned to Swartpuntia, with the sites being the Cambrian strata of the Wood Canyon Formation in Nevada, the Poleta Formation also in Nevada, and the Uratanna Formation in South Australia. Excluding the potential Australian records, which have been noted to deserve further investigation, due to the terrible preservation of the other Cambrian fossils, some researchers have noted that these could be assignable to other Cambrian frondose organisms.

== Taxonomy ==
Erniettomorpha includes the families Erniettidae and Pteridinidae, as well as genera not assigned to any family, which are as follows:

Family †Erniettidae Pflug, 1972

- †Ernietta Pflug, 1966
  - †Ernietta plateauensis Pflug, 1966
- †Tulaneia Runnegar et Horodyski in Runnegar et al., 2025
  - †Tulaneia amabilia Runnegar et Horodyski in Runnegar et al., 2025

Family †Pteridinidae Richter, 1955

- †Pteridinium Gürich, 1933
  - †Pteridinium simplex Gürich, 1930
  - †Pteridinium carolinaensis St. Jean, 1973
- †Archangelia (?) Fedonkin, 1979
  - †Archangelia valdacia Fedonkin, 1979
- †Swartpuntia Narbonne et al., 1997
  - †Swartpuntia germsi Narbonne et al., 1997

Unattributed to a family

- †Nasepia Germs, 1973
  - †Nasepia altae Germs, 1973
- †Phyllozoon (?) Jenkins et Gehling, 1978
  - †Phyllozoon hanseni Jenkins et Gehling, 1978
- †Palaeoplatoda Fedonkin in Palij et al., 1979
  - †Palaeoplatoda segmentata Fedonkin in Palij et al., 1979
- †Miettia Hofmann et Mountjoy, 2010
  - †Miettia salientensis Hofmann et Mountjoy, 2010

Due to the simplicity of Phyllozoon, noted in its original description paper, its affinities to the erniettomorphs has been regarded to be tentative, with its erniettomorph-like appearance potentially being a result of this simplicity or convergent evolution. Despite this, the simply appearance of Phyllozoon also makes it difficult to assess any further in-group and/or out-group relationships. Ventogyrus has also been noted to potentially be a part of this class. The genera Inkrylovia and Onegia are also junior synonyms of Pteridinium.

In 1972, Pflug had attempted to propose the erection of new orders, families and subfamilies under the Erniettomorpha class to contain the 13 new genera he had split out from Ernietta. In 1979, Martin Glaessner attempted to make sense of these proposals, only accepting two subfamilies, that being the "Erniettinae" and "Erniobetinae". Eventually, all these proposals would be discounted, with all the 13 new genera being synonymized back into Ernietta by Jenkins et al., 1981. Glassner would also see four families be formally erected for Pflug's described genera in 1979, two of which that are relevant, these being the Erniettidae, first mentioned by Pflug in 1972, and the Pteridinidae, first mentioned by Richter in 1955, which are still used.

== See also ==
- Rangeomorpha, a probable sister clade
- Proarticulata, sharing similar 'glide symmetry'
- Ediacara biota, for an overview of the bizarre late Ediacaran organisms
- List of Ediacaran genera
