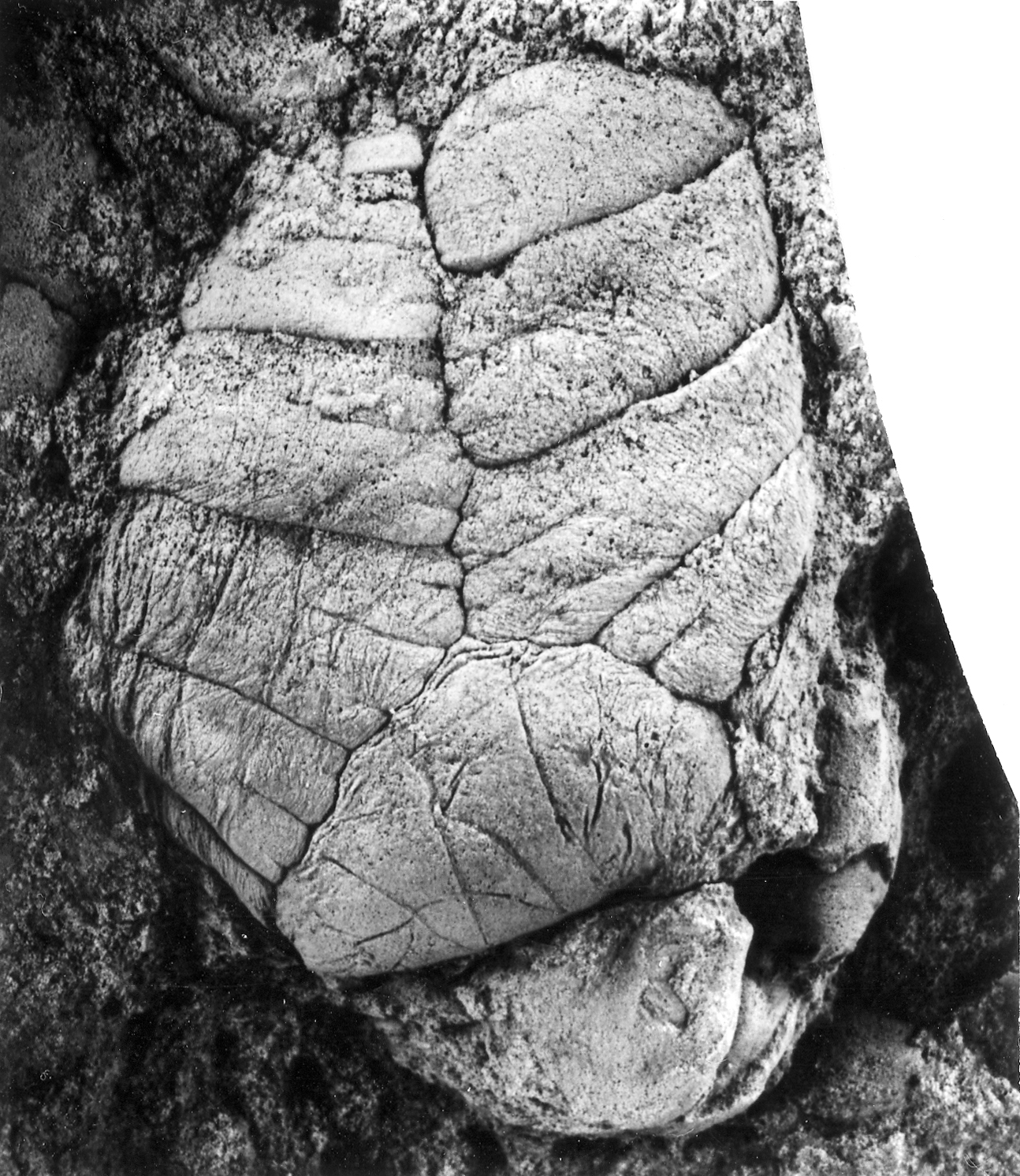
- A Ventogyrus fossil

Scientific classification
- Kingdom: Animalia
- Phylum: incertae sedis
- Genus: †Ventogyrus; Ivantsov and Grazhdankin 1997

Species
- Ventogyrus chistyakovi Ivantsov and Grazhdankin 1997

= Ventogyrus =

Ventogyrus Temporal range: 635–542 Ma

Extinct genus of invertebrates

Ventogyrus is an Ediacaran fossil found in the White Sea-Arkhangelsk region of Russia. It was first discovered in the Teska member of the Ust'-Pinega formation, in a thick lens of sandstone, originally sand dumped by storm waves that cut a deep channel through the shallow sea bottom where the organisms lived. Many individuals were preserved on top of each other, often torn or in distorted positions. As a result, it was originally thought to have had a "boat shaped" form and to have lived anchored in the sea floor. However, a nearby site discovered later by Mikhail Fedonkin yielded separate specimens which were beautifully preserved in an upright position and showed the internal anatomy.

Ventogyrus is now believed to have lived on or above the sea floor, an egg-shaped organism made of three modules (like the sections of an orange), all connected to a central rod. This three-fold, or triradial, symmetry is not usually found in the living world today, but it is also seen in other Ediacarans. The whole organism was wrapped by an external membrane. Individual fossils are approximately 6 cm in diameter and 12 cm long.

Fedonkin and Ivantsov suggested there was a stalk attached to the body of Ventogyrus. Specimens with an intact basal side show the presence of a triangular cross-section with a circular structure in the center. It is possible this is where a stalk may have attached. Such a structure could have tethered Ventogyrus to the sea floor, or hung down to stabilize its position in the water column. Unidentifiable fossil fragments that could have been the remains of stalks were associated with the specimens.

Ventogyrus is unique among Ediacaran fossils because so many have been preserved in three dimensions. The quality of its complex anatomical preservation is also unique among Ediacarans. This preservation allows paleontologists to more accurately conceive of how it, and other species similar in morphology, lived in and interacted with its environment.

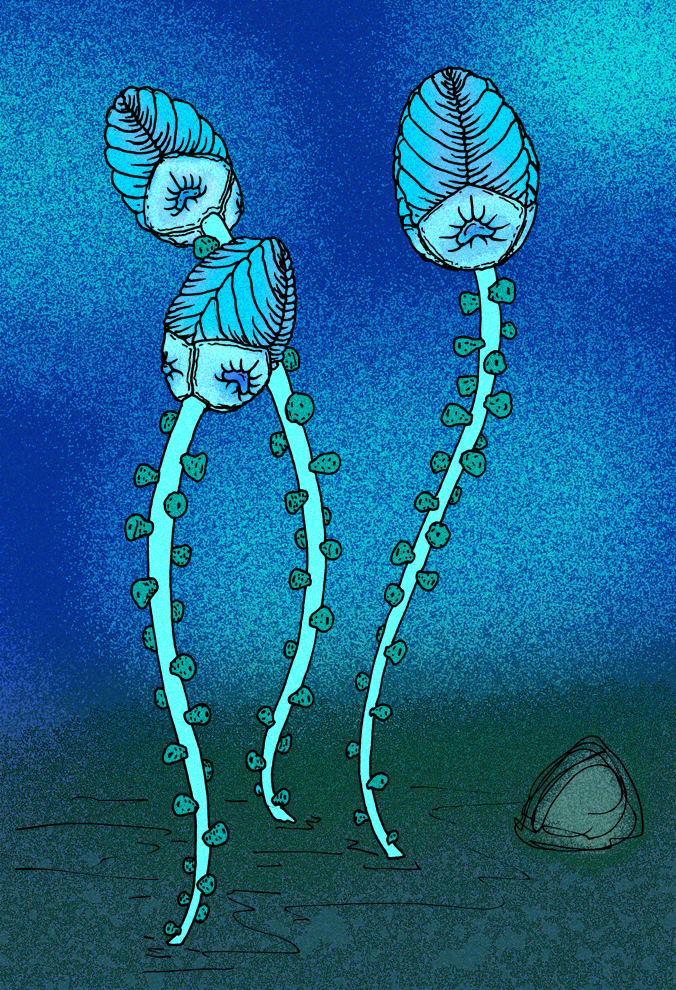
An artist's interpretation of Ventogyrus as an organism tethered to the seafloor.

== Internal anatomy ==
Inside the body, a single long wall divides each module in half. Attached to these walls are numerous transverse walls which divide the modules into chambers of decreasing size. The chambers are divided with the "gliding symmetry" common to many Ediacarans: the elements are offset from each other in an alternating sequence rather than showing bilateral symmetry across the dividing wall. A single undivided chamber is at the base of each module. It is thought that the internal chambers of Ventogyrus could have been filled with gas or bodily fluids. These chambers are only preserved when they are filled with sand, indicating that there may have been no cellular material within. The purpose of gas chambers within Ventogyrus would likely have been for buoyancy to stay in an upright position, and possibly to float above the sea floor.

Ventogyrus also has three distinct longitudinal channels running along the central rod connecting the three modules. Each of these channels branches, and the branches move outward through the body, branching repeatedly to make up an internal network. It is possible this network was a circulatory system.

== Relationships ==
Paleontologists have suggested different affiliations for Ventogyrus. Some follow Dolf Seilacher's theory that Ediacarans including Ventogyrus are an extinct phylum, the Vendobionta, related to no other living things. Ventogyrus is unusual among organisms proposed as vendobionts because paleontologists have also suggested relationships with post-Ediacaran fossils, including Erytholus from the Cambrian. Fedonkin has suggested, based on details of internal anatomy, that Ventogyrus could have been the float organism of a siphonophore colony (living examples include the Portuguese Man O' War). This reconstruction would make it a member of the phylum Cnidaria, related to jellyfish and corals. He has also suggested it could be related to animals in the early Cambrian Small Shelly Fauna whose "shells" were internal body supports. Ivantsov considers it an early representative of the phylum Ctenophora, the comb jellies, an ancient group whose members resemble but are not related to jellyfish. Ventogyrus does not fall obviously within one of the main form taxa of Ediacarans, the rangeomorphs, the erniettomorphs, and the trilobozoans, but it is also not obviously a member of a known biological taxon. While there is better information about the form of the living organism for Ventogyrus than almost any other Ediacaran, there is currently no consensus on what it was. However, investigators agree it was an animal.

== Fossil endangerment through piracy ==
Findings from studies on fossils from the Arkhangelsk region have been published in many popular science magazines and newspapers. These fossils have also been exhibited in the museums in Moscow, St. Petersburg, and Arkhangelsk. Due to this exposure, there has been an interest in collecting them, legally and illegally. Illegal sales often take place over the internet. Many scientific papers have contained data from fossils which were obtained illegally.
