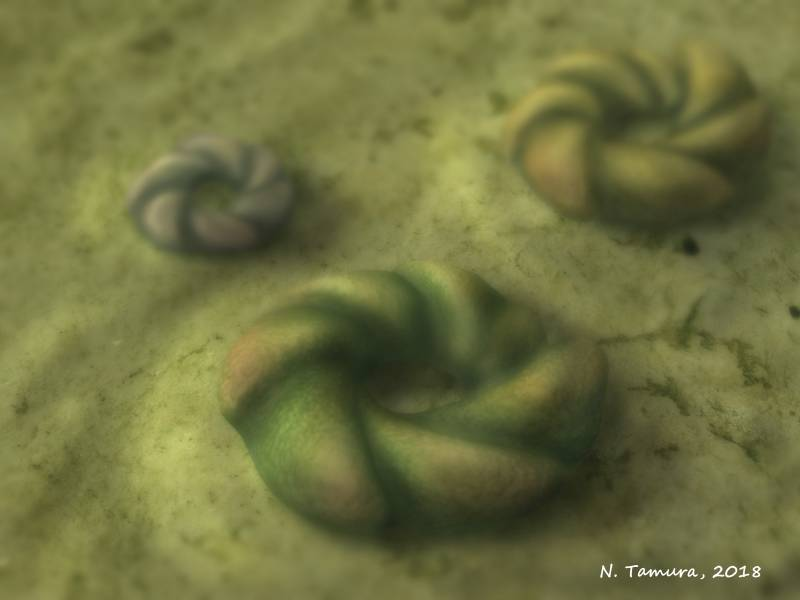
- Artist's reconstruction

Scientific classification
- Domain: incertae sedis
- Genus: †Obamus; Dzaugis et al., 2020
- Species: †O. coronatus

Binomial name
- †Obamus coronatus Dzaugis et al., 2020

= Obamus =

Obamus Temporal range: late Ediacaran ~555 Ma (Possible Tonian record)

Extinct organism from the late Ediacaran period

Obamus is an extinct enigmatic organism from the late Ediacaran of Australia, 555 Ma. It is torus in shape, and is a monotypic genus, containing only Obamus coronatus. There is also a probable record of an "Obamus-like" fossil from Tonian aged rocks in the Heavitree Quartzite.

== Discovery and naming ==
Fossil specimens of Obamus were found in the Ediacara Member of the Rawnsley Quartzite, in Nilpena Ediacara National Park, Flinders Ranges of South Australia in 2017, and were formally described and named in 2020.

The generic name Obamus is in honour of former President Barack Obama, due to his passion for the sciences, and the morphology of the organisms bearing similarities to his ears. The specific name coronatus derives directly from the Latin word of the same spelling, coronatus, to mean "wreath", due to the torus-like appearance of the organisms.

== Description ==
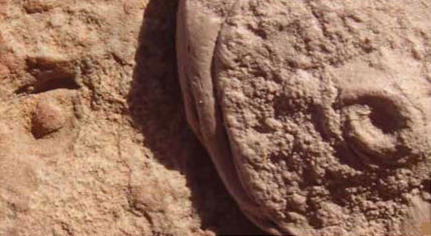
A fossil of Obamus coronatus, with a silicon mould of it to the right.

Obamus coronatus is a torus-shaped organism, getting up to 20 mm (0.8 in) in diameter. The body has six, overlapping arched grooves set into it, giving it a distinct wreath-like patterning. The arches are consistent, in that they all arch in the same clockwise direction. At one of the joins of a groove, there is a notable tuck, not only resulting in an asymmetric form, and also an ear-like morphology.

The fossils are all preserved in negative hyporelief, where they are impressions on the rock surface, and smaller specimens are less well defined and more compacted, appearing only as small pits in the rock. The outer margins of all Obamus specimens are very poorly defined, and sometimes features a small moat-like feature around the organism.

== Palaeoecology ==
The general lifestyle of Obamus has been inferred from its preservation, with it being noted that it was most likely a sessile benthic organism, being slightly embedded within the microbial mat-ground of the Rawnsley Quartzite. It also had some environmental tolerances, being found in beds that were estuarine to coastal during deposition. Meanwhile, they are also not found in areas with thin mat-grounds, suggesting the organisms may have preferred areas with thicker and mature mat-grounds.

A later study noted this to be the first example of substrate-selective dispersal in the Ediacaran, inferred from the large distances between even the closest specimens, discounting any probable use of stolons or budding, and instead possible sexual reproduction, as no specimens have been found entirely on their own either.

== Distribution ==
Obamus can primarily be found throughout the Ediacaran aged Rawnsley Quartzite in South Australia, although a recent study has also found Obamus-like fossils from the Tonian aged Heavitree Quartzite in Central Australia, predating the Rawnsley Quartzite fossils by some 290 Ma, with the study suggesting that Obamus was a part of an evolutionary event separate from the organisms of the Ediacaran Biota, and that metazoans evolved much earlier than thought.

== See also ==
- List of things named after Barack Obama
- List of organisms named after famous people (born 1950–1974)
