= Namacalathus =

Namacalathus Temporal range: Terminal Ediacaran, 549–542 Ma

Scientific classification
- Kingdom: Animalia
- Superphylum: Lophotrochozoa
- Clade: Lophophorata (?)
- Genus: †Namacalathus; Grotzinger et al., 2000
- Species: †N. hermanastes

Binomial name
- †Namacalathus hermanastes Grotzinger et al., 2000

Ediacaran fossil from Namibia

Namacalathus (Note: Nama, from the geological group where it was described, + Greek κάλαθος, kalathos, meaning "basket in the shape of a lily", or "wine goblet") is a problematic metazoan fossil occurring in the latest Ediacaran. The first, and only described species, N. hermanastes, (Note: Greek ἕρμα, herma, "sunken rock, reef", + νάστης, nastes, "inhabitant") was first described in 2000 from the Nama Group of central and southern Namibia.

== Discovery and naming ==
Fossils of Namacalathus were first discovered in Namibia and were previously described as specimens of Cloudina in 1990, and were named as a new genus in 2000. Fossils of Namacalathus have also since been found in Canada, Oman, Paraguay, and Russia.

== Description ==
A U–Pb zircon age from the fossiliferous rock in Namibia and Oman provides an age for the Namacalathus zone in the range from 549 to 542 Ma, which corresponds to the Late Ediacaran.

Alongside Namapoikia and Cloudina, these organisms are the oldest known evidence in the fossil record of the emergence of calcified skeletal formation in metazoans, a prominent feature in animals appearing later in the Early Cambrian.

== Classification ==
Shore et al. (2021) reported the first three-dimensional, pyritized preservation of soft tissue in Namacalathus hermanastes from the Nama Group (Namibia), and evaluate the implications of this finding for the knowledge of the phylogenetic relationships of this animal; they suggest it is an ancestor of lophotrochozoan animals such as brachiopods and worms.

== Paleoenvironment ==
There are only five occurrences of Namacalathus (Namibia, Canada, Oman, Siberia, Paraguay) known to date, all of which are found in association with Cloudina fossils.

Among the late Precambrian fossil assemblage in the Nama group, Namibia, Namacalathus far outnumber Cloudina and other poorly preserved taxa and ichnofossils found in the formation. The Nama Group fossils occur within thrombolitic facies of immense Proterozoic stromatolitic reefs. Namacalathus lived a benthic existence with its stalk attached to the sea floor by means of a holdfast, or possibly to algal mats growing on the reef surface.

== Morphology ==
The skeleton is believed to have consisted of high-magnesium calcite.

It has a unique shape with a cup on a stalk. The stalk is hollow all the way through and tapered from the bottom, ranging from 1 to 2 mm in diameter, and reaching 30 mm in length. The narrower top of the stalk connects to the cup. The cup is hollow and has a large hole in the top with the shell curving over forming a cup lip. Around the side of the globe are six or seven symmetrically arranged holes, called "windows". The wall curves inwards around each window in a formation called window lips. Each hole is slightly elongated vertically and expanded on the higher side. The size of the cup varies from two to about 25 mm, but averages 6.1 mm. The ratio of the height of the cup to the diameter is from 0.7 to 1.3. The fossil is lightly calcified, preserved as calcite crystals; its original morphology is unknown. The walls in Namacalathus are only 0.1 mm thick, and often deformed by the weight of the sediment. The windows were probably originally filled with organic matter during life, but the cup was likely to be open.

Siberian specimens from the borehole Vostok 3 were designated as new species, because they have, unlike the type species N. hermanastes, a significantly smaller size. Most specimens show sections of the perforated cup, ranging from 110 to 230 μm in diameter; one specimen (with a cup 120 μm across) has a stalk (30 μm in diameter). The walls of the cup are 10 μm thick.

Because the three-dimensional shape of Namacalathus is complex, and the wall is so thin, the fossils appear as a two-dimensional sections in a wide variety of shapes, including closed and open circles, irregular hexagons or heptagons, as well as heart and moon shapes.

== Ecology ==
Namacalathus was an ecological generalist, able to colonise a variety of settings in the mid- to off-ramp environs, adapting its size to suit the local conditions.

== Affinity ==
Namacalathus has typically been considered to represent a cnidarian-grade organism, due in part to its propensity for asexual reproduction by budding. Most recently, however (2015), it has been interpreted as a lophophorate based on detailed observations of its skeletal construction, which point to accretionary growth in the manner of brachiopods and bryozoans.

== See also ==
- List of Ediacaran genera
