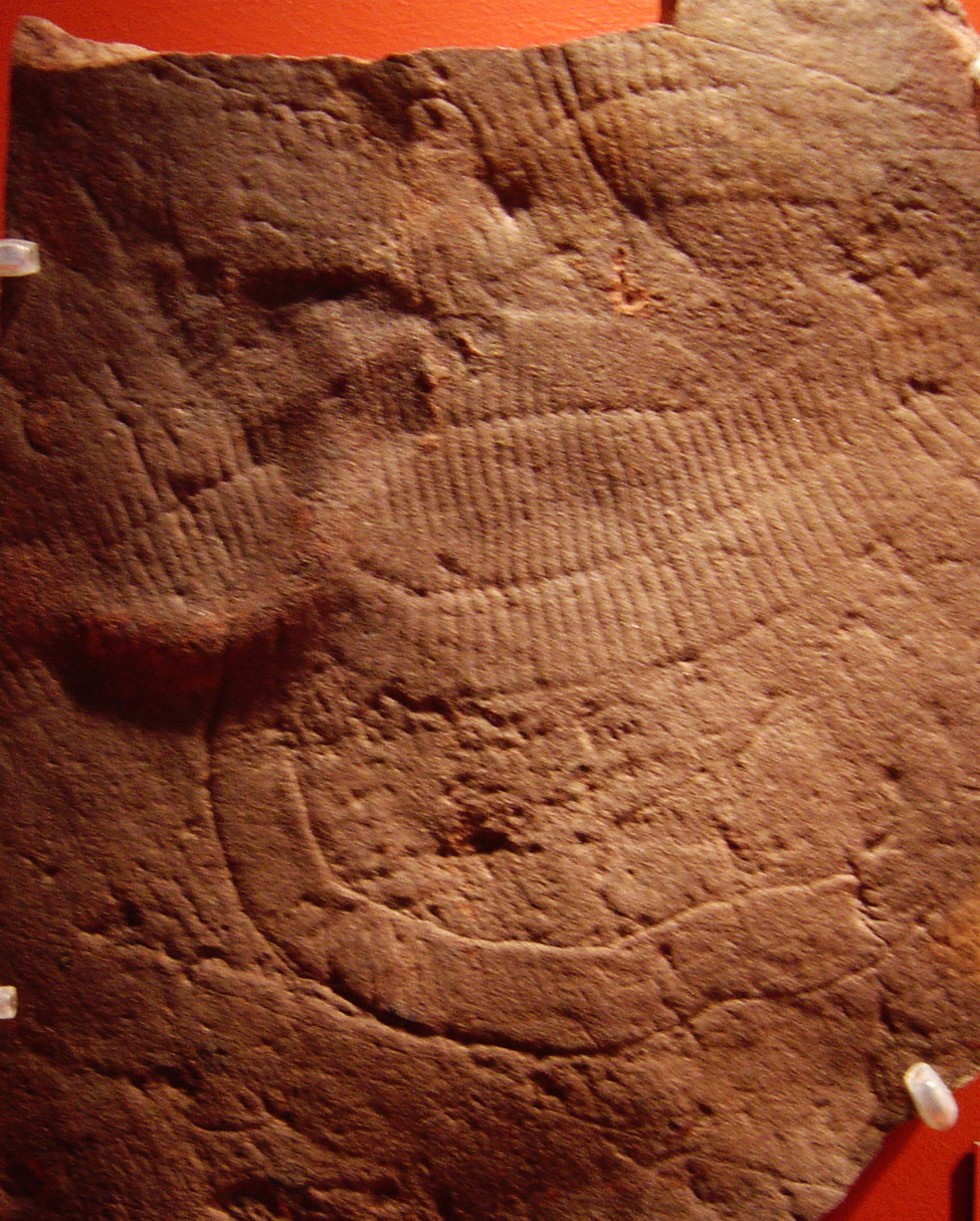
- Body fossil imprints of Aulozoon and Phyllozoon (top)

Scientific classification
- Domain: incertae sedis
- Genus: †Aulozoon; Gehling et Runnegar, 2021
- Species: †A. soliorum

Binomial name
- †Aulozoon soliorum Gehling et Runnegar, 2021

= Aulozoon =

Aulozoon Temporal range: late Ediacaran ~567–555 Ma

Extinct tube-like organism from the Ediacaran

Aulozoon is an extinct genus from the late Ediacaran of South Australia and Canada. It is notably tubular in appearance, and may have been sessile in life. It is a monotypic genus, containing only Aulozoon soliorum.

== Discovery and naming ==
Fossils of Aulozoon were found from the Ediacara Member of the Rawnsley Quartzite, Nilpena Ediacara National Park, in South Australia in 1969, and was formally described and named in 2021.

The generic name Aulozoon derives from the Greek word aulos, to mean "flute" or "pipe", in reference to its appearance; and zoon, to mean "animal". The specific name soliorum derives from the Latin word solium, to mean "bathtub", due to the number of watering holes within Bathtub Gorge, one of the areas fossils are found in.

== Description ==
Aulozoon soliorum is a large, tubular organism, measuring up to 1 m (3 ft 3 in) in length in the largest incomplete specimens, and around 1–3 cm (0–1 in) in diameter. The surface of the organism is notably smooth in appearance, with wrinkles appearing when the fossil bends, suggesting it may have been flexible in life. The tube is noted to end with a rounded termination, and was partially sand-filled during burial. Due to this, the fossils are preserved as convex hyporelief, meaning the fossils are impressions within the rocks. In a later study, the presence of a potential holdfast structure was inferred from the rounded terminations of the tube, with the structure itself most likely being buried beneath the mat-ground, with the main body covering it in burial and preventing the holdfast from being preserved. This potential presence would be confirmed with the discovery of Aulozoon in Canada, which notably are all preserved in positive relief where they protrude from the rocks surface, in the form of a single specimen being preserved with a structure at its terminal end in negative relief.

== History of research ==
Despite being named in 2021, fossils of Aulozoon were known as far back as 1969, being referred to as "Form D" by Martin Glaessner and interpreted as a "vermiform burrow". In 1995, the fossils would be assigned to the ichnogenus Palaeophycus as P. tubularis by Richard Jenkins. A year later in 1996, the fossils would be re-described as Aulozoon arteria by Jim Gehling, although this was not a formal redescription due to this being done in an unpublished PhD dissertation.

The name Aulozoon would then be brought to light by Seilacher et al. 2003 and 2005, causing the name to become a nomen nudum, due to the fact that Gehlings description hadn't been published, and as such there was no properly designated type specimen, no description or definition. This would remain the case for almost 20 years, when in 2021 Gehling and Runnegar would formally re-describe the fossils and rectify this long standing issue, still placing them under the name Aulozoon, although creating a new species name of soliorum.

== Paleoecology ==
Aulozoon is suggested to most likely have lived as a benthic, sessile organism, with it being anchored to the substrate via a small holdfast structure, and the tubular body rising up into the water column, although how high into the water column may have been dictated by the intensity and strength of the water current. This was inferred from many fossils overlapping with other organisms, as well as the many bends also present in a number of specimens. The presence of a holdfast structure also further supports this ecology.

== Distribution ==
Aulozoon is predominately known from the Rawnsley Quartzite in Southern Australia, although a study published in 2026 has found specimens of Aulozoon from the lower layers of the Blueflower Formation in the Northwest Territories of Canada, showing that it had a wider distribution outside of Australia, and appeared much earlier than thought.

== See also ==
- List of Ediacaran genera
