= Archangelia =

Archangelia Temporal range: late Ediacaran ~555 Ma

Scientific classification
- Kingdom: Animalia
- Phylum: †Petalonamae
- Class: †Erniettomorpha
- Family: †Pteridinidae (?)
- Genus: †Archangelia; Fedonkin, 1979
- Species: †A. valdacia

Binomial name
- †Archangelia valdacia Fedonkin, 1979

Extinct ovate shaped genus of erniettomorph

Archangelia is an extinct organism from the late Ediacaran of Russia, and was live around 555 Ma. It has an egg-shaped body, and possibly is a part of the Erniettomorpha class. It is a monotypic genus, containing only Archangelia valdacia.

== Discovery ==
The holotype fossil and counterparts of the holotype of Archangelia were found along the Syuzma river in the Ust' Pinega Formation, on the Onega Peninsula of Russia, and it would be formally described and named in 1979.

== Description ==
Archangelia valdacia is an elongated, ovate shaped erniettomorph, divided by a zig-zagged axial zone. Along this line there is up to 12 modules, with no more than 15 inferred if the fossil was completed. The whole frond is measured up to 45 mm (2 in) in length and 27 mm (1 in) in width, meanwhile the modules range from 2.5–4.5 mm (0–0 in) in length and 5–7 mm (0–0 in) in width. The length of the modules notably decrease a lot faster towards the distal ends than their width does, and also feature gently inclined transverse undulations, which are suggested to correspond to the number of segments in the axial zone.

== Affinities ==
When it was first described in 1979, Archangelia was simply classified as incertae sedis, meaning it was unknown what it belonged to. Then, in 1985, Archangelia would be placed in the family Pteridinidae, which is a part of the wider class Erniettomorpha, and commonly considered a part of the phylum Petalonamae. Researchers in Erwin et al. (2011) took a look at a majority of the fossil organisms found from the Ediacaran and placed or moved them into various classes, families, and phyla, but also decided to not include a large list of genera in the analysis due to poor fossil material, probable synonyms, and so forth, with Archangelia included in this list, due to the fact it is only known from a single fossil and counterpart fossil.

== See also ==
- List of Ediacaran genera
