= Rawnsley Quartzite =

Geologic formation in South Australia

- Stratigraphic range: Late Ediacaran; ~555 Ma
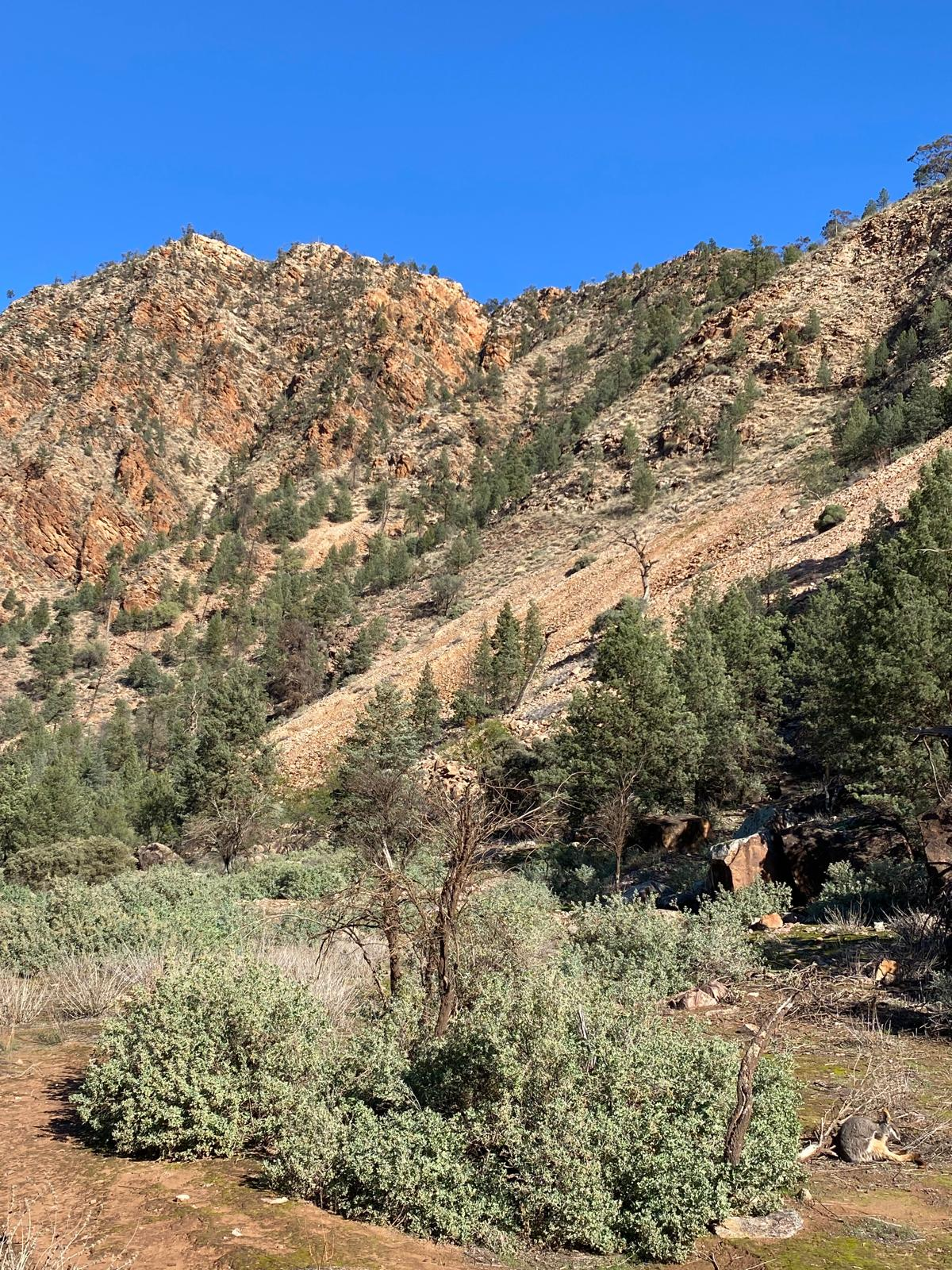
- Exposed rocks of the Rawnsley Quartzite
- Type: Formation
- Unit of: Pound Subgroup
- Sub-units: See: Members
- Underlies: (Unconformably) Uratanna Formation, Parachilna Formation
- Overlies: (Unconformably) Bonney Sandstone
- Area: 20,000 km^{2} (7,700 sq mi)
- Thickness: 250 m (820 ft) to 500 m (1,600 ft)

Lithology
- Primary: Sandstone

Location
- Region: South Australia
- Country: Australia

Type section
- Named by: Jenkins
- Year defined: 1975

The Rawnsley Quartzite is a late Ediacaran aged geologic formation in South Australia. Likely deposited some 555 Ma based on correlations to the Ustʹ Pinega Formation, the Rawnsley Quartzite is predominately composed of sandstone rocks, despite its name. The formation also contains a varied range of macroscopic fossils, most of which are referred to as the Ediacaran Biota, including fossils such as Dickinsonia and Arborea, most of which are found within the Ediacara Member, with a few from the Nilpena Sandstone.

== History of research ==
Prior to its formal description and naming, in 1971, Forbes would name the rocks of the formation as the "Rawnsley Quartzite Member", which at the time was a part of the "Pound Quartzite" formation that had been named in 1937 by Mawson. This would remain the case for only a few years, with a study published by Jenkins in 1975 suggested the members were actually distinct formations, which would see the "Rawnsley Quartzite Member" elevated to just the "Rawnsley Quartzite", and the "Pound Quartzite" elevated to the "Pound Subgroup". The "Ediacara Member" of the Rawnsley Quartzite would also be named in 1975.

== Geology ==
The Rawnsley Quartzite can be found outcropping in the Flinders Ranges of South Australia, where it is unconformably overlain by the Cambrian aged Uratanna Formation, whilst it is unconformably underlain by the sandstones of the Bonney Sandstone, and is a part of the wider Pound Subgroup, which itself sits within the Wilpena Group. Despite its name, the formation itself is predominately composed of sandstone rock, with quartzite only being found in the middle layers. It also contains two formally named members, and one informally named member.

=== Members ===
The Rawnsley Quartzite is composed of two formal members, and one currently informal member, which are as follows, in ascending stratigraphic order (lowest to highest):

- Chace Quartzite Member: About 250 m (820 ft) in thickness, the Chace Quartzite Member is primarily composed of white, fine- to coarse-grained sandstone, which is petee-bedded and feldspathic.
- Ediacara Member: About 350 m (1,150 ft) thick, the Ediacara Member is composed of various sandstones and quartzites. At the base of the member, there are predominately flat-laminated to rippled sandstone. This sandstone is khaki colored, which weathers to a red color when exposed, and is fine- to coarse-grained. Within these layers there can also be found white to brown massive feldspathic sandstone, which is medium- to coarse-grained. In the middle of the member can be found gray-white, fine- to coarse-grained sandstone, which is thin to medium-bedded and features wave ripples. Further towards the top of the member there are white, medium to coarse-grained arenite, which contains quartz and is feldspathic. It is also the primary but not the only fossil bearing member of the formation. In some areas, it can be found canyon incisions between 50–250 m (160–820 ft) deep into the underlying Chace Quartzite Member, and sometimes further into the underlying Bonney Sandstone, both of which unconformably underlie this member.
- Nilpena Sandstone/Upper Rawnsley Quartzite Member: Up to 500 m (1,600 ft) in thickness, the Nilpena Sandstone or Upper Rawnsley Quartzite Member is the informal one of the three, being at the very top of the formation, and contains a handful of fossil taxa, such as Phyllozoon hanseni, Dickinsonia rex, D. costata, Palaeophragmodictya reticulata, and Aulozoon soliorum. Like the Chace Quartzite Member, petee-bedding also occurs here. It is primarily composed of fine-grained sandstones. It is also sometimes informally referred to as the Upper Rawnsley Quartzite Member.

== Dating ==
The dating of the formation, and primarily the Ediacara Member, has been hindered due to the coarse-grained siliciclastic sedimentology of it. Despite this, there have been two grains dated through U-Pb dating. The first grain yielded an age of 561.9±15.1 Ma, whilst the second one yields an age of 596±10 Ma. Meanwhile, another single grain from the underlying Bonney Sandstone yielded an age of 566±24 Ma.

Along with these yielded dates, a date of 555±0 Ma was chosen, as the Ediacara Member is known to correlate with the Zimny Gory section in the Ustʹ Pinega Formation, Russia, and the formation itself would at least be younger than the date collected from the underling Bonney Sandstone.

== Paleoenvironment ==
The environment at the time of the Ediacara Member's deposition was that of a shallow-water one, ranging from estuarine, to shoreface, and coastal environments, inferred from the abundant presence of channelised and cross-bedded sandstones, as well as ripple-cross-laminated sandstones. This would also see the fossil organisms of the Ediacara Member placed notably close to the shoreline. Previous studies had a slightly wider range, with the environment going from the fair-weather wave base to a sub-storm wave base, as well as a delta-front, which ranged from a near to below the wave base. The shallow marine environment was also inferred from the relatively thick matgrounds commonly found in most fossil beds of the member, which would have also helped to support the community of organisms within the general area.

One researcher, Gregory Retallack, has regarded the Ediacara Member as being that of a terrestrial environment based on soil nodules, sand crystals, isotope data and dilation cracks found within it, although further studies done after have discounted these findings suggesting a terrestrial deposition for the member. Despite this piece of evidence, alongside a growing collection of other studies done before and after, Retallack still supports a terrestrial environment for the Rawnsley Quartzite. Another study done by Retallack in 2026 would see this supported still, although they would also perform more geochemical studies, which yielded results showing that there was a shallow-freshwater environment at the Rawnsley Quartzite, alongside a local, but limited, estuarine influence.

== Paleobiota ==
The beds at Nilpena Ediacara National Park contains a diverse, and complex system of Ediacaran organisms, from bilateral forms such as Parvancorina and Kimberella, to the classic Ediacaran forms such as Dickinsonia and Arborea. Due to its notable shallow environment, there is also a wide collection of algae forms, such as Flabellophyton and Longifuniculum, which are commonly referred to as "Bundles of Filaments" (BOF) in literature.

Color key: Taxon / Reclassified taxon / Taxon falsely reported as present / Dubious taxon or junior synonym / Ichnotaxon / Ootaxon / Morphotaxon

Notes
Uncertain or tentative taxa are in small text
~~crossed out~~ taxa are discredited.

=== Bilaterian ===
Bilaterians of the Rawnsley Quartzite
Genus	Species	Locality	Clade	Image
Ikaria	I. wariootia	1T-F	Bilateria, incertae sedis	
Kimberella	K. quadrata	NECP Bed-1	Bilateria, incertae sedis	
Uncus	U. dzaugisi	1T-F	Ecdysozoa, incertae sedis	
~~Velocephalina~~	~~V. greenwoodensis~~	NECP Bed-1	Animalia, incertae sedis	

=== Porifera ===
Poriferans of the Rawnsley Quartzite
Genus	Species	Localities	Clade	Image
Palaeophragmodictya	P. reticulata	TC-MM3	Reticulosa, incertae sedis	
Funisia	F. dorothea	1T-F; TC-MM3; TR-ARB	?Porifera, Olgunidae	

=== Petalonamae ===
Petalonams of the Rawnsley Quartzite
Genus	Species	Localities	Clade	Images
Arborea	A. arborea	NECP Bed-1	Arboreomorpha, incertae sedis	
Arborea	A. opposita	NECP Bed-1	Arboreomorpha, incertae sedis	
Akrophyllas (Formerly Arborea longa)	A. longa		Arboreomorpha, incertae sedis	
Charnia	C. grandis		Rangeomorpha, incertae sedis	
Charnia	C. masoni		Rangeomorpha, incertae sedis	
Charniodiscus	C. sp.	NECP Bed-1	Arboreomorpha, incertae sedis	
Glaessnerina	G. grandis		Rangeomorpha, incertae sedis Reclassified as Charnia grandis.	
Pteridinium	P. simplex		Erniettomorpha, Pteridinidae	
Pteridinium	P. sp.		Erniettomorpha, Pteridinidae	
Phyllozoon	P. hanseni		Erniettomorpha, Pteridinidae	

=== Proarticulata ===
Proarticulatans of the Rawnsley Quartzite
Genus	Species	Localities	Clade	Image
Andiva	A. ivantsovi	1T-F; TR-ARB	Cephalozoa, incertae sedis	
Archaeaspinus	A. fedonkini		Cephalozoa, Yorgiidae	
Dickinsonia	D. costata	NECP Bed-1; 1T-F; TC-MM3; TR-ARB	Dipleurozoa, Dickinsoniidae	
Dickinsonia	D. rex	NECP Bed-1; 1T-F; TC-MM3; TR-ARB	Dipleurozoa, Dickinsoniidae	
Dickinsonia	D. tenuis	NECP Bed-1; 1T-F; TC-MM3; TR-ARB	Dipleurozoa, Dickinsoniidae	
Marywadea	M. ovata		Cephalozoa, Sprigginidae	
Ovatoscutum	O. concentricum		Proarticulata, incertae sedis	
Praecambridium	P. sigillum	NECP Bed-1	Cephalozoa, ?Yorgiidae	
Spriggina	S. floundersi	NECP Bed-1; 1T-F	Cephalozoa, Sprigginidae	
Yorgia	Y. waggoneri	NECP Bed-1; TC-MM3	Cephalozoa, Yorgiidae	

=== Trilobozoa ===
Trilobozoans of the Rawnsley Quartzite
Genus	Species	Localities	Clade	Image
Albumares	?Albumares sp.		Albumaresidae	
Rugoconites	R. enigmaticus	NECP Bed-1; 1T-F; TC-MM3	Trilobozoa, incertae sedis	
Rugoconites	R. tenuirugosus		Trilobozoa, incertae sedis	
Tribrachidium	T. gehlingi	NECP Bed-1; 1T-F	Trilobozoa, Tribrachididae	
Tribrachidium	T. heraldicum	NECP Bed-1; 1T-F	Trilobozoa, Tribrachididae	

=== Other ===
Other organisms of the Rawnsley Quartzite
Genus	Species	Localities	Clade	Images
Arkarua	A. adami		?Edrioasteroidea, incertae sedis	
Aspidella	A. terranovica	1T-F; TC-MM3	?Animalia, incertae sedis	
Attenborites	A. janeae	1T-F; TR-ARB	Incertae sedis	
Aulozoon	A. soliorum	1T-F; TC-MM3; TR-ARB	Incertae sedis	
Conomedusites	C. lobatus	TC-MM3	Animalia, incertae sedis	
Coronacollina	C. acula	1T-F; TR-ARB	Animalia, incertae sedis	
Cyclomedusa	C. davidi		?Animalia, incertae sedis	
Ediacaria	E. flindersi		Eukaryota, incertae sedis	
Eoandromeda	E. octobrachiata		Animalia, incertae sedis	
Eoporpita	E. medusa	1T-F	Anthoathecata, ?Porpitidae	
Harlaniella	?H. sp.		Incertae sedis	
Inaria	I. karli		?Anthozoa, incertae sedis	Reconstruction of I. karli.
Mawsonites	M. spriggi	1T-F	Incertae sedis	
Medusinites	M. asteroides		Cnidaria, Cyclozoa incertae sedis	
Nilpenia	N. rossi		Incertae sedis	
Obamus	O. coronatus	1T-F; TR-ARB	Animalia, incertae sedis	
Parvancorina	P. minchami	NECP Bed-1; 1T-F; TC-MM3; TR-ARB	Animalia, incertae sedis	
Plexus	P. ricei	TR-ARB	Animalia, incertae sedis	
Pseudorhizostomites	P. howchini	NECP Bed-1	Animalia, incertae sedis	
Quaestio	Q. simpsonorum	1T-F	Animalia, incertae sedis	
Somatohelix	S. sinuosus		Incertae sedis	
Palaeopascichnus	P. sp.	1T-F; TR-ARB	Palaeopascichnida, incertae sedis	
Intrites	I. sp.	TC-MM3; TR-ARB	Palaeopascichnida, incertae sedis	

=== Flora ===
Flora of the Rawnsley Quartzite
Genus	Species	Localities	Clade	Image
Flabellophyton	F. stupendum		Incertae sedis	Line drawing of Flabellophyton lantianensis from the Lantian Formation
Flabellophyton	F. typicum		Incertae sedis	Line drawing of Flabellophyton lantianensis from the Lantian Formation
Liulingjitaenia	L. irregularis		Incertae sedis	Line drawing of Liulingjitaenia alloplecta
Longifuniculum	L. dissolutum		Incertae sedis	

=== Ichnotaxa ===
Ichnotaxa of the Rawnsley Quartzite
Genus	Species	Localities	Notes	Image
Helminthoidichnites	H. sp.		Burrows.	
Epibaion	E. costatus	NECP Bed-1	Feeding traces of Dickinsonia.	
Kimberichnus	K. teruzzii	NECP Bed-1	Feeding traces of Kimberella.	

=== Undescribed ===
Undescribed forms of the Rawnsley Quartzite
Genus	Species	Localities	Notes	Image
Form 1	sp. indet.	NECP Bed-1	Bilterial organism, bears similarities with Kimberella, although features a prominent "head" region at the front, and a "flange" at the rear.	
Form 2	sp. indet.	NECP Bed-1	Rounded organism, with a notable "head" shield.	

== See also ==
- Ediacaran biota
