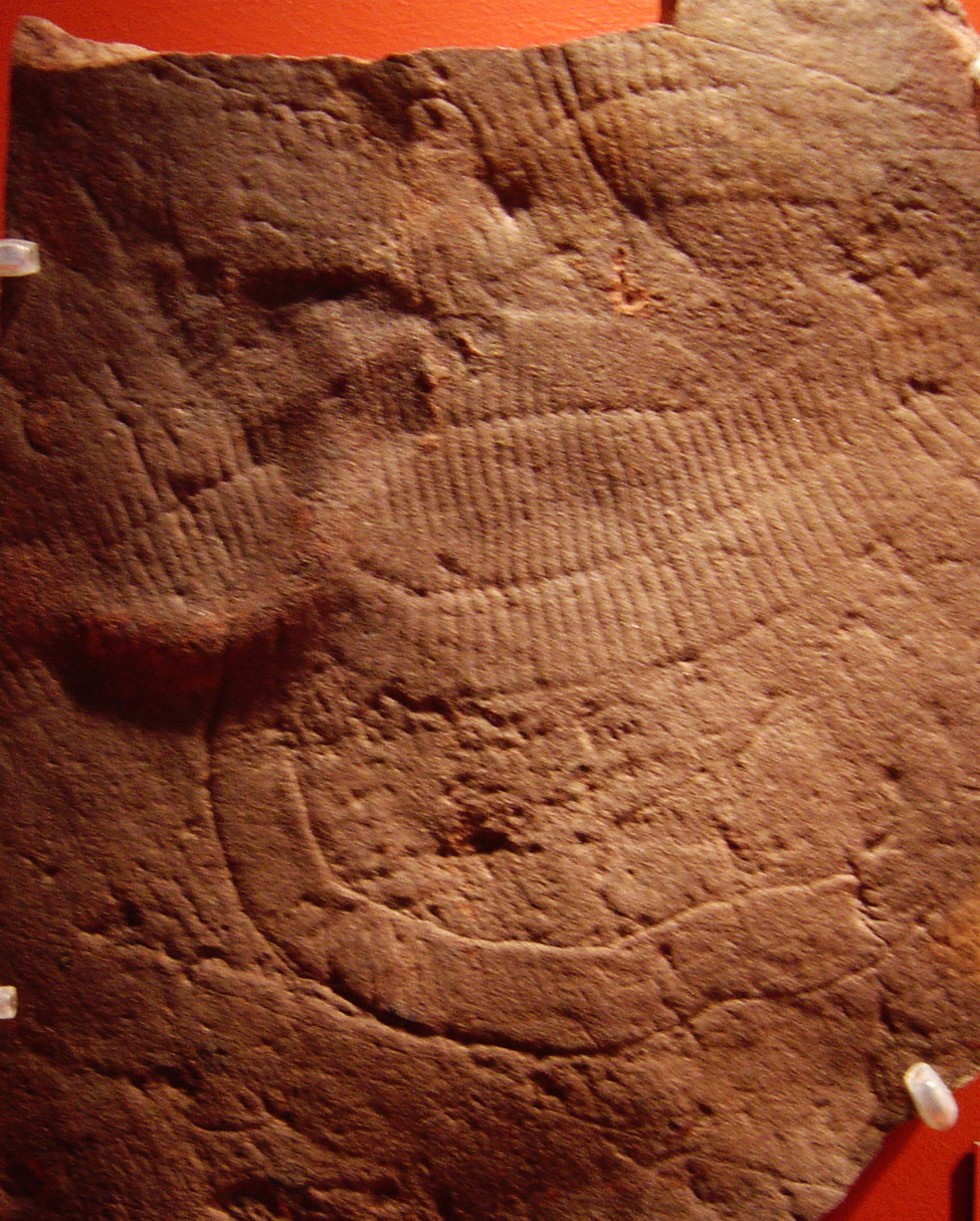
- Body fossil imprints of Phyllozoon and Aulozoon (bottom)

Scientific classification
- Kingdom: Animalia
- Phylum: †Petalonamae
- Class: †Erniettomorpha
- Genus: †Phyllozoon; Jenkins and Gehling, 1978
- Species: †P. hanseni

Binomial name
- †Phyllozoon hanseni Jenkins and Gehling, 1978

= Phyllozoon =

Phyllozoon Temporal range: Late Ediacaran ~555–550.78 Ma

Ediacaran organism

Phyllozoon is an enigmatic, extinct organism from the late Ediacaran of Australia and Canada. It has been interpreted as an erniettomorph, a window lichen, or a feeding trace of a proarticulate due to its very long and twisting form, although most recent studies agree on a erniettomorph affinity. It is a monotypic genus, containing only Phyllozoon hanseni.

== Discovery and naming ==
Fossil material of Phyllozoon was found in the Ediacara Member of the Rawnsley Quartzite, in Nilpena Ediacara National Park, Flinders Ranges of South Australia and was formally described and named in 1978.

The generic name Phyllozoon drives from the Greek word phyllon, to mean "leaf"; and zoon, to mean "animal". The specific name hanseni is in honour of Anibony Kym Hansen, who first found the fossils whilst studying geology at the University of Adelaide, but had lost their life in 1976 during a seismic exploration in Western Australia, before the fossils were described.

== Description ==
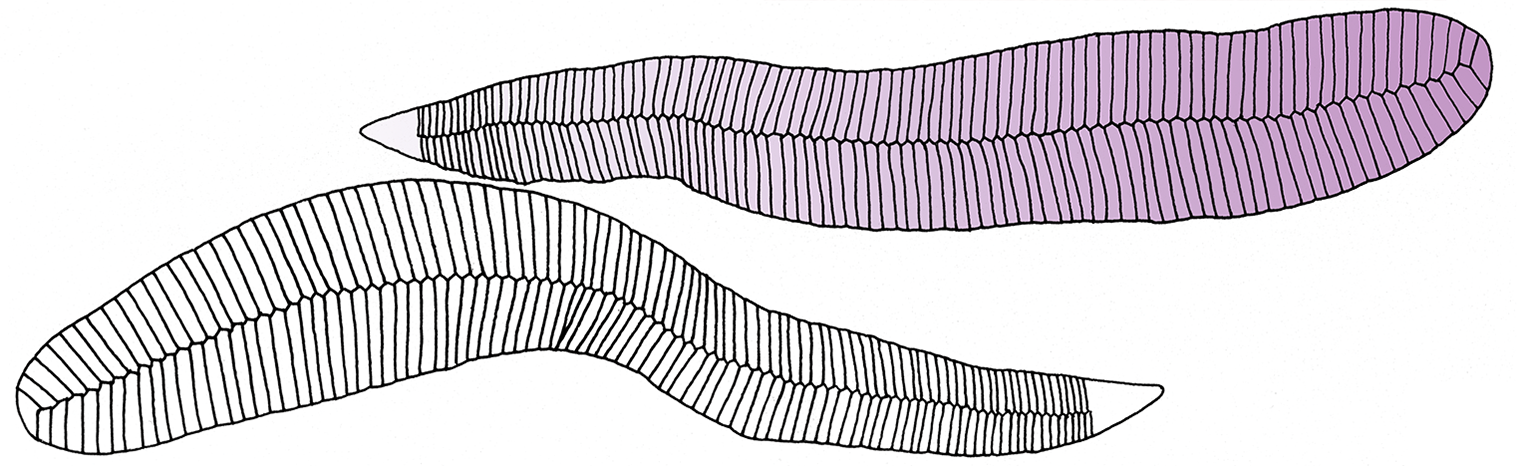
Anatomical reconstructions of two Phyllozoon hanseni specimens, showcasing their leaf-like morphology.

Phyllozoon hanseni is a elongated frondose organism, getting up to 23–26 cm (9.1–10.2 in) long, and 5.5 cm (2.2 in) and wide They have a visible medial line, featuring the classic zig-zag seen in other petalonamae genera due to the glide symmetry of the branches. These branches range from 75 to 100 on either side, numbering at 150 to 200 branches overall in any given specimen, which have a spacing of 2–3 mm (0.1–0.1 in) between each branch, with each branch getting up to 5 mm (0.2 in) in width.

Phyllozoon has been suggested to live below the matground, but recent interpretations see it on top of the matrgound, although remaining recumbent, and not upright as was originally thought. There is no evidence of a holdfast, stolon, or rachis being found with or alongside Phyllozoon. Instead it was notably rounded at the proximal end, with new branches being added from this point, slowly thinning out to form a pointed distal end.

== Affinities ==
When described, it was originally compared to Pteridinium, a genus of erniettomorph also known from the Rawnsley Quartzite, as well as other formations across the globe. Although it was noted that it differs from Pteridinium, due to only having two sides and not three, and the branches being inclined in Phyllozoon and not in Pteridinium.

In 1991, Phyllozoon, alongside Pteridinium, was used to figure out the phylogeny of what was then termed the Vendozoa, later Vendobionta, although were noted to have much a much simpler construction when compared to other frondose organisms, like Charniodiscus.

This was upheld until 2007, when Gregory Retallack, a palaeontologist most well known specialising in paleopedology, interpreted Phyllozoon as a "window lichen", which he has continued to uphold numerous times, although a multitude of other researchers have discounted or outright rejected this interpretation. This first happened in 2011, when Phyllozoon was interpreted as a feeding trace of a proarticulate organism, though what the maker would have been was unknown. This interpretation was based on Aulozoon, which has been commonly found intertwined with Phyllozoon, as a body fossil, due to it passing over and sometimes through Phyllozoon. Alongside this it was also noted that the branching seen within some specimens may be the overlaying of multiple feeding traces.

Then in 2015, the feeding trace and "window lichen" interpretions where contested, with Phyllozoon being interpreted again as a petalonamid vendiobont, and was noted to live below the matground. Then, a few years later in 2021, Phyllozoon was then further assigned to the class Erniettomorpha, with the "window lichen" interpretation being completely rejected, and feeding trace interpretation also made implausible due to new fossil material. A mode of life on top of the matground was also more preferred, being inferred from other erniettomorphs, which are always found growing above the matground. A later study done in 2024 noted that the Erniettomorpha affinity may be tentative at best, due to the inherent simplicity of Phylozoon.

== Distribution ==
Phyllozoon is primarily known from the Rawnsley Quartzite in Australia, but specimens have also been found in Newfoundland and Labrador, Canada, in what is known as the Inner Meadow site.

== See also ==
- List of Ediacaran genera
