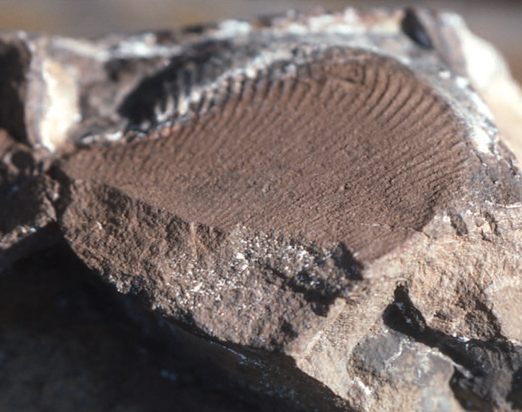
- The paratype fossil of Nasepia altae.

Scientific classification
- Kingdom: Animalia
- Phylum: †Petalonamae
- Class: †Erniettomorpha
- Genus: †Nasepia; Germs, 1973
- Species: †N. altae

Binomial name
- †Nasepia altae Germs, 1973

= Nasepia =

Nasepia Temporal range: late Ediacaran ~545–540 Ma

Extinct animal of class Erniettomorpha

Nasepia is an extinct organism from the late Ediacaran of Namibia, and was alive around 545 – 540 Ma. Noted to have a leaf-like body, it is a part of the Erniettomorpha class. It is a monotypic genus, containing only Nasepia altae.

Recent studies done in Nasepia's type locality have, through new fossil material, inferred that Swartpuntia, another erniettomorph, may either be more closely related to, or a junior synonym of Nasepia.

== Discovery and naming ==
Fossil material of Nasepia was found in the Nasep Quartzite and Huns Limestone Members of the Urusis Formation in Nambia, Africa in 1968, and was formally described and named in 1973.

The generic name Nasepia derives from the place name "Nasep Quartzite Member", from which the first fossils were found. The specific name altae is in honour of Alta Germs, the wife of Gerard Germs, the author of the description paper.

== Description ==
Nasepia altae is a small, leaf-like fossil composed of a series of tubular modules, all set in one direction and subparallel to the long axis, with the occasional transverse set of modules occurring also. Each module ranges between 0.1–1 mm (0–0 in) in width, with the widest Nasepia petaloid coming in at 10.5 cm (4 in) in overall width.

Due to the poor preservation of most fossils, and their broken nature also, a full reconstruction of the organism is noted to be impossible to make. Despite this, it is noted to differ from other petalonamids such as Rangea and Pteridinium in that its petaloid is smaller than both, and the general construction of the tubular modules is different, with them being subparallel to the long axis, whilst on Pteridinium and Rangea they are at a much greater angle.

== Affinites ==
Due to the poor preservation of Nasepia, for some time it was tentatively assigned to the phylum Petalonamae, although later studies would accept this placement, as well as placing it within the family Erniettomorpha.

One study done by Runnegar et al. (2024) noted that through the discovery of material at type locality of Nasepia, referred to as the "Arimas lycopod", bore similarities to the axis of Swartpuntia, another erniettomorph. From this, the researchers inferred that this either meant that Swartpuntia could possibly be a junior synonym of Nasepia, or closely related to Nasepia. Although, it was noted in the original description paper of Swartpuntia that Nasepia is considerably smaller than it, and that currently Nasepia bears no central axis. Alongside this, the poor preservation of Nasepia's fossils also hinders things, seeing it suggested to be a junior synonym of Pteridinium in one paper, and regarded as incertae sedis in another due this. Another probable relation was put forward by Hoffman (1987), this time noting that Chondroplon could potentially be a "Pteridinium-like" organism, similar to Pteridinium and Nasepia. Hoffman quickly discounted any relation of Pteridinium, but noted that Chondroplon bore more similarities to Nasepia, although due to the aforementioned incomplete nature of the fossils, this was only left as an open-ended possibility.

== See also ==
- List of Ediacaran genera
- Erniettomorpha
