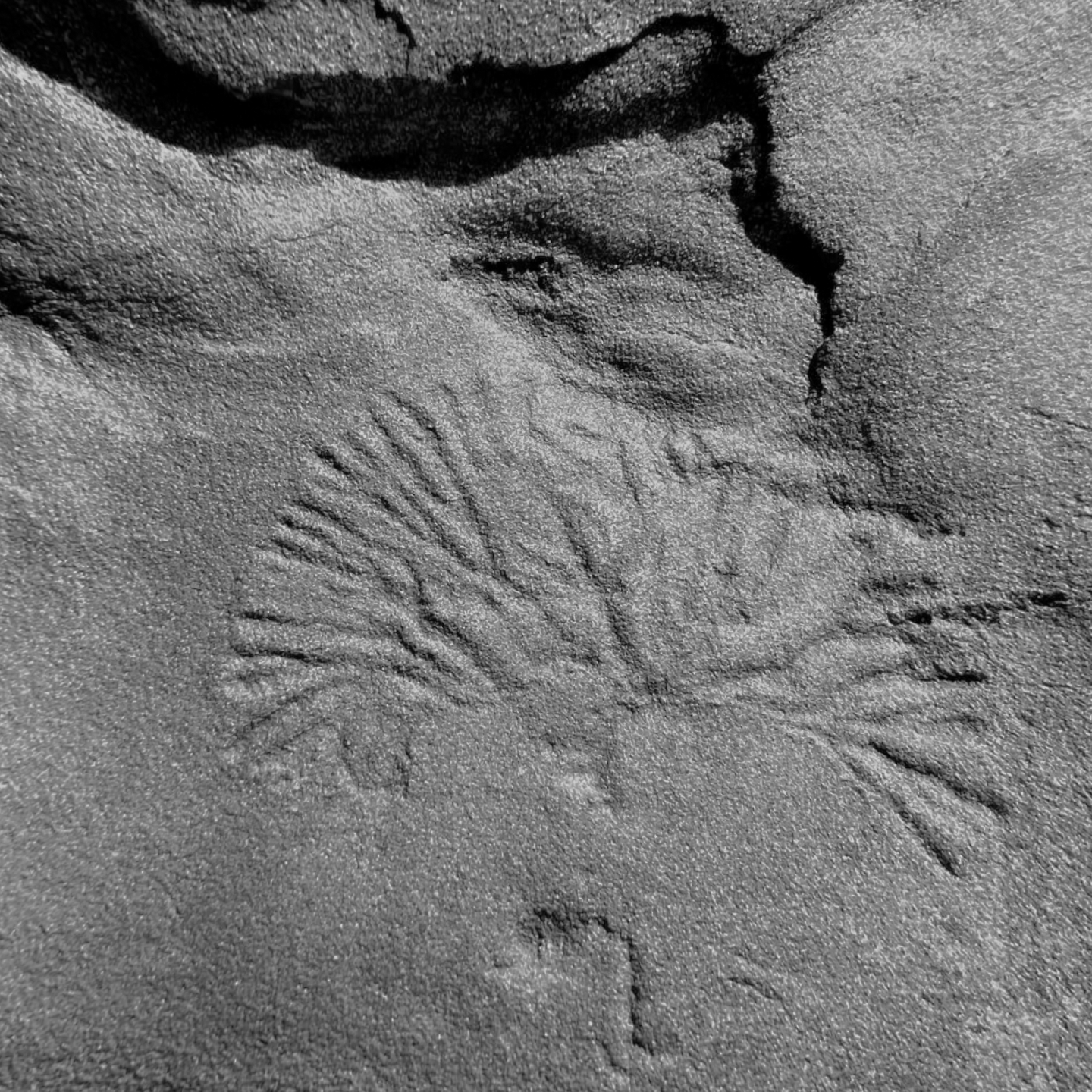
- Fossil of Nilpenia rossi

Scientific classification
- Kingdom: Animalia (?)
- Genus: †Nilpenia; Droser et al., 2014
- Species: †N. rossi

Binomial name
- †Nilpenia rossi Droser et al., 2014

= Nilpenia =

Nilpenia Temporal range: late Ediacaran ~555 Ma

Extinct species of sediment-feeder

Nilpenia is an extinct enigmatic organism from the late Ediacaran of Australia. It is interpreted as a benthic sediment-feeder, and is also a monotypic genus, containing only Nilpenia rossi.

== Discovery and naming ==
The holotype fossil of Nilpenia was found from the Ediacara Member of the Rawnsley Quartzite, in Nilpena Ediacara National Park, Flinders Ranges of South Australia in 2013, and was formally described and named in 2014, although other specimens were known from 1995, but attributed to different trace fossils.

The generic name Nilpenia is in honour of the Nilpena Ediacara National Park, the locality from which the organism was first found. The specific name rossi is in honour of Ross Fargher, due to his commitment to helping converse the fossils within the Nilpena Ediacara National Park.

== Description ==
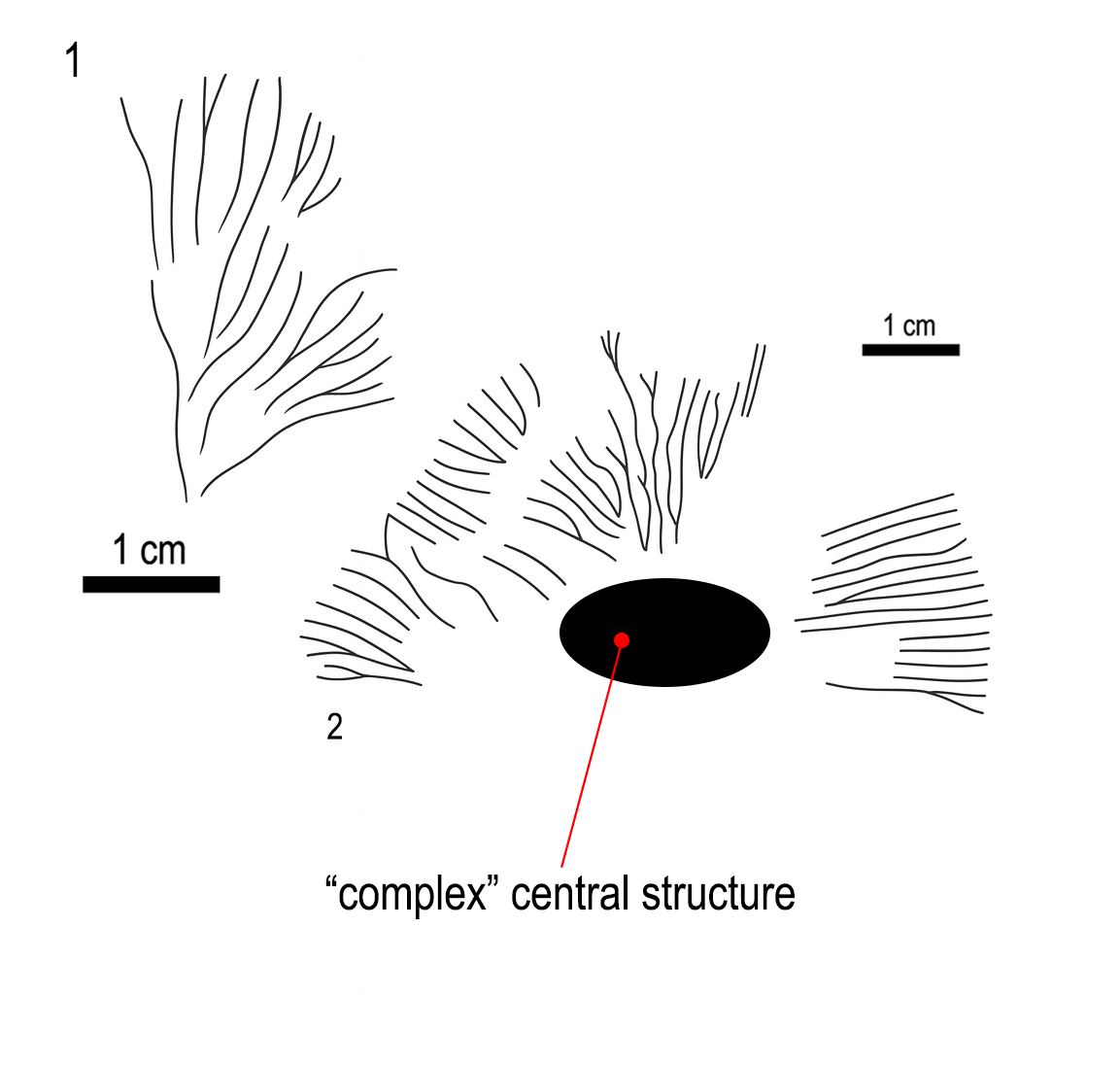
A simple line drawing displaying size difference between 2 N. rossi specimens.

Nilpenia rossi is a branching fan-shaped organism, ranging from 8–280 mm (0.3–11.0 in) in diameter. The branching structures are preserved as grooves in the rock, getting up to 2 mm (0.1 in) in width and radiating from the very centre of the organism, all of which then terminate at a raised rim in specimens larger than 40 mm (1.6 in) in diameter. These grooves feature random dichotomous branching whilst not crossing over and other grooves, and in larger specimens begin to decrease in width further from the centre they get. It is also noted that in the most mature, and larger specimens, the branching completely covers the substrate in a fan or circle around the centre. Specimens larger than 30 mm (1.2 in) in diameter have a distinct central portion, consisting of more densely packed diamond shaped ridges, and is known to get up to half the diameter of the larger specimens.

This unique morphology and way of growth has made any proper taxonomic placement difficult, as it has been noted that there is nothing like this around today, with the closest analogues being encrusting organisms such as bryozoans, sponges and cnidarians, although even the basic morphologies do not match up entirely with Nilpenia.

== Taphonomy ==
Nilpenia is commonly preserved in two modes in a single fossil. In specimens with a central portion, these are usually poorly preserved, and come up as positive relief, meaning it protrudes from the rock surface. Meanwhile the larger grooves in the main portion in all specimens is preserved as negative relief, meaning they are impressions on the rock surface, and are more nicely preserved. This has brought on the suggestion that Nilpenia had a varying rigidity to its body, with the larger branches being able to remain rigid enough after burial to be able to make casts of themselves, forming the grooves, whilst the smaller central portion collapsed soon after burial.

== Palaeoecology ==
Due to the way the organisms were preserved, it has been interpreted that Nilpenia lived within the upper millimeters of the sediment, opposed to views of how other organisms were mat-encrusters, which interacted within microbial mats on the seafloor. Although it has been noted that Nilpenia instead displaced sediments whilst growing, instead of boring through it, as seen in the local ichnotaxon Helminthoidichnites.

Due to its large diameter, and the near coverage of the substrate by its branching, Nilpenia is also considered to represent the largest Ediacaran organism by area.

== Distribution ==
Nilpenia is primarily known from the Rawnsley Quartzite in Australia, but has also been found in small numbers from the Lomoziv Beds of the Mogyliv Formation in Ukraine.

== See also ==
- List of Ediacaran genera
