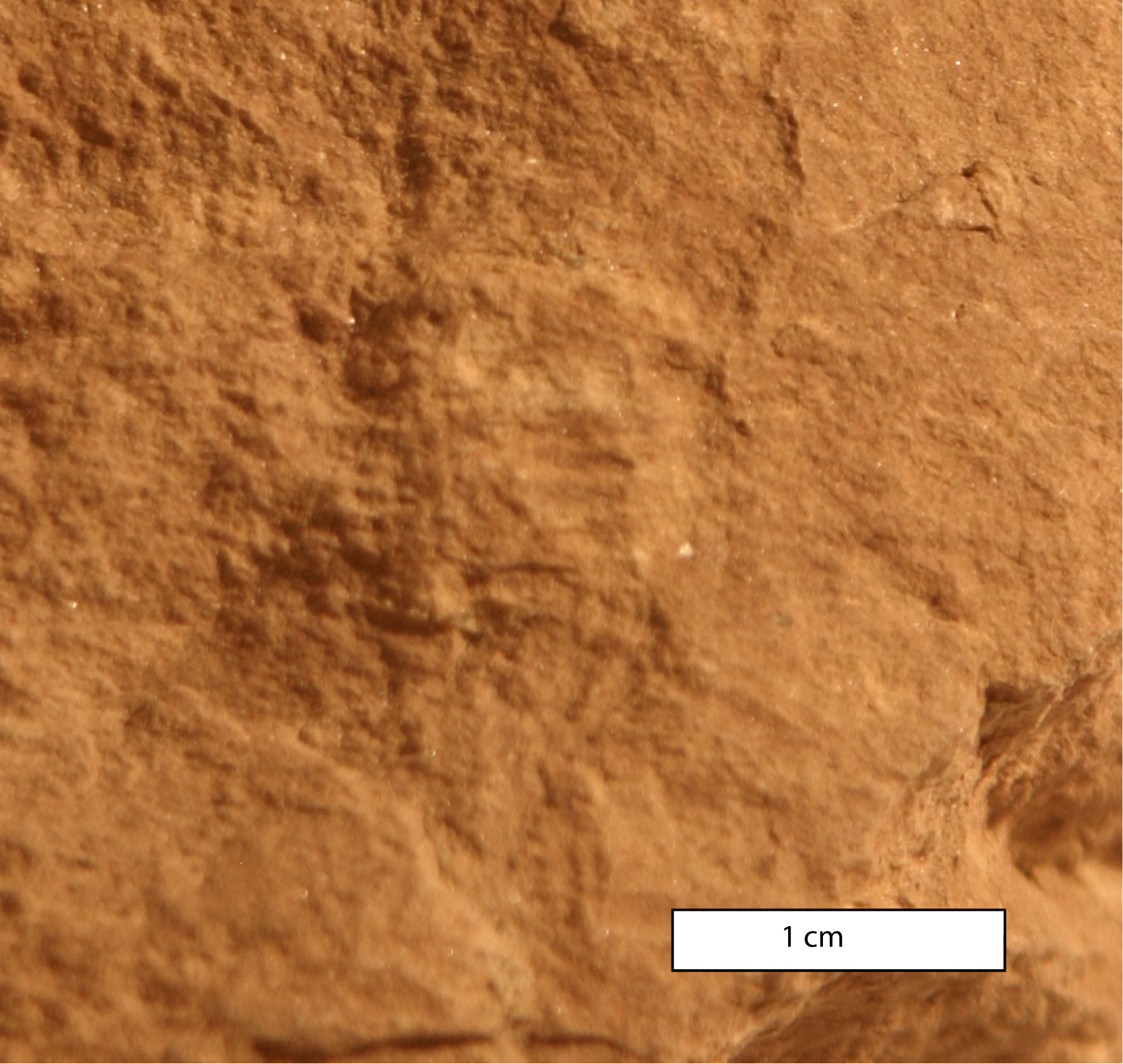
- Crack-out specimen of Erytholus globosus from the Middle Cambrian, Moodlatana Formation, of the Flinders ranges, South Australia

Scientific classification
- Domain: Incertae sedis
- Genus: †Erytholus; Retallack 2011

Species
- Erytholus globosus

= Erytholus =

Erytholus Temporal range: Middle Cambrian

Form genus for problematic fossils of Cambrian age in South Australia

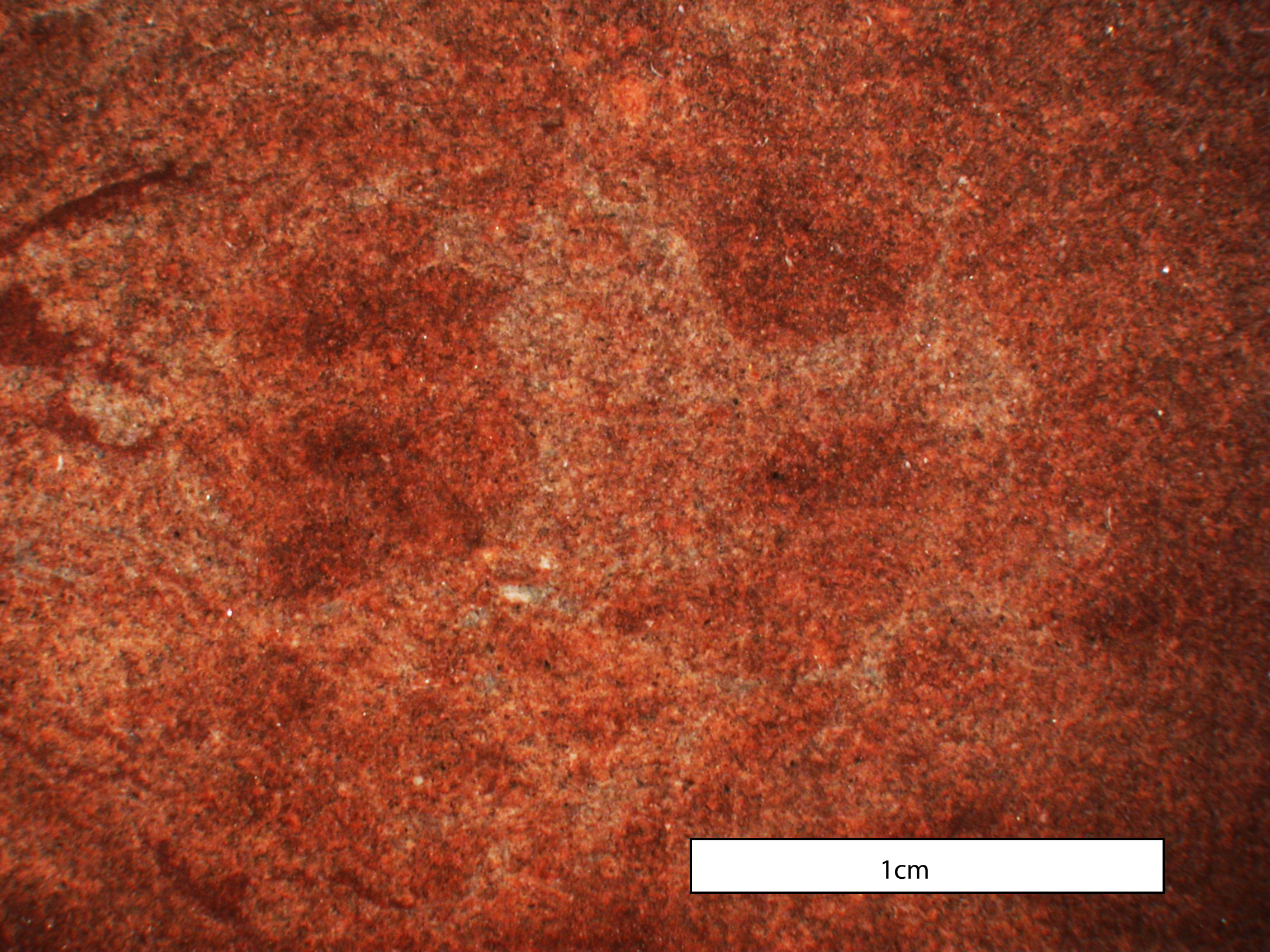
Specimen of Eryhtolus globosus in sandstone slab cut vertical to bedding

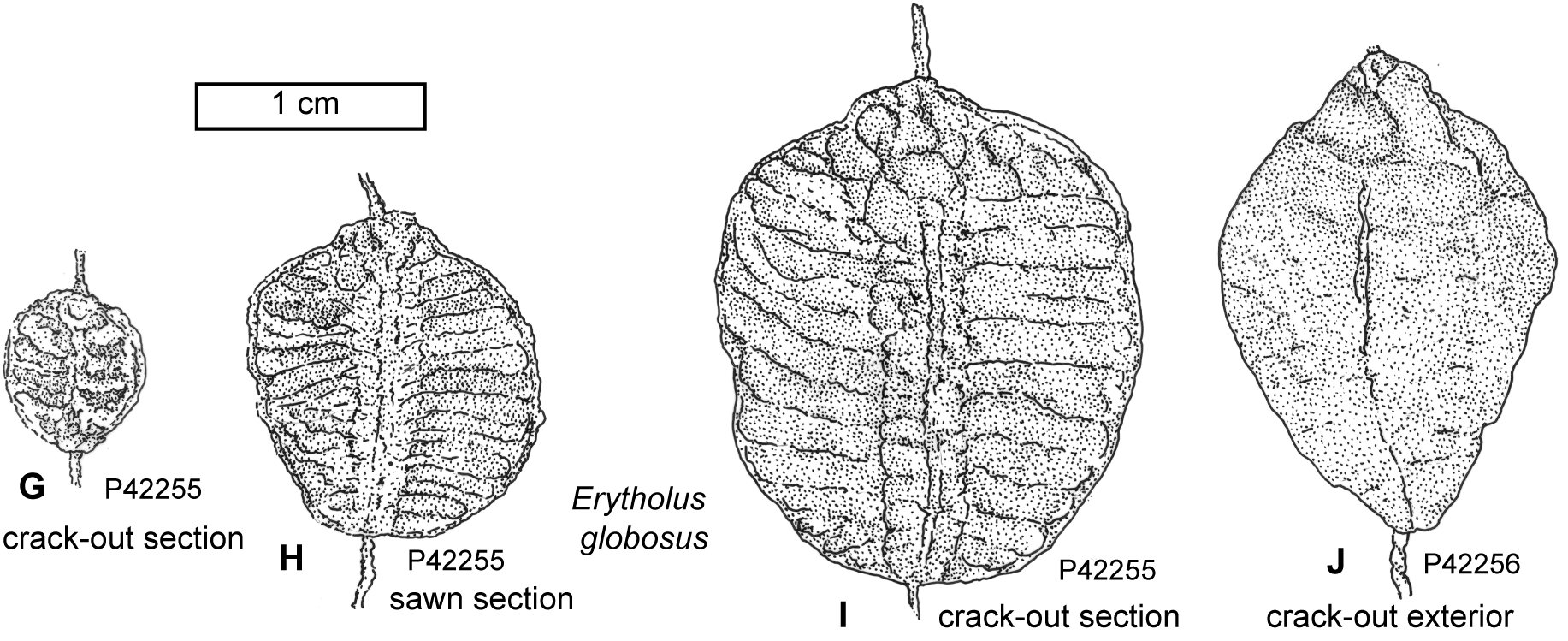
Sketches of specimens of Erytholus globosus from the Middle Cambrian, Moodlatana Formation of the Flinders Ranges, South Australia

Erytholus is a form genus for problematic alleged fossils of Cambrian age in South Australia. It has been of special interest because of its morphological similarity with the Ediacaran fossil Ventogyrus, and may have been a late surviving vendobiont. It could be a slime mold. Other authors have doubted whether it represents a fossil

== Description ==
Erytholus was claimed by its describer, Gregory Retallack, to be a globose, chambered fossil, with associated vertical tubular structures. Retallack considered its preservation in sandstone is similar to the Ediacaran type preservation of the vendobiont Ventogyrus. It is found at depths of 20–30 centimetres (7.9–11.8 in) within paleosols. Its affinities are uncertain, although it bears a general resemblance to truffles. In a rebuttal published in 2011, four other authors contested the idea that Erytholus was a fossil at all, stating that it was likely merely a "broken section of a poorly sorted ferruginous, muddy sandstone with deformed laminae".
