= Albemarle Group =

- Stratigraphic range: Ediacaran
- Type: Group
- Sub-units: Cid Formation, Floyd Church Formation, Tillery Formation, Yadkin Formation

Location
- Region: North Carolina
- Country: United States

Type section
- Named for: Albemarle, NC

The Albemarle Group is a geologic group in North Carolina composed of metamorphosed mafic and felsic volcanic rock, sandstone, siltstone, shale, and mudstone. It is considered part of the Carolina Slate Belt and covers several counties in central North Carolina. It preserves fossils dating back to the Ediacaran period in the Floyd Church member.

== Description ==
All five members of the Albemarle Group are composed of metamorphosed volcanic and sedimentary rocks. The Albemarle Group covers parts of Anson, Davidson, Carbarrus, Montgomery, Randolph, Rowan, Stanly, and Union counties. It is part of the Carolina Slate Belt, which is characterized by metamorphic volcanic rich sedimentary rocks. The Albemarle Group falls in the Piedmont region of North Carolina.

=== History ===
Formations have been added, removed, and renamed several times since the Ablemarle Group was first proposed. The first three members were, from oldest to youngest, the Tillery Formation, the McManus Formation, and the Yadkin Greywacke. The McManus Formation name was abandoned, and the Cid Formation was proposed with two members: the Flat Swamp member and an unnamed mudstone member. Parts of the McManus Formation became the Millingport Formation with two members: the Yadkin Member (formerly the Yadkin Greywacke) and the Floyd Church member. Another revision abandoned the Millingport Formation name, and gave formation status to the Yadkin Formation and the Floyd Church Formation. The McManus terminology has been used by later papers, but had not been adopted by the USGS or the North Carolina Geological Survey.

== See also ==
- List of fossiliferous stratigraphic units in North Carolina
