= Namapoikia =

Namapoikia Temporal range: Late Ediacaran 548.8 Ma

Scientific classification
- Kingdom: Animalia
- Phylum: Porifera (?)
- Genus: †Namapoikia; Wood et al. 2002
- Species: †N. rietoogensis

Binomial name
- †Namapoikia rietoogensis Wood et al. 2002

Extinct genus of possible sponges

Namapoikia is an extinct enigmatic organism from the late Ediacaran of Namibia. Its affinites have been long disputed since its formal description, with it being classified as either a coral-like organism, a sponge-like organism, or a microbial colony, similar to thrombolites. It is a monotypic genus, containing only Namapoikia rietoogensis.

== Discovery ==
The first fossils of Namapoikia were found in the Omkyk Member of the Zaris Formation, in the Nama Group of southern Namibia, and described in 2002.

== Description ==
Namapoikia rietoogensis is a wide, flat dome-like organism, with the largest specimens reaching up to 1 m (3 ft 3.4 in) in diameter and 25 cm (9.8 in) in height. The body itself is formed of a calcareous skeleton, which is modular in nature and is composed of multiple tubules, which range from 0.5–3.5 mm (0.0–0.1 in) in diameter, a most likely grew by longitudinal fission. This is inferred by growth annulae occurring every 0.5–2.5 mm (0.0–0.1 in). Skeletal filling tissue is completely absent from all known fossil specimens, although it is noted there are incomplete structures that resemble tabulae, which are horizontal plates. Small holdfast structures have also been found in specimens that are associated with mat-ground, which get up to 2 mm (0.1 in) in diameter, and are buld-like in shape.

== Palaeoecology ==
Namapoikia is an encrusting benthic organism, with fossil specimens most commonly found within fissures that formed within stromatolite–thrombolite bioherms within a larger reef complex, partially or completely filling in the fissures themselves. Some specimens of Nampoikia also show that after some time, they would then be encrusted by stromatolites themselves. It is also noted that Namapoikia would have had a strong preference for much firmer substrates, which were also mostly sediment-free, like thrombolites, and was most likely colonial in nature.

Alongside this, Namapoikia also represents the earliest calcareous organism, with later studies noting that the original composition of the skeleton was of aragonite, which would have allowed it to have an advantage against possible competitors, as well as protection against any would be predators. Further studies also noted that Namapoikia may have started out with a soft organic scaffolding, in which the skeleton would have rapidly grown around to form the calcareous body, with the organic parts also becoming calcified over time.

== Affinities ==
When described, Namapoikia was compared to coralomorphs, especially those found within the lower Cambrian, such as the Siberian coralomorph Yaworipora, the encrusting Labyrinthus, and Rosellatana from North America. All genera share a similar way of growth, consisting of thick-walled polygonal tubes, getting up to 5 mm (0.2 in) in diameter, and lacking tabulae. It was also noted that by bear similarities to the chaetetid sponges, although the tube diameter of Namapoikia exceeds what is currently known in chaetetid sponges. Recent studies have noted that they may in fact be more closely related to sponges and to cnidarians, showing similarities to the extant acanthochaetetids, and extinct Blastochaetetes.

There have also been some studies have stated that more is needed to confirm the sponge affinity, as currently there are no known specimens that have spicules preserved in them, with some entirely discounting any affinities with animals, by making three-dimensional reconstructions of known specimens to further study the morphology, finding there are no tabulae, large sheet-like partitions, and no sponge structures such as lack of any ostias, suggesting they may be microbial in origin. However, subsequent studies have not taken note of this, continuing to tentatively refer to Namapoikia as a sponge.

== See also ==
- Ediacaran biota
- Namacalathus
- Cloudina
- List of Ediacaran genera
