= Velocephalina =

Velocephalina Temporal range: Late Ediacaran 555 Ma

Scientific classification
- Kingdom: Animalia
- Genus: †Velocephalina; Coutts et al., 2019
- Species: †V. greenwoodensis

Binomial name
- †Velocephalina greenwoodensis Coutts et al., 2019

Extinct mollusc-like genus from the Ediacaran

Velocephalina is a nomen ineditum, meaning it was not properly published, being named exclusively in a PhD thesis. Within this thesis, it is noted as being a genus of Ediacaran biota, known only from the Flinders Ranges, South Australia. It is a bilaterian organism, vaguely resembling Kimberella, and is also a monotpyic genus, containing only Velocephalina greenwoodensis.

== Discovery ==
The fossil material of Velocephalina was found in the Ediacara Member of the Rawnsley Quartzite, in Nilpena Ediacara National Park, Flinders Ranges of South Australia in 2016 and informally referred to as "Form 1", and was described and named in 2019.

== Etymology ==
The generic name Velocephalina derives from the Greek word velos, to mean "arrow"; and the cephalos, to mean "head", in reference to the appearance of the anterior of the body. The specific name greenwoodensis derives from the place name Greenwood Cliff, near to where the fossil material was found.

== Description ==
Velocephalina is a small, oval organism, growing up to 17.6 mm (0.7 in) in length. Similar to Kimberella, its margin is fringed by frilly section, although the similarities end there. There is an arrowhead shaped extension at the front of the body, getting up to 7.2 mm (0.3 in) in length, and also features a frill on either side, as well as a medial groove at its very front. ending halfway along. At the near of the organism, there is also a distinctive "flange", made up of four longitudinal grooves.

== See also ==
- List of Ediacaran genera
