= Cid Formation =

Geologic formation in North Carolina, United States

- Stratigraphic range: Ediacaran
- Type: Formation
- Unit of: Albemarle Group
- Sub-units: Flat Swamp member, mudstone member

Lithology
- Primary: metavolcanic rock, shale, argillite
- Other: mudstone

Location
- Region: North Carolina
- Country: United States

Type section
- Named for: Cid, NC

The Cid Formation is a metavolcanic rock and mudstone geologic formation in North Carolina. It consists of a lower unnamed mudstone member with intermittent volcanic flows and the Flat Swamp Member, which is characterized by pyroclastic flows. It preserves fossils dating back to the Ediacaran period.

== See also ==
- List of fossiliferous stratigraphic units in North Carolina
