= Cid, North Carolina =

- Unincorporated community
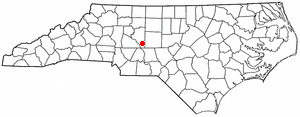
- Location of Cid, North Carolina
- Coordinates: 35.712°N 80.106°W
- Country: United States
- State: North Carolina
- County: Davidson
- Elevation: 748 ft (228 m)
- Time zone: UTC-5 (Eastern (EST))
  - Summer (DST): UTC-4 (EDT)
- Area code: 336
- GNIS feature ID: 1002030

Cid is a populated place in Davidson County, North Carolina, United States.

== Geography ==
Cid is located at latitude 35.712 and longitude -80.106. The elevation is 748 feet.
