= Nama Group =

- Stratigraphic range: Ediacaran; ~570–543 Ma
- Type: Group
- Unit of: Nama Basin
- Sub-units: See text
- Underlies: Table Mountain Sandstone
- Overlies: Basement
- Area: 125,000 km^{2} (48,000 sq mi)

Lithology
- Primary: Sandstone
- Other: Siltstone, mudstone, limestone

Location
- Coordinates: 23.9°S 16.7°E
- Approximate paleocoordinates: 41.4°S 179.2°W
- Region: Omaheke, Hardap & ǁKaras Regions
- Country: Namibia
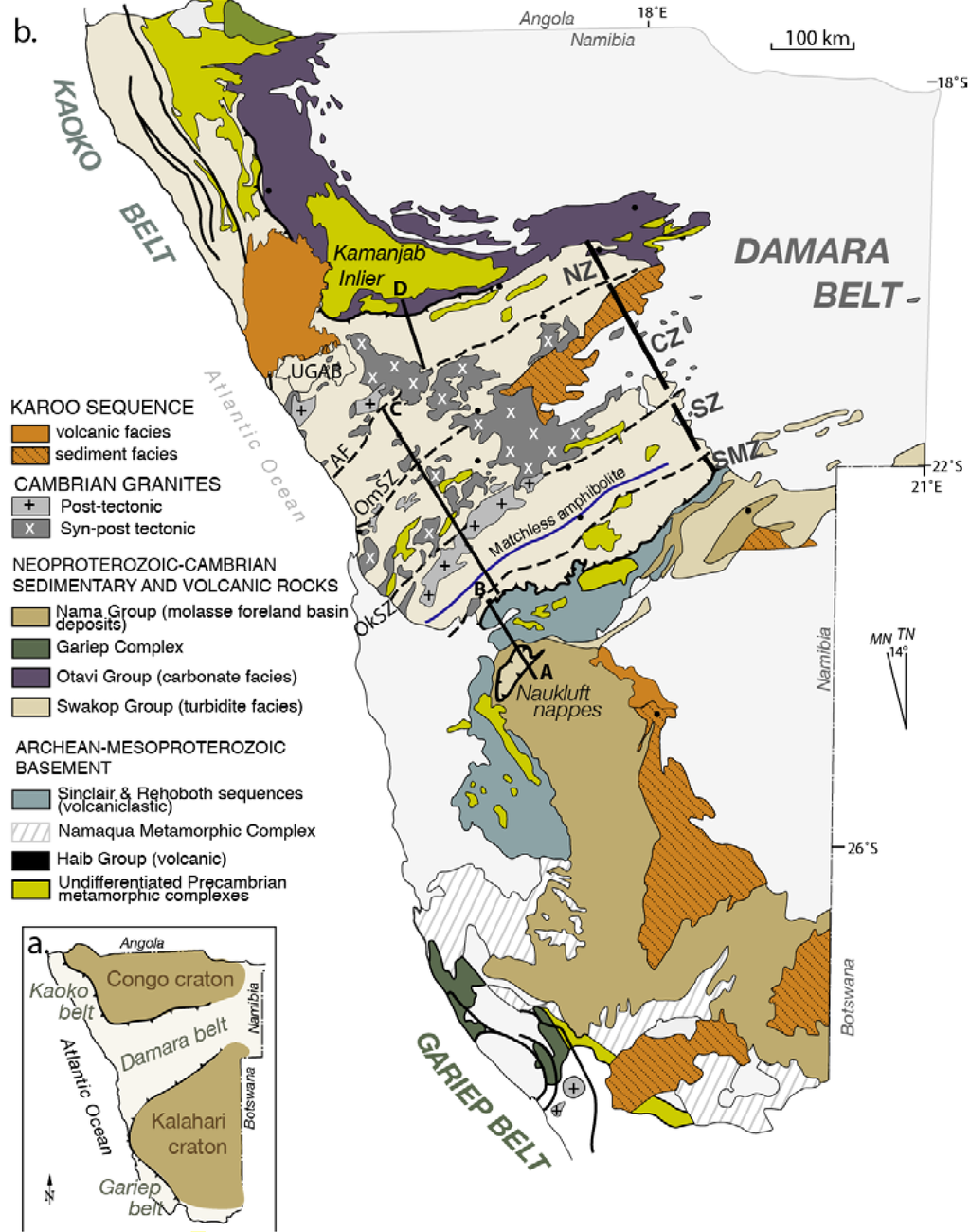
- Geologic map of Namibia with the Nama Group in beige

The Nama Group is a 125,000 square kilometres (48,000 sq mi) megaregional Ediacaran group of stratigraphic sequences deposited in the Nama foreland basin in central and southern Namibia. The Nama Basin is a peripheral foreland basin, and the Nama Group was deposited in two early basins, the Zaris and Witputs, to the north, while the South African Vanrhynsdorp Group was deposited in the southern third. The Nama Group is made of fluvial and shallow-water marine sediments, both siliciclastic and carbonate. La Tinta Group in Argentina is considered equivalent to Nama Group.

== Description ==
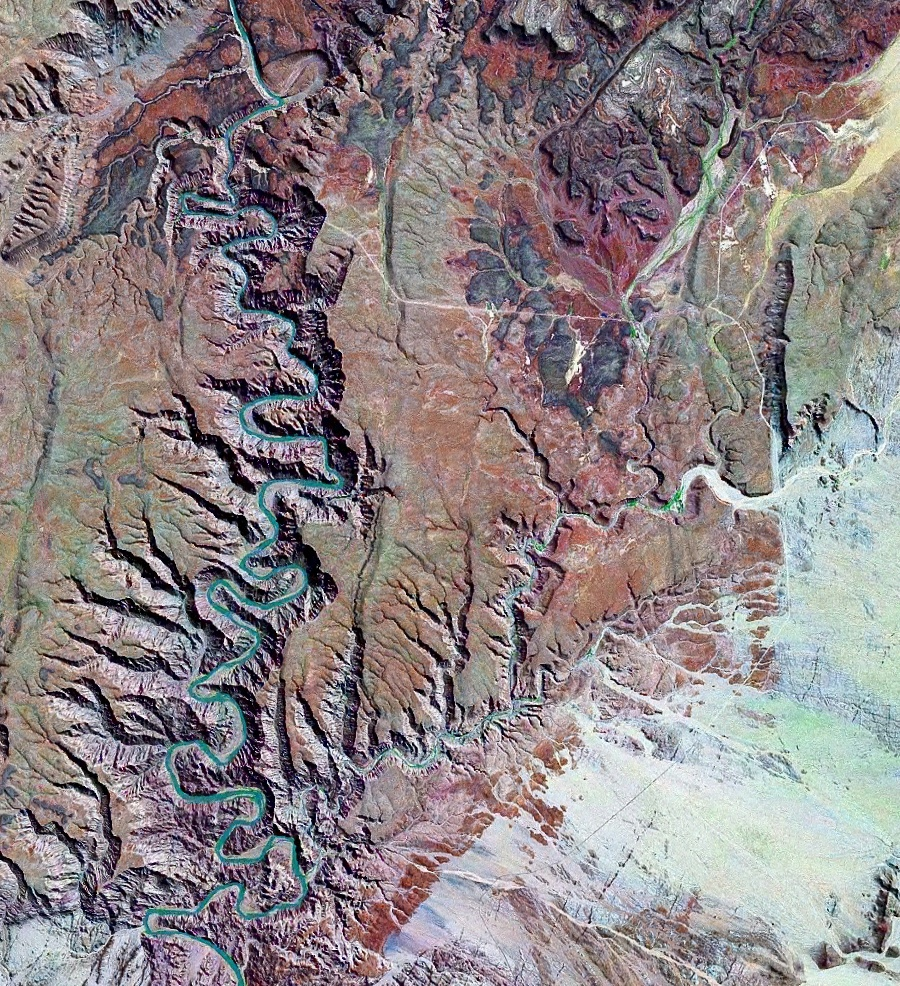
Fish River Canyon and Huns Mountains, where the Nama Group crops out

The group extends from the Gariep Belt in the south to outcrops of pre-Damara basement in the north. Thrombolite-stromatolite reefs in the Nama Group are best developed in the Kuibis Subgroup of the Zaris subbasin, and in the Huns platform of the Witputs subbasin. The Nama Group is a series of interbedded shallow marine carbonates and siliciclastics deposited in a storm-dominated ramp setting.

"Nama-type preservation" is an Ediacaran type preservation that presents sandstone castings of fossil creatures in which organisms are preserved in three dimensions, within fine-grained beds that were deposited in single storm or mudflow events: an example is Ausia fenestrata. Analysis performed in 2018 on Namacalathus and Cloudina skeletons from the Ediacaran Omkyk Member of the Nama Group demonstrates that both organisms originally produced aragonitic skeletons, which later underwent diagenetic conversion to calcite.

== Stratigraphy ==
The Nama Group is subdivided into:

Subgroup	Formation	Member
Fish River		
Schwarzrand	Vergesig Formation	
Schwarzrand	Nomtsas Formation	
Schwarzrand	Urusis Formation	Spitskop
Schwarzrand	Naldaus/Nudaus Formation	Huns
Schwarzrand	Naldaus/Nudaus Formation	Niederhagen
Kuibis	Zaris Formation	Urikos & Hoogland
Kuibis	Zaris Formation	Omkyk
Kuibis	Dabis Formation	Kliphoek
Kuibis	Dabis Formation	Kanies

== Ages ==
The lower and upper part of the Spitskop Member of the Urusis Formation, Schwarzrand Subgroup, had originally been dated on the basis of zircons to 545.1 ± 1 Ma and 543.3 ± 1 Ma respectively. Recalibration of the Spitskop radiometric data indicates revised dates of 542.68 ± 1.25 Ma (terminal Ediacaran) and 540.61 ± 0.67 Ma (within error of the Ediacaran–Cambrian boundary), respectively. An ash bed from the Hoogland Member towards the base of the Nama Group (Zaris Formation, Kuibus Subgroup) has yielded an age of 547.4 ± 0.3 Ma, in 2018 slightly modified to 547.32 ± 0.31 Ma. The lower part of the Nomtsas Formation has yielded an age of 539.4 ± 1 Ma, in the same year recalibrated to 538.18 ± 1.11 Ma.

== Fossil content ==
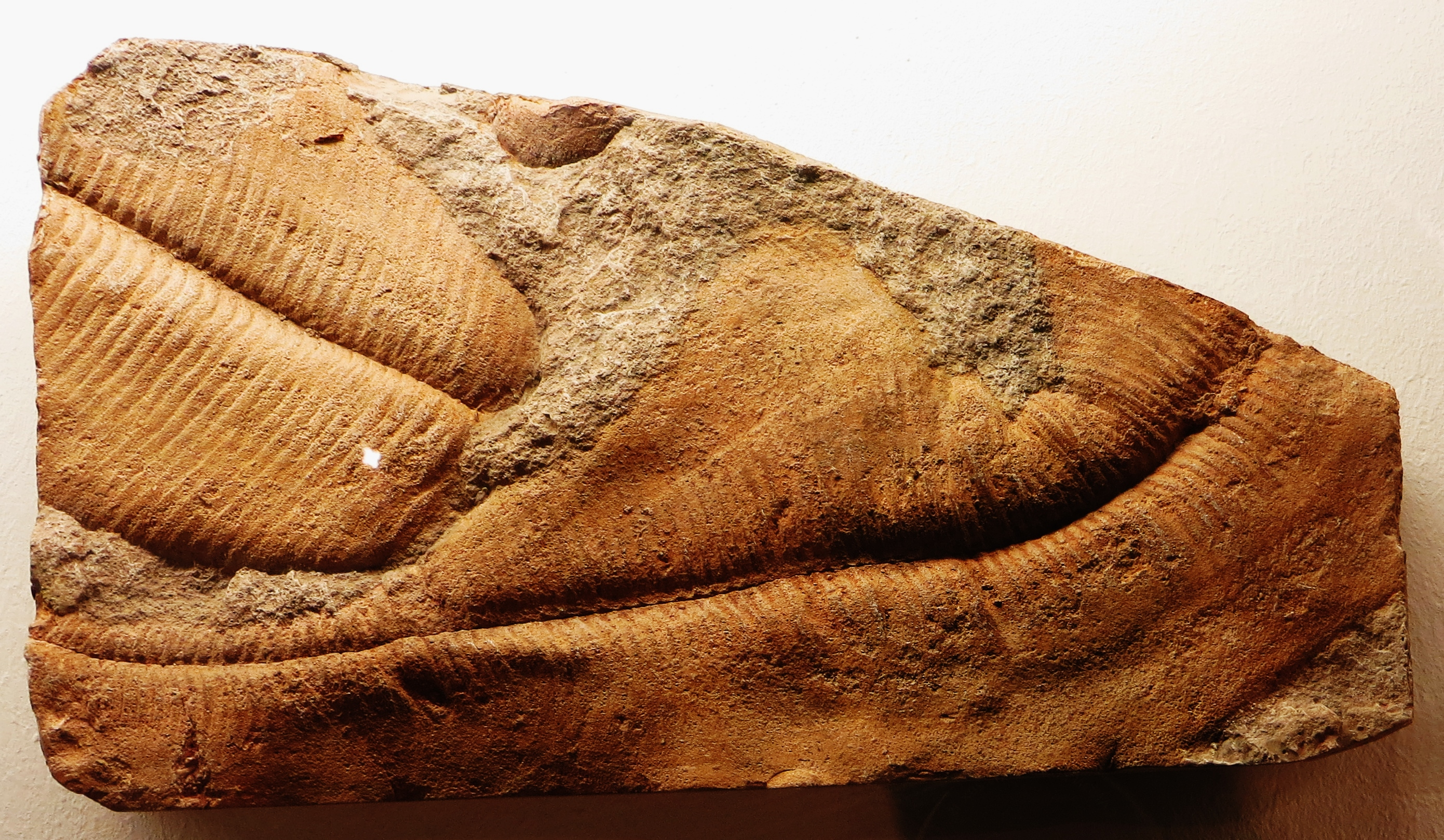
Fossil of Pteridinium simplex from the Nama Group

Nama-type Ediacaran fossils found in the group include:

- Ausia fenestrata
- Bergaueria - Kuibis Subgroup
- Brooksella - Schwarzrand Subgroup
- ?Chondrites - Schwarzrand Subgroup
- Cloudina - Zaris Formation
- ?Diplichnites - Nomtsas Formation
- Neonereites biserialis, N. uniserialis - Nomtsas Formation
- Diplocraterion - Schwarzrand Subgroup
- Enigmatichnus africani - Fish River Subgroup
- Ernietta - Naldaus & Dabis Formations
- Namacalathus hermanastes - Zaris Formation
- Namalia villiersiensis - Kuibis Quartzite
- Namapoikia rietoogensis - Dabis Formation
- Nereites - Schwarzrand Subgroup
- Protechiurus edmondsi - Kuibis Quartzite & Dabis Formation
- Pteridinium carolinaense, P. simplex - Naldaus & Dabis Formations
- Rangea schneiderhoehni - Naldaus & Dabis Formations
- Skolithos - Fish River & Schwarzrand Subgroups
- Streptichnus narbonnei - Urusis Formation
- Swartpuntia germsi - Urusis Formation
- Treptichnus pedum - Nomtsas Formation

== Gallery ==
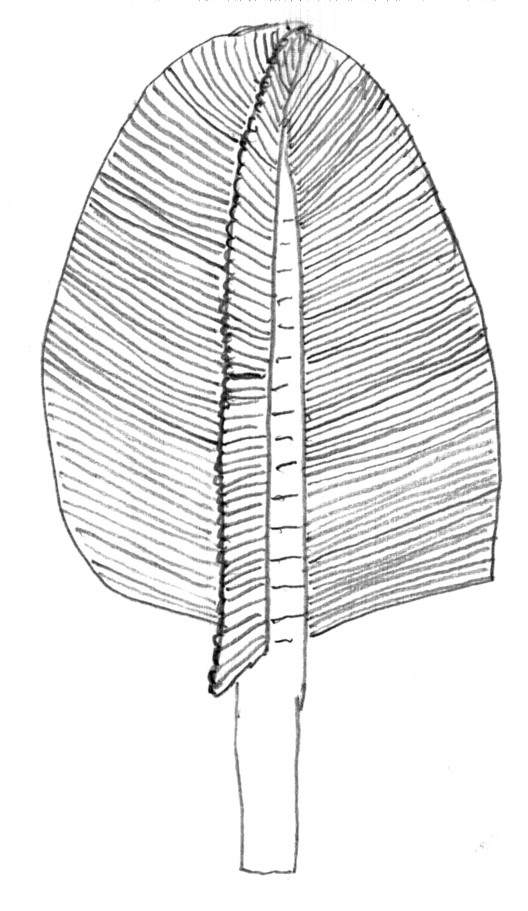
Reconstruction of Swartpuntia germsi

Reconstruction of Namacalathus hermanastes

Reconstruction of Cloudina

== See also ==
- List of fossiliferous stratigraphic units in Namibia
- Geology of Namibia
- Puncoviscana Formation
- Sierra Bayas Group
