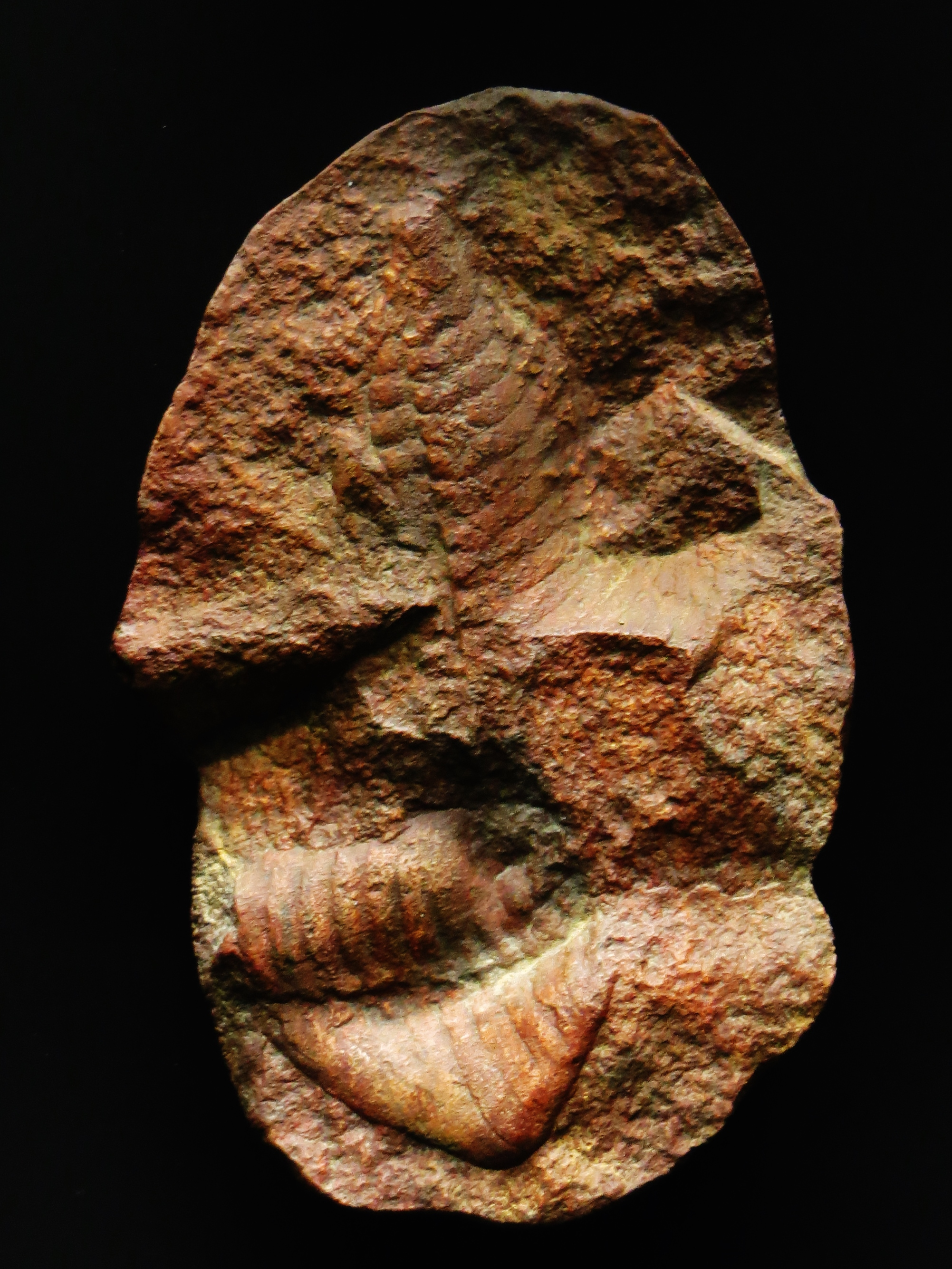
- Fossil of Pteridinium simplex at the Senckenberg Museum, Frankfurt.

Scientific classification
- Kingdom: Animalia
- Phylum: †Petalonamae
- Class: †Erniettomorpha
- Family: †Pteridinidae
- Genus: †Pteridinium; Gürich, 1933

Type species
- † Pteridinium simplex Gürich, 1930

Species
- P. simplex (Gürich, 1930); P. carolinaensis (St. Jean, 1973)

Synonyms
- Pteridium Gürich, 1930 (nomen nudum); Onegia Sokolov, 1976 (nomen nudum); Inkrylovia Fedonkin, 1979

= Pteridinium =

Pteridinium Temporal range: late Ediacaran ~567.3–543 Ma

Ediacaran fossil

Pteridinium is an extinct organism from the later Ediacaran of Africa, Asia, and North America, and was live around 567.3 – 543 Ma. It is a part of the Erniettomorpha class, and is composed of three vanes, or petaloids, in a canoe-like shape.

== Discovery and history ==
The holotype and paratype fossils of Pteridinium were found in the Kliphoek Member of the Dabis Formation in Namibia, Africa. It would be formally described and named Pteridium simplex in 1930, but the name had already been in use since 1777 by Scopoli as the generic name for bracken fern, seeing the generic name for Pteridium changed to Pteridinium in 1933.

The original 1930 holotype and paratype fossils found and described by Georg Gürich were lost during World War II. As such, in 1955 the German paleontologist Rudolf Richter would nominate a neotype for Pteridinium, which is noted to most likely come from the Kuibis Formation. Two new specimens of Pteridinium would be found in the Floyd Church Formation in North Carolina in 1963 by John Brattain, a high school student. These would shown to Joseph St. Jean from the UNC Geology Department, who would misidentify them as Cambrian trilobites, placing them under the genus Paradoxides as ?Paradoxides carolinaensis in 1973. It would be later found out that these were actually Pteridinium fossils, and were accordingly moved to the genus as Pteridinium carolinaensis.

== Description ==
Pteridinium is a three-vaned frondose fossil organism, composed of tubular modules, and with a canoe-like shape. The whole frond can reach up to and over 40 cm (16 in) in length, and notably does not taper or change in width along most of the frond until the distal ends. The three vanes are set lengthwise along the central axis, with the tubular modules commonly being either slightly curved or straight in nature. The modules are also a similar width along their length, and are either offset from other modules in other vanes in a zig-zag fashion, or sit directly opposite them. When preserved, the margins of the vanes are notably outlined by a differentiated, smooth edge. The outer vanes are notably curved, as such when joining the central vane, they form a W shaped cross-section.

Pteridinium is found to rarely taper at its distal ends, although in near fully complete specimens, it is noted that it can quickly taper at their one end, or both. In specimens with one tapering end, this has sometimes been inferred to be the point of growth for Pteridinium, although it is noted that this may simply be due taphonomic bias.

== Paleoecology ==
Based off of related taxa such as Ernietta, and multiple fossil specimens, it has been inferred that Pteridinium lived semi-infaunally, and commonly in large aggregated communities. The long axis of Pteridinium was also commonly found perpendicular to the palaeocurrent, with its semi-infaunal lifestyle keeping it anchored to the substrate, whilst water slowly flowing into the two cavities created by the three vanes deposited food particles and sediment. This suggested that Pteridinium was a late Ediacaran benthic suspension feeder, similar to Ernietta, although it is noted that many questions still remain, such as how did Pteridinium ingest the food particles.

== Distribution ==
Fossils of Pteridinium are most commonly found from the whole Nama Group in Namibia, alongside other records outside of Africa, such as the Rawnsley Quartzite in Australia, the Floyd Church Formation in North Carolina, the Ust-Pinega Formation in Russia, the Shibantan Member of the Dengying Formation in South China, as well as tentative occurrences in Ukraine and Canada.

== Taxonomy ==
Pteridinium currently contains two valid species, although notably has a varied selection of taxa that have been synonymised into it, which are as follows, after Runnegar et al. (2024) unless specified:

| Species | Authority | Location | Status | Notes | Refs |
|---|---|---|---|---|---|
| Pteridinium simplex | Gürich, 1930 | Namibia | valid | (Note: Pteridinium simplex originally was classified as Pteridium simplex, but was re-classified as Pteridinium simplex due to the original generic name having already been taken) | |
| Ernietta plateauensis | Pflug, 1966 | Namibia | neotype awaiting approval | (Note: It has been noted by Runnegar et al. (2024) that the holotype fossil of E. plateauensis is a fossil of P. simplex, which was noted in the original description by Pflug (1966) as well. Runnegar et al. (2024) has proposed that the original holotype of Erniograndis sandalix be made the neotype for E. plateauensis, as to retain the usage of a well known name) | |
| Pteridinium carolinaensis | St. Jean, 1973 | North Carolina | valid | (Note: Pteridinium carolinaensis originally was misidentified and classified as ?Paradoxides carolinaensis, but was re-classified as Pteridinium carolinaensis) | |
| Pteridinium nenoxa | Keller in Keller et al., 1974 | Russia | invalid | synonym of P. carolinaensis | |
| Onegia ?nenoxa | Sokolov, 1976 | Russia | invalid | nomen nudum applied to P. nenoxa | |
| Inkrylova lata | Fedonkin in Palij et al., 1979 | Russia | invalid | synonym of P. nenoxa | |

Pteridinium itself is a part of the family Pteridinidae, which is placed within the class Erniettomorpha, and is commonly considered a part of the wider phylum Petalonamae.

== See also ==
- List of Ediacaran genera
