= Dengying Formation =

Geologic formation in China

- Stratigraphic range: late Ediacaran; ~551–539 Ma
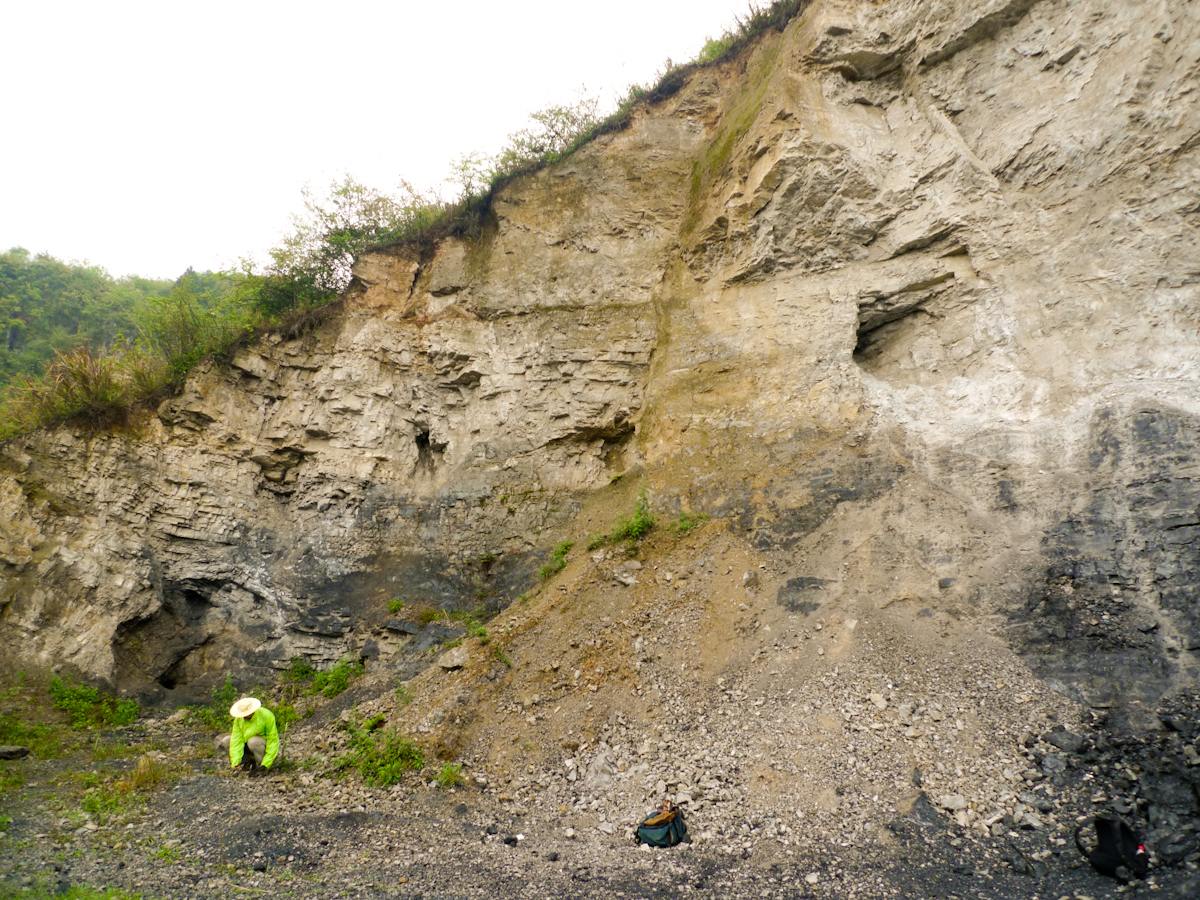
- Transition between uppermost Doushantuo Formation and lowermost Dengying Formation
- Type: Formation
- Sub-units: See: Members
- Underlies: Hubei Province; (Disconformably) Yanjiahe Formation; Yunnan Province; Zhujiaqing Formation; Shaanxi Province; Kuanchuanpu Formation; Huoshiwan Formation; Sichuan Province; Maidiping Formation; Qiongzhusi Formation; Jiangxi Province; Hetang Formation
- Overlies: Hubei Province; Doushantuo Formation; Yunnan Province; Lunasi Formation; Shaanxi Province; Doushantuo Formation; Sichuan Province; Labagang Formation; Doushantuo Formation; Jiangxi Province; Doushantuo Formation
- Thickness: 1,000 m (3,300 ft)

Lithology
- Primary: Dolomite
- Other: Chert, Limestone, Siltstone, Sandstone, Conglomerate, Mudstone, Shale

Location
- Coordinates: 30°59.12′N 111°13.27′E
- Region: Yangtze Gorges
- Country: China

Type section
- Named for: Dengying Gorge, Hubei
- Dengying Formation (China) Dengying Formation (Hubei)

The Dengying Formation is a large geologic formation found in South China, and was deposited during the late Ediacaran between 551 – 539 Ma on a shallow marine carbonate platform. Due to the great area the formation covers, it not only contains a wide range of members for each province it outcrops in, but also contains differing modes of taphonomic preservation, from the common Ediacaran-type preservation, to the rarer Burgess Shale-type preservation.

Recent studies from some of the middle members of the formation have also yielded rare transitional fossiliferous rocks, namely between the Ediacaran biota and the Cambrian biota, providing insight as to where some Cambrian lineages may have started and diversified from, and filling in many empty gaps between the Ediacaran and Cambrian.

== Geology ==
Due to the large area that the Dengying Formation covers, the geology and members within the formation differ from province to province. These members are listed below in ascending stratigraphic order (lowest to highest), under the respective provinces they are found in:

=== Members ===
==== Hubei Province Members ====
The formation within the Hubei Province primarily lies within the Yangtze Gorges area, overlaying the Doushantuo Formation, whilst it disconformably underlies the Cambrian aged Yanjiahe Formation.

- Hamajing Member: This member is characterized by light grey, medium- to thick-bedded dolomite, intercalated with thin layers of chert.
- Shibantan Member: This member is interpreted to represent a subtidal environment and is composed of dark grey, thin-bedded bituminous limestone. It is the most fossiliferous member of the Dengying Formation in Hubei and has yielded several trace fossils, such as Lamonte, as well as possible lobopodian trackways.
- Baimatuo Member: This member is primarily composed of light grey, thick-bedded dolomite.

Traditionally, the Tianzhushan Member was considered to be the uppermost unit of the Dengying Formation in Hubei. However, its small shelly fossils and Micrhystridium-like acritarchs are a shared characteristic with the Cambrian aged Yanjiahe Formation.

==== Yunnan Province Members ====
The formation can be found outcropping near the Fuxian Lake, and overlies the Lunasi Formation, whilst it underlies the Cambrian aged Zhujiaqing Formation.

- Donlongtan Member: This member is primarily composed of argilaceous dolomite rocks.
- Jiucheng Member: This member is dominated by various siltstone layers, with layers of sandstone throughout. This member is also fossiliferous in nature, containing the Jiangchuan Biota, with known forms such as Alienum and Lobodiscus being present with in member, as well as a number of yet to be described fossils which bear striking resemblances to many Cambrian animals.
- Baiyanshao Member: This member is predominately composed of dolomitic siltstone, which is argilaceous in nature.

==== Shaanxi Province Members ====
The formation in the Shaanxi Province is composed of three members, and is underlain by the Doushantuo Formation, whilst it is overlain by the Cambrain aged Kuanchuanpu and Huoshiwan Formations.

- Algal Dolomite: This member is predominately composed of light-gray peritidal dolostones, with paleo-karst structures being common throughout the member.
- Gaojiashan Member: This member is further sub-divided into three units. Unit 1 of the member is primarily composed of silstone, which it then inter-bedded with thin dolomite. This then transitions in Unit 2, which is predominately composed of dolomitic siltstones, with layers of calcareous mudstone and limestone found throughout. Then, at the top, Unit 3 differs greatly in being composed of conglomerate and sandstone, with layers of carbonate cement. This is also the fossiliferous member of the province, containing organisms such as Cloudina.
- Beiwan Member: This member is composed of grayish-white intra-clastic dolostone with occasional layers of chert near the base of the member, as well as locally occurring bitumen. It also contains an extensive microfossil assemblage.

Much like the Yanjiahe Formation in Hubei, the Kuanchuanpu Formation is also occasionally placed as a member of the Dengying Formation in Shaanxi, however it is likely separate for the same reasons.

==== Sichuan Province Members ====
The formation within the Sichuan Province is found outcropping in the Sichuan Basin in Southwestern China, as is primarily most well known for its gas reservoirs that can be found throughout the local area, such as the Weiyuan Gas Field. It is underlain once more by the Doushantuo Formation, whilst it is overlain by the Cambrian aged Qiongzhusi Formation.

- First Member: This member is predominately composed of gray dolomite, which is micritic in nature. There are also occasional algal dolomites throughout, with gypsum and mudstone inter-bedded within.
- Second Member: The algal dolomite notably increases in this member, which is grayish-white in colour. There are also layers of clotted dolomite and algal mat-stromatolite dolostone.
- Third Member: The algal dolomite decreases in this member, which is primarily composed of argillaceous dolomite, inter-bedded with mudstones and shales.
- Fourth Member: The algal dolomite becomes a light gray to grayish-white algal dolostone, which is laminated in nature, alongside clotted dolomite and micritic dolostone, with siliceous nodules found throughout the member.

=== Jiangxi Province Outcrop ===
The Dengying Formation can also be found outcropping in the northern areas of the Jiangxi Province as a light-gray, thick-bedded stromatolite dolostone, and is underlain by the upper phosphorite and dolomicrosparite dominant layers of the Doushantuo Formation, whilst it is overlain by the black shales of the Cambrian aged Hetang Formation. Due to the limited exposed outcrops in Jiangxi, proper sequencing of the local stratigraphy has not been fully studied.

== Dating ==
Biostratigraphic correlation table of Neoproterozoic formations in South Anhui and Hubei, China, including the Dengying Formation

The Dengying Formation goes right up to the boundary of the Ediacaran and Cambrian periods, currently dated to 538.8±0.6 Ma, whilst the age of the base of the formation varies depending on the province. The middle Gaojiashan Member from the Shaanxi Province has had U-Pb dating done on several detrital zircon crystals, which recovered a maximum deposition date of 548±8 ma. Meanwhile, the middle of the Third Member has been dated to 547.3±4.8 ma. The base of the Dengying Formation in the Yangtze Gorges Hubei Province has been firmly dated to 551.1±0.7 ma. This has seen the formation also roughly correlated to the Piyuancun Formation in South Anhui Province.

== Taphonomy ==
The Dengying Formation is home to at least three different styles of preservation, which includes the classic Ediacaran-type preservation seen in the Shibantan Biota where only a negative or positive print "death mask" of the organism is made, Pyritization as seen in the Gaojiashan Biota where any organic parts of the organisms are replaced with pyrite, and the rare Burgess Shale-type preservation seen in the Tongshan and Jiangchuan Biotas, where the bodies are preserved as carbonaceous films, including some examples of Phosphatization throughout the Jiangchuan Biota and Beiwan microfossil assemblage.

It has been noted that the Burgess Shale-type preservation may be rare due to a taphonomic bias of requiring exceptional conditions such as low oxygen, clay sediments and authigenic mineralisation of soft tissue to long-living minerals, as such making it difficult to find and Cambrian-like biotas in the Ediacaran.

== Paleobiota ==
The Dengying Formation is unique from most other Ediacaran formations, in that the top of the formation goes right up to the Ediacaran - Cambrian boundary, resulting in not only a wide array of Ediacaran organisms such as Paracharnia and Dickinsonia, but also rare examples of Cambrian-like organisms, such as Alienum. Alongside this there is also a notable number of ichnogenera in the form of burrows, which also become more common closer to the boundary. The formation is also well known for its abundant algal organisms, from Longfengshania to the enigmatic Vendotaenia.

Recent studies have also found rare examples of Burgess Shale-type Preservation, in what is known as the Tongshan Lagerstätte and the Jiangchuan Biota from the Jiucheng Member. These preserves a wide range of fossil forms, from the first rangeomorph fronds with Burgess Shale-type preservation in the Tongshan, to the first reports of more recognizable Cambrian-like organisms, bolstering evidence that bilaterian animals where diversifying around this time, back up by the increase in the well known various burrows, movement traces, etc.

The discovery of White Sea assemblage fossils such as Dickinsonia, and more recently Kimberella, in the lower Shibantan Member provide evidence that the fauna of the White Sea assemblage survived into the Nama assemblage, and permit researchers to see how the White Sea-Nama extinction affected White Sea organisms. This also brings into question the validity and definitions of the three assemblages, with calls to provide further clarity on said assemblages.'

Color key: Taxon / Reclassified taxon / Taxon falsely reported as present / Dubious taxon or junior synonym / Ichnotaxon / Ootaxon / Morphotaxon

Notes
Uncertain or tentative taxa are in small text
~~crossed out~~ taxa are discredited.

=== Proarticulata ===
Proarticulata
Genus	Species	Locality	Notes	Images
Dickinsonia	Dickinsonia sp.	Shibantan Member	Oval to elongated motile organism. Only one incomplete specimen is known.	

=== Petalonamae ===
Petalonamae
Genus	Species	Locality	Notes	Images
Arborea	A. arborea; A. denticulata; Arborea spp.	Shibantan Member	Frondose Organism.	
Charnia	Charnia sp.	Shibantan Member	Frondose Organism.	
Charniodiscus	Charniodiscus sp.	Shibantan Member	Frondose organism.	
Paracharnia	P. denyingensis	Shibantan Member	Frondose organism.	
Pteridinium	Pteridinium sp.	Shibantan Member	Frondose organism.	
Rangea	Rangea sp.	Shibantan Member	Frondose organism.	

=== Trilobozoa ===
Trilobozoa
Genus	Species	Locality	Notes	Images
Lobodiscus	L. tribrachialis	Middle Jiucheng Member (Qingshuigou section)	Tri-radial organism.	

=== Porifera ===
Porifera
Genus	Species	Locality	Notes	Images
Helicolocellus	H. cantori	Shibantan Member	Conical sponge, possible relations to hexactinelliid sponges.	

=== incertae sedis ===
incertae sedis
Genus	Species	Locality	Notes	Images
Anabarites	A. yuanbaoshanensis	Beiwan Member (Yuanbaoshan and Lijiagou sections)	Tubular organism.	
Alienum	A. velamenus	Middle Jiucheng Member	Vetulicolian-like organism.	
Aspidella	Aspidella sp.	Shibantan Member	Discoidal organism, possibly holdfasts of petalonamids.	
Cloudina	Cloudina sp.; C. hartmannae; C. ningqiangensis; C. xuanjiangpingensis; C. sinensis; C. (?) petala	Gaojiashan, Shibantan, Baimatuo, and Beiwan Members (Yuanbaoshan and Lijiagou sections)	Tubular organism.	
Curviacus	C. ediacaranus	Shibantan Member	Palaeopascichnid organism.	
Conotubus	C. hemiannulatus; C. bibendi	Gaojiashan Member and Beiwan Member (Yuanbaoshan section)	Tubular organism.	
Cycliomedusa	C. jiangchuanensis	Middle Jiucheng Member	Discoid organism.	
Dengyingia	D. pennata	Shibantan Member	Frondose organism which bears features found in both contemporary frondose forms such as Akrophyllas, and modern sea pens.	
Dictyotubulus	D. circularis	Beiwan Member (Yuanbaoshan section)	Non-biomineralised tubular organism.	
Eoandromeda	E. octobrachiata	Tongshan Lagerstätte	Discoid organism.	
Gaojiashania	G. cyclus	Gaojiashan Member	Tubular organism.	
Hiemalora	H. pleiomorpha	Shibantan Member	Discoid organism, possibly holdfasts of petalonamids.	
Multiconotubus	M. chinensis	Beiwan Member (Yuanbaoshan and Lijiagou sections)	Tubular organism.	
Kimberella	Kimberella sp.	Shibantan Member	Egg-shaped organism, possible mollusc. The youngest record of Kimberella, and the first record of Kimberella in carbonate rocks.	
Palaeorhopalon	P. spiniferum	Beiwan Member (Tudimiao, Yuanbaoshan, and Lijiagou sections)	Tubular organism.	
Palaeopascichnus	P. linearis	Tongshan Lagerstätte	Palaeopascichnid organism.	
Protoconites	P. minor	Tongshan Lagerstätte	Curved conical organism, possible relations to Cnidaria.	
Shufangtubulus	S. inornatus	Beiwan Member (Tudimiao section)	Tubular organism.	
Shaanxilithes	Shaanxilithes sp.	Jiucheng and Shibantan Members	Tubular organism. Previously reported as a junior synonym of Nenoxites and Gaojiashania, although recent studies regard it as a body fossil of a distinct genus.	
Sinotubulites	Sinotubulites sp.; S. baimatuoensis; S. hexagonus; S. pentacarinalis; S. triangularis	Beiwan Member (Tudimiao, Yuanbaoshan, and Lijiagou sections), Shibantan, Baimatuo, and Gaojiashan Members	Tubular organism.	
Wutubus	W. annularis	Shibantan Member	Tubular organism.	
Yangtziramulus	Y. zhangi	Shibantan Member	Enigmatic organism, affinities with other forms is unknown, although possibly related to the Petalonamae, like Charnia.	
Yilingia	Y. spiciformis	Shibantan Member	Bilterian animal of unknown affinities, with possible relations to Panarthopoda or Annelida.	

=== Flora ===
Flora
Genus	Species	Locality	Notes	Images
Longfengshania	L. elongata; L. spheria; L. stipitata; L. gemmiforma; L. qingbaikouensis; L. cordata; L. fusiformis; Longfengshania cf. L. ovalis; Longfengshania sp.	Middle Jiucheng Member	Thallus-like macroalgae.	
Paralongfengshania	P. qinyuensis; Paralongfengshania cf. P. sicyoides	Middle Jiucheng Member	Thallus-like macroalgae.	
Jiangchuania	J. taeniphylla; J. qingshuigouensis; Jiangchuania sp.	Middle Jiucheng Member	Thallus-like macroalgae.	
Protocodium	P. sinense	Gaojiashan Member	Codiacean alga.	
Baculiphyca	B. taeniata; B. yunnanoense	Middle Jiucheng Member and Tongshan Lagerstätte	Thallus-like macroalgae.	
Zhongbaodaophyton	Z. robustus	Tongshan Lagerstätte	Branching macroalgae.	
Doushantuophyton	D. lineare	Tongshan Lagerstätte	Branching macroalgae.	
Chuaria	C. circularis	Gaojiashan and Middle Jiucheng Members, and Tongshan Lagerstätte	Enigmatic fossil, possibly synonymous with Tawuia.	
Longifuniculum	L. dissolutum	Tongshan Lagerstätte	Whip-like macroalgae.	
Tawuia	T. danlensis	Middle Jiucheng Member	Sausage-shaped macroalgae.	
Houjiashania	H. yuxiensi; H. folim; Houjiashania sp.	Middle Jiucheng Member	Sausage-shaped macroalgae.	
Vendotaenia	V. antiqua; Vendotaenia sp.	Gaojiashan, Shibantan, and Middle Jiucheng Members	Ribbon-like Vendotaenid macroalgae.	
Tyrasotaenia	Tyrasotaenia sp.	Middle Jiucheng Member	Ribbon-like Vendotaenid macroalgae.	
Laminarites	Laminarites sp.	Sichuan Province	Ribbon-like macroalgae.	
Flabellophyton	F. typicum; Flabellophyton sp.	Shibantan and Middle Jiucheng Members	Filamentous macroalgae.	
Phacelofimbria	P. emeishanensis	Sichuan Province	Tube-like macroalgae.	
Manicosiphonia	M. quadricellus; M. fissilis; M. conserta	Sichuan Province	Cone-shaped macroalgae. Possibly mistakenly referred to as Siphonia in Song et al., 2018, which is the genus name of the Cretaceous sponge Siphonia.	
Actinophycus	A. nanjiangensis	Sichuan Province	Branching macroalgae.	
Acus	A. muricatus; A. concentricus	Sichuan Province	Dense, thorn-like macroalgae.	
Balios'	B. pinguensis; B. comfertus	Sichuan Province	Unbranching macroalgae.	
Praesolenopora	Praesolenopora sp.	Sichuan Province	Tube-like macroalgae, was considered a pseudofossil by Martin Glaessner, 1980, although this has not since been pursude.	
Paleomicrocystis	Paleomicrocystis sp.	Sichuan Province	Globular macroalgae.	
Parasolenopora	P. subradiata	Sichuan Province	Macroalgae.	
Gleorrh	Gleorrh sp.	Sichuan Province	Macroalgae.	
Epiphiton	Epiphiton (?) sp.	Sichuan Province	Clotted macroalgae, is noted to resemble Epiphiton.	
Renaclis-like organism	Renaclis (?) sp.	Sichuan Province	Macroalgae, is noted to resemble Renaclis.	
Oscillatoriopsis	O. obtusa sp.	Shibantan Member	Cyanobacteria.	Line drawing reconstruction of Oscillatoriopsis
Girvanella	Girvanella sp.	Gaojiashan Member	Cyanobacterial colony.	
Beltanelliformis	B. brunsae	Tongshan Lagerstätte	Cyanobacterial colony.	
Gesinella	Gesinella sp.	Tongshan Lagerstätte	Cyanobacterial colony.	Line drawing of Gesinella gracilis
Osagia	O. oncolite; O. stratifera	Sichuan Province	Cyanobacterial colony.	
Baicalia	B. stromatolite	Sichuan Province	Cyanobacterial colony.	
Cambricodium	C. capilloides	Beiwan Member (Yuanbaoshan and Lijiagou sections)	Cyanobacterial colony.	
Subtifloria	S. delicata	Beiwan Member (Lijiagou section)	Cyanobacterial colony.	
Obruchevella	O. parva	Beiwan Member (Lijiagou section)	Cyanobacterial colony.	
Tasmanites	Tasmanites sp.	Sichuan Province	Unicellular algae.	

=== Microorganisms ===
Microorganisms
Genus	Species	Locality	Notes	Images
Protolagena	P. limbata; P. gaojiashanensis; P. papillatus	Lower Shibantan (Gaojiashan and Lijiagou sections) and Beiwan Members (Lijiagou section)	Vase-like microorganism.	
Sicylagena	S. formosa; S. latistoma	Lower Shibantan Member (Gaojiashan and Lijiagou sections)	Vase-like microorganism.	
Dictyosphaera	Dictyosphaera sp.	Sichuan Province	Unicelluar microorganism.	
Protoleiosphaeridium	Protoleiosphaeridium sp.	Sichuan Province	Acritarch.	
Leiosphaeridia	Leiosphaeridia sp.	Sichuan Province	Acritarch. Misspelled as "Leiosphaeridea" in Pu et al., 1991.	
Microconcentrica	Microconcentrica sp.	Sichuan Province	Acritarch.	
Polyedrosphaeridium	Polyedrosphaeridium sp.	Sichuan Province	Acritarch.	
Leiominunscula	Leiominunscula sp.	Sichuan Province	Acritarch.	
Trematosphaeridium	Trematosphaeridium sp.	Sichuan Province	Acritarch.	
Orygmatosphaeridium	Orygmatosphaeridium sp.	Sichuan Province	Acritarch.	
Granomarginata	Granomarginata sp.	Sichuan Province	Acritarch.	
Lophosphaeridium	Lophosphaeridium sp.	Sichuan Province	Acritarch.	
Trachysphaeridium	Trachysphaeridium sp.	Sichuan Province	Acritarch.	
Tortofimria	Tortofimria sp.	Sichuan Province	Acritarch.	
Archaeohystrichosphaeridium	Archaeohystrichosphaeridium sp.	Sichuan Province	Acritarch.	
Micrhystridium	Micrhystridium sp.	Sichuan Province	Acritarch.	
Reticulatasporites	Reticulatasporites sp.	Sichuan Province	Acritarch.	
Favososphaeridium	Favososphaeridium sp.	Sichuan Province	Acritarch.	
Archaeodiscina	Archaeodiscina sp.	Sichuan Province	Acritarch.	
Triangumorpha	Triangumorpha sp.	Sichuan Province	Acritarch.	
Gloeocapsamorpha	Gloeocapsamorpha sp.	Sichuan Province	Acritarch.	
Brocholaminaria	Brocholaminaria sp.	Sichuan Province	Acritarch.	
Retinarites	Retinarites sp.	Sichuan Province	Acritarch.	
Prototracheites	Prototracheites sp.	Sichuan Province	Acritarch.	
Lignum	Lignum sp.	Sichuan Province	Acritarch.	

=== Ichnogenera ===
Ichnogenera
Genus	Species	Locality	Notes	Images
Lamonte	L. trevallis	Middle Shibantan Member (South Quarry)	Burrows.	
Yichnus	Y. levis	Shibantan Member	Burrows.	
Streptichnus	Streptichnus sp.	Shibantan Member	Burrows.	
Helminthoidichnites	Helminthoidichnites sp.		Burrows.	
Nenoxites	Nenoxites sp.		Movement traces.	
Torrowangea	Torrowangea sp.		Burrows.	
Palaeophycus	Palaeophycus sp.		Burrows.	

=== Undescribed ===
Undescribed
Genus	Species	Locality	Notes	Images
ESEN 0013	???	Tongshan Lagerstätte (Wanjia section)	Tubular organism, possible affinities to Metazoa.	
Undescribed rangeomorph "ESEN 0016"	???	Tongshan Lagerstätte (Wanjia section)	Frondose organism, 3 distinct lobe-like regions, consisting of a thick stalk and two petaloids, which are made up of tightly packed branches.	
Fan-shaped rangeomorphs	???	Tongshan Lagerstätte (Wanjia section)	Two frondose organisms with a similar appearance to Bradgatia, with one of the specimens, ESEN 0018, preserving with a possible holdfast.	
Undescribed rangeomorph "ESEN 0019"	???	Tongshan Lagerstätte (Wanjia section)	Frondose organism, with a similar appearance to Charniodiscus, consisting of a thick stalk and two petaloids, which are made up of tightly packed branches, also preserves a notable holdfast.	
Undescribed rangeomorph "ESEN 0020"	???	Tongshan Lagerstätte (Wanjia section)	Elongated frondose organism, with a similar appearance to Paracharnia, consisting of a thin stalk and two petaloids, which are made up of tightly packed branches, alongside a possible holdfast at its base.	
Undescribed frond "ESEN 0021"	???	Tongshan Lagerstätte (Wanjia section)	Typical frondose organism, possibly with three petaloids in total, and a holdfast structure and probable stem are also present.	
Undescribed tetraradial organism "YNGIP 90305"	???	Middle Jiucheng Member (Shanglijiao section)	Tetra-radial organism, noted to bear similarities to Tribrachidium and Lobodiscus in the shape of its lobes, whilst its tetra-radial body plan is similar to Conomedusites.	
Undescribed Haootia-like organisms	???	Middle Jiucheng Member	Haootia-like organisms, which are cup-like in appearance with terminal arms, and is fibrous in nature. The largest specimen is 15 mm (0.6 in) in length and 20 mm (0.8 in) in width, making them smaller than Haootia, and may represent a new genus alongside Haootia and Mamsetia.	
Undescribed ctenophore-like organism "YNGIP 90303"	???	Middle Jiucheng Member	A singular fossil that bears similarities to known ctenophore fossils, getting up to 18 mm (0.7 in) in length and 10 mm (0.4 in) in width, and has been compared to Ctenorhabdotus.	
Undescribed Mackenzia-like organism "YNGIP 90304"	???	Middle Jiucheng Member	A singular fossil that bears similarities to Mackenzia, with the fossil being compared to known mackenziid fossil from the Chengjiang Biota, although it is noted they are much smaller, only attaining a length of 18 mm (0.7 in) in length and 3 mm (0.1 in) in width.	
Undescribed worm-like organisms	???	Middle Jiucheng Member	The most numerous bilaterian organism in the, consisting of a large holdfast disc and an elongated vermiform body with a terminal mouth, with the largest example getting up to 61 mm (2.4 in) in length and 2.7 mm (0.1 in) at the widest, whilst the holdfast is up to 15 mm (0.6 in) in diameter. It has been noted that the previously described Cycliomedusa, also from this member, bears a striking resemblance to the holdfasts of these fossils, and may likely be said holdfasts preserved in another layer, with the body in another.	
Undescribed sausage-shaped organism "YNGIP 90311"	???	Middle Jiucheng Member	A single sausage shaped organism with a circular terminal opening inferred to be a mouth, and a long darker lined down the centre, interpreted as a gut.	
Undescribed Herpetogaster-like organisms	???	Middle Jiucheng Member	A number of fossils that bear similarities to Herpetogaster, with a coiled body set on top of a stem, with tentacle-like structures on wider head-region, although are notably simpler than that seen on Herpetogaster.	
Undescribed Margaretia-like organisms	???	Middle Jiucheng Member	Elongated fossils with ovoid holes running along the full length of the body in rows, bearing similarities to Margaretia, a tube-like organism used as a dwelling for hemichordate worms. The largest complete fossil reaches up to 30 mm (1.2 in) in length and 4 mm (0.2 in) in width.	
Cloudinids	???	Beiwan Member (Yuanbaoshan section)	Undescribed tubular organisms.	
Problematic spherical fossil	???	Beiwan Member (Yuanbaoshan section)	Undescribed spherical fossil of unknown placement.	
Conical tube with round apex	???	Beiwan Member (Lijiagou section)	Tubular organisms of unknown placement.	
Conical tube with transverse annulations	???	Beiwan Member (Lijiagou section)	Tubular organisms of unknown placement.	
Conical tube with transverse ridges	???	Beiwan Member (Lijiagou section)	Tubular organisms of unknown placement.	
Zhenba columns	???	Tongshan Lagerstätte (Wanjia section)	Possible affinities with coralline algae.	
Doushantuophyton-like form	???	Tongshan Lagerstätte (Wanjia section)	Doushantuophyton-like form, possibly macroalgae. Bears similarties to Doushantuophyton.	
Baseball bat-shaped form	???	Tongshan Lagerstätte (Wanjia section)	Baseball bat-shaped form, possibly macroalgae.	
Irregular circular form	???	Tongshan Lagerstätte (Wanjia section)	Curved, oblong-shaped form, possibly macroalgae.	
Net-like form	???	Tongshan Lagerstätte (Wanjia section)	Netted form, possibly macroalgae.	
Ribbon-like form	???	Tongshan Lagerstätte (Wanjia section)	Ribbon like form, possibly macroalgae.	
Archaeooides-like fossil	???	Beiwan Member (Yuanbaoshan section)	Undescribed fossil that bears similarities to the microalgae Archaeooides.	
Bilateria indet.	Unapplicable	Tongshan Lagerstätte (Wanjia section)	Known to have several pairs of appendages, but its exact affinity is unknown	
Palaeophycus-like trace	???	Middle Jiucheng Member	Sinous burrows, which bear similarities to Palaeophycus.	

== See also ==
- Ediacaran biota
