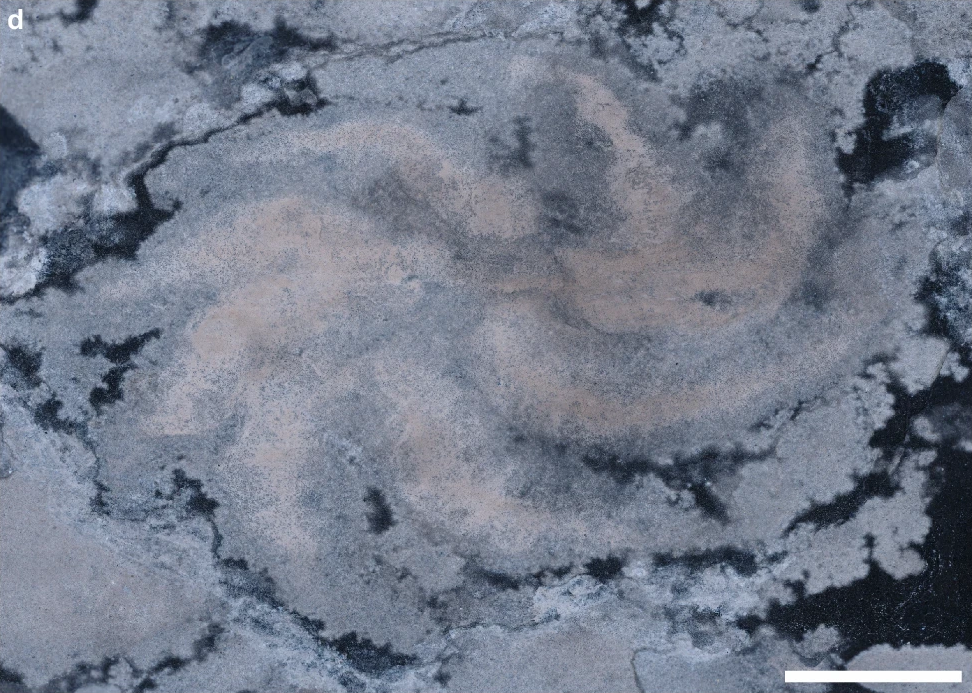
- Eoandromeda octobrachiata from the Tongshan Lagerstätte, Dengying Formation, China

Scientific classification
- Kingdom: Animalia
- Phylum: incertae sedis
- Class: incertae sedis
- Order: incertae sedis
- Family: incertae sedis
- Genus: †Eoandromeda
- Species: †E. octobrachiata

Binomial name
- †Eoandromeda octobrachiata Tang, Yin, Bengtson, Liu, Wang and Gao, 2008

= Eoandromeda =

Eoandromeda Temporal range: Ediacaran, approx. 580–550 Ma

Genus of Ediacaran animal

Eoandromeda is an Ediacaran organism consisting of eight radial spiral arms, and known from two taphonomic modes: the standard Ediacara type preservation in Australia, and as carbonaceous compressions from the Doushantuo Formation of China, where it is abundant.

== Morphology ==
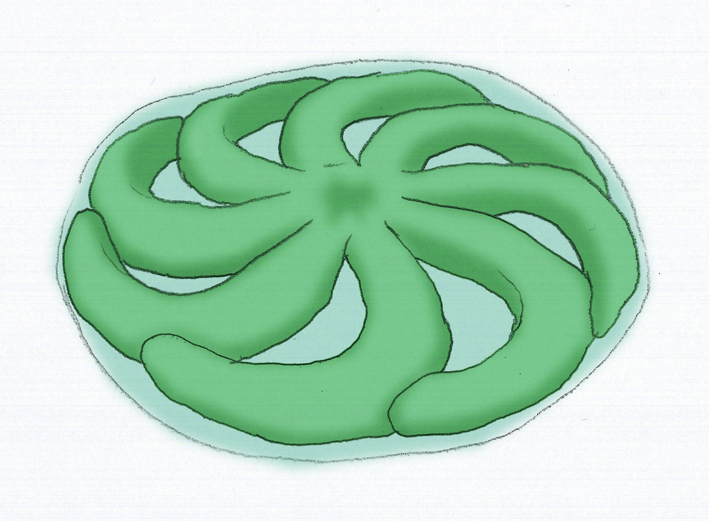
Artist restoration

A few dozen fossil specimens are known, ranging from about 1 to 4 cm in diameter; they are circular in outline and their eight arms, with closed ends, spiral either clockwise or counterclockwise. Ridges cut across both the inside and outside of the spiral arms. The arms of the Australian individuals are longer and more tightly coiled than those of the Chinese, despite the Australian individuals not attaining as large a diameter; they are more often kinked.

== Affinity ==
The organism was first interpreted as a trace fossil, and has also been considered to represent an agglutinating foraminiferan. However, the discovery of the Chinese fossils, which have preserved organic matter, ruled out these interpretations, because the Burgess shale type preservation displayed required relatively robust organic material to start with. Its spiral form has also led to comparison with the fossil embryos also preserved in the Doushantuo Formation; the exact purpose still remains out on this until intermediate forms are found.

The organism bears a very superficial resemblance to echinoderms, ctenophores and to some of the other Ediacara biota, but it lacks sufficient physical characteristics to ascertain with any degree of certainty whether it is indeed an animal or not. If it is, it would be the earliest known fossil of an adult animal; and its anatomy is consistent with that expected from the earliest animals. However, it is not perfectly clear that it is an animal; algae, the dominant constituent of the Doushantuo biota, cannot be ruled out, except that Eoandromeda seems a little too complex.

== Taphonomic significance ==
In the Ediacaran (Vendian) period there are two biotas of multicellular organisms; as now understood, these biota do not generally share members, as was considered until recently:

- Ediacara-type biota (it is in broad sense: Ediacara-, Nama-, Avalon-type ecological assemblage) it is community of the Metazoa and problematic organisms: Dickinsonia, Yorgia, Kimberella, Charnia, Charniodiscus, Cyclomedusa, Ediacaria, Parvancorina, Pteridinium, Rangea, Fractofusus, Tribrachidium, Hiemalora, palaeopascichnids and others. These organisms mainly are negative and positive imprints on the base of sandstone beds with the "elephant skin" and tubercle texture diagnostic of microbial mats (Ediacara-type preservation), sandy casts in the beds of sandstone (Nama-type preservation), Avalon-type preservation characterized imprints on the top mudstone surface covered by volcanic ash, and in Khatyspyt-type preservation the fossils are found in finely laminated to medium-bedded, nodular bituminous limestones.
- Miaohe-type biota characterizes assemblage of algal macrofossils: Beltanelloides, Mezenia, Sinospongia, Jiuqunaoella, Grypania, Liulingjitaenia, Tawuia, Calyptrina, Cucullus and others. These fossils are of the form of flat organic carbonaceous films; it is shadow left by organic matter of the organism flesh (it is looks like of the Burgess shale type preservation).

Trying to relate organisms that are preserved in the two modes is immensely problematic, because they preserve such different parts of organisms; the imprints preserve a casts of the organism's outline, whereas the carbonaceous films display a shadow left by any resistant organic matter. This has made relating the two taphonomic types very difficult: Eoandromeda is one of the few organisms which can convincingly be compared in both taphonomic modes. Such cases of preservation are known also for organisms related to the Anfesta-Albumares-like fossils from the Doushantuo Formation, for Beltanelloides sorichevae from the Lyamtsa Formation of the White Sea area, Russia and Doushantuo Formation, and possible for Cyclomedusa davidi from Perevalok Formation of the Central Urals.

== See also ==
- List of Ediacaran genera
