= Dengyingia =

Dengyingia Temporal range: late Ediacaran ~550–543 Ma

Scientific classification
- Kingdom: Animalia
- Phylum: incertae sedis
- Genus: †Dengyingia; Chen et al., 2026
- Species: †D. pennata

Binomial name
- †Dengyingia pennata Chen et al., 2026

Extinct frondose organism from the late Ediacaran

Dengyingia is an extinct frondose genus from the late Ediacaran of China, and was alive around 550 – 543 Ma. It is a monotypic genus, containing only Dengyingia pennata. Combining features seen in both the classical Ediacaran fronds, and modern Sea pens, Dengyingia's highly complex morphology sees it placed as a intermediate form between aforementioned Ediacaran fronds and Sea pens.

== Discovery and naming ==
The holotype, and corresponding paratypes and fossils of Dengyingia were found in the Shibantan Member of the Dengying Formation, in the Yangtze Gorges in South China in 2025, and were formally described and named in 2026.

The generic name Dengyingia derives from the place name "Dengying Gorge", from where the type species was recovered from. The specific name pennata derives directly from the Latin word "pennata", to mean "feather-shaped", in reference to the overall morphology of the fossils.

== Description ==
Artistic reconstruction of Dengyingia. Artwork by Z. Chen.

Dengyingia pennata is a frondose organism, which is notably narrow and tall, getting up to 220 mm (9 in) in height and over 30 mm (1 in) at its widest, and it bears a holdfast structure at its base. The holdfast and central stalk are connected by a cylindrical stem, measuring up to 70 mm (3 in) in length and 17 mm (1 in) wide, and notably has two or more pairs of basal leaves emerging from it. These are narrow, and at their longest can get up to 70 mm (3 in), making them considerably longer than the main branches of the petalodium. The petalodium itself is noted to be lanceolate in overall shape, and is composed of two rows of up to 20 unattached primary branches emerging from the central stalk with glided symmetry, expect at the base of the central stalk, where the branches emerge directly on either side from each other. At their largest, the branches measure in at 40 mm (2 in) in length and 10 mm (0 in) in width, and are noted to expand slightly at their bases when attached to the central stalk. They are also notably flexible and free to move, evidenced by the constant twisting, folding, curling and overlapping observed in fossil material, alongside this they also have a two-sided differentiation, with the obverse side being smooth and fringed in second-order branches, whilst the reverse side is covered in a dense collection of these second-order branches which are oriented perpendicular to the primary branch. These second-order branches are further subdivided into smaller, third-order branches.

Dengyingia is inferred to have had a basal growth strategy, with the addition of new primary branches at the base of the petalodium, based on the smallest branches being at the base, whilst the distal branches are much longer. As such, the newly added basal primary branches would slowly move up and elongate distally, resulting in mature Dengyingia with longer apical branches.

== Taphonomy ==
Terminology, sketches, and overview of the type specimen.

Dengyingia is usually found preserved oriented in similar directions, inferring that the burial process was influenced by water flow. The reverse side is also commonly found to be the one facing up from the rock surface, implying this side was against the water flow in life. The fronds are preserved in high-relief, meaning they stick out from the rocks surface as three-dimensional casts, with the rock of the cast being the same carbonate material as the matrix, although lighter in colour. The holdfast, stem and basal leaves are more commonly preserved in hyporelief, meaning they are impressions in the rocks surface.

There can also be found, in a similar but lighter hyporelief compared to the basal leaves, what are referred to as "Shadow branches" around the petalodium, and are notably similar to sole markings. Although, researchers noted that unlike most sole marks produced from currents, the Shadow branches, as well as the basal leaves, emerge from both sides of the frond with very little preference to a specific orientation. Instead, it has been inferred that they are biological markings, made when the organism was felled, before the branches subsequently shrank and curled up after death.

== Palaeoecology ==
Due to the exceptional preservation of the fossil material, it has been inferred that Dengyingia was a sessile benthic organism, anchored to the seafloor via the use of a bulbous holdfast, permitting it to stand up into the water column, with the reverse side oriented against the water flow in order to maximise is suspension-feeding efficiency.

The use of suspension-feeding is notably different compared to older frondose taxa, with rangeomorphs possibly making use of osmotrophy, whilst some arboreomorphs made use of either passive absorption, or low-flow suspension feeding over their constrained primary branches. Meanwhile, Dengyingia's unconstrained primary branches permits water to freely flow all around the branches, instead of over them, giving it a much larger surface area to feed, making it much more efficient than what came before it. Alongside this, it is noted that the niche that later sea pens would take had already been explored much earlier by Dengyingia than thought some 550 Ma.

== Affinities ==
Dengyingia is noted to bear close similarities with the arboreomorphs, primarily Akrophyllas and Arborea, primarily in the bi-foliate petalodium, and two-sided differentiation. Despite this, Dengyingia also has features not found in either, from its notably elongate stem, and reduced central stalk, where Akrophyllas has a notably short stem, and Arborea and notably wide stalk. It has also been compared to Charniodiscus, again both bearing a bi-foliate petalodium, a lack of a backing-sheet, and freely moving primary branches, although Charniodiscus has had a varied taxonomic history, ranging from being either multi-foliate or bi-foliate, whether it bore a backing-sheet or not, and the lack of third-order branches. Alongside this, researchers also not that several species, and even morphotypes, assigned to Charniodiscus may represent different architectural types. In terms of Dengyingia, it can be further separated from Charniodiscus with its two-sided differentiation, growth pattern, and the morphology of its central stalk.

When compared to the rangeomorphs, such as Culmofrons and Charnia, it also bears similar features to these, alongside notable differences again. With Culmnofrons, they both bear notably elongate stems, although Culmofrons has a much different branching architecture and fewer primary branches than Dengyingia. With Charnia, they both share complex branching architecture alongside folding and furling on the primary branches, as well as third-order branches. Despite this, Charnia's branches are noted to not be free from each other as is seen in Dengyingia.

The growth strategy of Dengyingia is noted to also be different to what is seen in contemporary Ediacaran taxa with is basal growth, where fossil organisms such as Fractofusus grew laterally with the addition of new branches bidirectionally, maintaining it spindle-like appearance, whilst the aforementioned Charnia grew top-down, with the addition of new primary branches at its top, with the older branches at the base of its petalodium. It also differs to non-frondose taxa, such as Dickinsonia, which grew with the addition of new isomers at its front, with regulated inflation of said isomers as they grew to preserve its overall shape.

Dengyingia has also been compared to that of modern sea pens, with it bearing similarities to such organisms, from its free moving primary branches, notable two-sided differentiation, and basal growth. With this, researchers noted that this was cause for re-examination of the old debate comparing the frondose organisms of the Ediacaran with that of sea pens. Martin Glaessner (1959) had proposed a pennatulacean affinity for then described Ediacaran fronds, primarily based on the notable similarities in morphology, although later studies would reject this proposal. These rejections would be based on the differing growth patterns, and constrained primary branches. Dengyingia is thus noted to address these objections directly with its complex morphology and growth pattern. As such, with these similarities between not only the frondose organisms of the Ediacaran, but also modern sea pens, Dengyingia has been placed between the two groups via morphospace analysis, representing an intermediate form between the two, although it is slightly closer to the Ediacaran fronds.
