= Orbisiana =

Orbisiana Temporal range: late Ediacaran ~575–538 Ma
- A fossil of Orbisiana spumea

Scientific classification
- Domain: Eukaryota
- Informal group: †Palaeopascichnida
- Genus: †Orbisiana; Sokolov, 1976

Type species
- †Orbisiana simplex Sokolov, 1976

Species
- O. simplex Sokolov, 1976; O. spumea Kolesnikov et al., 2022; O. intorta Kolesnikov et al., 2022

Synonyms
- Neonereites Sokolov & Fedonkin, 1984; N. multiserialis Ivantsov et al., 2018

Enigmatic agglutinating organism from the Ediacaran

Orbisiana is an enigmatic extinct organism from the Ediacaran, and is made up of agglutinated spherical or hemispherical chambers. Recent studies have suggested and supported an affinity with Palaeopascichnus, and other similar organisms from the Ediacaran.

== Discovery ==
The holotype fossil of Orbisiana was found in the Soligalich 7 core, which was collected from the Lower Member of the Gavrilov Yam Formation in Ladoga, Western Russia sometime during the 1960s, and was formally described and named in 1976.

== Description ==
Orbisiana is an agglutinating organism, consisting of spherical to hemispherical chambers arranged in long strings or clustered aggregates with an irregular outline. The chambers themselves are commonly found getting up to 0.2–2.6 mm (0.01–0.10 in) in diameter, and in all known specimens, the walls of the chambers are composed of a carbonaceous material, and are in-filled with sediment that is similar, or the same, as the matrix rock outside the fossils. The overall body can be composed of 4 to 150 uniform chambers reaching up to 70 mm (2.8 in) in length, with some specimens showing dichotomous branching, although this is noted to be uncommon.

== Palaeoecology ==
Specimens of Orbisiana are commonly preserved as two to three-dimensional compressions in the rock, with the walls being either carbonaceous or pyritic in composition. From this, with 3D scanning of three-dimensional specimens, it was found that the chambers are straight cylinders, which are open at either end. This suggested that the walls of Orbisiana are partly rigid, as well as possibly being partially embedded into the sediment, meaning that Orbisiana was an benthic organism that lived either on top of or partially buried in sediments. A prior study also noted that Orbisiana likely favoured calm and well aerated shallow marine waters.

A later study done in 2018 found that the chambers of Orbisiana are not open ended, and may instead be a result of the local taphonomy, although is still regarded as a benthic organism. The study suggested that the walls may have been made up of clay grains in life, which were "glued" together to form said chambers, and as such would have easily collapsed during burial.

== Affinities ==
Since it was discovered, Orbisiana has been suggested to be a number of things. When originally described in 1976, it was interpreted to be a aggregate of large cells, although in 1984 two studies had been published, with one interpreting Orbisiana to be fecal pellets, and the other suggesting it to be an acritarch. Later, in 1992 and 1994, it was further reinterpreted as an algae.

But, in 2014 when the Lantian forms were properly described, it was noted that their general morphology discounts any of these prior interpretations, and is instead regarded as problematica until further evidence is found, although it was also noted that Orbisiana bears morphological similarities with other agglutinating organisms, such as Palaeopascichnus, and was also placed into the proposed group Palaeopascichnida in the same year. These probable affinities with the palaeopascichnids has been further supported after the rediscovery of the previously lost holotype specimen, although the Lantian forms would be synonymised into Palaeopascichnus alongside this rediscovery.

== Taxonomy and Distribution ==
Orbisiana contains three valid species which are restricted to Asia, and one now synonmyised species, which are as follows:

- † O. simplex Sokolov, 1976 - Known from across the White Sea area in Russia, as well as Eastern Siberia.
- † O. spumea Kolesnikov et al., 2022 - Known from the Ustʹ Pinega Formation, Russia.
- † O. intorta Kolesnikov et al., 2022 - Known from across the White Sea area in Russia.
- † O. linearis Chen, 1994 - Known from the middle Ediacaran Lantian Formation, Anhui Province, South China. Later studies moved the species into Palaeopascichnus.

Specimens which are unattributed to either species have also been found in the Dongpo Formation in Central China,, as well as probable occurrences in the Rocky Harbour Formation in Canada.

== See also ==
- Palaeopascichnida
