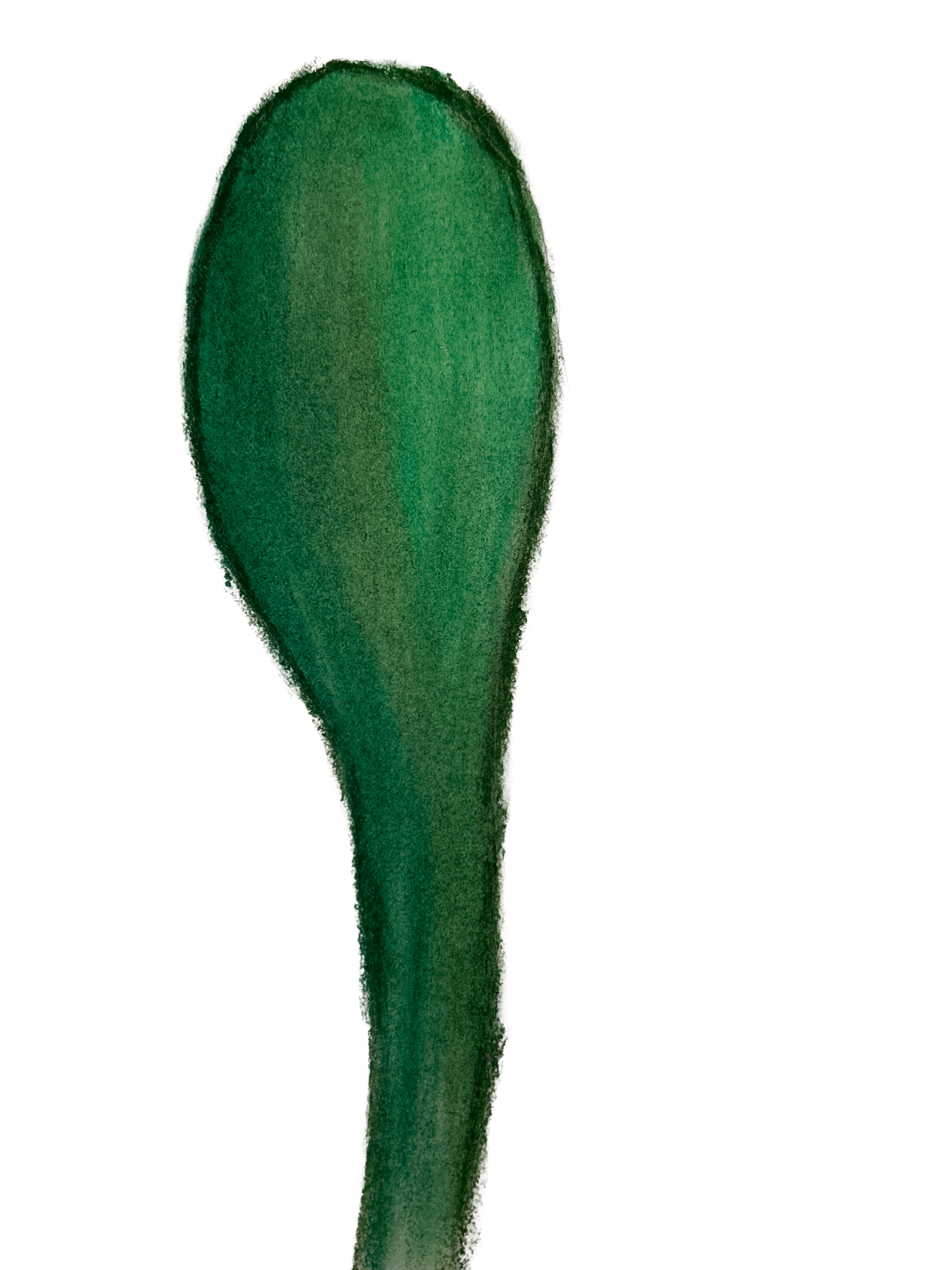
- Reconstruction of Longfengshania stipitata as an alga

Scientific classification
- Domain: Eukaryota
- (unranked): incertae sedis
- Genus: †Longfengshania; Du in Du et Tian, 1982

Type species
- † Longfengshania longipetiolata emend. Niu, 2019

Species
- L. stipitata (Du in Du et Tian, 1982); L. elongata (Du et Duan, 1983); L. ovalis (Du et Duan, 1983); L. longipetiolata (Du and Tian, 1985); L. spheria (Du et Tian, 1986); L. gemmiforma (Du et Tian, 1986); L. qingbaikouensis (Xiao, 1990); L. stenophylla (Tang, 1995); L. minima (Ding in Ding et al., 1996); L. ellipticulum (Chen et al., 1999); L. cordata (Xu, 2002); L. fusiformis (Tang et al., 2007); L. dicrana (Du et al., 2009); L. foliolatusa (Du et al., 2009); L. fungorumis (Liu, 2018); L. brachypodus (Niu, 2019); L. subelliptica (Niu, 2019)

= Longfengshania =

Longfengshania Temporal range: Statherian–Early Cambrian

Extinct enigmatic eukaryote

Longfengshania is an extinct genus of enigmatic eukaryote known from fossils ranging between the Statherian and the early Cambrian. Among the previously identified pre-Cryogenian macroalgae, Longfengshania is unique due to it possessing a stipe, blade, and holdfast-like structure.

== Discovery ==
Fossils of Longfengshania were first discovered from the Longshan Formation of Yanshan County, Hebei in North China, and was formally described and named in 1982.

== Description ==
Longfengshania from the Ancanping assemblage of the Doushantuo Formation

Longfengshania is most commonly found as an oval to discoidal blade sitting on top of a usually thin stipe. Specimens from the Shiwangzhuang and Jiuliqiao formations have probable holdfasts at the base of this stipe.

There is a wide range of sizes between species of Longfengshania, with the largest specimens coming from the Longshan Formation, bearing blades up to 13 mm (0.5 in) long and stipes up to 20 mm (0.8 in) long. The smallest specimens come from the Doushantuo Formation, with blades up to 0.7 mm (0.0 in) or less in diameter.

== Distribution ==
Longfengshania has a notably wide geographical range, being found across in formations five paleo-continents, such as the early Ediacaran aged Ancanping Assemblage in the lower sections of the Doushantuo Formation in South China, the late Ediacaran aged Dengying Formation also in South China,the Mesoproterozoic to Tonian aged Longshan, Jiuliqiao, and Shiwangzhuag Formations in North China, as well as the Tonian aged Changlongshan Formation in South China, the Ediacaran aged Liuchapo Formation in Central China, the Cambrian aged Maotianshan Shales in South China, the Ediacaran aged Sirbu Shale and Nagod Limestone of the wider Vindhyan Supergroup in Central India, the Tonian aged Little Dal Group of the Mackenzie Mountains in Northwest Canada, as well as in the Khatyspyt Formation in Siberia, Russia.

== See also ==
- Tawuia
