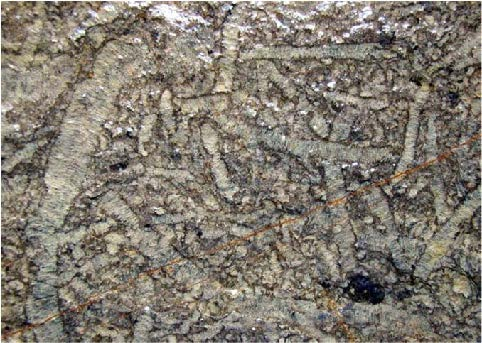
- A slab of Shaanxilithes ningqiangensis from the Shaanxi Province, China.

Scientific classification
- Kingdom: Animalia
- Phylum: incertae sedis
- Genus: †Shaanxilithes; Xing et al., 1984
- Species: †S. ningqiangensis

Binomial name
- †Shaanxilithes ningqiangensis Xing et al., 1984

Synonyms
- Genus: Helanoichnus Yang and Zheng, 1985; Parascalarituba Yang and Zheng, 1985; Species: Helanoichnus helanensis Yang and Zheng, 1985; Parascalarituba ningxiaensis Yang and Zheng, 1985; Shaanxilithes erodus Zhang, 1986; Palaeopascichnus meniscatus Shen et al., 2007; Palaeopascichnus minimus Shen et al., 2007

= Shaanxilithes =

Shaanxilithes Temporal range: late Ediacaran ~550–543 Ma

Extinct enigmatic tubular organism

Shaanxilithes is an extinct tubular organism from the late Ediacaran of Asia and Africa. It is a monotypic genus, containing only Shaanxilithes ningqiangensis.

Once considered a trace fossil, and a junior synonym of either Nenoxites and Gaojiashania, later studies found it to be a body fossil of a distinct genus with a tube-in-tube construction, bearing similarities to the cloudinids. Another study would instead note there being a group Shaanzilithes-like of organisms, including Shaanxilithes and Nenoxites, and put forward a total-group eumetazoan interpretation for Shaanxilithes. Alongside this, its wide distribution, but constrained temporal range across Asia and Africa has seen some studies consider it for use as an index fossil, with some more recent studies done in China using them as such.

== Discovery ==
The fossil material for Shaanxilithes was found in the Gaojiashan Member of the Dengying Formation, in the Shaanxi Province in South China in 1975 and originally referred to the tubular taxa Sabellidites, but was later re-described and formally named in 1984.

== Description ==
Shaanxilithes ningqiangensis is a long, tube-in-tube organism, getting up to 180 mm (7.1 in) in length, and 0.8–9.5 mm (0.0–0.4 in) in width. Shaanxilithes is commonly found straight with a consistent width and smooth margin, with the tube itself covered in dense, irregular transverse annulations up the length of the body, numbering between 30 and 50 annulations in a centimetre. This is interpreted as the external tube in Shaanxilithes, which was possibly flexible in life and may have stopped the internal tube from collapsing. Meanwhile, the internal tube is of a funnel-in-funnel construction, and is commonly thinner than known external tube material, coming in at 0.3–5.1 mm (0.0–0.2 in) in width, although this can be found attaining widths of 11 mm (0.4 in).

== Affinities ==
When it was formally described in 1984, Shaanxilithes was originally considered to be a trace fossil. Although, over the intervening years, and even before the official description, Shaanxilithes was considered to be a body fossil in multiple studies, although with differing interpretations as to where it was placed, ranging from being placed as an algae, a pogonophoran, to a metazoan of uncertain affinities, although this would not become the common consensus for some time due to a lack of well preserved fossil material. Alongside this, Shaanxilithes was also occasionally synonymized or assigned to Gaojiashania, owing to the similar preservations and range of taphonomic variations of the fossils.

This all came to a head in 2021, when new material was finally found in the Suyukou and Quanjishan sections in China, not only turning up six different preservational types of across different specimens of Shaanxilithes in a small area, but also said modes of preservation appearing on singular specimens as well, showing that all the six modes of preservation are of the same genus. This would also discount any previous attempts to synonymise Shaanxilithes to other modular or tubular genera, such as Gaojiashania and Nenoxites. From this, it was noted in the 2021 study that Shaanxilithes bear similarities to the cloudinids, such as Cloudina and Conotubus, due to its slender and funnel-in-funnel internal tube, as well as its annulated outer tube and the varying taphonomic morphologies.

A 2023 study done on traces fossils and Nenoxites material from the Khatyspyt Formation had found that the trace fossils where actually Shaanxilithes-like body fossils, although bore more similarities to Nenoxites, assigning the re-described material as such. This would then lead the researchers to note that Shaanxilithes and Nenoxites bear many similarities to each other, possibly representing a group of Shaanxilithes-like organisms, and pressing the need for further taxonomic studies to be undertaken. The researchers also took note of all the prior studies that tried to figure out the affinities of Shaanxilithes, and inferred that Shaanxilithes, and other Shaanxilithes-like organisms, could mostly likely be best interpreted as a total-group eumetazoan.

== Taphonomy ==
Shaanxilithes is known to have six different taphonomic modes of preservation, which are as follows:

- Discoidal modules: Individual modules from the internal tube, fully separated and flattened, usually top-down.
- Palaeopascichnus-type: Loosely integrated internal tube, with a notable disconnect between each funnel module, giving off a similar appearance to Palaeopascichnus. Was previously described as Palaeopascichnus meniscatus and Palaeopascichnus minimus
- Shaanxilithes erodus-type: Tightly integrated internal tube, with no visible disconnect between each funnel module, although the top edge of each funnel is still visible. Was originally described as its own species in 1986.
- Helanoichnus-type A: Tightly integrated internal tube, with parts of the external tube preserved obscuring the internal tube, although this is notably smooth in appearance. Was previously described as Helanoichnus helanensis in 1985.
- Helanoichnus-type B: Tightly integrated internal tube, with a fully preserved but decayed external tube, that is again notably smooth in appearance. Was previously described as Parascalarituba ningxiaensis in 1985.
- Shaanxilithes ningqiangensis-type: Tightly integrated internal tube, with a fully preserved external tube that bears the dense annulations.

Commonly, Shaanxilithes is preserved as a flattened, ribbon-like fossil on the surfaces of siliciclastic rocks, resulting in little to no three dimensional fossils being found. Alongside this, the more decayed the external annulated tube becomes, the more curved and disarticulated the internal tube becomes, until fully collapsing into the separated discoidal modules.

== Distribution ==
Shaanxilithes has a notably wide distribution in Asia, including records in other continents such as Africa, although its temporal range is considerably small. Due to this, it has been considered and used as an index fossil in areas it has been found, helping to date formations above and below what is referred to as the "Shaanxilithes zone".

As for where it can be found, Shaanxilithes is of course found in its type locality in the Gaojiashan Member of the Dengying Formation in South China, including the Jiucheng Member of the Denying Formation in the Yunnan Province of Southwestern China. It has also been found in other formations across China outside of the Dengying Formation, such as the Dongpo Formation in Central China, the Taozichong Formation in Southwestern China, as well as in North China, from the Zhengmuguan Formation in Ningxia, to the Zhoujieshan Formation in the Qaidam Basin.

Alongside this, Shaanxilithes has also been found outside of China, such as in Nuuchchalakh locality of the Siberian Platform, the Shaliyan Formation in India, and the Zaris sub-basin in Namibia.

Tentative records of Shaanxilithes have also been recovered from the Cambrian aged Xidashan Formation in Xinjiang. Shaanxilithes was previously recorded from the Khatyspyt Formation in Siberia, although a later study would see this material be assigned to Nenoxites.
