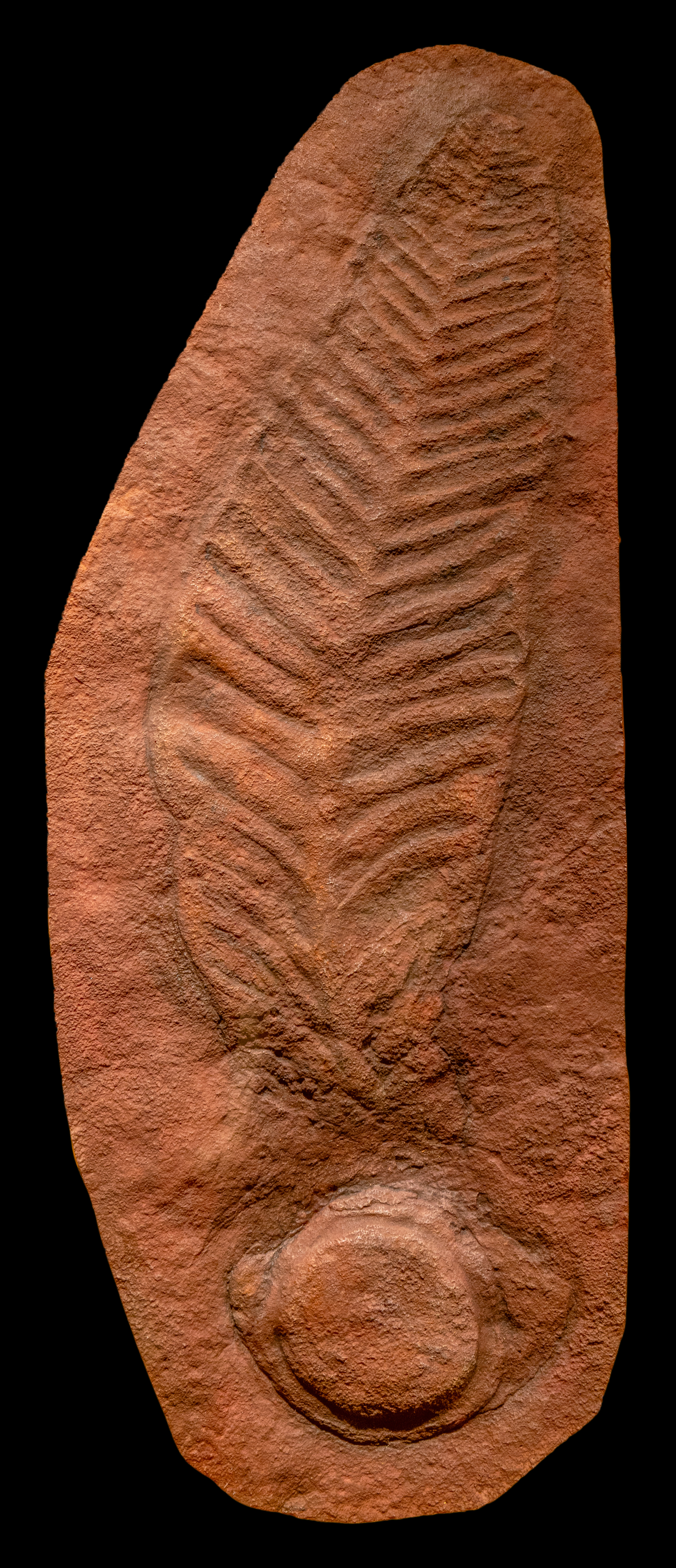
- Arborea arborea

Scientific classification
- Kingdom: Animalia
- Phylum: †Petalonamae
- Class: †Arboreomorpha; Erwin et al., 2011

Genera
- †Arborea; †Akrophyllas; †Charniodiscus; †Khatyspytia; †Vaizitsinia

= Arboreomorph =

Arboreomorph Temporal range: Ediacaran

Extinct class of animals

The arboreomorphs (Arboreomorpha) are ediacaran organisms of the frondomorph type that had a disk or bulb-shaped anchor on the ocean floor, a central stem and branching. The "branches" were smooth, tubular structures, often swollen with bifurcation and connected together to form a leaf-like structure. It was previously included within Rangeomorpha, but later removed when more related forms were found.
