= Curviacus =

Curviacus Temporal range: Late Ediacaran ~551–541 Ma

Scientific classification
- Domain: Eukaryota
- Kingdom: incertae sedis
- Informal group: †Palaeopascichnida
- Genus: †Curviacus; Shen et al., 2017
- Species: †C. ediacaranus

Binomial name
- †Curviacus ediacaranus Shen et al., 2017

Ediacaran fossil

Curviacus is a genus of Ediacaran organism of uncertain lineage that displays a modular body plan consisting of crescent-shaped chambers. It contains a single species, Curviacus ediacaranus.

== Etymology ==
The genus name Curviacus references the shape of the crescent chambers; coming from Latin curvus meaning curved and acus meaning needle.

== Description ==
These fossils occur on bituminous limestone on the bedding surface. The fossilized specimen has calcispar walls with the inner chambers filled with micrite. The walls are raised because the calcispar does not erode as easily. C. ediacaranus is a slightly oblong macrofossil that ranges from 5–14 cm in length. It is characterized by its curved or crescent-shaped chambers that occur arranged in a series with the chambers sharing walls. All of the chambers are convex in the same direction. Each chamber is narrow ranging ~1-3mm in width. Chamber length can be consistent or inconsistent. Inconsistencies can give a false impression of branching. Additionally, the walls of the chambers sometimes converge laterally.

== Phylogeny ==
The phylogeny of this fossil is not yet known. Some scientists believe the genus to be a coralline algal or fungal stem group.

== Occurrence ==
C. ediacaranus is from the late Ediacaran. The fossil C. ediacaranus has been found in the Shibantan Member of the Dengying Formation. The Shibantan Member is the bituminous limestone section of the formation. It is unusual for Ediacaran biota to be preserved in limestone. As such, C. ediacaranus is the only Palaeopascichnus fossil to be reported from carbonate rock rather than siliclastic rock. This special type of fossilization allows for 3-dimensional analysis.
