= Khatyspytia =

Khatyspytia Temporal range: late Ediacaran ~543 Ma

Scientific classification
- Kingdom: Animalia
- Phylum: †Petalonamae
- Class: †Arboreomorpha
- Genus: †Khatyspytia; Fedonkin, 1985
- Species: †K. grandis

Binomial name
- †Khatyspytia grandis Fedonkin, 1985

Genus of rangeomorphs

Khatyspytia is an extinct petalonamid from the late Ediacaran of Russia. It is a monotypic genus, containing only Khatyspytia grandis.

== Discovery and naming ==
The first fossil specimens of Khatyspytia were found from the Khatyspyt Formation of the Khorbusuonka Group in Siberia, and formally described and named in 1985.

The generic name Khatyspytia derives from the Latinised place name of the Khatyspyt Formation, from where the first fossils were found. The generic name grandis directly derives from the Latin word of the same spelling, "grandis", to mean "large".

== Description ==
Khatyspytia grandis is a tall, frondose organism, reaching up to 24 cm (9.4 in) in height. It has a notably elongated stalk, with a relatively slender frond, and a wide holdfast structure.

It has been compared to Charniodiscus, another arboreomorph, with some papers suggesting it to be a junior synonym of the species C. procerus, although nothing has been properly published on this matter. Erwin et al. (2011) would remove Khatyspytia from their analysis of the classification of major Ediacaran taxa, alongside a long list of other removed genera, with it being noted that fossils where removed due to either being exceedingly rare, poorly described, synonymized, or likely parts of a larger fossil.

== See also ==
- List of Ediacaran genera
