= Dongpo Formation =

Geologic formation in Henan, China

- Stratigraphic range: late Ediacaran; ~550–538.8 Ma
- Type: Formation
- Underlies: Xinji Formation
- Overlies: Luoquan Formation
- Thickness: 86.5 m (284 ft)

Lithology
- Primary: Shale
- Other: Siltstone, Sandstone

Location
- Region: Henan
- Country: China

The Dongpo Formation is a late Ediacaran aged geologic formation in the Henan Province of Central China. It is also fossiliferous in nature, containing fossils which date it to the Nama assemblage.

== Geology ==
The Dongpo Formation can be found within the North China Craton, currently amongst the oldest known cratons in the world, alongside its southern edge. The formation itself is primarily composed of yellowish-green shale, siltstone, and fine-grained sandstone.

It is unconformably overlain by the sandstone Cambrian aged Xinji Formation, meanwhile it is conformably underlain by the older glacial Luoquan Formation.

== Paleobiota ==
The formation is dominated by macroalgae forms, like Glomulus, alongside tubular forms such as Wutubus and Shaanxilithes. There are also some Ediacaran-type fossils, and some rare trace fossils, all of which has helped to constrain the age of the formation to the terminal Ediacaran, between 550 Ma and 538.8 Ma.

The reported frondose forms from the formation have had their biotic origins put into question, as some researchers suggest that they may actually be chevron marks produced by clasts being transported above the seabed, due to their similarity with other tool marks found in other formations, such as the Carboniferous aged Gull Island Formation in Ireland.

Color key: Taxon / Reclassified taxon / Taxon falsely reported as present / Dubious taxon or junior synonym / Ichnotaxon / Ootaxon / Morphotaxon

Notes
Uncertain or tentative taxa are in small text
~~crossed out~~ taxa are discredited.

=== incertae sedis ===
Genus	Species	Notes	Images
Aspidella	Aspidella sp.	Discoidal fossil.	
Horodyskia	Horodyskia sp.	Organism with the appearance of a string of beads.	
Palaeopascichnus	P. delicatus; P. linearis	Agglutinating palaeopascichnid organism.	
Orbisiana	Orbisiana sp.	Agglutinating palaeopascichnid organism.	
Vendotaenia	Vendotaenia sp.	Ribbon-like organism.	
Shaanxilithes	Shaanxilithes sp.	Tubular organism, regarded as either a junior synonym of Nenoxites, or a Cloudina-like fossil.	
Wutubus	Wutubus sp.	Tubular organism.	

=== Flora ===
Genus	Species	Notes	Images
Glomulus	Glomulus sp.	Filamentous cyanobacteria.	Line drawing of Glomulus filamentum

=== Microorganisms ===
Genus	Species	Notes	Images
Acanthomorphic acritarchs	???	Acritarchs.	

=== Ichnogenera ===
Genus	Species	Notes	Images
Archaeonassa	Archaeonassa sp.	Burrows.	

=== Undescribed ===
Genus	Species	Notes	Images
Unnamed frondose fossils	???	Slender frondose fossils, which bear some similarities with petalonamids, although poor preservation makes proper taxonomic assignment difficult. May be sedimentary markings produce by transported clasts.	

== See also ==
- Ediacaran biota
