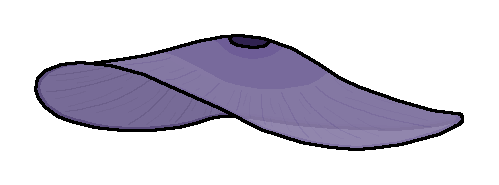
- Reconstruction of Cycliomedusa jiangchuanensis

Scientific classification
- Kingdom: Animalia
- Subkingdom: Eumetazoa
- Genus: †Cycliomedusa; Zhao et al., 2025
- Species: †C. jiangchuanensis

Binomial name
- †Cycliomedusa jiangchuanensis Zhao et al., 2025

= Cycliomedusa =

Cycliomedusa Temporal range: late Ediacaran ~550–545 Ma

Extinct genus of eumetazoan

Cycliomedusa is an extinct genus of enigmatic eumetazoan from the late Ediacaran, and is estimated to be about 550 - 545 million years old. It was first formally described in 2025 based on multiple specimens from the Dengying Formation of South China. Cycliomedusa jiangchuanensis is the only species within the genus.

== Discovery and naming ==
First informally named in 2015, and officially described in 2025, Cycliomedusa was found in the Jiucheng Member of the Dengying Formation of South China.

The generic name Cycliomedusa is derived from the Greek word "kuklios", to mean "circular"; and the Latin word "medusa", to mean "jellyfish". The specific name jiangchuanensis is derived from the place name "Jiangchuan", the county in which the Cycliomedusa fossils were found.

== Description ==
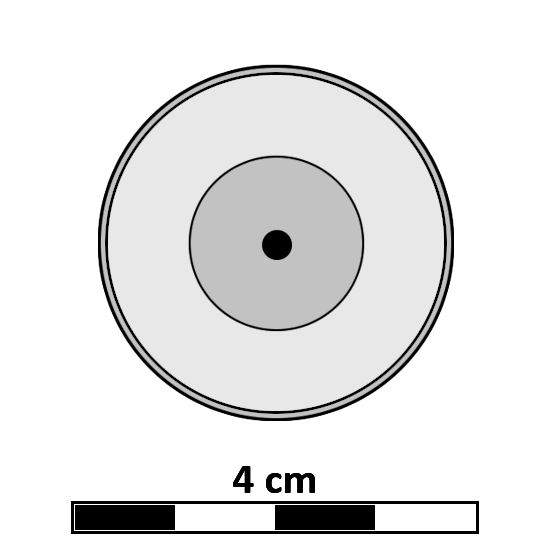
A top-down diagrammatic reconstruction of Cycliomedusa jiangchuanensis.

Cycliomedusa jiangchuanensis is a disk-shaped form, growing up to 35 mm (1.4 in) in overall diameter, and is made up of 3 main regions, the central, middle and outer ring, and is found with a light to dark-red colouration. The central area of the fossils are slightly raised, with a notable cavity in its center, which has been suggested to be an oral ring, which has a diameter of 3.3 mm (0.1 in) in the largest specimens. The middle area sits in-between the central and outer ring regions, and in a more complete specimen, it has been noted that this region features 6 straight radial cracks, which are evenly spaced apart from one another, emanating from the ring within the central region to the outer ring, although other specimens do not show this and have smooth body surfaces, suggesting that the cracks may have been caused by the drying out and tearing of the organisms. The outer ring sits at the margin of all specimens, and is tubular in nature.

Cycliomedusa is classified as an eumetazoan-grade organism of uncertain affinities. All known specimens are preserved in tidal flat sedimentary environments and feature discontinuous carbon lines along their outer margin, with most of them showing dehydration cracks on their surface. The basic morphology and central protruding, umbrella shaped region of Cycliomedusa also resemble those of cnidarians. When compared with other Ediacaran discoid forms like Aspidella, Cyclomedusa and Kullingia, it is noted that all Cycliomedusa specimens have a uniform morphology and size, whilst the hundreds of known discoid form specimens vary in both basic morphology and size, even within the same bedding planes.

== Paleoenvironment ==
Based on a multitude of factors, the known specimens of Cycliomedusa may have lived in well-lit, low-energy, tidal flat sedimentary environments. This is evidenced by the fact that most described jellyfish and/or medusoid forms are always found in association with coastal sedimentary environments, which help greatly increase the chances of these lifeforms being preserved. This is because when jellyfish become stranded, their attempts to escape cause increased sand ingestion. Dehydration and cementation of surrounding or internal sediments from fluids and bacteria also aids in preservation. All this favours the dorsal side facing upwards. There is also evidence of large benthic algae with holdfasts known from the group Longfengshaniaceae on the same bedding plane.

== Taphonomy ==
It has been noted that the protruding light to dark-red surfaces of Cycliomedusa are akin to that of Chengjiang biota fossils seen in the Maotianshan Shales, which have been suggested to be preserved through two methods, the first being dense recalcitrant tissues being preserved by compression and the formation of organic films, and then the second being that thin tissues preserving through pyritization and then being exposed as iron red films after oxidation.

Cycliomedusa may have undergone a similar process to this, with iron-oxides and ferroaluminosilicates replacing the weaker tissue material, and over time atmospheric precipitation would have infiltrated the deep weather layer, forming weak acid pore water, which would oxidise the pyrite and hydrolyse it into hematite, which would result in the final reddy colour seen in the fossil material of Cycliomedusa. Any areas of packed muscle tissues, nerves or recalcitrant integument within the central region may have also increased in thickness and proteins during this process, aiding in resisting compression and resulting in the observed relief on the central area.

== See also ==
- List of Ediacaran genera
