= Palaeopascichnida =

Palaeopascichnida Temporal range: Ediacaran ~580–542 Ma
- A fossil specimen of Palaeopascichnus, a palaeopascichnid which has now been recognised as a body fossil

Scientific classification
- Domain: Eukaryota
- (unranked): incertae sedis
- Informal group: †Palaeopascichnida; Grazhdankin & Maslov, 2009

Genera
- †Palaeopascichnus Palij, 1976; †Orbisiana Fedonkin, 1976

Group of enigmatic agglutinating organisms

Palaeopascichnida is a proposed group, which includes all known elongated, agglutinating organisms from the Ediacaran period. The term was first used in 2009 by Grazhdankin & Maslov.

== Description ==
A specimen of Orbisiana spumea

Palaeopascichnids are agglutinating organisms, which are primarily composed of globular or sausage-shaped chambers, with occasional branches seen in a majority of specimens.

They were originally described as trace fossils, but further studies found this to not be the case, due to the branching of the fossils and some also being disarticulated, with chambers found separated from the rest of the body. Some studies have even suggested a probable foraminiferan affinity for the palaeopascichnids.

== Distribution ==
Palaeopascichnids are very widespread, being found across the globe, from the East European platform (White Sea, Urals, Moscow syneclise, Podolia, Finnmark), to Siberia (Olenyok uplift, Uchur-Maya basin), South China (Lantian, Dengying ), Australia (Flinders Ranges), India (Tethys), Avalonia (Charnwood, Newfoundland and Labrador), Romania (Histria Formation), Brazil (Itajaí Basin), and Oman (Fara Formation).

== Taxonomy ==
If formalised, the group would include the following genera and species:

- Genus Palaeopascichnus Palij, 1976
  - P. delicatus Palij, 1976
  - P. linearis Fedonkin, 1976
  - P. gracilis Fedonkin, 1985
- Genus Orbisiana Sokolov, 1976
  - O. simplex Sokolov, 1976
  - O. intorta Kolesnikov & Desiatkin, 2022
  - O. spumea Kolesnikov & Desiatkin, 2022
- Genus Curviacus Shen et al., 2017
  - C. ediacaranus Shen et al., 2017

== See also ==
- List of Ediacaran genera
