= Lamonte trevallis =

Trace fossil classification
- Ichnogenus: †Lamonte

Ichnospecies
- †Lamonte trevallis Meyer, Xiao, Gill, Schiffbauer, Chen, Zhou et Yuan, 2014

Trace fossil

Lamonte trevallis is an ichnospecies from the late Ediacaran sediments of the Yangtze Gorges of Southern China. It represented fairly large traces that indicate burrowing behaviour. It had Millimetre-sized traces preserved differently than other Ichnofossils from that time period. Surface-dwelling trackways, vertical burrows and horizontal tunnels are a common characteristic of the trace fossil.

== See also ==
- List of Ediacaran genera
