= Ediacaran type preservation =

Ediacaran organisms preserved as casts on the surface of microbial mats

Ediacaran type preservation relates to the dominant preservational mode in the Ediacaran period, where Ediacaran organisms were preserved as casts on the surface of microbial mats.

== Exceptional preservation ==
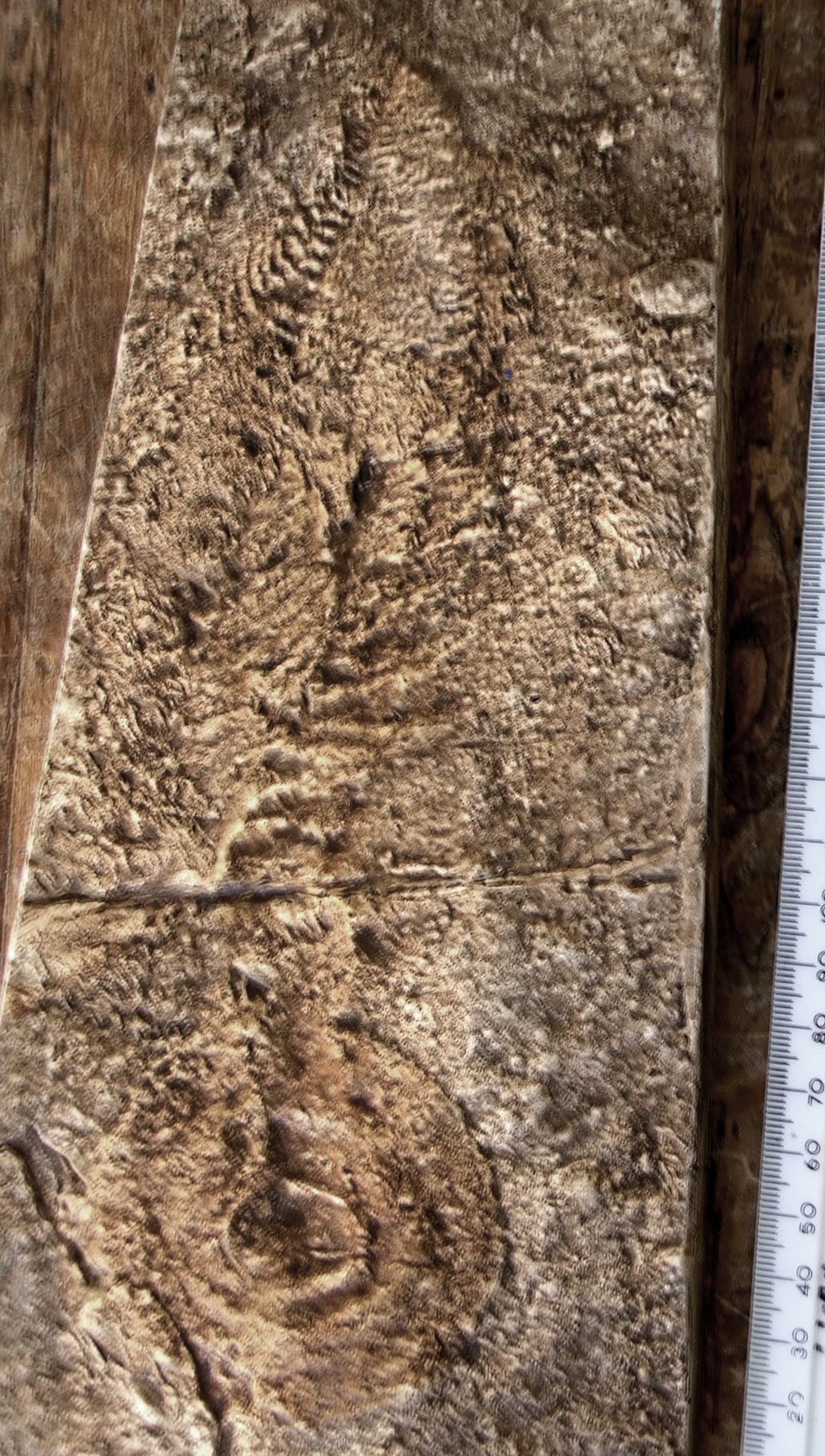
The fossil Charniodiscus is barely distinguishable from the "elephant skin" texture on this cast.

All but the smallest fraction of the fossil record consists of the robust skeletal matter of decayed corpses. Hence, since Ediacaran biota had soft bodies and no skeletons, their abundant preservation is surprising. The absence of burrowing creatures living in the sediments undoubtedly helped; since after the evolution of these organisms in the Cambrian, soft-bodied impressions were usually disturbed before they could fossilize.

== Microbial mats ==
Microbial mats are areas of sediment stabilised by the presence of colonies of microbes, which secrete sticky fluids or otherwise bind the sediment particles. They appear to migrate upwards when covered by a thin layer of sediment, but this is an illusion caused by the colony's growth; individuals do not, themselves, move. If too thick a layer of sediment is deposited before they can grow or reproduce through it, parts of the colony will die, leaving behind fossils with a characteristically wrinkled "elephant skin" texture. Most Ediacaran strata with the "elephant skin" texture characteristic of microbial mats contain fossils, and Ediacaran fossils are almost never found in beds that do not contain these microbial mats. Although microbial mats were once widespread, the evolution of grazing organisms in the Cambrian vastly reduced their numbers, and these communities are now limited to inhospitable refugia where predators cannot survive long enough to eat them.

== Fossilisation ==
The preservation of these fossils is one of their great fascinations to science. As soft-bodied organisms, they would normally not fossilise. Unlike later soft-bodied fossil biota (such as the Burgess Shale, or Solnhofen Limestone) the Ediacara biota is not found in a restricted environment subject to unusual local conditions: they were a global phenomenon. The processes that were operating must have been systemic and worldwide. There was something very different about the Ediacaran Period that permitted these delicate creatures to be left behind. It is thought that the fossils were preserved by virtue of rapid covering by ash or sand, trapping them against the mud or microbial mats on which they lived. However, it is more common to find Ediacaran fossils under sandy beds deposited by storms or high-energy, bottom-scraping ocean currents known as turbidites. Soft-bodied organisms today almost never fossilise during such events.

=== Types of preservation ===
Three different preservational modes are known:

- Flinders-style: Such as found in Ediacara, the fossils are preserved on the underside of usually coarse grained sandstone beds;
  - Fermeuse-style: A subset of Flinders-style, known from deep water only. Only trace fossils and imprints of holdfast structures are preserved; the soft tissue itself has decayed (although the sediment within the holdfasts remains);
- Conception-style: The fossils are preserved as an impression in an overlying bed of freshly fallen volcanic ash, often in exquisitely fine detail;
- Nama-style: Fossils are preserved in three dimensions, within fine-grained beds that were deposited in single storm or mudflow events.

=== Hypotheses for Flinders-style preservation ===
==== Microbial mats ====
The presence of widespread microbial mats probably aided preservation by stabilising their impressions in the sediment below, in combination with the formation of iron sulfides and pyrite to form a "death mask" mantling the organisms.

==== Rapid cementation of overlying sediment ====
Many models suggest that overlying sediment mineralized before the underlying organism decayed, causing the un-mineralized underlying sediment to fill the void after decay.

One mode of early sediment mineralization, which accounts for the occurrence of this preservational mode into the Cambrian and its increasing scarcity thereafter, is silicification: this links the preservation of the fossils to the higher silica content of oceans before sponges, diatoms and other silica sinks became widespread.

This hypothesis struggles to account for a number of observations, particularly in the Flinders and White Sea deposits; it is therefore difficult to argue that it formed a necessary component of Ediacara type preservation.

==== Sediment rheology ====
In Flinders-style preservation, the overlying sediment always has a larger grain size than the sediment layer beneath. Because sediments with smaller grain sizes are more fluid, these can be squeezed up into a void that forms as organic material begins to decay. This model, proposed by Mary Wade in 1969, has found experimental support from cardboard-containing Death Star ice cubes.

== What is preserved? ==
The rate of cementation of the overlying substrate, relative to the rate of decomposition of the organism, determines whether the top or bottom surface of an organism is preserved. Most disc-shaped fossils decomposed before the overlying sediment was cemented, and the ash or sand slumped in to fill the void, leaving a cast of the underside of the organism.

Conversely, quilted fossils tend to decompose after the cementation of the overlying sediment; hence their upper surfaces are preserved. Their more resistant nature is reflected in the fact that in rare occasions, quilted fossils are found within storm beds, the high-energy sedimentation not having destroyed them as it would have the less-resistant discs. Further, in some cases, the bacterial precipitation of minerals formed a "death mask", creating a mould of the organism.
