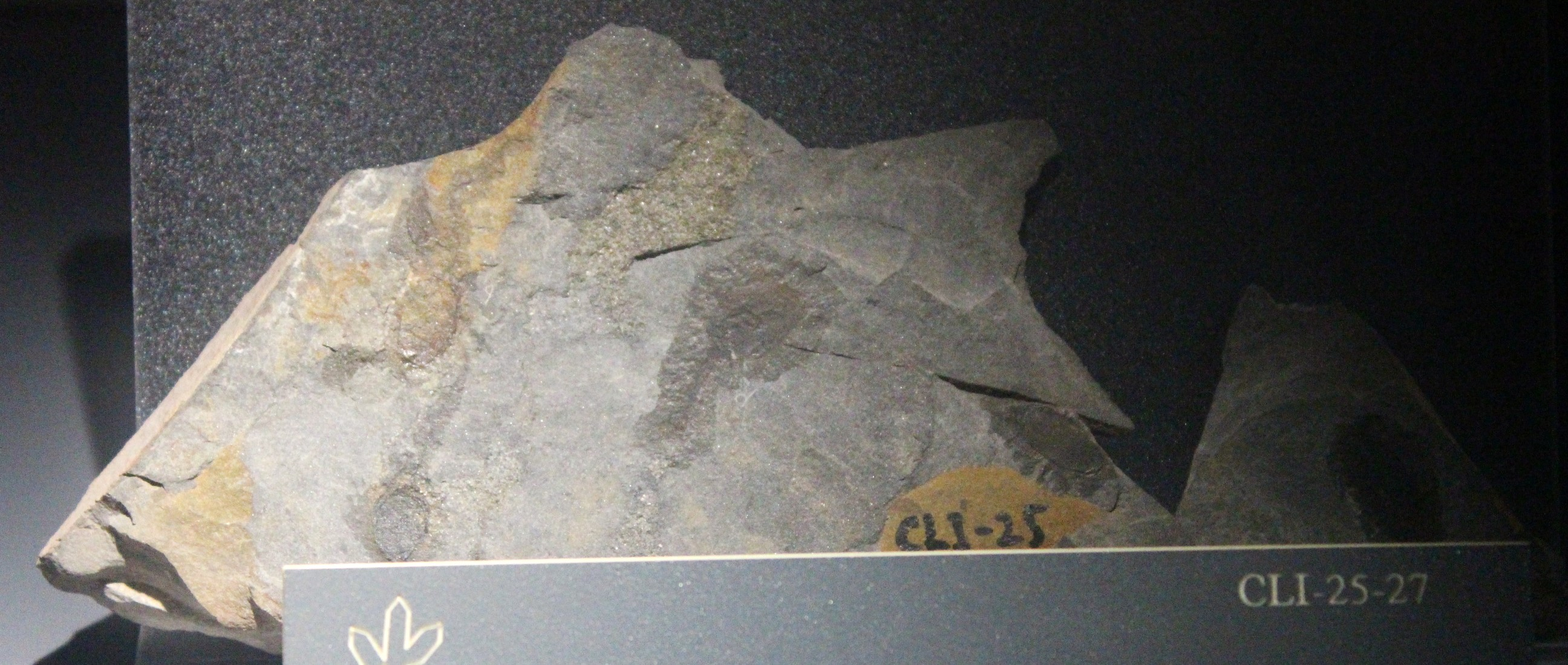
- Fossil specimen, Geological Museum of China

Scientific classification
- Domain: Eukaryota
- Clade: incertae sedis
- Genus: †Tawuia; Hofmann, 1979

Type species
- †Tawuia dalensis Hofmann, 1979

Species
- †Tawuia dalensis Hofmann, 1979; †Tawuia robusta Qin et al., 2023; †Tawuia sinensis Duan, 1982

= Tawuia =

Tawuia Temporal range: Statherian to Cambrian Stage 3, 1632–518 Ma

Enigmatic genus of prehistoric eukaryotes

Tawuia is a millimetric disc or sausage-shaped, most likely multicellular (although coenocytic), macrofossil from the Proterozoic. Stratigraphically, they range from around 1,630 million years ago to the early Cambrian.

The fossils are often preserved as organic compressions. They are sometimes considered to represent microbial structures; some authors affiliate them with slime molds. However, Tawuia is instead likely an alga, as sub-cellular structures supporting this have been preserved.

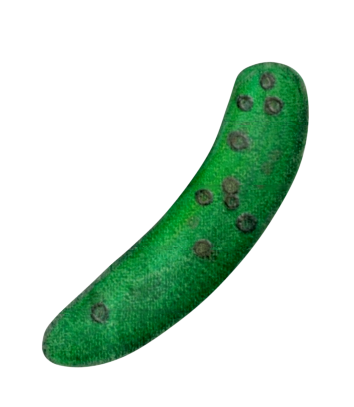
Reconstruction of Tawuia as a coenocytic macroalgae with epibionts.

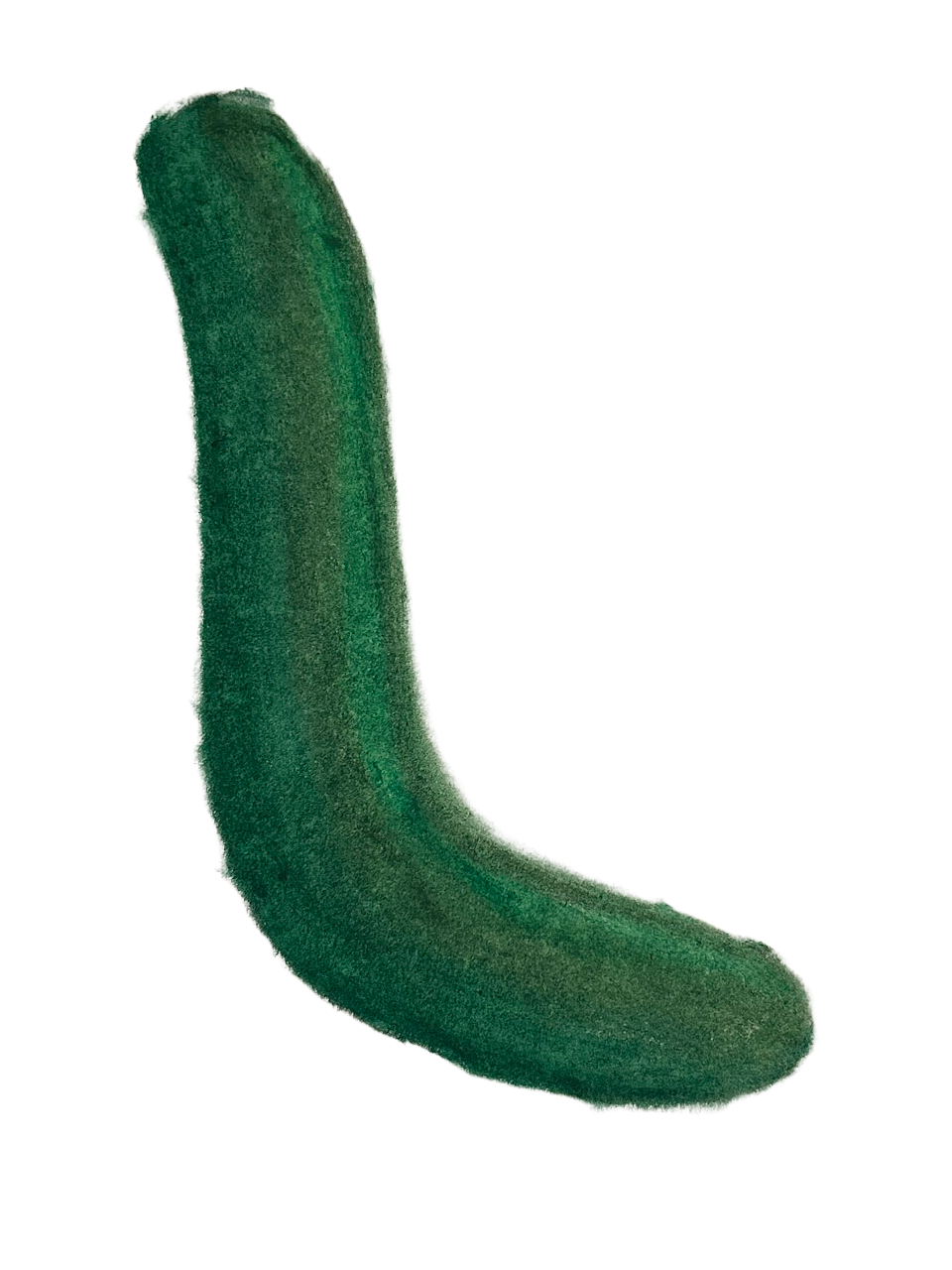
Reconstruction of Tawuia as a coenocytic macroalgae lacking epibionts

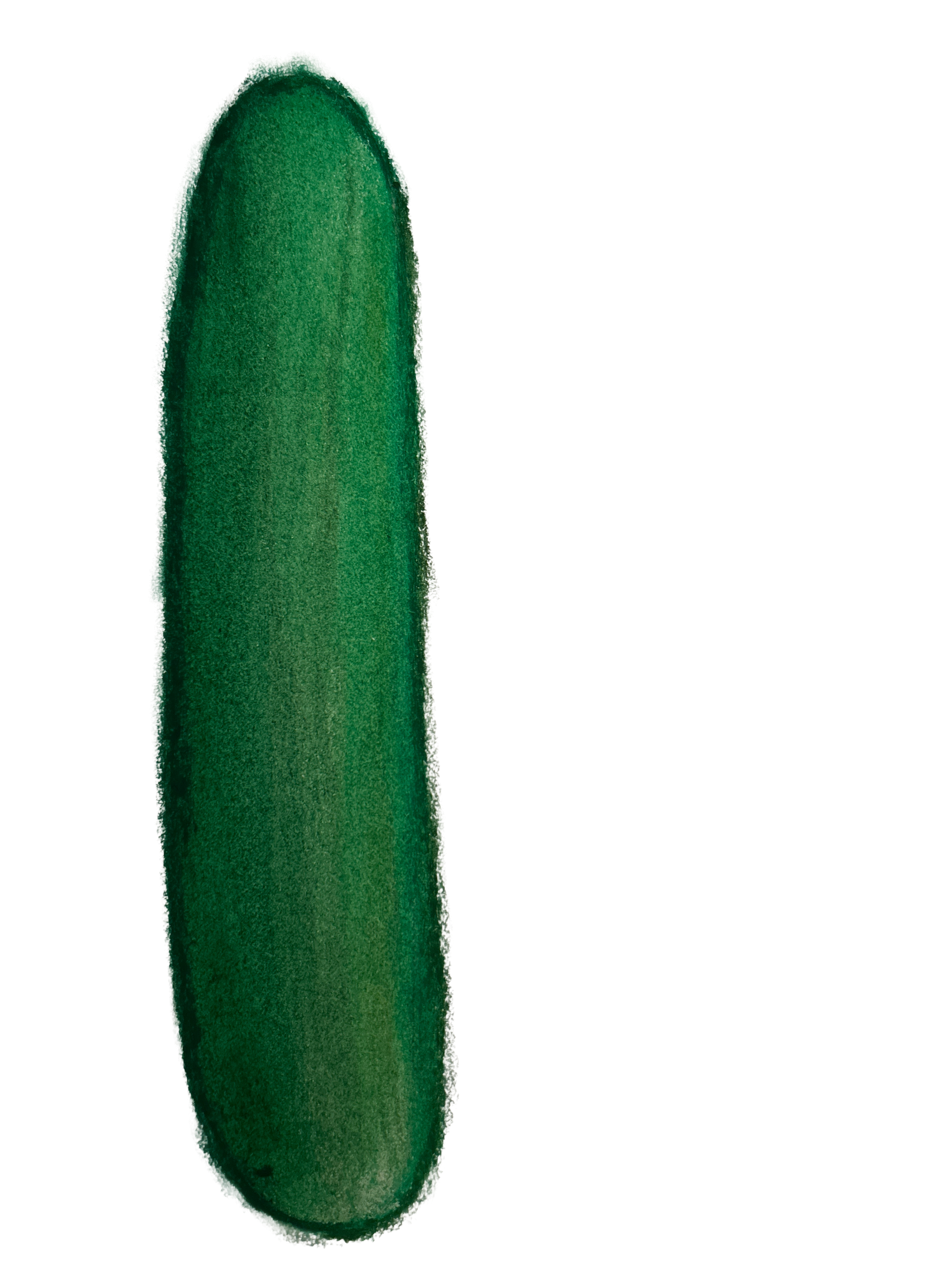
Reconstruction of Tawuia sinensis as a coenocytic macroalgae lacking epibionts

== See also ==
- Longfengshania
