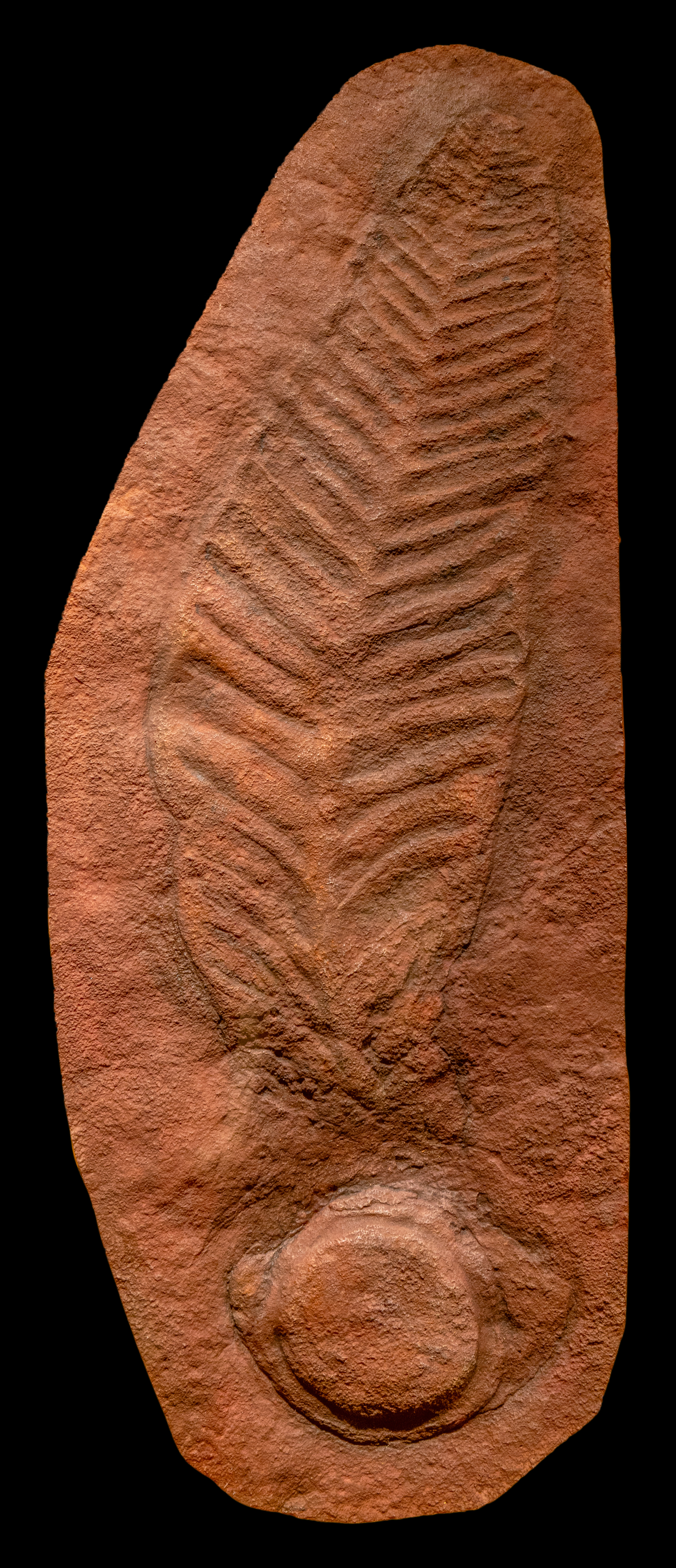
- Charniodiscus arboreus (=Arborea arborea)

Scientific classification
- Kingdom: Animalia
- Phylum: †Petalonamae
- Class: †Arboreomorpha
- Genus: †Arborea; Glaessner et Wade, 1966

Type species
- †Rangea arborea Glaessner, 1959

Species
- †Arborea arborea (Glaessner, 1959); †Arborea denticulata Wang et al., 2020; †Arborea elegans Rosse-Guillevic, Olschewski & McIlroy, 2026; †Arborea opposita (Jenkins et Gehling, 1978); †Arborea spinosa (LaFlamme et al., 2004)

= Arborea (genus) =

Arborea Temporal range: Ediacaran

Genus of extinct Ediacaran lifeform

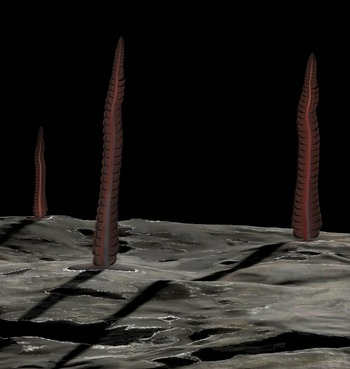
3D reconstruction of Arborea elegans

Arborea is a genus of petalonamid that was formerly considered as being synonymous with Charniodiscus. It consisted of a frond-like body 3–4 inches (7.6–10.2 cm) long that was attached to the substrate via a holdfast that possessed many concentric rings on it. Species which were thought to have been within the genus Charniodiscus are now being interpreted as belonging to the genus Arborea with the latter of which being considered synonymous with Charniodiscus. A. arborea was first described from South Australia, and is the most abundant petalonamid in the Flinders Ranges. The genus currently contains five known species with three of them originally being species of Charniodiscus; the species include A. arborea, A. denticulata, A. opposita and A. spinosa. The fifth species, A. elegans, was found in the Mistaken Point Formation and was named in 2026. The formerly included species A. longa was in 2023 transferred to its own genus, Akrophyllas.

== See also ==
- List of Ediacaran genera
