= Palaeopascichnus =

Palaeopascichnus Temporal range: late Ediacaran ~580–542 Ma

Scientific classification
- Domain: Eukaryota
- Informal group: †Palaeopascichnida
- Genus: †Palaeopascichnus; Palij, 1976

Type species
- †Palaeopascichnus delicatus Palij, 1976

Species
- P. delicatus Palij, 1976; P. linearis Fedonkin, 1976; P. gracilis Fedonkin, 1985

Synonyms
- Inrites Fedonkin, 1980; Yelovichnus Fedonkin, 1985; Catellichnus Becker, 1989; Iterichnus Becker, 2013; Pseudobergaueria Becker, 2013; Orbisiana Sokolov, 1976; Orbisiana linearis Chen, 1994; Seirisphaera Chen, 1994; Catenasphaerophyton Yan et al., 1992

Enigmatic agglutinating organism from the Ediacaran

Palaeopascichnus is an enigmatic form from the Ediacaran, consisting of a series of lobes. It was originally considered a trace fossil, but further research found it to be a body fossil, being the skeletal remains of an agglutinating organism.

== Discovery and naming ==
The first fossil material of Palaeopascichnus was found in the Studenitsa Formation, Podolia in Ukraine, and named in 1976, and has since been found from formations from across the globe.

The generic name Palaeopascichnus derives from the Greek word "paleo", to mean "old"; the Latin word "pasco", to mean "graze"; and the Greek word "ichnos", to mean "trace", in line with the naming conventions of other ichnotaxon. Combined, it would translate to "Old grazing trace".

== Description ==
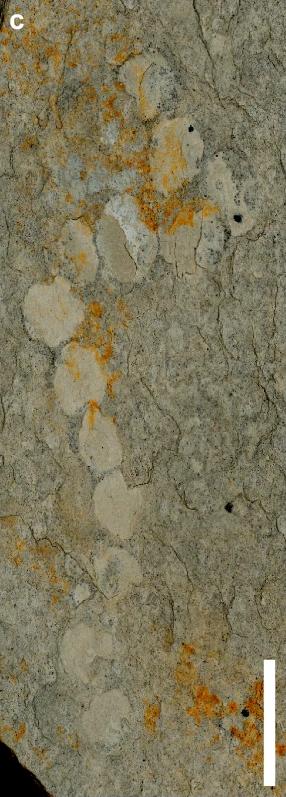
P. linearis specimen from the Tongshan Lagerstätte in the Dengying Formation, China

Palaeopascichnus is an agglutinating organism, consisting of curved lobe-like modules, which number up to forty in larger specimens. There are two known module morphologies, "Globular" and "Ellipsoidal". Globular modules can get up to 5 mm (0.2 in) in diameter, whilst ellipsoidal modules can get up to 5 mm (0.2 in) in length, and up to 15 mm (0.6 in) in width, and in either morphology, the modules gradually increase in size from the origin point. The modules are also spaced a part from each other by 0.5–1 mm (0.0–0.0 in), although this has been noted to possibly be a result of post-mortem degradation of organic material. The modules make up a larger body, which is usually linear in structure, with occasional diverging branches, and gets up to 20 cm (7.9 in) in length. The modules that make up this body were noted to be loosely connected to each other, due to some fossil specimens showing disarticulation, with the modules being carried away from the main body.

== Affinities ==
When described, Palaeopascichnus was originally referred to as an trace fossil of another organism, which was upheld by a number of further studies. One study suggested it to be a macrophyte, due to the fact that in further descriptions of Palaeopascichnus, it was noted that branching was not possible in trace fossils, something that was being found increasingly in new specimens.

More studies later put forward the interpretation that Palaeopascichnus may be a protist, with probably affinities with foraminifers. One study supported the forminiferan affinity of Palaeopascichnus, but noted that it may also be a synonym of Horodyskia. Another study done supported the suggestion that fossils of Palaeopascichnus represented an encrusting benthic organism, although did not agree with the foraminiferal affinities, or the agglutinating structure.

This all finally came to a head in 2018, when new material was found that showed that Palaeopascichnus was indeed an agglutinating organism, and that all prior fossils found were in fact body fossils, and supports the possibly of a foraminiferan affinity, although may closely related.

== Taphonomy ==
Due to the wide range of Palaeopascichnus, it also has a wide range of preservation modes, which are as follows:

- Positive relief: This is where the fossil is protruding from the rock as a cast. This is the original preservation that Palaeopascichnus was found in, and is the most common preservation mode.
- Negative relief: This is where the fossils are only an impression in the rock.
- Full relief: This is where the fossil has both positive and negative relief preservation, resulting in some parts protruding from the rock, and some parts only being impressions in the rock.
- Carbonaceous: This is where biogenic markings are left behind on the rock after being buried, with the markings being notably darker than the surrounding matrix.
- Calcareous: This is where the fossil material is of the same material as the surrounding matrix, with each module bearing a noticeably darker margin, which sometimes covers the entire module, that is made of a much coarser material. This outer rim may represent the original structure made by the organism before burial, with each chamber being in-filled during and after burial.

== Distribution ==
Palaeopascichnus has a very wide distribution, being commonly found across the entire East European Platform (Finnmark, the Baltic Shield, White Sea, Moscow and Mezen Basins, Ural Mountains, Podolia). They can also been found in South China, Siberia, the Adelaide Superbasin in Australia, as well as some parts of Avalonia (Newfoundland and Labrador, and Wales), Brazil, Oman, and Romania.

== See also ==
- List of Ediacaran genera
- Palaeopascichnid
