= Khatyspyt Formation =

Geological formation

- Stratigraphic range: Neoproterozoic
- Type: Geological formation
- Unit of: Olenëk Uplift
- Underlies: Turkut Formation
- Overlies: Mastakh Formation

Location
- Location: Siberia

The Khatyspyt Formation is a Neoproterozoic formation exposed in the Olenëk Uplift of north central Siberia, which contains the only known instance of the Ediacara biota preserved in a limestone bed. The Khatyspyt Formation forms one of the major parts of the Khorbusuonka Group; underlying the Khatyspyt are dolomites of the Mastakh Formation and their overlying red beds; the Turkut Formation overlies the Khatyspyt. The Khatyspyt and part of the overlying Turkut comprise a major shallowing upward marine carbonate sequence. Khatyspytia is named after this formation.
