= Bituminous limestone =

Bituminous limestone is limestone impregnated and sometimes deeply colored with bituminous matter derived from the decomposition of animal and plant remains entombed within the mass or in its vicinity.

== Uses ==
The amount of bituminous matter or asphalt in the pores of the rock is sometimes sufficient to permit the material being used for asphalt pavements after simply powdering and heating it. Still better results are obtained by mixing it with bituminous sandstone.

== Sources ==
In the United States, bituminous limestone has been found in Oklahoma, Texas, and Utah. Much bituminous limestone was also mined in Germany, Switzerland, and France, from where large quantities of it were exported to the United States.
