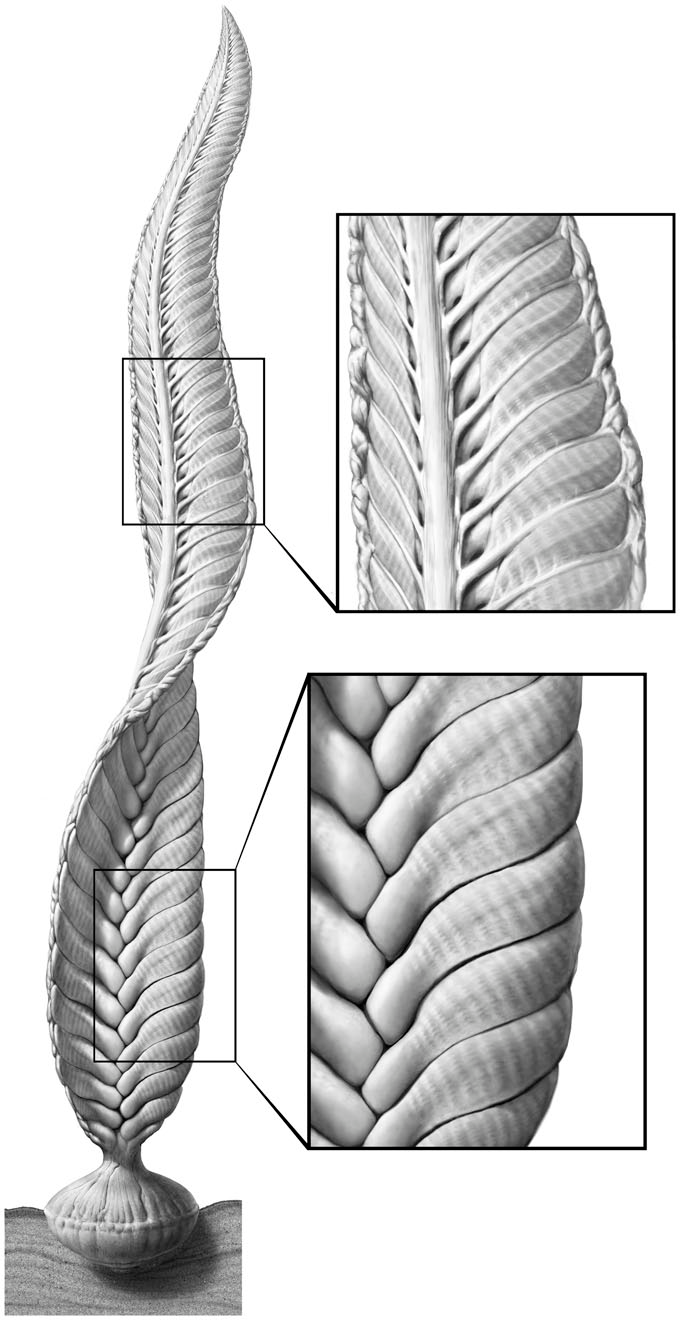
- Reconstruction of Akrophyllas longa, including close-ups of its branches.

Scientific classification
- Kingdom: Animalia
- Phylum: †Petalonamae
- Class: †Arboreomorpha
- Genus: †Akrophyllas; Grimes et al., 2023
- Species: †A. longa

Binomial name
- †Akrophyllas longa (Glaessner and Wade, 1966)

Synonyms
- Rangea longa Glaessner and Wade, 1966

= Akrophyllas =

Akrophyllas Temporal range: Late Ediacaran 555 Ma

Body fossil

Akrophyllas is an extinct genus from the late Ediacaran of the Flinders Ranges in Australia. It is a monotypic genus, containing only Akrophyllas longa. It has a long and complicated taxonomic history, being assigned to Rangea, Charnia and Glaessnerina, as well as being compared to Trepassia and Paracharnia.

== Discovery ==
Fossil material of Akrophyllas was found from the Ediacara Member of the Rawnsley Quartzite, in Nilpena Ediacara National Park, Flinders Ranges of South Australia in 1956 and originally described in 1966 as Rangea longa, but was redescribed and renamed in 2023.

== Etymology ==
The generic name Akrophyllas derives from the Greek word "Akros", to mean "at the top", in reference to its preservation on the top of the sandstone beds the fossils are known from; and the word "Phyllas", to mean "leaf", due to the appearance of the organism itself. The specific name longa is kept from its original description, and directly derives from the Latin word "longa", to mean "long".

Combined, the full name is translated to "Long leaf at the top".

== Description ==
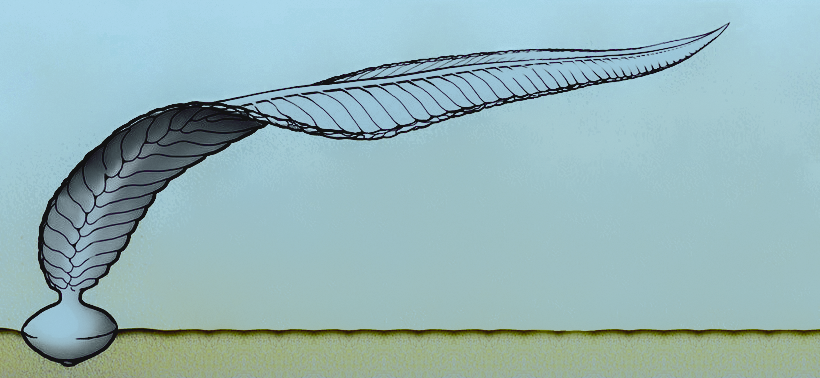
Artist's reconstruction of A. longa.

Akrophyllas longa is a elongated frondose organism, growing up to 15 cm (5.9 in) in length, and a tapering width that goes from 61–45 mm (2.4–1.8 in). The body itself contains a notable central stalk, up to 17 mm (0.7 in) at its widest, with clear rectangular to sigmoidal first-order branches on either side, and due to the fine sandstone preservation, these branches have been noted to contain second and third-order branches also. There are also several fossils which display either side of the organism, with one said, the "front", showing the full stalk, whilst the other side, the "back", does not show the stalk, and only shows the first-order branches interlocking in a zig-zag pattern down the middle. Only a few fossils preserve a holdfast structure, which is not measured.

The first-order branches can get up to 30 mm (1.2 in) in length and 10 mm (0.4 in) in width. Within these, the second-order branches only get up to 2 mm (0.1 in) in width, whilst the third-order branches are unmeasurable, they are noted to be submillimetre in width. The larger first-order branches all slightly overlap each other at the outward ends, which also met up with a notable marginal rim. The marginal rim itself can be found going along the entire margin of the frond, and is beaded in appearance, although this beading becomes smoother at the very top.

== Affinities ==
When it was first described in 1966, it was originally assigned to the genus Rangea as R. longa, due to the fact that when the fossils were found in 1956, the only frondose organism known was Rangea, with Charnia being described two years alter in 1958. In fact, fossil material from another section of the Rawnsley Quartzite were described a few years prior to R. longa in 1962 as a species of Charnia,. In 1973, both of these would be redescribed as a species of Glaessnerina (Now a junior synonym of Charnia), as G. grandis.

And then, in 2023, with another redescription of all this material from the Rawnsley Quartzite as a whole, it was found that the material attributed to these genera, now Akrophyllas, were not entirely of rangeomorph construction. Rangea is known to have a hexaradial symmetry, with six vanes coming out of a central stalk, all with a sheet that features unfurled rangeomorph branches, all of which is absent from Akrophyllas. And whilst Charnia is similar to Akrophyllas in the appearance of the "backside", the structure of the branches differs greatly from any known Charnia species. Alongside this Akrophyllas also features a stalk, something that is also not seen in Charnia. And of course, Glaessnerina was later synonymised into Charnia. Comparisons have also been made with Trepassia and Paracharnia, although again Akrophyllas differs from both, where unlike Trepassia it has a marginal rim, and a differing branch structure, and unlike Paracharnia it doesn't have a very wide central stalk and tiny branches.

In this new redescription, it was found that the material more resembles that of an arboreomorph. Arboreomorphs are known to have rectangular to sigmoidal first-order branches coming off from a thin central stalk, which contain second and third-order branches. They also feature a notable "front" and "back", although the stalk is at least partially visible on either side. Most of these features had been found within Akrophyllas, but the complete lack of a visible stalk on the "backside" of the fossils made assignment difficult, and was noted to be similar to a rangeomorph, and may have contributed to the back and forth redescriptions, reassignments and debates since the original description in 1966. Either way, the researchers of the 2023 redescription consider that Akrophyllas could show that the arboreomorphs and rangeomorphs are more closely related than originally thought, or than certain features seen across all the Petalonamae classes are actually convergent. Although at the time it was still assigned to the Arboreomorpha, but it was noted that more research was required to figure out the relation between the three petalonamid classes.

== See also ==
- List of Ediacaran genera
