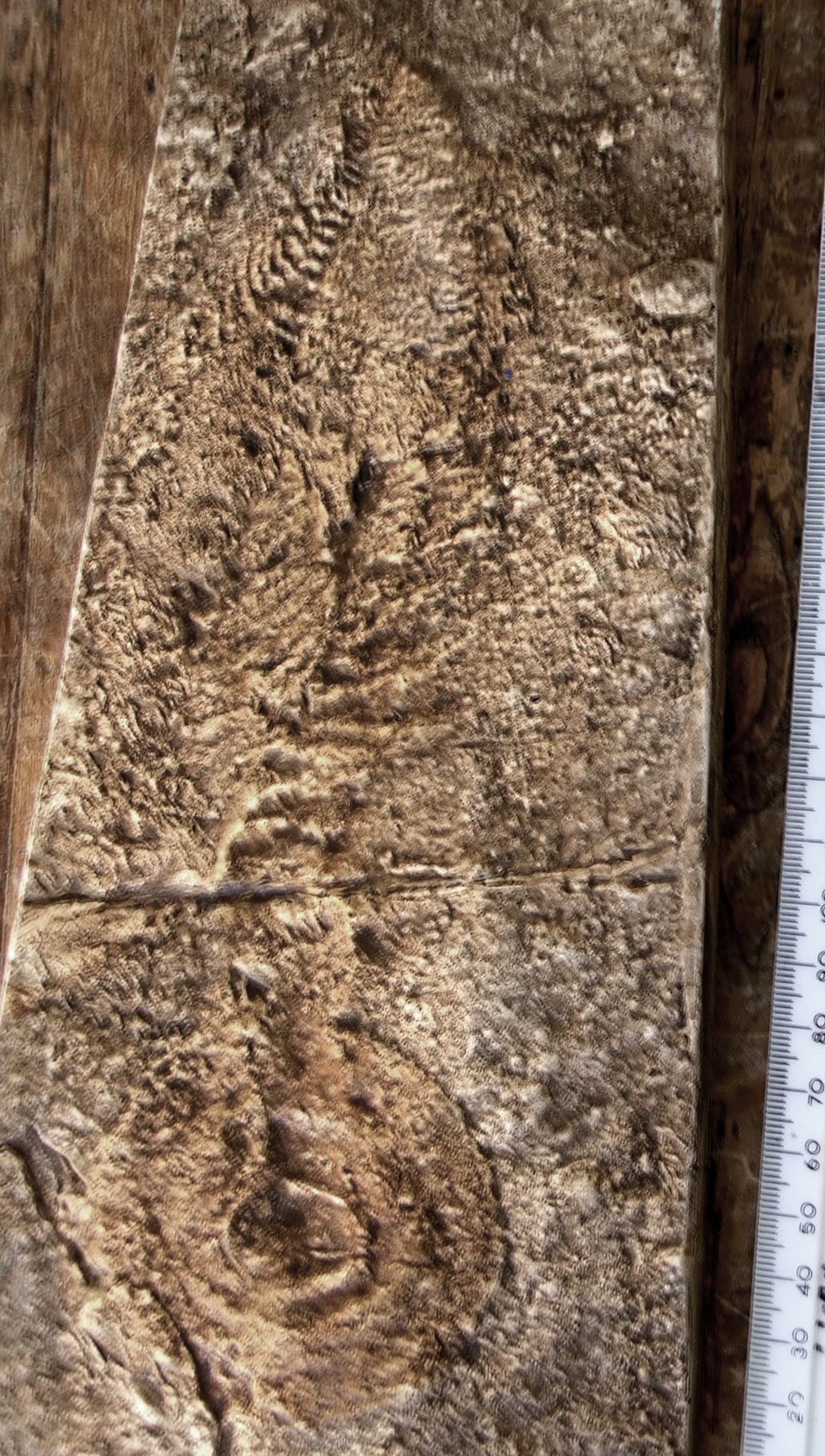
- A cast of Charniodiscus concentricus taken from Charnwood Forest, England
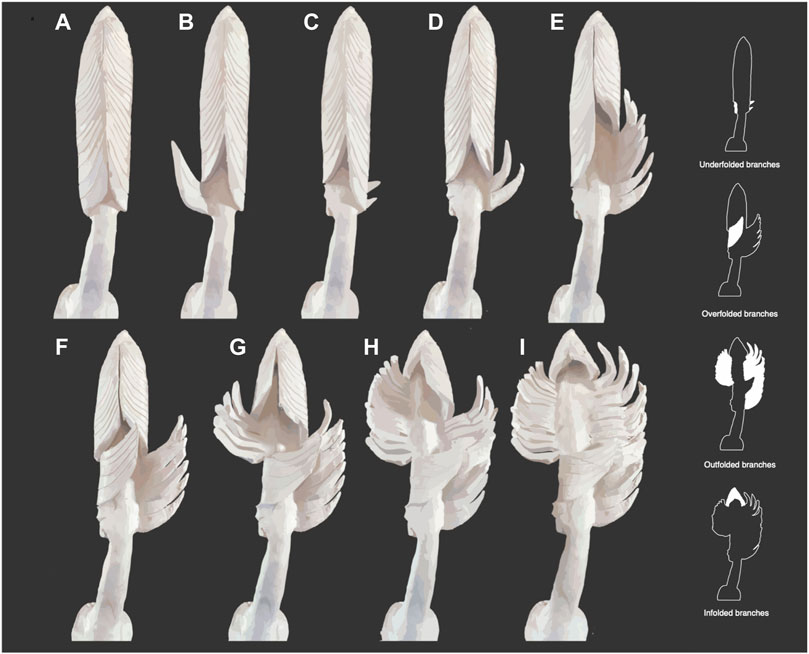
- Taphonomic stop-motion model of C. concentricus

Scientific classification
- Kingdom: Animalia
- Phylum: †Petalonamae
- Class: †Arboreomorpha
- Genus: †Charniodiscus; Ford, 1958

Species
- C. concentricus Ford, 1958 (type species); C. procerus LaFlamme et al., 2004; C. yorgensis? Borchvardt et Nessov, 1999

= Charniodiscus =

Charniodiscus Temporal range: Ediacaran, 565–550.78 Ma

Genus of extinct Ediacaran lifeform

Charniodiscus is an Ediacaran fossil that in life was probably a stationary filter feeder that lived anchored to a sandy sea bed. The organism had a holdfast, stalk and frond. The holdfast was bulbous shaped, and the stalk was flexible. The frond was segmented and had a pointed tip. There were two growth forms: one with a short stem and a wide frond, and another with a long stalk, elevating a smaller frond about 50 centimetres (20 in) above the holdfast. While the organism superficially resembles the sea pens (cnidaria), it is probably not a crown-group animal.

Charniodiscus was first found in Charnwood Forest in England, and named by Trevor D. Ford in 1958. The name is derived from the fact that Ford described a holdfast consisting only of a double concentric circle, his species being named Charniodiscus concentricus. Later it was discovered that a frond (Charnia masoni) was part of a closely related organism. Charnia differs in the branching structure in the frond.

Charniodiscus specimens are known from across the globe dating to around 565 to 550 million years ago.

Species are distinguished by the number of segments, the presence or absence of distal spines, and by shape ratios.

The former species C. arboreus, C. oppositus, and C. spinosus are considered to belong to their own genus Arborea, which was formerly treated as a synonym of Charniodiscus. Another former species, C. longus, was in 2023 transferred to its own genus, Akrophyllas. The status of C. yorgensis needs to be restudied.

== See also ==
- List of Ediacaran genera
