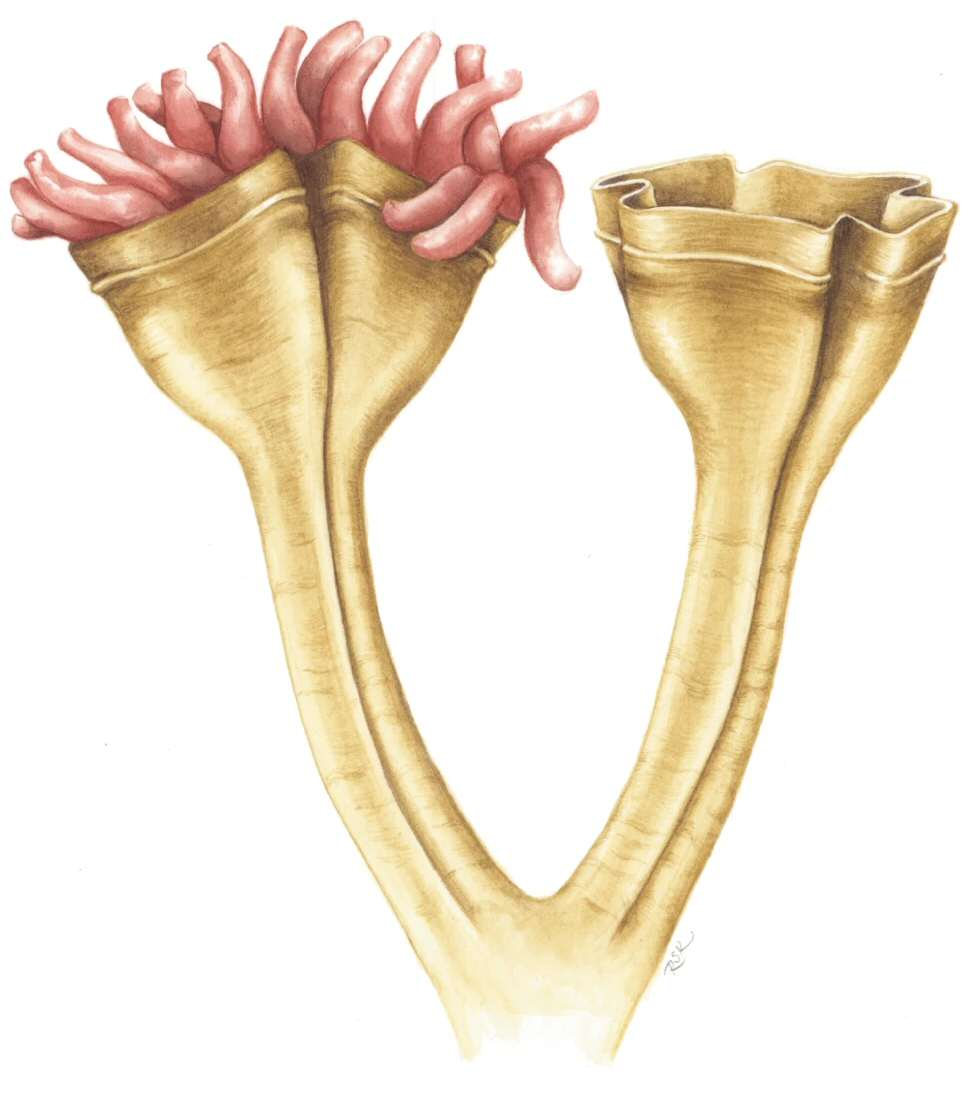
- Reconstruction of Auroralumina attenboroughii

Scientific classification
- Kingdom: Animalia
- Phylum: Cnidaria
- Subphylum: Medusozoa
- Genus: †Auroralumina; Dunn et al., 2022
- Species: †A. attenboroughii

Binomial name
- †Auroralumina attenboroughii Dunn et al., 2022

= Auroralumina =

Auroralumina Temporal range: late Ediacaran ~562–557 Ma

Extinct species of cnidarian

Auroralumina is an extinct genus of cnidarian from the late Ediacaran of Leicestershire. It is a monotypic genus, containing only Auroralumina attenboroughii. It is currently the earliest known crown group cnidarian known, as well as potentially being the earliest known animal predator.

== Discovery and naming ==
The holotype fossil of Auroralumina was found in the Bradgate Formation of the Maplewell Group in the Charnwood Forest, Leicestershire, United Kingdom in 2007, and was formally described and named in 2022.

The generic name Auroralumina derives from the Latin words "Aurora", to mean dawn, in reference to the age of the organism; and "lumina", to mean light, in reference to the torch-like appearance of the organism itself. The specific name attenboroughii is in honour of Sir David Attenborough, due to his work in raising the awareness of Ediacaran fossils in the Charnwood Forest.

== Description ==
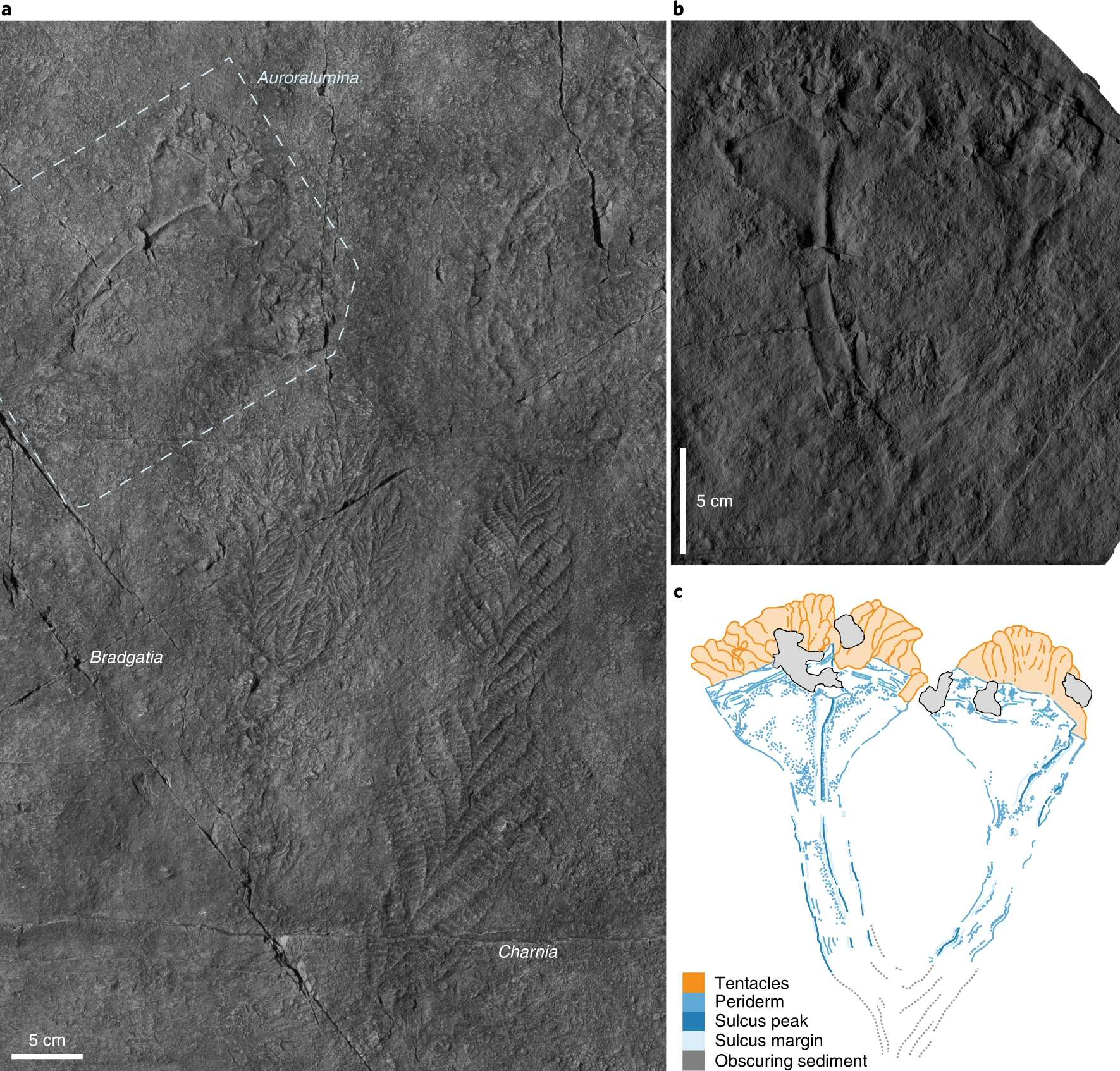
Holotype (top left), on a slab of Ediacaran rock containing Charnia (lower right) and Bradgatia (left)

Auroralumina attenboroughii is an organism composed of two goblet-shaped theca, which split off from a poorly preserved central stalk, and attains a length of 20 cm (7.9 in). The goblet-shaped structures are notably similar in size to each other, attaining a length of 12 cm (4.7 in) overall, and bear a distinct cup at their tops, which make up half the length of the stalks at 6 cm (2.4 in), and are also 6 cm (2.4 in) in width. There is also a notable ridge running up the full length of the goblet-shaped structures. The tops of the cups feature a straight rim, separated from the rest of the stalk by a small trench, with a crown of short, flexible projections coming out of the cups, which can reach lengths of 2.75 cm (1.1 in). Each project is consistent in width and have a blunt top, as well as being faintly wrinkled, with up to 30 projections counted from the left-hand cup.

The left-hand goblet is symmetrical on either side of the ridge, and it is inferred that the non-visible side would have been the same, making the organism's goblet-shaped structures tetra-radial. The ridges are also noted to have most likely been like troughs, separating each face of the goblet-shaped structure, akin to a sulcus, something common in fossil cnidarians.

== Taphonomy ==
Auroralumina is notably different from the surrounding matrix it sits in, which is irregular in texture, which is that of a mat-ground. The theca is preserved as negative epi-relief, with a majority of the goblets being impressions into the rock, whilst the ridges protrude from it. The surface of the theca is smooth in appearance compared to the surrounding mat-ground texture, and show little signs of deformation, suggesting that the theca was constructed of a sturdy material. Although it is noted that there are no biominerals present, suggesting that the walls of the theca may have been made of an organic material instead.

Meanwhile, the crowns of Auroralumina are instead preserved as positive epi-relief, meaning a majority of the projections protrude from the rocks surface, with occasional wrinkles being impressions into the rock. The projections also overlap each other, and bear many similarities to tentacles seen in living animals. The overall appearance of these projections, and their different mode of preservation from the theca suggest they were made of a much softer material.

== Palaeoecology ==
Auroralumina is noted to have a much wider crown than any known solitary cnidarian, and it is inferred it may have used this dense, wide crown of tentacles to feed on phytoplankton, protists, and other microorganisms, similar to living cnidarian today. Another study also notes that Ediacaran cnidarian genera, such as Auroralumina, may have had cnidocytes, a type of cell used to sting another organism that comes into contact with it, although in the case of Auroralumina and other Ediacaran cnidarians, these may have been used to anchor themselves to the seafloor and defend themselves rather than be used to capture prey. Its sturdy theca is also suggested to be amongst the earliest skeletons known in the fossil record, alongside Palaeopascichnus.

== Phylogeny ==
A phylogenetic analysis was conducted by Dunn et al. in 2022, which recovered Auroralumina as a stem-group medusozoan, alongside other stem-group medusozoans such as the Conulariida, which it bears similarities to.

- Animalia
  - Ctenophora
  - - Cnidaria
      - Anthozoa
      - Medusozoa
        - - Auroralumina
          - other stem-group Medusozoa (e.g. Conulariida)
        - crown-group Medusozoa
    - Bilateria

Another phylogenetic analysis conducted by Zhao et al. in 2026, during the formal description and naming of the early Cambrian jellyfish Mycozoon, would see Auroralumina's placement refined to being between Vendoconularia and the Hexangulaconulariidae under Medusozoa.

- Medusozoa
  - †Anabarites
  - †Baccaconularia
  - †Ilankirus
  - †Paraconularia ediacara
  - †Vendoconularia
  - †Auroralumina
  - - †Hexangulaconulariidae
      - †Septuconularia
      - - - †Arthrochites
          - - †Decimoconularia
            - †Hexangularconularia
  - - - Carinachitidae
        - †Pentaconularia
        - †Emeiconularia
        - †Carinachites
    - - Olivooidae
        - †Qinscyphus
        - - †Olivooides
          - - †Octapyrgites
            - †Quadrapyrgites
