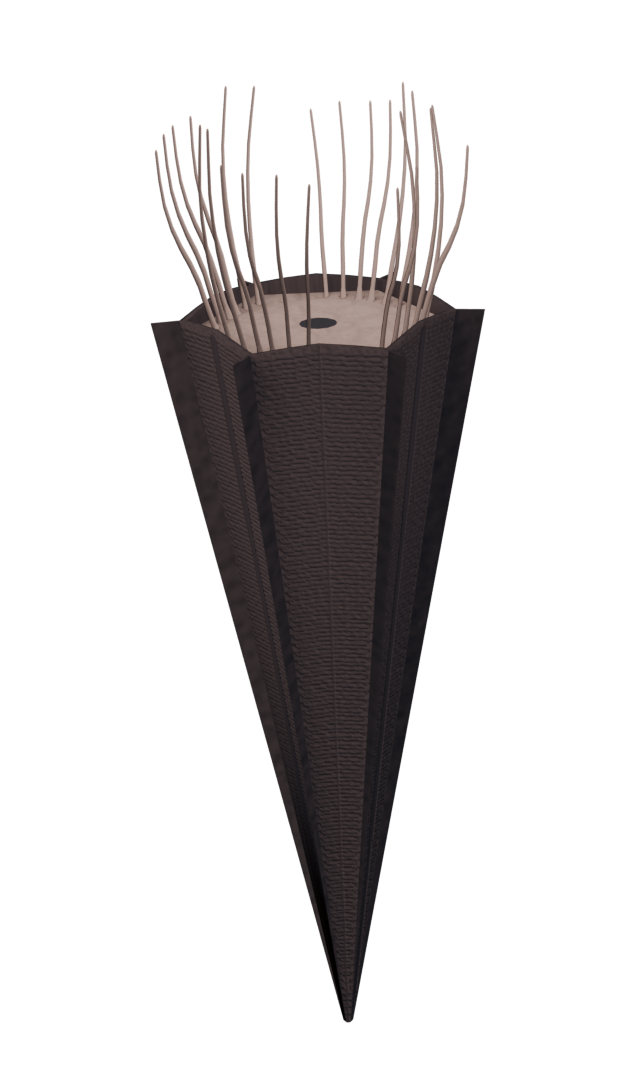
- 3D reconstruction of Vendoconularia triradiata

Scientific classification
- Kingdom: Animalia
- Family: †Protechiuridae
- Genus: †Vendoconularia; Ivantsov & Fedonkin, 2002
- Species: †V. triradiata

Binomial name
- †Vendoconularia triradiata Ivantsov & Fedonkin, 2002

= Vendoconularia =

Vendoconularia Temporal range: Late Ediacaran ~555 Ma

Extinct genus of marine invertebrates

Vendoconularia is a genus of Ediacaran organism consisting of a hexagonal cone, which is thought to have housed a tentaculate organism. Three longitudinal bands are interspersed between the six sides of the cone. The discovery of vendoconulariids in Proterozoic strata of Russia confirmed a 1987 prediction that conulariids constituted part of Ediacaran biota.

== Discovery and name ==
The holotype fossil of Vendoconularia was found from the Ust’ Pinega Formation, in the White Sea of Russia in 1997, and formally described in 2002.

The generic name Vendoconularia derives from Vendian, the Russian name for the Ediacaran; and the genus name conularia, due to its similar appearance to conulariids. The specific name triradiata derives from the English word triradiate, to mean three radiating folds.

== Description ==
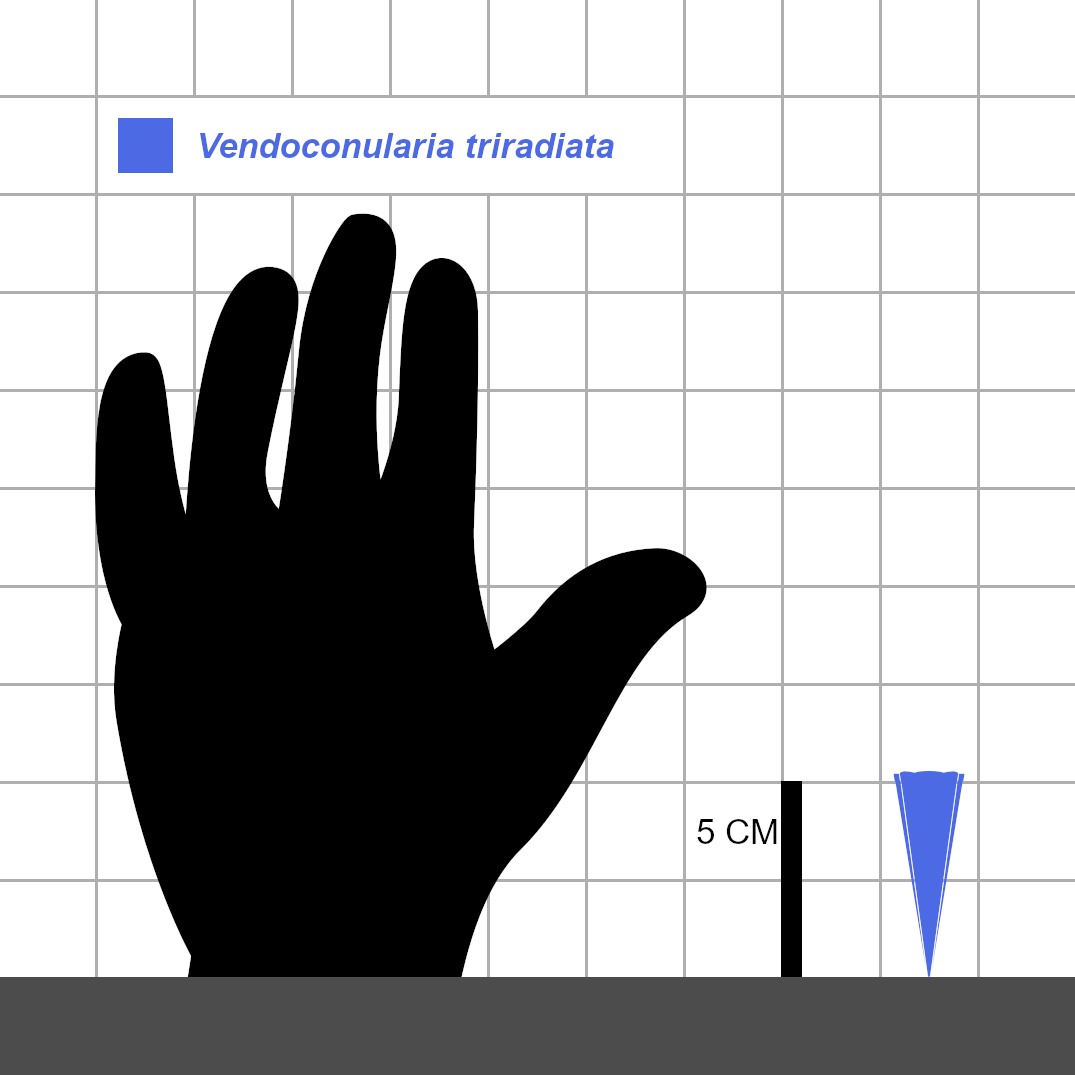
Size chart of Vendoconularia triradiate.

Vendoconularia triradiate is a probable conulariid, getting up to 54 mm (2.1 in) in length and 33 mm (1.3 in) at its widest, with a conical test consisting of six identical sides with three longitudinal bands in between two sides each, although known conulariids only have fourfold symmetry. The test itself would have been non-mineralised and flexible in life, which again, is unheard of in known conulariid genera.

A more recent study done on both Vendoconularia and Protechiurus by Ivanstov et al., 2019 recovered both as being related to each other under the newly erected family Protechiuridae, and also suggested that the aforementioned family is possibly either ancestral to the clade Conulariida, or to the anabaritids. Subsequent studies done after have noted that whilst a more detailed analysis is needed for Protechiurus to confidentially place it next to Vendoconularia phylogenetically, it does give further support for Vendoconularia (and Protechiurus) being stem-group conulariids.

== Phylogeny ==
A phylogenetic analysis conducted by Zhao et al. in 2026, during the formal description and naming of the early Cambrian jellyfish Mycozoon, would see Vendoconularia placed between Paraconularia ediacara and Auroralumina under the phylum Medusozoa.

- Medusozoa
  - †Anabarites
  - †Baccaconularia
  - †Ilankirus
  - †Paraconularia ediacara
  - †Vendoconularia
  - †Auroralumina
  - - †Hexangulaconulariidae
      - †Septuconularia
      - - - †Arthrochites
          - - †Decimoconularia
            - †Hexangularconularia
  - - - Carinachitidae
        - †Pentaconularia
        - †Emeiconularia
        - †Carinachites
    - - Olivooidae
        - †Qinscyphus
        - - †Olivooides
          - - †Octapyrgites
            - †Quadrapyrgites

== See also ==
- List of Ediacaran genera
