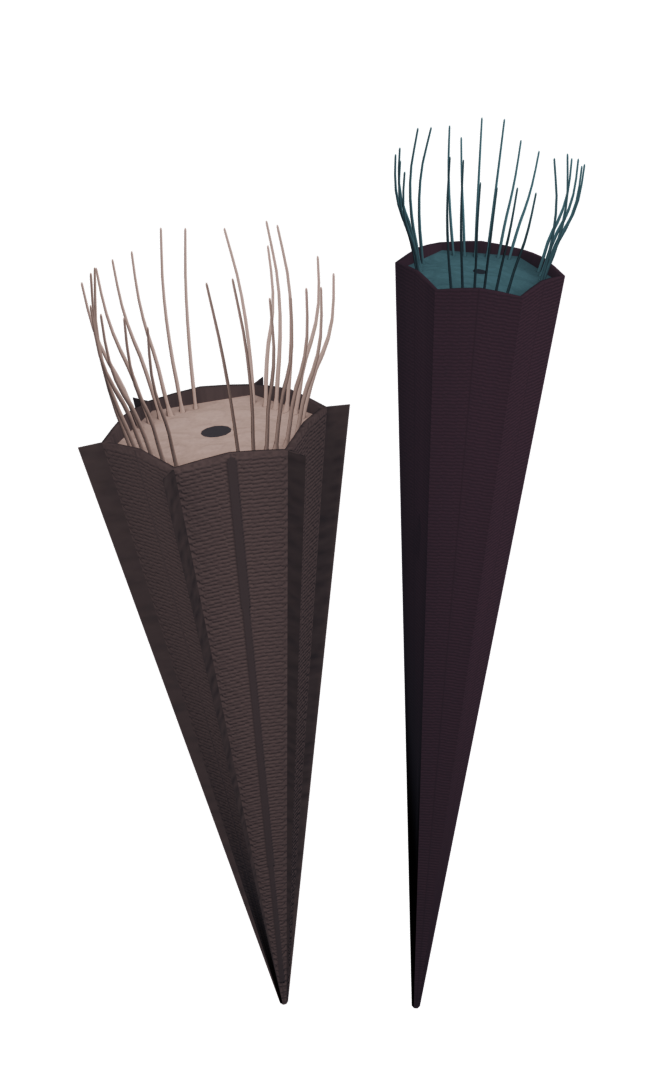
- 3D reconstructions of the protechiurids, Vendoconularia triradiata and Protechiurus edmondsi

Scientific classification
- Kingdom: Animalia
- Family: †Protechiuridae; Ivantsov et al., 2019

Genera
- † Vendoconularia; † Protechiurus

= Protechiuridae =

Protechiuridae Temporal range: late Ediacaran ~555–547.4 Ma

Extinct family of tubular shaped organisms

Protechiuridae is an extinct family from the Ediacaran, with possible relations to the phylum Cnidaria. They lived from around 555 to 547 Ma, with the type species being Protechiurus edmondsi.

== Description ==
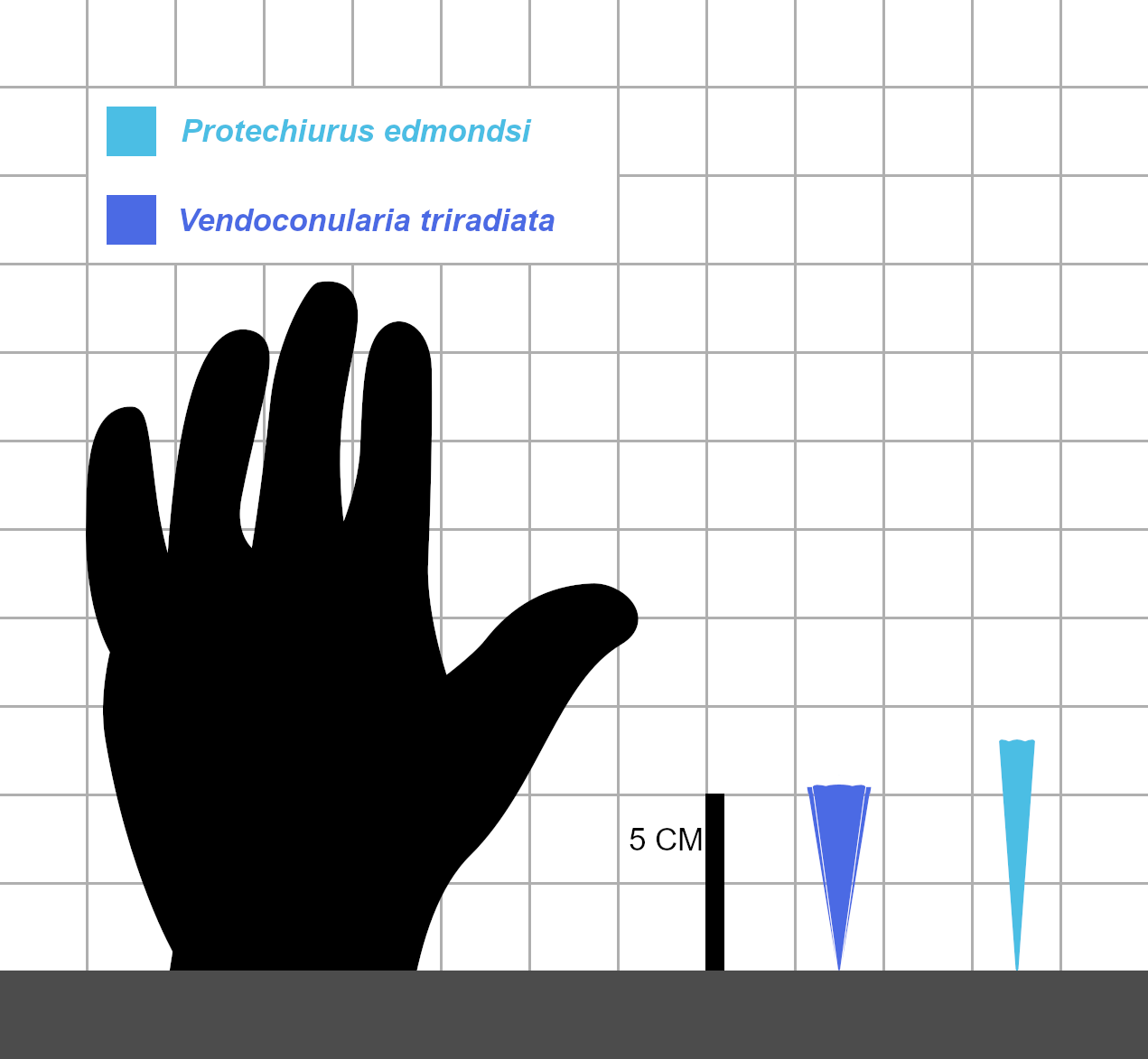
Size chart of the protechiurids, Vendoconularia triradiata and Protechiurus edmondsi.

Protechiurids have tubular, hexahedral tests, with sizes ranging from 55 mm (2.2 in) to 74 mm (2.9 in) in height. The test, which would have been non-mineralised and flexible in life, is made up of six identical sides, all joined by six prominent ridges or plates, as seen in Vendoconularia. On each side, there are also transverse lines running up the full length, similar to what is seen in conulariids.

== Affinities ==
It has been noted that the general morphology is not too dissimilar to that of the conulariids or anabaritids, which also consist of shells, bore small transverse lines and longitudinal plates, although the protechiurids differ from them due to not only having flexible shells, which the conulariids or anabaritids did not have, but also due to their six-fold symmetry, where as conulariids have a four-fold symmetry, and anabaritids a tri-fold symmetry. The discrepancy in the non-mineralised shell can possibly be explained by the fact that most Ediacaran forms might not have attainted the ability for biomineralisation, but even then, the radial symmetry of the protechiurids presents a greater challenge, although a cnidarian affinity is still not ruled out, and has subsequently been further supported.

The type species, Protechiurus, was previously described as an echiurid worm, based on the morphology on a singular fossil specimen, although subsequent research and new material showed this not to be the case, as mentioned above.

== Distribution ==
Genera of the family Protechiuridae are found within the White Sea area of Russia, in an area that correlates to the Ust’ Pinega Formation, as well as the Nama Group of Namibia, primarily within the Dabis Formation.

== Taxonomy ==
Protechiuridae includes the following genera and species:

- † Protechiurus Glaessner, 1979 (Type species)
  - † Protechiurus edmondsi Glaessner, 1979
- † Vendoconularia Ivantsov & Fedonkin, 2002
  - † Vendoconularia triradiata Ivantsov & Fedonkin, 2002

== See also ==
- List of Ediacaran genera
