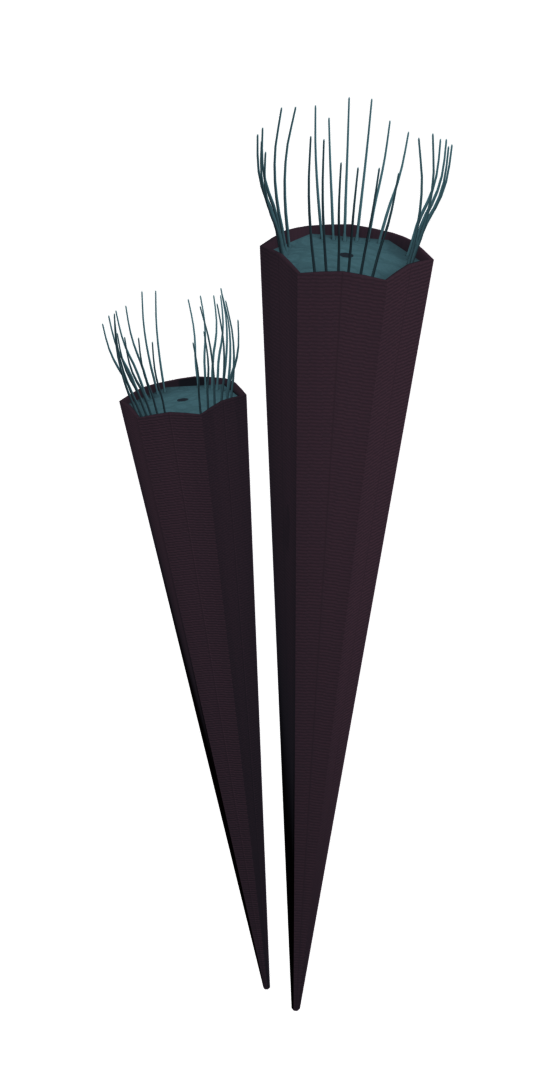
- 3D reconstruction of Protechiurus edmondsi

Scientific classification
- Kingdom: Animalia
- Family: †Protechiuridae
- Genus: †Protechiurus; Glaessner, 1979
- Species: †P. edmondsi

Binomial name
- †Protechiurus edmondsi Glaessner, 1979

Synonyms
- ✝Vendoglossa Seilacher, 2007; ✝V. tuberculata Seilacher, 2007

= Protechiurus =

Protechiurus Temporal range: Late Ediacaran ~547.4 Ma

Extinct genus of marine invertebrates

Protechiurus is an extinct conical organism from the Ediacaran Nama Group in Namibia. First interpreted as a echiurid worm, it is now interpreted as a cnidarian. It is a monotypic genus, containing only Protechiurus edmondsi.

== Discovery ==
Fossil material of Protechiurus was discovered in the Aar Farm Member of the Dabis Formation, Kuibis Quartzite, in the Nama Group, Namibia in 1963, and was formally described and named in 1979.

== Etymology ==
The generic name Protechiurus derives from the Greek word protos, to mean "first"; and the generic name Echiurus, a genus of spoon worm. The specific name derives from the Latinised surname of Dr. Stanley Joe Edmonds of the Department of Zoology, University of Adelaide and South Australian Museum.

== Description ==
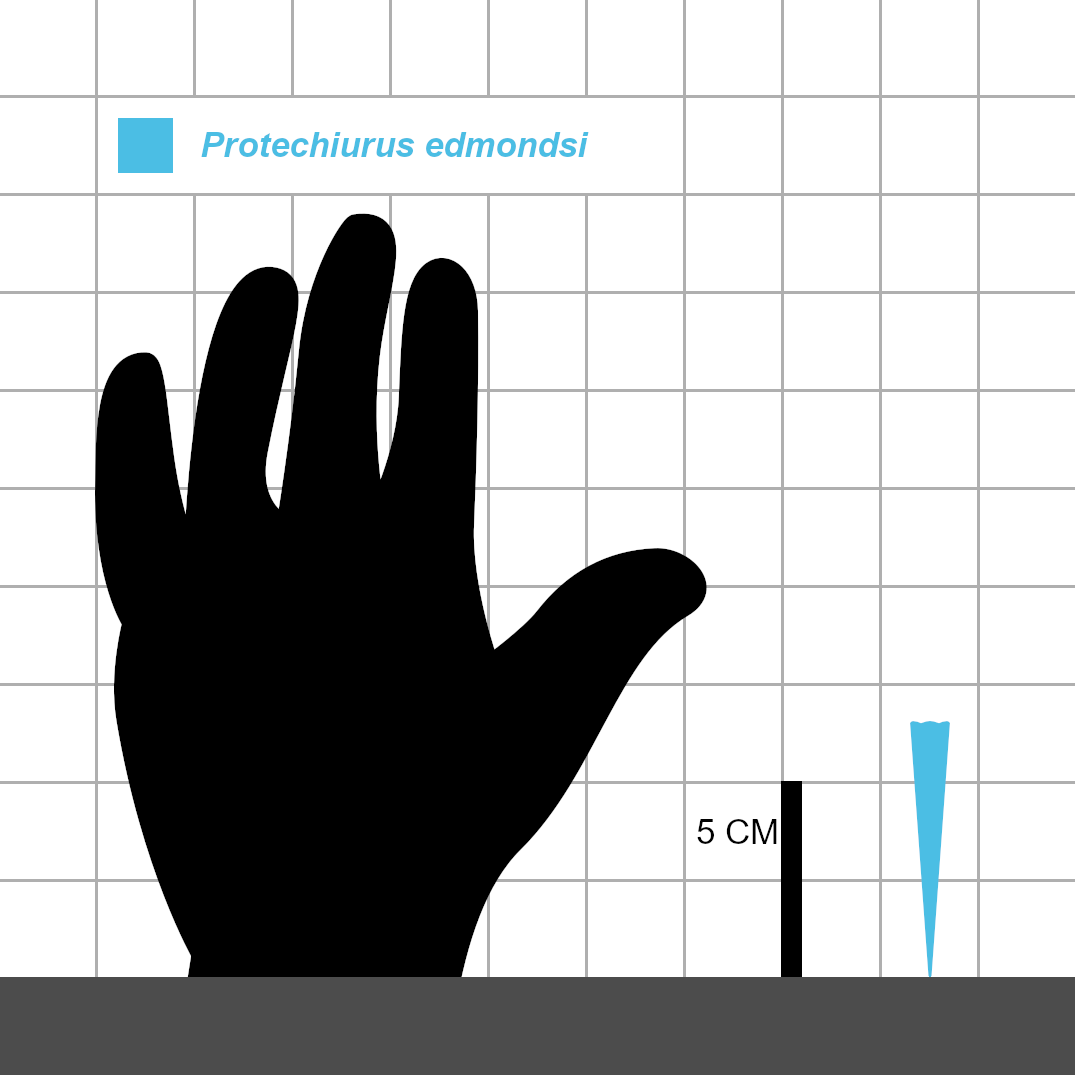
Size chart of Protechiurus edmondsi.

Protechiurus edmondsi is an elongated, hexahedral organism, growing up to 74 mm (2.9 in) in length and with a width of 19 mm (0.7 in) at its widest point. It is considerably narrow at one end and wide at the other, previously interpreted as the anterior and posterior ends respectively as an echiurid worm, now interpreted as the closed and open ends respectively as a tubular cnidarian. The body is also noted to be compressed, which may have been due to the body being made of an elastic material, along with six longitudinal ridges on the body, with the ones on the flatter sides being more prominent, although do not feature plates like Vendoconularia. Although more poorly preserved, there are also transverse lines along the length of the body, being tuberculate in shape.

== Affinities ==
When originally described in 1979 by Martin Glaessner, the overall appearance of the Protechiurus saw it being assigned to the worm phylum Echiura, with the thinner end of the fossil being seen as a proboscis, and the longitudinal ridges being a feature only known to echiurid worms. In 1994, Protechiurus was then placed as a "vendobiont", alongside other similar bag-like organisms such as Ernietta and Pteridinium, in support of the Ediacaran fauna representing a distinct phylum, separate from modern phyla seen today. Later, in 2003, the placement as an ecdysozoan was then suggested for Protechiurus, again based on the appearance of the then singular fossil. In 2007, a new fossil had been found from the same locality as Protechiurus, Vendoglossa tuberculata, a flattened fossil with longitudinal ridges and transverse lines, and similar in overall shape. During the description of this then separate organism, other palaeontologists had suggested that Protechiurus may in fact be a proto-chordate, whilst others, like Bruce Runnegar, suggested it to possibly be a dubiofossil.

This all came to a head in 2019, when Ivantsov et al. had decided to not only restudy Protechiurus, but also the previously described Vendoglossa and Vendoconularia. They had noted many similarities between all organisms, from the general conical morphology, longitudinal ridges to transverse lines. Here the researchers synonymised Vendoglossa with Protechiurus, and erected a new family, Protechiuridae, which they postured may be a basal group to the cnidarian scyphozoans, being ancestral to both the conulariids and anabaritids, two families that share a similar appearance to the protechiurids like Protechiurus with tubular to conical bodies. Subsequent studies done after have noted that whilst a more detailed analysis is needed for Protechiurus to confidentially place it next to Vendoconularia phylogenetically, it does give support for Protechiurus (and Vendoconularia) possibly being a stem-group conulariid.

== See also ==
- Vendoconularia
- List of Ediacaran genera
