= Somatohelix =

Somatohelix Temporal range: Ediacaran, around 555 Ma

Scientific classification
- Domain: incertae sedis
- Genus: †Somatohelix; Sappenfield et al., 2011
- Species: †S. sinuosus

Binomial name
- †Somatohelix sinuosus Sappenfield et al., 2011

Tubular fossil taxon

Somatohelix is an extinct organism of uncertain affinities from the late Ediacaran of the Flinders Ranges in South Australia. Originally interpreted as a trace fossil, better preserved material was found which confirmed it was not a trace fossil. It is a monotypic genus, containing only Somatohelix sinuosus.

== Discovery and naming ==
The original material of Somatohelix was found in the Ediacara Member of the Rawnsley Quartzite, in Nilpena Ediacara National Park South Australia in 1969 and informally listed under 'Form E' and 'Form F', but with the discovery of new material, were formally described and named in 2011.

The generic name Somatohelix is derived from the Greek words soma, to mean "body"; and helix, to mean "helical/coiled", referring to the overall appearance of the fossil material. The specific name sinuosus is derived directly from the Latin word sinuosus, to mean "winding/sinuous", again referring to the appearance of the fossil material.

== Description ==
Somatohelix sinuosus is a curvilinear, spiralling tubular form, growing from 50–150 mm (2.0–5.9 in) in length, and with a width of 3–7 mm (0.1–0.3 in). Where whole specimens are known, the terminal end, or base of the tubes, is typically rounded in appearance. As for the whole tube, the entire length has consistent diameter and is smooth, and was most likely soft as well, as evidenced by folds in the fossil material which formed upon felling and burial of the tubes. As for the sinuosity of the tubes themselves, have an average value of 3.06, although there are out-liners within the smaller and larger specimens, which have smaller and larger wavelengths respectively.

Accompanying 4 out of the 191 collected specimens is a circular feature at one end of the tube, with one specimen being fully attached to said tube, with the circles themselves being wrinkly in nature, and are preserved as positives and negatives.

== Affinity ==
The affinities of Somatohelix remains unknown, but several comparisons have been made to other tubular forms. It has been compared to Funisia in their modes of preservation, but the similarities end there, as Somatohelix does not have any serial partitions/divisions like Funisia, nor does it branch, as seen in some Funisia specimens.

Another comparison is with Vendoconularia, which also has many similar preservational traits with Somatohelix, like folding and curvature. Although folding within Vendoconularia specimens is much rarer than what is seen Somatohelix, and does not have a consistent sinuosity like Somatohelix. Alongside this, the widest specimen of Vendoconularia is 2.1 mm (0.1 in), which is a lot thinner than Somatohelix. Vendoconularia is also preserved as carbonised, flattened tubes.

It is also noted that modern analogues of organisms with a helical constructional morphology are found not only in disparate kingdoms, but also in multiple domains. Cirrhipathes spiralis is given as an example, which has a helical shape that is used to maximize its surface area.

== See also ==
- Cloudina
- Corumbella
- Saarina
- Sinotubulites
- List of Ediacaran genera
