= Cloudinidae =

Cloudinidae Temporal range: 555–529 Ma
- Fossil of Cloudina

Scientific classification
- Kingdom: Animalia
- Phylum: incertae sedis
- Family: †Cloudinidae; Hahn and Pflug, 1985

Species
- Cloudina Germs, 1972; Cl. hartmannae Germs 1972; Cl. riemkeae Germs 1972; Cl. lucianoi Beurlen & Sommer, 1957) Zaine & Fairchild, 1985; Cl. sinensis Zhang, Li et Dung, 1992; Cl. carinata Cortijo, Musa, Jensena et Palacios, 2009; Cl. ningqiangensis Cai et al., 2017; Cl. xuanjiangpingensis Cai et al., 2017; Conotubus Zhang and Lin 1986; Co. hemiannulatus Zhang and Lin 1986; (others?); Acuticocloudina Hahn and Pflug, 1985

Synonyms
- Aulophycus lucianoi Beurlen & Sommer 1957 = C. waldei Hahn & Pflug, 1985 = C. lucianoi Zaine & Fairchild, 1985

Group of extinct aquatic animals

The cloudinids, an early metazoan family containing the genera Acuticocloudina, Cloudina and Conotubus, lived in the late Ediacaran period about 550 million years ago and became extinct at the base of the Cambrian. They formed millimetre-scale conical fossils consisting of calcareous cones nested within one another; the appearance of the organism itself remains unknown. The name Cloudina honors the 20th-century geologist and paleontologist Preston Cloud.

Cloudinids comprise two genera: Cloudina itself is mineralized, whereas Conotubus is at best weakly mineralized, whilst sharing the same "funnel-in-funnel" construction.

Cloudinids had a wide geographic range, reflected in the present distribution of localities in which their fossils are found, and are an abundant component of some deposits. They never appear in the same layers as soft-bodied Ediacaran biota, but the fact that some sequences contain cloudinids and Ediacaran biota in alternating layers suggests that these groups had different environmental preferences. It has been suggested that cloudinids lived embedded in microbial mats, growing new cones to avoid being buried by silt. However no specimens have been found embedded in mats, and their mode of life is still an unresolved question.

The classification of the cloudinids has proved difficult: they were initially regarded as polychaete worms, and then as coral-like cnidarians on the basis of what look like buds on some specimens. Current scientific opinion is divided between classifying them as polychaetes and regarding it as unsafe to classify them as members of any broader grouping. In 2020, a new study of pyritized specimens from the Wood Canyon Formation in Nevada showed the presence of Nephrozoan type guts, the oldest on record, supporting the bilaterian interpretation.

Cloudinids are important in the history of animal evolution for two reasons. They are among the earliest and most abundant of the small shelly fossils with mineralized skeletons, and therefore feature in the debate about why such skeletons first appeared in the Late Ediacaran. The most widely supported answer is that their shells are a defense against predators, as some Cloudina specimens from China bear the marks of multiple attacks, which suggests they survived at least a few of them. The holes made by predators are approximately proportional to the size of the Cloudina specimens, and Sinotubulites fossils, which are often found in the same beds, have so far shown no such holes. These two points suggest that predators attacked in a selective manner, and the evolutionary arms race which this indicates is commonly cited as a cause of the Cambrian explosion of animal diversity and complexity.

== Morphology ==
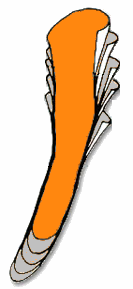
Cutaway diagram of Cloudina showing "living space" within the shell.

Cloudina varies in size from a diameter of 0.3 to 6.5 mm, and 8 to 150 mm in length. Fossils consist of a series of stacked vase-like calcite tubes, whose original mineral composition is unknown, but inferred to be high-magnesium calcite. Each cone traps a significant pore space beneath it, and stacks eccentrically in the one below. This results in a ridged external appearance. The overall tube is curved or sinuous, and occasionally branches. The tube walls are 8 to 50 micrometers thick, usually lying in the range 10 to 25 μm. Although it used to be thought that the tubes had test-tube like bases, detailed three-dimensional reconstruction has shown that the tubes had an open base. There is evidence that the tube was flexible.

== Classification ==
Cloudina was originally classified in 1972 as a member of the Cribricyathea, a class known from the Early Cambrian. Glaessner (1976) accepted this classification and also proposed that Cloudina was similar to the annelid worms, particularly serpulid polychaetes. However, Hahn & Pflug (1985) and Conway Morris et al.. (1990) doubted both Germs' and Glaessner's suggested relationships, and were unwilling to classify it to anything more than its own family, Cloudinidae. Some specimens of Cloudina hartmannae display budding, which implies asexual reproduction. On this basis Grant (1990) classified Cloudina as a coral-like cnidarian. Since the tubes had an open base, creating a single living space rather than a series of separate chambers, Cloudina is more likely to be a stem group polychaete worm, in other words an evolutionary "aunt" or "cousin" of more recent polychaetes. This interpretation is reinforced by the even distribution of bore-holes made by predators. However, as with so many Ediacaran life forms, there is great debate surrounding its position in the tree of life, and classification between the kingdom and family level may be unwise.

== Ecology ==
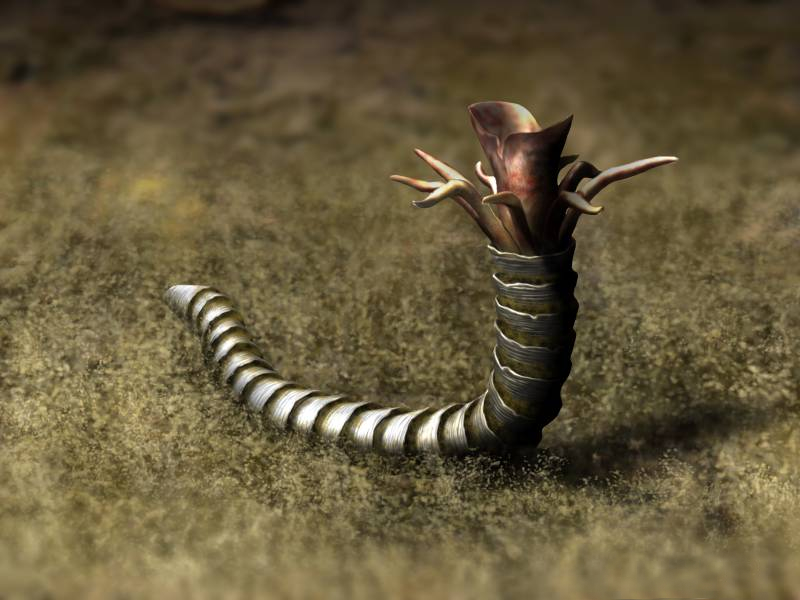
Restoration of Cloudina hartmannae with speculative mouth parts

Cloudina is frequently found in association with stromatolites, which are limited to shallow water; their isotopic composition suggests that water temperatures were relatively cool. They have also been found in normal sea-floor sediments, suggesting that they were not only restricted to dwelling on microbial mounds. On the other hand, Cloudina has never been found in the same layers as the soft-bodied Ediacara biota, but Cloudina and Ediacara biota have been found in alternating layers. This suggests that the two groups of organisms had different environmental preferences.

In many Cloudina specimens the ridges formed by the cones are of varying width, which suggests the organisms grew at a variable rate. Adolf Seilacher suggests that they adhered to microbial mats, and that the growth phases represented the organism keeping pace with sedimentation—growing through new material deposited on it that would otherwise bury it. Kinks in the developing tube are easily explained by the mat falling slightly from the horizontal. Because of its small size, Cloudina would be expected to be found in situ in the microbial mat, especially if, as Seilacher suggests, sedimentat built up around it during its lifetime. But all the many specimens discovered to date have only been found having been washed out of their places of growth. A further argument against Seilacher's hypothesis is that the predatory borings found in many specimens are not concentrated at what would be the top end, as one would expect if the animal was mainly buried. An alternative is that the organism dwelt on seaweeds, but until a specimen unquestionably in situ is discovered, its mode of life remains open to debate.

The tubes often appear to form colonies, although they are sometimes found in more isolated situations. The frequent appearance of large and sometimes single-species colonies has been attributed to the lack of significant predation. On the other hand, in some locations up to 20% of Cloudina fossils contain predatory borings ranging from 15 to 400 μm in diameter. The boreholes are rather evenly distributed along the tube length, and some tubes had been bored multiple times—hence the organism could survive attacks, since predators do not attack empty shells. This may indicate that the animal could vary its position in the tube in response to predation, or that it occupied the full length—but not the full width—of the tube. The even distribution is perhaps difficult to reconcile with an infaunal lifestyle, mainly buried in a microbial mat, and adds weight to Miller's suggestion that the animal lived on seaweeds or in a reef environment. If modern-day molluscs are a suitable analogy, the size distribution of the borings suggests that the predator was similar in size to Cloudina.

Fossil findings in the Nama Group, Namibia, suggest that Cloudina was one of the first reef-building animals, but machine-learning facilitated 3D tomography indicates that the 'reef-forming' fossils are in fact simply aggregations of solitary individuals.

== Fossil locations ==
Cloudina occurred in calcium carbonate rich areas of stromatolite reefs. It is found in association with Namacalathus, which like Cloudina was "weakly skeletal" and solitary, and Namapoikia, which was "robustly skeletal" and formed sheets on open surfaces.

First found in the Nama Group in Namibia, Cloudina has also been reported in Oman, China's Dengying Formation, Canada, Uruguay, Argentina, Antarctica, Brazil, Nevada, central Spain, northwest Mexico and California, in west and south Siberia. The Cloudina fossils found in association with late Precambrian-Early Cambrian anabaritids SSF and tubular agglutinated skeletal fossils Platysolenites and Spirosolenites in Siberia.

== Paleontological importance ==
Although not the first small shelly fossil to be found, Cloudina is one of the earliest and most abundant. The evolution of external shells in the Late Ediacaran is thought to be a defence against predators, marking the start of an evolutionary arms race. While predatory borings are common in Cloudina specimens, no such borings have been found in Sinotubulites, a similar shelly fossil sometimes found in the same beds. In addition, the diameters of borings in Cloudina are proportional to the sizes of specimens, which suggests that predators were selective about the size of their prey. These two indications that predators attacked selectively suggest the possibility of speciation in response to predation, which is often postulated as a potential cause of the rapid diversification of animals in the Early Cambrian.

== See also ==
- Anabarites
- Corumbella
- Saarina
- Sinotubulites
- Somatohelix
- List of Ediacaran genera
