= Corumbella =

Corumbella Temporal range: late Ediacaran ~543 Ma
- Fossil of Corumbella werneri

Scientific classification
- Kingdom: Animalia
- Phylum: Cnidaria
- Class: Scyphozoa
- Family: †Corumbellidae
- Genus: †Corumbella; Hahn et al., 1982
- Species: †C. werneri

Binomial name
- †Corumbella werneri Hahn et al., 1982

Extinct genus of Ediacaran animals

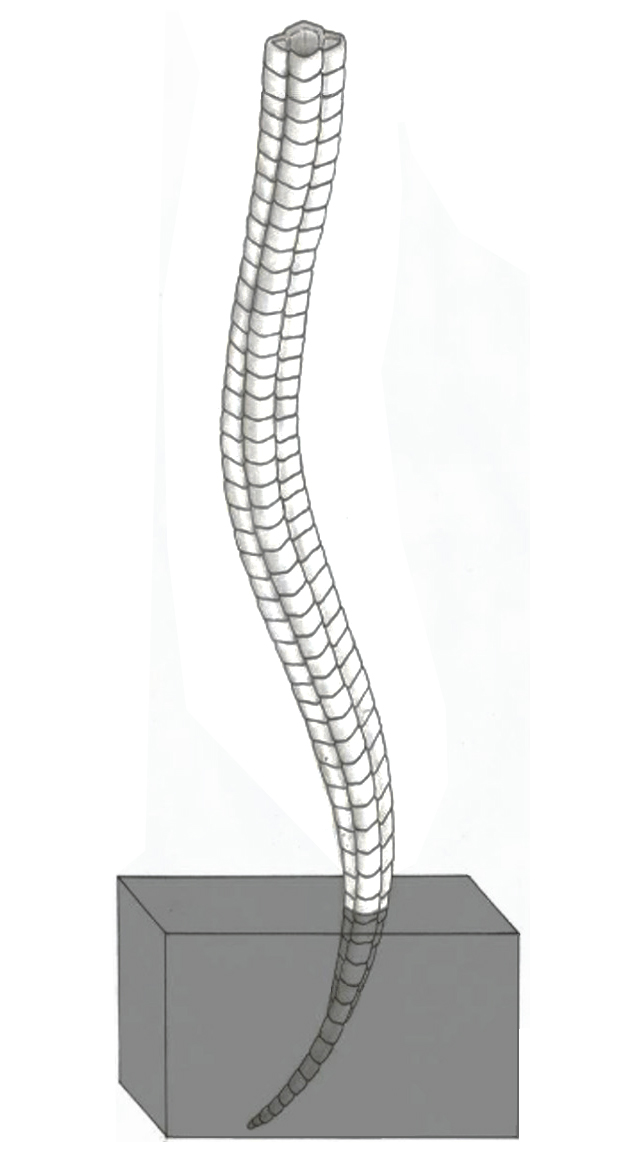
Reconstruction and life position of Corumbella werneri

Corumbella is an extinct genus of terminal-Ediacaran animals. It is the only genus in the monotypic family Corumbellidae, and is represented by a single species Corumbella werneri. It possessed a carapace made up of thick polygonal rings in which plates with pores and papillae attest to the advent of skeletogenesis in the latest Neoproterozoic metazoan. It was sessile and somewhat resembles the later conulariids, though this similarity is likely superficial; its secretion of an aragonitic scleritome suggests a eumetazoan affinity.

== See also ==
- Cloudina
- Saarina
- Sinotubulites
- Somatohelix

List of Ediacaran genera
