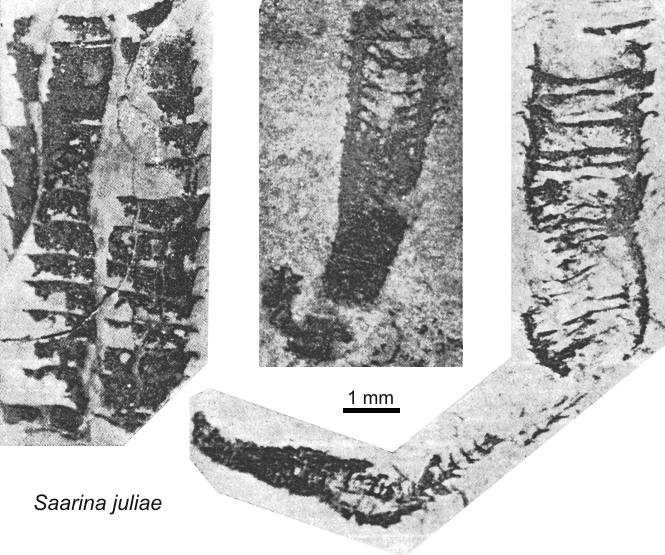
- A fossil of Saarina juliae

Scientific classification
- Kingdom: Animalia
- Phylum: incertae sedis
- Family: †Saarinidae
- Genus: †Saarina; Sokolov, 1965

Species
- S. tenera Sokolov, 1965; S. juliae Gnilovskaya, 1996; S. hagadorni Selly et al., 2019

= Saarina =

Saarina Temporal range: Ediacaran to Cambrian, about 558–533 Ma

Cloudinimorph fossils from the Ediacaran and Early Cambrian

Saarina are cloudinimorph fossils from the Ediacaran (Vendian) and Early Cambrian marine deposits of European Russia and Laurentia. They are tubes made up of stacked conical elements. These fossils are comparable to the dwelling tubes of worms or cnidarians.

== Occurrence ==
Fossils of the type species, S. tenera, were found in a core from the Gatchina No.13 borehole in the Leningrad Region, Russia. The most conspicuous deposits associated with these fossils are referred to as the Lomonosov Fm., Lontova Horizon, and lower Tommotian (=Cambrian Stage 2).

S. juliae was found in a core from the Gavrilov-Yam No.5 borehole, Yaroslavl Region. The deposites with S. kirsanovi and S. juliae are referred to the Redkino Horizon, Upper Vendian (Ediacaran), and are about 558 mya old.

They are also known from late Ediacaran to early Cambrian rocks in the state of Nevada in the USA, in the form of S. hagadorni.

== Description ==
Saarina was a tube-dwelling organism of unknown biological affinity, known from its siliciclastic deposits dating to the late Ediacaran (Vendian) and lowest Cambrian of the Russian Platform. It was funnel-shaped, consisting of dense, thinly-walled and annulated, ringlike segments. The fossils are preserved in the substrate as a result of superficial mineralization during the early stages of decomposition.

The fossils are typically found in mudstone and preserved in the form of flat pyrite ribbons as a result of superficial pyritization in the early stage of organic decomposition.

Saarina tubes were cylindrical in form, conical at the base, consisting of funnel-shaped narrow rings. The wall of the tube was thin, originally organic-walled, not chitinous. The tubes attained widths up to 7 mm.

The species of the Saarina differ mainly in the forms of the funnels:

- S. tenera have straight conical funnels.
- S. juliae have conical funnels, curved outward.
- S. hagadorni have funnels that are slightly conical, with a slightly outward projecting collared rim.

== See also ==
- Cloudina
- Corumbella
- Sinotubulites
- Somatohelix

List of Ediacaran genera
