= Sinotubulites =

Sinotubulites Temporal range: 550–541 Ma

Scientific classification
- Kingdom: Animalia
- Phylum: incertae sedis
- Genus: †Sinotubulites; Chen, Chen et Qian, 1981

Type species
- †Sinotubulites baimatuoensis Chen, Chen et Qian, 1981

Species
- S. baimatuoensis Chen, Chen et Qian, 1981; S. cienegensis McMenamin, 1985; S. triangularis Chai, 2015; S. pentacarinalis Chai, 2015; S. hexagonus Chai, 2015

Extinct genus of tubular animals

Sinotubulites is a genus of small, tube-shaped shelly fossils from near the terminal boundary of the Ediacaran period in formations within China and North America. It is often found in association with Cloudina, and much like Cloudina, is important to studies done on the Cambrian Explosion. They often had a kind of compressed accordion-like appearance rather than the stacked cones of Cloudina.

== Discovery and naming ==
The first fossil material for Sinotubulites was found in the Dengying Formation's Baimatuo Member, Yangtze Gorge South China, and formally described in 1977 as ?Cloudina sp., but was redescribed and named in 1981.

The generic name Sinotubulites is derived from the Latin words sino, to mean "China"; and tubulus, to mean "tube"; and the Greek suffix -ites.

== Description ==
Sinotubulites is a tubular organism, which is noted to have a "tube-in-tube" structure composed of four to seven thin layers, with most specimens being straight or slightly curved, with openings at either end of all specimens. It has also been split up into "Small", "Medium", and "Large" types depending on width, but excluding length, with the longest known specimens coming in at 20 mm (0.8 in) in length.

"Large" types have a width of 4–5 mm (0.2–0.2 in), and consist of irregular polygonal cross-sections, with regular spaced annulations and troughs along the tube surface. "Medium" types have a width of 1.5–3 mm (0.1–0.1 in), and range from having finely spaced annulations to irregular annulations along the tube surface. "Small" types have a width of 0.4–1 mm (0.0–0.0 in), consisting of a more circular cross-section, and a smooth outer surface.

== Preservation ==
Due to the wide distribution of Sinotubulites, it also has a wide range of preservation. Tubes found in the Yangtze Gorges region of South China generally preserve silicified or dolomitized, leading to the interpretation that the tubes may have been calcareous in life, which was replaced by silica during fossilisation. Tubes found in southern Shaanxi region preserve as phosphate, silica and phosphate, or silica tubes within a dolomite matrix. Fully phosphatic specimens show much more weaker layered structures, whilst silica preserved tubes show more clear multi-layered walls. Specimens composed of both silica and phosphate show coating of the latter mineral on the surface of silica layers, replacing wall layers and infilling the spaces between the silica layers.

Tubes found within North America are found preserved as calcareous tubes, with some specimens noted to have irregular and blotchy silica overgrowths, most likely due to the infilling of voids caused by diagenetic dissolution from the surrounding matrix, which consists of carbonate minerals.

A recent study has further supported that tubes being made of a calcareous mineral, and going further to suggest aragonite as a likely tube mineral, and also noted that close analysis on sections of tube have shown that the tubes first underwent silicification, and then phosphatization, both of which greatly preserve surviving cells and tissues in high detail.

== Ecology ==
Sinotubulites and Cloudina (discovered in 1972) are currently the two earliest known fossils of organisms that mineralized shells when alive, and are often found in the same fossil beds. It has been noted that Cloudina specimens often have tiny holes bored in them, which are attributed to predators, while no such borings have been found in Sinotubulites. This suggests that Sinotubulites had evolved features that made it a much less attractive target than Cloudina. As a result, both organisms are important in analyses of the Cambrian explosion, as predation and the appearance of mineralised components are often cited as possible causes of the "explosion".

As for the mode of living for Sinotubulites, it is noted that while specimens in Shaanxi are transported, hampering the ability to obtain ecological information from them, whilst specimens within the Dengying Formation are more likely to be preserved in situ. It is noted that the Dengying tubes lie parallel to the bedding plane in which they are preserved on, and their general morphology may give ecological clues as well. All specimens are open at either end of the tube, along with no attachment structures being found to date, indicating that neither end was attached to the substrate. The general structure of the tube itself is also more suited for laying on the substrate rather than standing, preventing currents from rolling the tube, suggesting a procumbent epifaunal lifestyle.

== Taxonomy ==
First assigned to Cloudina in 1977 under ?Cloudina sp. due to similarities between the two genera, and redescribed under a new genus in 1981, Sinotubulites has had 7 species assigned to it, although currently only 5 are considered valid :

Species	Authority	Location	Status	Notes	Refs
Sinotubulites baimatuoensis	Chen et al. (1981)	China, North America	Valid		
Sinotubulites cienegensis	McMenamin (1985)	China, North America	Valid		
Sinotubulites shaanxiensis	Li et Dong (1992)	China	Invalid	Synonym of S. baimatuoensis.	
Sinotubulites levis	Li et Dong (1992)	China	Invalid	Synonym of S. baimatuoensis.	
Sinotubulites triangularis	Chai et al. (2015)	China	Valid		
Sinotubulites pentacarinalis	Chai et al. (2015)	China	Valid		
Sinotubulites hexagonus	Chai et al. (2015)	China	Valid		

== See also ==
- Corumbella
- Saarina
- Somatohelix
- List of Ediacaran genera
