= Mariochrea =

Mariochrea Temporal range: Early Cambrian

Scientific classification
- Kingdom: Animalia
- Phylum: incertae sedis
- Family: †Anabaritidae
- Genus: †Mariochrea; Val'kov, 1982
- Species: †M. sinuosa

Binomial name
- †Mariochrea sinuosa Val'kov, 1982

Synonyms
- Gastreochrea Val'kov, 1982; Gastreochrea viva Val'kov, 1982

Extinct tubular genus of unknown affinities

Mariochrea is an extinct anabaritid from the early Cambrian of Siberia. It is a monotypic genus, containing only Mariochrea sinuosa.

== Discovery ==
Fossil material of Mariochrea was found in the upper Manykayan Stage of the Siberian Platform in Siberia, Russia, and described and named in 1982.

== Description ==
Mariochrea sinuosa is an anabaritid that is commonly found as internal moulds, which are sub-divided into stacked segments, which have a rounded triangular transverse profile, with an aperture that is either also rounded triangular, or clover-leaf shaped in appearance. The overall thecae is usually straight to slightly curved, with smaller phosphatised examples being composed of stacked cone-in-cone segments.

== Affinities ==
When described in 1982, Mariochrea would be placed within the obsolete family Angustiochreidae, although in 1989 two studies would be published, with one placing it in the Anabaritid subfamily Tiksithecinae, whilst another placed it in the obsolete family Mariochreidae, the latter of which would be further supported in studies published between 1990 and 1996. In a study published in 2009, Mariochrea would be brought out of Mariochreidae, and placed within the family Anabaritidae, thereby making the family Mariochreidae obsolete. This study would also make Gastreochrea a junior synonym of Mariochrea, alongside making the species G. viva a junior synonym of M. sinuosa, due to the notable similarities between the two genera, and Gastreochrea being considered to be older specimens of Mariochrea.
