= Helmut Kiderlen =

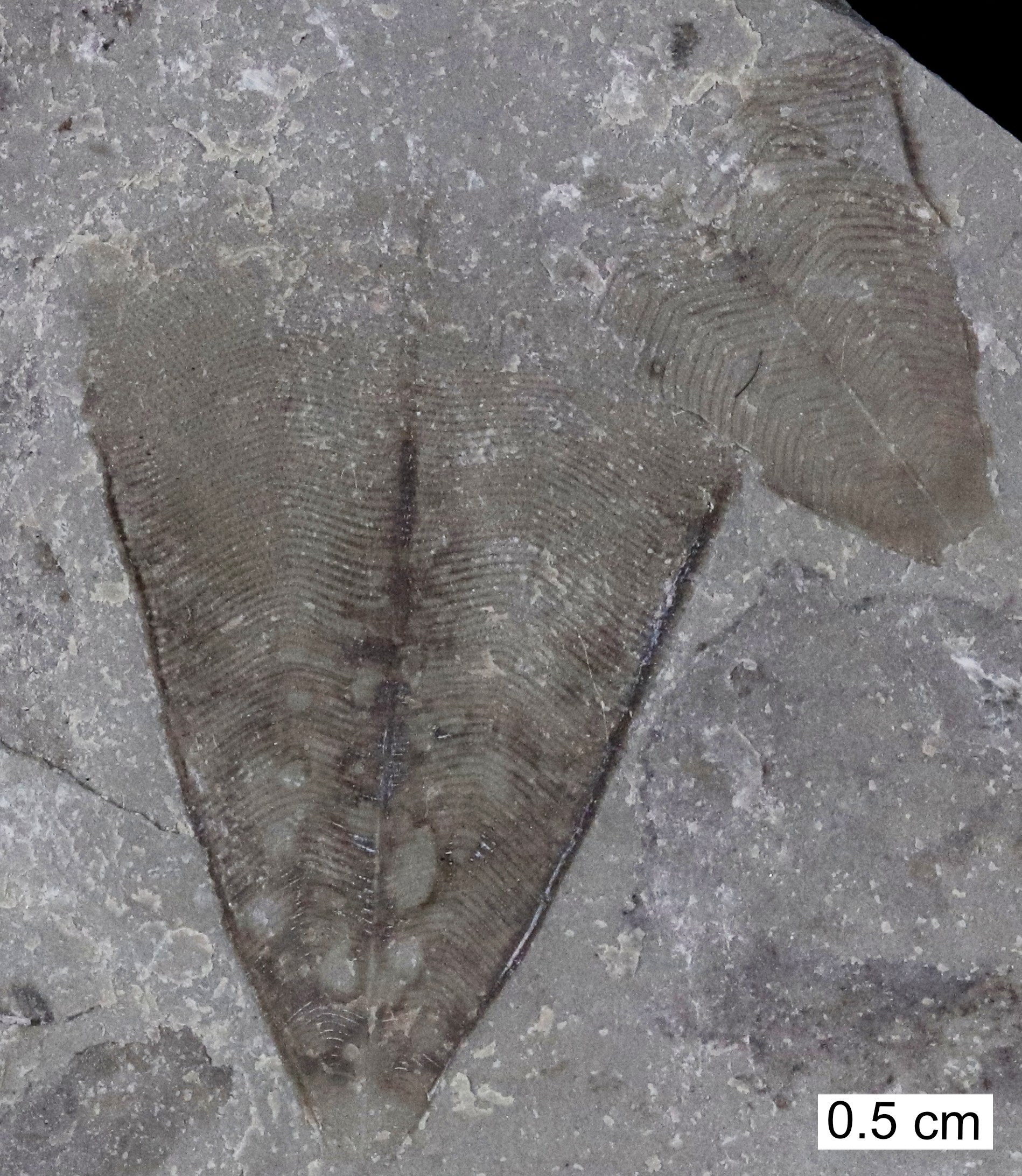
Two Silurian conulariids (Conularia niagarensis)

Helmut Kiderlen (3 March 1905 in Ulm – 8 October 1995 in Freiburg im Breisgau) was a German geologist.

He is remember mostly as the first person to suggest the hypothesis about cnidarian affinities of conulariids. In 1937 he published a paper in which he presented evidence that this extinct group, enigmatic for his predecessors, either belonged to or was closely related to scyphozoans. This hypothesis is currently generally accepted.

Holoconularia kiderleni Hergarten, 1985, a Devonian conulariid, was named in his honour.
