= Carinachitidae =

Carinachitidae Temporal range: Cambrian

Scientific classification
- Kingdom: Animalia
- Phylum: Cnidaria
- Class: †Conulata
- Order: †Conularina
- Family: †Carinachitidae; He, 1987

Genera
- Carinachites Qian, 1977; Emeiconularia Qian et al., 1997; Pentaconularia

Extinct family of cnidarians

Carinachitidae is a family of small shelly fossils identified as cnidarian sclerites based on articulated specimens from the Kuanchuanpu formation.

They grade in morphology to conulariids.
