= Olivooides =

Olivooides Temporal range: Cambrian

Scientific classification
- Kingdom: Animalia
- Phylum: Cnidaria
- Class: Cubozoa
- Genus: †Olivooides; Qian 1977

Extinct microfossil from Cambrian strata

Olivooides is an extinct, sphere-shaped microfossil from Cambrian strata. Fossils are currently known only from China. Olivooides was approximately 600‐870 μm in diameter. It was an egg with a large yolk content. Fossils from Shaanxi, China can be found in the cleavage, gastrulation, organogenesis, cuticularization, pre‐hatching, post‐hatching and subsequent growth stages of development. This fossil is a result of soft-bodied preservation. Olivooides has pentaradial symmetry and is usually preserved by calcium phosphate endocast. The internal structure is rarely preserved. It has no larval stage, so it likely had a quick and direct development.

Little is known about which organisms Olivooides is related to. It has similarities to priapulid worms in the embryonic stages. Pentaradial symmetry can be seen in parts of the priapulid worms as well. However, Olivooides has one orifice that is assumed to have been both a mouth and anus. The priapulid worm has a complete gut.

Olivooides has also been compared to echinoderms based on its pentaradial symmetry, but this comparison is a bit far-fetched since echinoderms are not the only organisms to have pentaradial symmetry. It can also be seen in both priapulids and cnidarians. Olivooides does not have a calcite skeleton with a mesh structure, either.

Olivooides is most likely affiliated with cnidarians. Both have "an annulated conical test, fine longitudinal sculpture and a bluntly tapering apex with radial folds."

The fossils of Olivooides have shown some of the different developmental stages. Since they are ancient vertebrates, the developmental stages could show us how the spinal column was originally formed in vertebrate animals before major evolutionary changes happened. It was grouped together with Quadrapyrgites and Qinscyphus in the family Olivooidae and often compared with the conulariids.
