= Anabarites =

Anabarites Temporal range: lower Cambrian
- Fossil of Anabarites

Scientific classification
- Kingdom: Animalia
- Phylum: incertae sedis
- Family: †Anabaritidae
- Genus: †Anabarites; Missarzhevsky in Voronova & Missarzhevsky, 1969

Synonyms
- ?Kugdatheca Missarzhevsky in Rozanov et al., 1969; ?Tiksitheca Missarzhevsky in Rozanov et al., 1969; Angustiochrea Val'kov & Sysoev, 1970; Jakutiochrea Val'kov & Sysoev, 1970; ?Lobiochrea Val'kov & Sysoev, 1970; Anabaritellus Missarzhevsky, 1974; Udzhaites Vasil'eva, 1986; Kotuites Missarzhevsky, 1989; ?Sexangulatus Fedorov in Pel'man et al., 1990

Cambrian animal genus

Anabarites is a problematic lower Cambrian genus, and is one of the small shelly fossils. It was abundant in the early Tommotian and is also found in the Nemakit-Daldynian. The fossils represent the triradially symmetrical mineralised tube in which the organism dwelt; it was sedentary. It is named after the Anabar region in Yakutia, Russia; its name does not imply 'heavy'.

== Species ==
After Kouchinsky et al. (2009):

- A. biplicatus (Missarzhevsky, 1989)
- A. compositus Missarzhevsky in Rozanov et al., 1969
- A. convexus (Val'kov & Sysoev, 1970)
- A. dalirense Devaere et al., 2021
- A. hariolus (Vasil'eva, 1987)
- A. hexasulcatus (Missarzhevsky, 1974)
- A. korobovi (Missarzhevsky in Rozanov & Missarzhevsky, 1966)
- A. latus (Val'kov & Sysoev, 1970)
- ?A. licis (Missarzhevsky in Rozanov et al., 1969)
- A. missarzhevskyi (Vasil'eva, 1986)
- A. modestus Bokova, 1985
- ?A. natellus (Val'kov & Sysoev, 1970)
- A. rectus Vasil'eva in Rudavskaya & Vasil'eva, 1984
- A. ternarius Missarzhevsky in Rozanov et al., 1969
- A. tripartitus Missarzhevsky in Rozanov et al., 1969
- A. tristichuus Missarzhevsky in Rozanov et al., 1969
- A. trisulcatus Missarzhevsky in Voronova & Missarzhevsky, 1969
- A. valkovi (Bokova in Bokova & Vasil'eva, 1990)
- ?A. volutus (Missarzhevsky in Rozanov et al., 1969)
