= Anabaritid =

Anabaritid Temporal range: Early Cambrian (Possible Ediacarian Record*)

Scientific classification
- Kingdom: Animalia
- Phylum: incertae sedis
- Family: †Anabaritidae; Missarzhevsky, 1974

Genera
- Aculeochrea; Anabarites; Cambrotubulus; Mariochrea; Selindeochrea; Lobiochrea(?); Tiksitheca

Extinct family of enigmatic organisms

The anabaritids or angustiochreids are enigmatic tubular, mineralizing organisms with a trifold symmetry (i.e., clover shape) known from their Lower Cambrian fossils. They may have represented cnidaria, but their affinity within the Metazoa is difficult to constrain.

== Systematics ==
After Kouchinsky et al. (2009):

- Aculeochrea Val'kov & Sysoev, 1970
  - A. ornata Val'kov & Sysoev, 1970
  - A. rugosa (Val'kov & Sysoev, 1970)
- Anabarites Missarzhevsky in Voronova & Missarzhevsky, 1969
  - A. biplicatus (Missarzhevsky, 1989)
  - A. compositus Missarzhevsky in Rozanov et al., 1969
  - A. convexus (Val'kov & Sysoev, 1970)
  - A. dalirense Devaere et al., 2021
  - A. hariolus (Vasil'eva, 1987)
  - A. hexasulcatus (Missarzhevsky, 1974)
  - A. korobovi (Missarzhevsky in Rozanov & Missarzhevsky, 1966)
  - A. latus (Val'kov & Sysoev, 1970)
  - ?A. licis (Missarzhevsky in Rozanov et al., 1969)
  - A. missarzhevskyi (Vasil'eva, 1986)
  - A. modestus Bokova, 1985
  - ?A. natellus (Val'kov & Sysoev, 1970)
  - A. rectus Vasil'eva in Rudavskaya & Vasil'eva, 1984
  - A. ternarius Missarzhevsky in Rozanov et al., 1969
  - A. tripartitus Missarzhevsky in Rozanov et al., 1969
  - A. tristichuus Missarzhevsky in Rozanov et al., 1969
  - A. trisulcatus Missarzhevsky in Voronova & Missarzhevsky, 1969
  - A. valkovi (Bokova in Bokova & Vasil'eva, 1990)
  - ?A. volutus (Missarzhevsky in Rozanov et al., 1969)
- Cambrotubulus Missarzhevsky in Rozanov et al., 1969
  - C. decurvatus Missarzhevsky in Rozanov et al., 1969
- Mariochrea Val'kov, 1982
  - M. sinuosa Val'kov, 1982
- Selindeochrea Val'kov, 1982
  - S. tecta Val'kov, 1982
  - S. tricarinata (Missarzhevsky in Rozanov et al., 1969)
