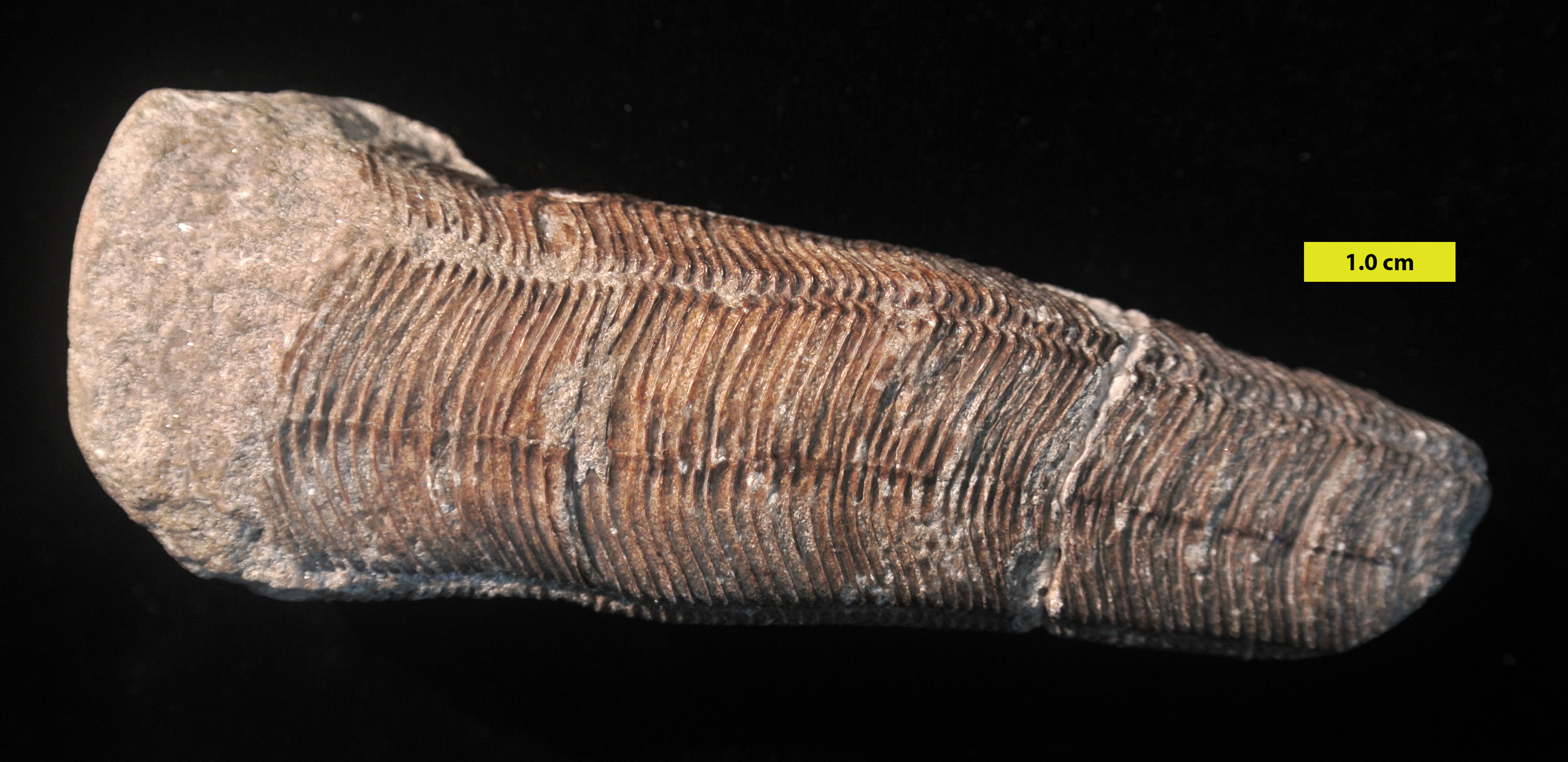
- Conulariid from the Mississippian (c. 360 to 325 mya) of Indiana; scale in mm.
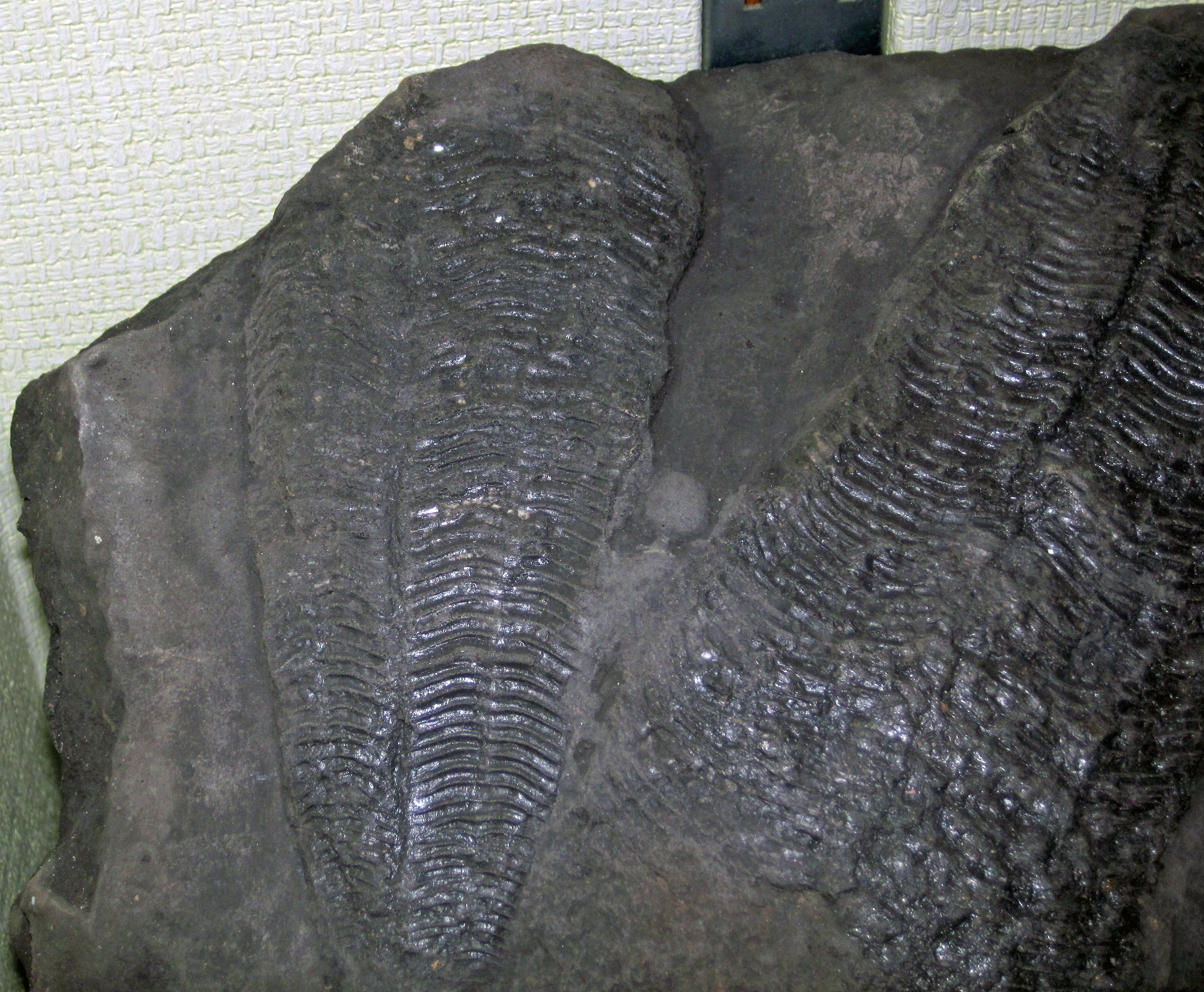
- Two Conularia gratiosa specimens from the Salem Limestone aged to the Middle Mississippian.

Scientific classification
- Kingdom: Animalia
- Phylum: Cnidaria
- Order: †Conulatae
- Clade: †Conulariida; Miller and Gurley, 1896

Genera
- See text.

= Conulariida =

Conulariida Temporal range: Late Ediacaran-late Triassic, 545–205 Ma

Extinct order of cnidarians

Conulariida are an extinct group of medusozoan cnidarians known from fossils spanning from the latest Ediacaran up until the Late Triassic. They are almost exclusively known from their hard external structures (alternatively referred to as a theca, periderm or test), which were pyramidal in shape and made up of numerous lamellae (thin layers). They are thought to have been sessile animals that grew with the narrower tip anchored to the seafloor, with the wider end bearing an array of tentacles used to ensnare prey.

== Structure ==
The conulariids are fossils preserved as shell-like structures made up of rows of calcium phosphate rods, resembling an ice-cream cone with fourfold symmetry, usually four prominently-grooved corners. New rods were added as the organism grew in length; the rod-based growth falsely gives the fossils a segmented appearance. Exceptional soft-part preservation has revealed that soft tentacles protruded from the wider end of the cone, and a holdfast from the pointed end attached the organisms to hard substrate. The prevailing reconstruction of the organism has it look superficially like a sea anemone sitting inside an angular, hard cone held perpendicular to the substrate. Conulariid shell is composed of francolite with carbonate ion concentration 8.1 wt%. The lattice parameters of conulariid apatite are a = 9.315(7) Å, c = 6.888(3) Å. The fine structure of their shell comprises multiple lamellae of alternately organic-rich and organic-poor layers.

== Fossil record ==
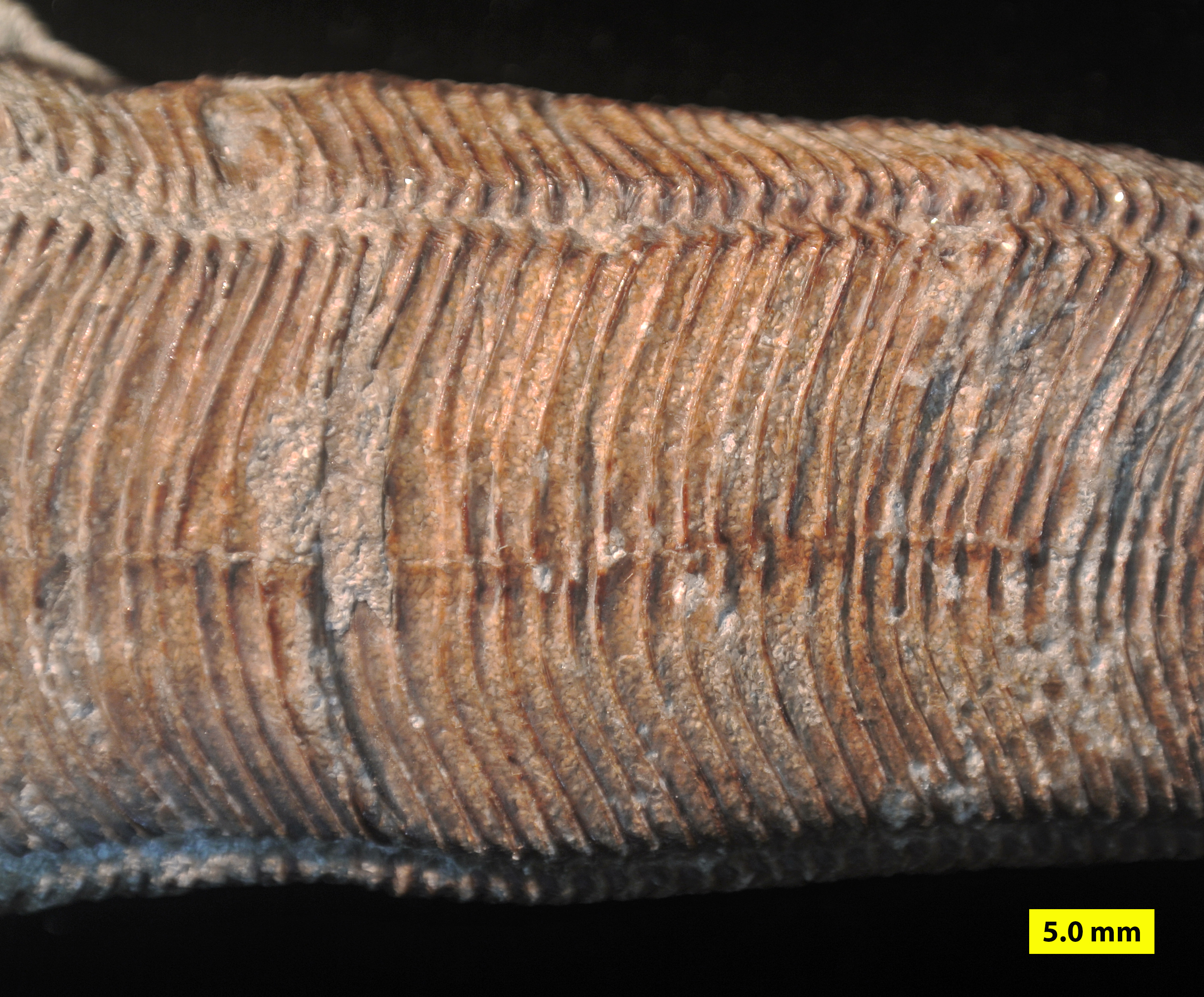
Close-up of a conulariid from the Mississippian of Indiana; scale in mm.

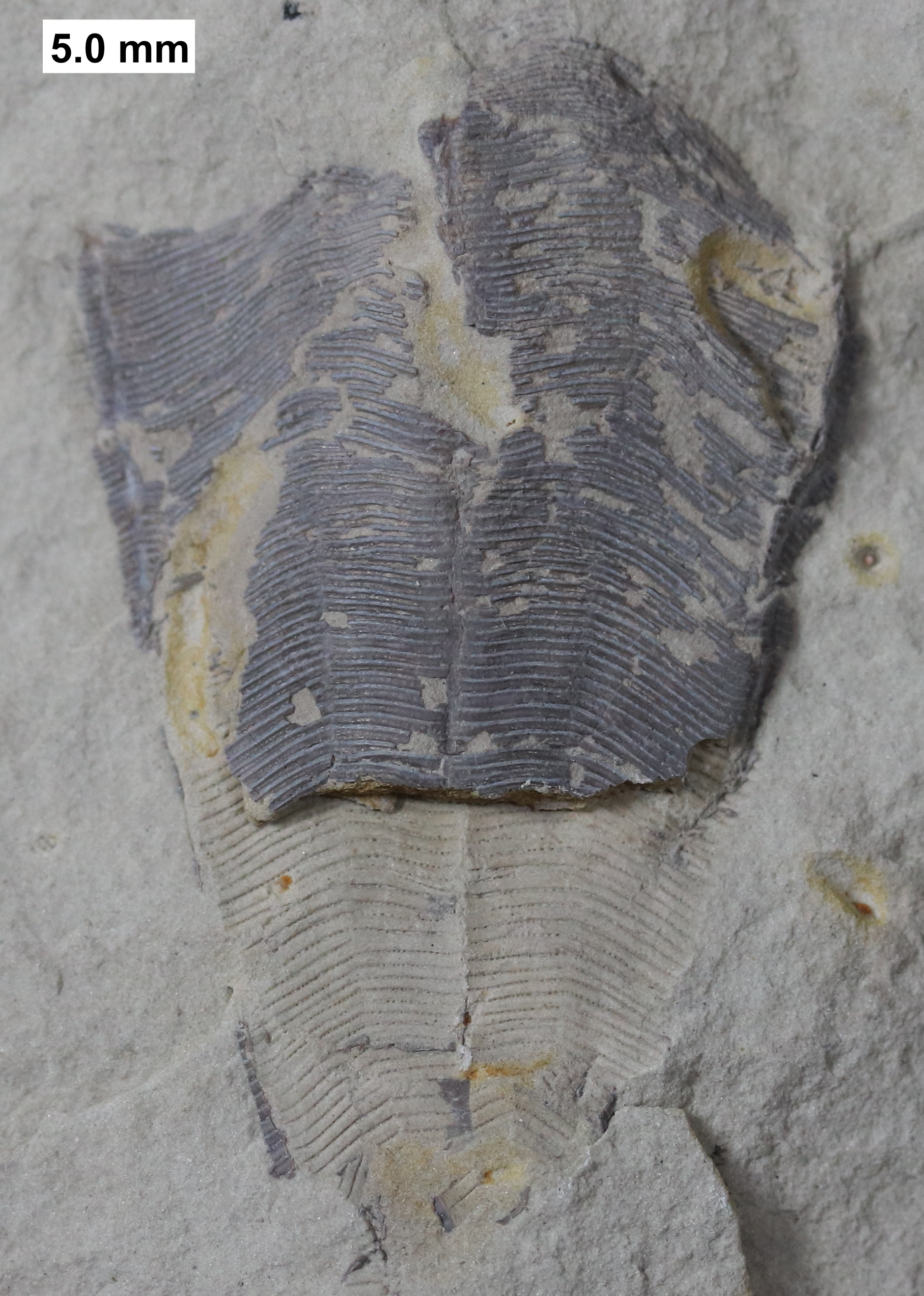
Conularia milwaukeensis from the Middle Devonian of Wisconsin.

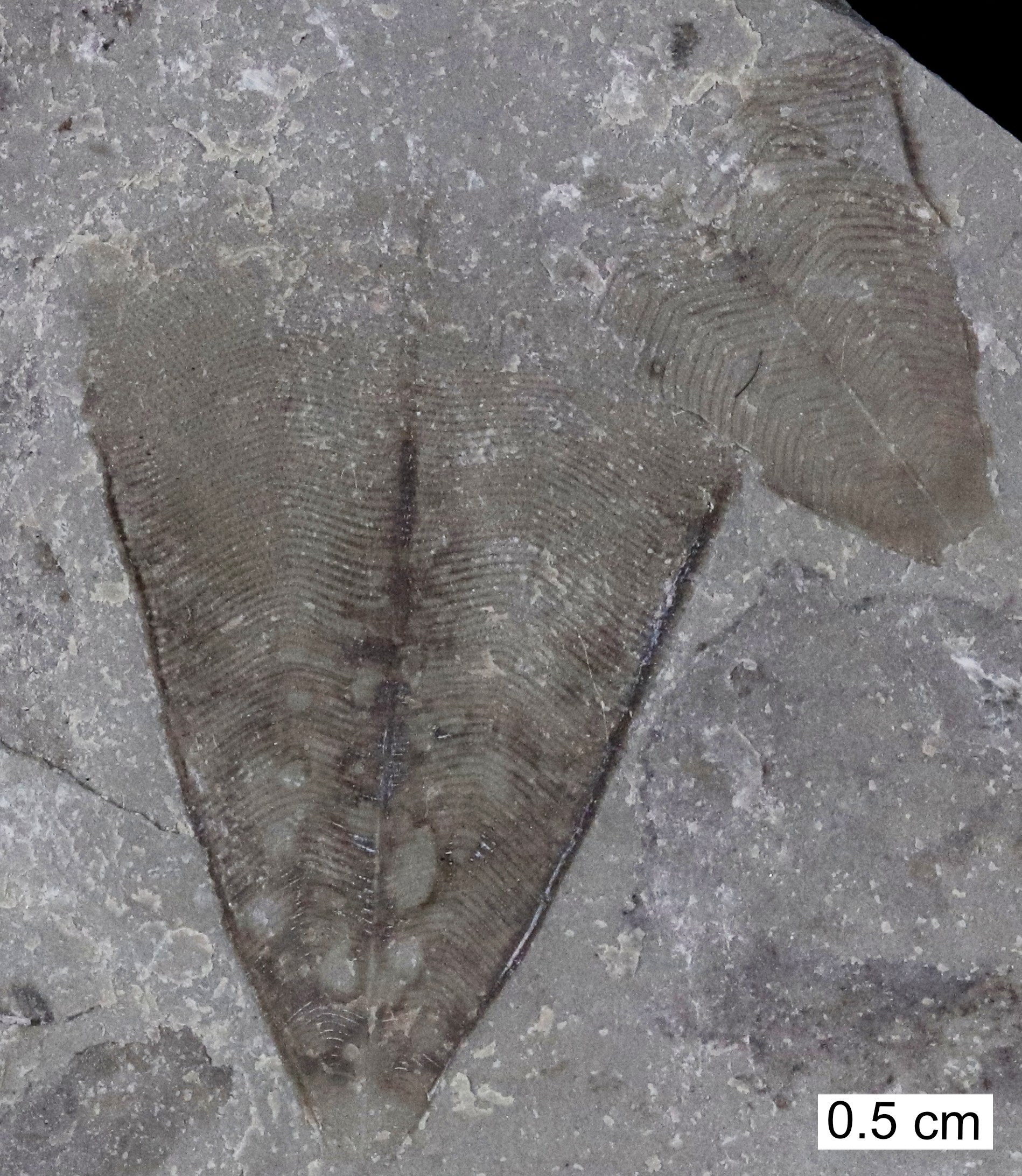
A pair of Conularia niagarensis specimens from the Lower Silurian Waukesha Biota site in Wisconsin.

With the inclusion of the possible Ediacaran conulariid Vendoconularia, which may or may not be a conulariid at all, and the definite late Ediacaran conulariid Paraconularia ediacara, the Conulata fossil record begins with undeniable specimens in the Upper Ediacaran and extends without significant break through numerous major mass extinctions. The Conulariids finally disappear from the fossil record during the Late Triassic, by which time they were very rare, with only 8 documented occurrences across the entire Triassic. Their extinction may have been due to the rise of durophagous organisms as part of the Mesozoic marine revolution.

In North America, conulariids are generally more common in rocks of Ordovician and Carboniferous age.

== Lifestyle ==
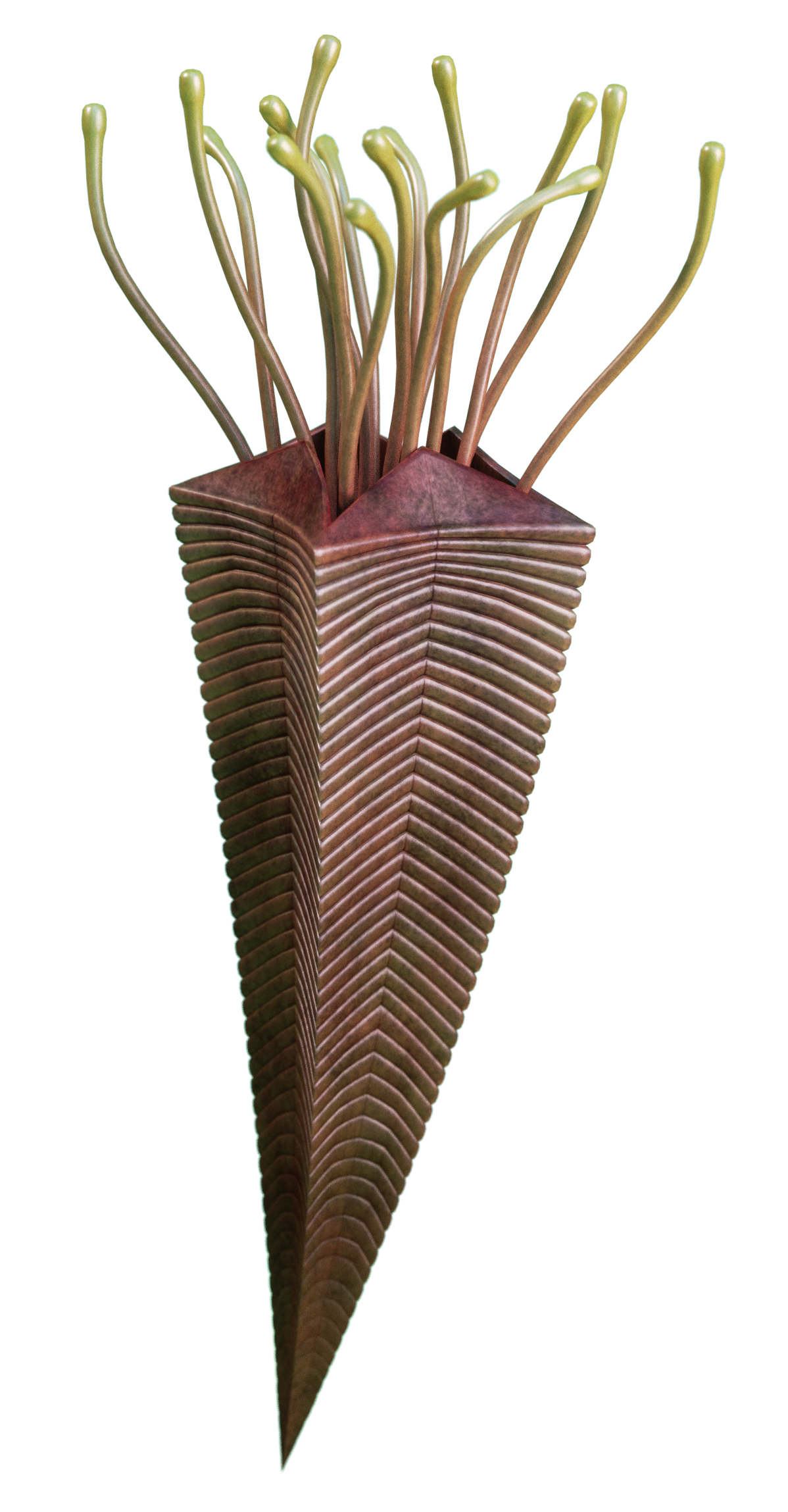
Life restoration of a conulariid, showing the soft-bodied anatomy

Conulariids were benthic animals that were sessile and attached to a substrate at the base of the theca, older individuals may have become recumbent (tipped over). They are generally proposed to have been predators, using tentacles to ensnare prey.

== Phylogeny ==
About 20 genera and 150 species are known, but except for local occurrences, conulariids are relatively uncommon.

The conulariids were originally thought to be anthozoan cnidarians. However, the lack of septa or other features diagnostic of anthozoans led researchers to abandon this hypothesis. Ivantsov and Fedonkin (2002) posit that the conulariids were ancestrally tri-radially symmetrical, as typified with Vendoconularia, typical of the structure seen in vendozoans. Conulariids are, however, technically a part of the Ediacaran biota as their fossil record starts at latest parts of that period.

It is now also thought that the conulate trilobozoans derived their fourfold symmetry from a sixfold symmetry, as seen in Vendoconularia. This in turn, is thought to be originally derived from an ancestral disk-like trilobozoan three-fold symmetry.

Until the 1930s, the affinities of conulariids were unknown. They were first proposed to be fossil scyphozoans by Helmut Kiderlen. Since then conulariids have generally been thought to be of Cnidarian affinity, either near the base of the cnidarian family tree or members of the subclade Medusozoa, though their exact placement within the clade is still uncertain.

== Pearls ==
Conulariids produced pearls within their shells, similar to the way molluscs such as oysters, other bivalves, and some gastropods do today. These pearls give a clue as to the internal anatomy of the conulariid animal. But due to their calcium phosphate composition, their crystal structure, and their extreme age, these pearls tend to be rather unattractive for use in or as decorative objects.

== List of genera ==
- Aciconularia
- Adesmoconularia
- Anaconularia
- Archaeoconularia
- Australoconularia
- Barbigodithreca
- Calloconularia
- Circonularia
- Climacoconus
- Conchopeltis
- Conomedusites?
- Conulariella
- Conularia
- Conularina
- Conulariopsis
- Ctenoconularia
- Diconularia
- Eoconularia
- Exoconularia
- Flectoconularia
- Garraconularia
- Glyptoconularia
- Gondaconularia
- Hexangulaconularia
- Holoconularia
- Mabianoconullus
- Mesoconularia
- Metaconularia
- Neoconularia
- Notoconularia
- Palaenigma
- Paraconularia
- Pseudoconularia
- Quadrosiphogonuchites
- Reticulaconularia
- Tasmanoconularia
- Vendoconularia
