= 2025 in paleontology =

Paleontology or palaeontology is the study of prehistoric life forms on Earth through the examination of plant and animal fossils. This includes the study of body fossils, tracks (ichnites), burrows, cast-off parts, fossilised feces (coprolites), palynomorphs and chemical residues. Because humans have encountered fossils for millennia, paleontology has a long history both before and after becoming formalized as a science. This article records significant discoveries and events related to paleontology that occurred or were published in the year 2025.

== Flora ==
=== Fungi ===
==== Newly named fungi ====
Name	Novelty	Status	Authors	Age	Type locality	Location	Notes	Image
Diplocladiella arambarriae	Sp. nov		Nuñez Otaño et al.	Holocene		Argentina		
Edaphagaricites	Gen. et sp. nov		Gobo et al.	Early Cretaceous	Crato Formation	Brazil	A member of the family Russulaceae. Genus includes new species E. conicus.	
Entopeltacites grojecensis	Sp. nov		Worobiec in Worobiec et al.	Middle Jurassic (Bathonian)		Poland		
Glomites bacatus	Sp. nov		Krings	Devonian	Rhynie chert	United Kingdom	A member of Glomeromycota.	
Insolitomyces	Gen. et sp. nov		Worobiec in Worobiec et al.	Middle Jurassic (Bathonian)		Poland	Genus includes new species I. ctenidis.	
Kiyamyces	Gen. et sp. nov		Maslova et al.	Cretaceous (Albian-Cenomanian)	Kiya Formation	Russia (Kemerovo Oblast)	A member of Dothideomycetes. Genus includes new species K. sequoiae.	
Megaglomerospora	Gen. et sp. nov		Correia, Sá & Pereira	Carboniferous	Vale da Mó Formation	Portugal	A member of Diversisporales. The type species is M. lealiae.	
Palaeoasterolibertia	Gen. et sp. nov		Bera et al.	Neogene		Bhutan	A member of the family Asterinaceae. Genus includes new species P. siwalika.	
Palaeomicrothyrium	Gen. et sp. nov		Kundu et al.	Miocene		India	A microthyriaceous fungus. The type species is P. miocenicum.	
Paleoophiocordyceps gerontoformicae	Sp. nov		Zhuang et al.	Cretaceous	Kachin amber	Myanmar		
Paleoophiocordyceps ironomyiae	Sp. nov		Zhuang et al.	Cretaceous	Kachin amber	Myanmar		
Ramanujamosporites	Gen. et sp. nov	Valid	Lanjewar, Puranik, Sakundarwar & Burghate in Saxena, Kirk & Lanjewar	Late Cretaceous	Deccan Intertrappean Beds	India	A fungus of uncertain affinities. The type species is R. mohgaoensis.	
Reymanomyces	Gen. et sp. nov		Worobiec in Worobiec et al.	Middle Jurassic (Bathonian)		Poland	Genus includes new species R. ctenidis.	
Rugososporomyces	Gen. et sp. nov		Strullu-Derrien & Schornack in Strullu-Derrien et al.	Devonian	Windyfield chert	United Kingdom	A member of Glomeromycetes. The type species is R. lavoisierae.	
Trichomerium palaeoindicum	Sp. nov		Kundu & Khan	Miocene		India	A member of Chaetothyriales belonging to the family Trichomeriaceae.	
Trichomerium palaeostauroconidium	Sp. nov		Kundu & Khan	Miocene		India	A member of Chaetothyriales belonging to the family Trichomeriaceae.	
Trichopeltinites zabierzowiensis	Sp. nov		Worobiec in Worobiec et al.	Middle Jurassic (Bathonian)		Poland		
Veterisphaera	Gen. et sp. nov	Valid	Moore & Krings	Devonian	Rhynie chert	United Kingdom	A fungal reproductive unit. The type species is V. dumosa.	
Zygosporium palaeomasonii	Sp. nov		Kundu & Khan	Miocene		India	A member of Xylariales belonging to the family Zygosporiaceae.	

==== Mycological research ====
- Szánthó et al. (2025) develop time-calibrated phylogeny of fungi on the basis of fossil and molecular data, providing new information on the age of the crown group of fungi and on the timing of their interactions with algal ancestors of embryophytes.
- Evidence from the study of fossil material of Spongiophyton nanum from the Devonian (Pragian-Emsian) Ponta Grossa Formation (Brazil), indicating that Spongiophyton is one of the earliest known lichenized macroscopic fungi, is presented by Becker-Kerber et al. (2025).
- Han et al. (2025) identify microtubes in bones of specimens of Keichousaurus from the Middle Triassic strata in China, preserved with geometric features typical of fungal hyphae, and identify the studied specimens as the earliest record of fungal-induced biomineralization in fossil bones reported to date.
- Tian et al. (2025) describe remains of fungi colonizing an insect-infested conifer wood from the Jurassic Tiaojishan Formation (China), interpreted as the oldest record of blue stain fungi reported to date.
- Tian et al. (2025) describe parasitic fungi infecting a podocarpaceous wood specimen from the Lower Cretaceous Yixian Formation (China), representing the first documented occurrence of fossil fungi in the Jehol Biota.
- Hodgson et al. (2025) present a global dataset of Cenozoic fungi records.

== Cnidarians ==
Name	Novelty	Status	Authors	Age	Type locality	Country	Notes	Images
Arenactinia	Gen. et sp. nov		Barroso et al.	Silurian	Ipu Formation	Brazil	A sea anemone. The type species is A. ipuensis.	
Cladochonus isaacmariai	Sp. nov	Valid	Ernst & May	Devonian (Lochkovian)	Birdsong Shale	United States (Tennessee)	A tabulate coral belonging to the family Pyrgiidae.	
Dendrophyllia mokiensis	Sp. nov	Valid	Tokuda, Yamada, Endo, Sentoku & Ezaki in Tokuda et al.	Miocene	Omori Formation	Japan	A species of Dendrophyllia.	
Dibunophylloides colligatus	Sp. nov	Valid	Fedorowski & Chwieduk	Carboniferous	Gaptank Formation	United States (Texas)	A rugose coral belonging to the group Stauriida and the family Aulophyllidae.	
Dibunophylloides complexus	Sp. nov	Valid	Fedorowski & Chwieduk	Carboniferous	Gaptank Formation	United States (Texas)	A rugose coral belonging to the group Stauriida and the family Aulophyllidae.	
Dibunophylloides differentialis	Sp. nov	Valid	Fedorowski & Chwieduk	Carboniferous	Gaptank Formation	United States (Texas)	A rugose coral belonging to the group Stauriida and the family Aulophyllidae.	
Dibunophylloides infirmis	Sp. nov	Valid	Fedorowski & Chwieduk	Carboniferous	Gaptank Formation	United States (Texas)	A rugose coral belonging to the group Stauriida and the family Aulophyllidae.	
Dibunophylloides parcus	Sp. nov	Valid	Fedorowski & Chwieduk	Carboniferous	Gaptank Formation	United States (Texas)	A rugose coral belonging to the group Stauriida and the family Aulophyllidae.	
Dibunophylloides similis	Sp. nov	Valid	Fedorowski & Chwieduk	Carboniferous	Gaptank Formation	United States (Texas)	A rugose coral belonging to the group Stauriida and the family Aulophyllidae.	
?Diploctenium chilensis	Sp. nov	Valid	Collado & Galleguillos	Paleocene	Trihueco Formation	Chile	A member of the family Meandrinidae.	
Favosites? herbigi	Sp. nov		Pohler, Hubmann & Kammerhofer	Devonian	Hunsrück Slate	Germany	A tabulate coral.	
Flabellum philippii	Nom. nov	Valid	Collado, Galleguillos & Hoeksema	Miocene		Chile	A species of Flabellum; a replacement name for Flabellum costatum Philippi (1887).	
Flabellum pirii	Nom. nov	Valid	Collado, Galleguillos & Hoeksema	Miocene		Chile	A species of Flabellum; a replacement name for Flabellum striatum Philippi (1887).	
Flabellum rachelis	Nom. nov	Valid	Collado, Galleguillos & Hoeksema	Eocene		United States (Alabama)	A species of Flabellum; a replacement name for Flabellum striatum Gabb & Horn (1860).	
Flabellum taveri	Nom. nov	Valid	Collado, Galleguillos & Hoeksema	Miocene		Chile	A species of Flabellum; a replacement name for Flabellum solidum Tavera Jerez (1979).	
Grypophyllum aubertae	Sp. nov	Valid	Denayer & Aretz	Devonian (Emsian)		France	A rugose coral belonging to the family Ptenophyllidae.	
Lepidophyllia (Heterastraea) microcalix	Sp. nov	Valid	Boivin, Lathuilière & Martini	Early Jurassic (Sinemurian and Pliensbachian, possibly also Hettangian)		Morocco	A stony coral belonging to the family Stylophyllidae.	
Macgeea tourneuri	Sp. nov	Valid	Denayer & Aretz	Devonian (Emsian)		France	A rugose coral belonging to the family Phillipsastreidae.	
Marejellia	Gen. et sp. nov	Valid	Žalohar, Gašparič & Hitij	Miocene		Slovenia	A member of Rhizostomeae of uncertain affinities. The type species is M. nereis.	
Marennophyllum kaufmanni	Sp. nov	Valid	Coen-Aubert	Devonian (Eifelian)		Morocco	A rugose coral belonging to the family Cystiphyllidae.	
Mespiluphyllia	Gen. et comb. nov	Valid	Löser, Cruz-Palma & Chesnel	Late Cretaceous (Maastrichtian)		Costa Rica	A coral belonging to the superfamily Misistelloidea. The type species is "Euphyllia" donatoi Aguilar & Denyer (2001).	
Michelinia rara	Sp. nov	Valid	Krutykh, Mirantsev & Rozhnov	Carboniferous (Gzhelian)		Russia	A tabulate coral. Published online in 2026, but the issue date is listed as December 2025.	
Michelinia umbogmaensis	Sp. nov		El-Desouky & Kora	Carboniferous (Viséan)	Um Bogma Formation	Egypt	A tabulate coral.	
Paraconularia balkhashensis	Sp. nov	Valid	Ohar & Dernov	Carboniferous (Bashkirian)	Kalmakemel' Formation	Kazakhstan	A member of Conulariida.	
Paracuifia castellum	Sp. nov	Valid	Boivin, Lathuilière & Martini	Early Jurassic (Sinemurian or Pliensbachian)		Morocco	A stony coral belonging to the family Cuifiidae.	
Pleurodictyum nerydelgadoi	Sp. nov	Valid	Domingos, Callapez & Legoinha	Devonian		Portugal	A tabulate coral.	
Richtereola guangxiensis	Sp. nov		Wright in Wright, Zhen & Lee	Devonian (Emsian)	Yukiang Formation	China	A rugose coral.	
Sericonularia	Gen. et sp. nov		Min, Zong & Wang	Silurian	Fentou Formation	China	A member of Conulariida. The type species is S. gemmata.	
Sinkiangopora yokoyamai	Sp. nov	Valid	Niko	Permian	Taishaku Limestone Group	Japan	A tabulate coral.	
Sinoceola	Gen. et sp. nov		Wright in Wright, Zhen & Lee	Devonian (Emsian)	Yukiang Formation	China	A rugose coral. Genus includes new species S. gracile.	
Siphonophrentis subaequalis	Sp. nov	Valid	Coen-Aubert	Devonian (Givetian)		Morocco	A rugose coral belonging to the family Siphonophrentidae.	
Sterictopathes seira	Sp. nov	Valid	Hao, Han, Baliński, Brugler & Song in Hao et al.	Ordovician	Xiliangsi Formation	China	A black coral.	
Stringophyllum pedderi	Sp. nov	Valid	Coen-Aubert	Devonian (Givetian)		Morocco	A rugose coral belonging to the family Stringophyllidae.	
Sutherlandia gzheliensis	Sp. nov	Valid	Krutykh, Mirantsev & Rozhnov	Carboniferous (Gzhelian)	Moscow Syneclise	Russia	A favositid coral. Published online in 2025, but the issue date is listed as December 2024.	
Tavsenicoralla	Gen. et sp. nov	Valid	Peel	Cambrian (Wuliuan)	Henson Gletscher Formation	Greenland	A coralomorph cnidarian. The type species is T. avannaa.	
Tiarasmilia lapidis	Sp. nov	Valid	Löser & Wilmsen	Late Cretaceous (Cenomanian)	Altamira Formation	Spain	A coral belonging to the superfamily Heterocoenioidea.	

=== Cnidarian research ===
- Probable evidence of cnidarian affinities of Salterella and Volborthella is presented by Vayda et al. (2025).
- Van Iten et al. (2025) revise the diversity of Ordovician (Floian) cnidarians from the Cabrières Biota (France), the taphonomy of their fossils and their modes of life.
- Evidence from the study of specimens of Sphenothallus cf. longissimus from the Ordovician (Katian) strata in Estonia, indicative of enhanced phosphatic biomineralization in the studied cnidarian, is presented by Vinn & Madison (2025).
- Ivantsov & Zakrevskaya (2025) study the morphology of Staurinidia crucicula, interpreted as supporting the affinities of the studied species with scyphomedusae.
- Wang & Cui (2025) revise the systematics of agetolitid tabulate corals.
- Zaika (2025) revises the fossil record of the tabulate coral Sarcinula in the Ordovician strata from the Baltic region, and argues that S. organum is the only member of this genus present in the studied area.
- Evidence from the study of Propora tubulata and Heliolites spongodes from the Silurian of Sweden and H. porosus from the Devonian of Morocco, indicating that corallite spacing in heliolitid corals was adaptable and partially controlled by their environment, is presented by Król (2025).
- Tube fragments which might represent the first fossils of tube-dwelling anemones reported to date are described from the Eocene to Oligocene strata in Washington (United States) by Kiel & Goedert (2025).
- A study on fossils of members of the genus Porites from the Miocene sites in Austria and Hungary, providing evidence of low calcification rates during the mid-Miocene climate warming that likely affected the formation and maintenance of coral reefs, is published by Reuter et al. (2025).
- A study on the fossil record of Cenozoic Caribbean corals, indicating that the largest turnovers of species and of traits that impact resilience coincided with climate and biogeographic changes, is published by Clay, Dunhill & Beger (2025).
- Evidence from the study of fossil record of Paleocene and Eocene Mediterranean corals, indicative of only partial alignment of coral trait responses to Paleocene–Eocene thermal maximum and Early Eocene Climatic Optimum with modern coral responses to climate changes, is presented by Bosellini, Mariani & Benedetti (2025).

== Bryozoans ==
Name	Novelty	Status	Authors	Age	Type locality	Location	Notes	Images
Catalinella	Gen. et comb. nov	Valid	Martha et al.	Paleocene		United States (New Jersey)	A cheilostome bryozoan. The type species is "Lepralia" undata Reuss (1872).	
Cellaria daniana	Sp. nov	Valid	López-Gappa et al.	Paleocene (Danian)	Roca Formation	Argentina	A species of Cellaria.	
Chenquepora	Gen. et sp. nov	Valid	Iturra, López-Gappa & Pérez	Miocene (Langhian)	Chenque Formation	Argentina	A member of Cheilostomatida belonging to the family Dysnoetoporidae. Genus includes new species C. miocenica.	
Dionella asynithisti	Sp. nov	Valid	Martha et al.	Paleocene	Vincentown Limesand	United States (New Jersey)	A cheilostome bryozoan.	
Distansescharella rancocasi	Sp. nov	Valid	Martha et al.	Paleocene	Vincentown Limesand	United States (New Jersey)	A cheilostome bryozoan.	
Euritina laterospinata	Sp. nov	Valid	Martha et al.	Paleocene	Vincentown Limesand	United States (New Jersey)	A cheilostome bryozoan.	
Fougaropora	Gen. et comb. nov	Valid	Martha et al.	Paleocene	Vincentown Limesand	United States (New Jersey)	A cheilostome bryozoan. The type species is "Stomatopora" temnichorda Ulrich & Bassler (1907).	
Gabbhornia	Gen. et comb. nov	Valid	Martha et al.	Paleocene	Vincentown Limesand	United States (New Jersey)	A cheilostome bryozoan. The type species is "Flustrella" capistrata Gabb & Horn (1862).	
Haplocephalopora foraminata	Nom. nov	Valid	Martha et al.	Paleocene	Vincentown Limesand	United States (New Jersey)	A cheilostome bryozoan.	
Hemistylus rostratum	Sp. nov	Valid	Martha et al.	Paleocene	Vincentown Limesand	United States (New Jersey)	A cheilostome bryozoan.	
Hemitrypa lui	Sp. nov	Valid	Ernst, Königshof & Wyse Jackson	Devonian (Famennian)	Samnuuruul Formation	China; Mongolia	A member of the family Fenestellidae.	
Iraidina dendroidea	Sp. nov		Ernst	Permian (Sakmarian and Artinskian)	Callytharra Formation	Australia	A trepostome bryozoan belonging to the family Dyscritellidae.	
Iraidina multicava	Sp. nov		Ernst	Permian (Artinskian)	Callytharra Formation	Australia	A trepostome bryozoan belonging to the family Dyscritellidae.	
Leiosellina pakhia	Sp. nov	Valid	Martha et al.	Paleocene	Vincentown Limesand	United States (New Jersey)	A cheilostome bryozoan.	
Megaloramfozoon	Gen. et comb. nov	Valid	Martha et al.	Paleocene	Vincentown Limesand	United States (New Jersey)	A cheilostome bryozoan. The type species is "Membranipora" nematoporoides Ulrich & Bassler (1907).	
Nakremella	Gen. et sp. nov	Valid	Ernst & May	Devonian (Lochkovian)	Birdsong Shale	United States (Tennessee)	A trepostome bryozoan belonging to the group Amplexoporina, possibly a member of the family Dyscritellidae. The type species is N. symbiotica.	
Nikiforopora haigi	Sp. nov		Ernst	Permian (Artinskian)	Callytharra Formation	Australia	A trepostome bryozoan belonging to the family Stenoporidae.	
Obsitacella	Gen. et comb. nov	Valid	Martha et al.	Paleocene	Vincentown Limesand	United States (New Jersey)	A cheilostome bryozoan. The type species is "Membranipora" jerseyensis Ulrich & Bassler (1907).	
Paraptylopora gondwanica	Sp. nov	Valid	Taboada, Pagani & Carrera	Carboniferous	Pampa de Tepuel Formation	Argentina		
Poricellaria karinae	Sp. nov	Valid	Martha et al.	Paleocene	Vincentown Limesand	United States (New Jersey)	A cheilostome bryozoan.	
Quadrilateralia	Gen. et comb. nov	Valid	Martha et al.	Paleocene	Vincentown Limesand	United States (New Jersey)	A cheilostome bryozoan. The type species is "Membranipora" nellioides Canu & Bassler (1933).	
Stavrozoon	Gen. et comb. nov	Valid	Martha et al.	Paleocene		United States (New Jersey)	A cheilostome bryozoan. The type species is "Lepralia" interposita Reuss (1872).	
Stephanollona ricoae	Sp. nov	Valid	Iturra, López-Gappa & Pérez	Miocene	Chenque Formation	Argentina	A member of the family Phidoloporidae.	
"Taractopora" klausbreitenbachi	Nom. nov	Valid	Martha et al.	Paleocene	Vincentown Limesand	United States (New Jersey)	A cheilostome bryozoan.	
Temachia canubassleri	Nom. nov	Valid	Martha et al.	Paleocene	Vincentown Limesand	United States (New Jersey)	A cheilostome bryozoan.	
Vincentownia	Gen. et comb. nov	Valid	Martha et al.	Paleocene	Vincentown Limesand	United States (New Jersey)	A cheilostome bryozoan. The type species is "Vincularia" acutirostris Canu & Bassler (1933).	
Xenikipora	Gen. et comb. nov	Valid	Martha et al.	Paleocene	Vincentown Limesand	United States (New Jersey)	A cheilostome bryozoan. The type species is "Kleidionella" trabeculifera Canu & Bassler (1933).	
Yadayadapora	Gen. et comb. nov	Valid	Martha et al.	Paleocene	Vincentown Limesand	United States (New Jersey)	A cheilostome bryozoan. The type species is "Beisselina" mortoni Canu & Bassler (1933).	
Zachosella	Gen. et comb. nov	Valid	Martha et al.	Paleocene	Vincentown Limesand	United States (New Jersey)	A cheilostome bryozoan. The type species is "Stichocados" mucronatus Canu & Bassler (1933).	

=== Bryozoan research ===
- Fossil material of large-bodied trepostome bryozoans belonging to the genus Tabulipora is described from the Permian Arizaro Formation (Argentina) by Carrera et al. (2025).
- Saulsbury et al. (2025) study the evolution of skeletal mineralogy in cheilostome bryozoans, and report evidence indicating that cheilostomes with partly or fully aragonitic skeletons evolved independently at least 50 times from calcitic ancestors.
- A new assemblage of Ordovician (Hirnantian) bryozoans, including taxa previously reported only from the Baltic region, is described from the Halevikdere Formation (Turkey) by Ernst, Hoşgör & Vinn (2025).
- Evidence of decreasing zooid size throughouth the evolutionary history of cyclostome bryozoans from the "Berenicea" lineage is presented by Ma, Liow & Taylor (2025).

== Brachiopods ==
Name	Novelty	Status	Authors	Age	Type locality	Country	Notes	Images
Apheoorthis talenti	Sp. nov		Brock, Zhang & Smith	Cambrian Stage 10	Ninmaroo Formation	Australia	A member of Orthida belonging to the family Eoorthidae.	
Aseptella tse	Sp. nov		Sour-Tovar, Quiroz-Barroso & Castillo Espinosa	Carboniferous (Viséan)	Santiago Formation	Mexico	A member of Productida belonging to the family Productellidae.	
Askepasma blysmochlidon	Sp. nov	Valid	Castle-Jones et al.	Cambrian Stage 2	Sellick Hill Formation	Australia	A member of Paterinata belonging to the group Paterinoidea.	
Bokotorthis tarimensis	Sp. nov	Valid	Zhang et al.	Ordovician		China		
Brachiosvalbardia archboldi	Sp. nov		Calle Salcedo, Cisterna & Halpern	Carboniferous (Pennsylvanian)	Quebrada Larga Formation	Argentina	A member of Productida.	
Bronnothyris attilavorosi	Sp. nov	Valid	Dulai	Miocene	Lajta Limestone Formation	Hungary	A member of Terebratulida belonging to the family Megathyrididae.	
Carinatina connorsi	Sp. nov	Valid	Baranov, Blodgett & Santucci	Devonian (Emsian)	Shellabarger Limestone	United States (Alaska)	A member of Atrypida belonging to the superfamily Davidsonioidea and the family Carinatinidae.	
Cathaysia plana	Sp. nov		Zhou et al.	Permian (Changhsingian)		China	A member of Productida.	
Cathaysia striata	Sp. nov		Zhou et al.	Permian (Changhsingian)		China	A member of Productida.	
Cathaysia xiaojiangensis	Sp. nov		Zhou et al.	Permian (Changhsingian)		China	A member of Productida.	
Conotreta canningensis	Sp. nov	Valid	Percival in Zhen et al.	Ordovician		Australia	A member of the family Acrotretidae.	
Coronalosia vergelae	Sp. nov		Calle Salcedo, Cisterna & Halpern	Carboniferous (Pennsylvanian)	Quebrada Larga Formation	Argentina	A member of Productida.	
Cyrtina koenigshofi	Sp. nov	Valid	Jansen	Devonian (Emsian)	Hohenrhein Formation	Germany	A member of Spiriferinida belonging to the family Cyrtinidae.	
Cyrtospirifer akimicus	Sp. nov	Valid	Oleneva & Sokiran	Devonian (Famennian)	Pozhnya Formation	Russia		
Dayia minuscula	Sp. nov	Valid	Mergl & Frýda	Silurian	Kopanina Formation	Czech Republic	A member of Athyridida belonging to the family Dayiidae.	
Drabovia? madmonensis	Sp. nov	Valid	Kim et al.	Ordovician (Katian)		Uzbekistan		
Dubatolovispirifer	Gen. et sp. nov	Valid	Baranov & Nikolaev	Devonian (Pragian)		Russia	A member of Spiriferida. The type species is D. ribbed. Published online in 2026, but the issue date is listed as December 2025.	
Golestania	Gen. et sp. nov	Valid	Baranov, Kebrie-ee Zade & Blodgett	Devonian (Famennian)	Khoshyeilagh Formation	Iran	A member of Spiriferida belonging to the family Ambocoelidae. The type species is G. shahrudus. Published online in 2026, but the issue date is listed as December 2025.	
Howellella gonensis	Sp. nov	Valid	Baranov & Nikolaev	Devonian (Pragian)		Russia	A member of Spiriferida.	
Howellella nelyudimica	Sp. nov	Valid	Baranov & Nikolaev	Devonian (Pragian)		Russia	A member of Spiriferida. Published online in 2026, but the issue date is listed as December 2025.	
Howellella septentrionalis	Sp. nov	Valid	Baranov & Nikolaev	Devonian (Pragian)		Russia	A member of Spiriferida. Published online in 2026, but the issue date is listed as December 2025.	
Iridistrophia maecuruensis	Sp. nov		Rezende et al.	Devonian	Maecuru Formation	Brazil		
Jakutoproductus allaraensis	Sp. nov	Valid	Makoshin & Kutygin	Carboniferous–Permian transition		Russia		
Jakutoproductus budnikovi	Sp. nov	Valid	Makoshin & Kutygin	Carboniferous–Permian transition		Russia		
Jakutoproductus rimmae	Sp. nov	Valid	Makoshin & Kutygin	Carboniferous–Permian transition		Russia		
Katzeria	Gen. et comb. nov	Junior homonym	Rezende et al.	Devonian		Brazil	A new genus for "Strophomena" hoeferi Katzer. The generic name is preoccupied by Katzeria Mendes (1966).	
Kirichkovia	Gen. et sp. nov	Valid	Baranov & Nikolaev	Devonian (Emsian)		Russia (Sakha Republic)	A member of Spiriferida belonging to the family Delthyrididae. The type species is K. sibirica.	
Kitaborthis	Gen. et comb. nov	Valid	Kim et al.	Ordovician		Austria; Italy; Uzbekistan	A member of the family Hesperorthidae. The type species is "Reuschella" asiatica Rozman (1978); genus also includes "Multicostella" schoenlaubi Havlíček in Havlíček, Kříž & Serpagli (1987).	
Lambdarina vangyrika	Sp. nov	Valid	Pakhnevich & Sobolev	Carboniferous (Tournaisian)		Russia (Komi Republic)	A member of Rhynchonellida belonging to the superfamily Lambdarinoidea. Published online in 2026, but the issue date is listed as December 2025.	
Linipalus andacolloensis	Pardo et sp. nov		Pardo et al.	Carboniferous	Huaraco Formation	Argentina		
Nalivkinathyris	Gen. et sp. nov	Valid	Baranov, Kebrie-ee Zade & Blodgett	Devonian (Famennian)	Khoshyeilagh Formation	Iran	A member of the family Athyrididae. The type species is N. damganensis. Published online in 2025, but the issue date is listed as December 2024.	
Paryphella yangshanensis	Sp. nov		Zhou et al.	Permian (Changhsingian)		China	A member of Productida.	
Pseudopholidops ingriana	Sp. nov	Valid	Popov et al.	Ordovician		Russia	A member of Craniopsida.	
Rakhmonomena	Gen. et sp. nov	Valid	Kim et al.	Ordovician (Katian)		Uzbekistan	Genus includes new species R. nataliae.	
Rugia stenius	Sp. nov	Valid	Surlyk	Late Cretaceous (Maastrichtian)		Denmark	A member of the family Chlidonophoridae.	
Spinatrypina mimsae	Sp. nov	Valid	Baranov, Blodgett & Santucci	Devonian (Emsian)	Shellabarger Limestone	United States (Alaska)	A member of Atrypida belonging to the family Atrypidae.	
Stricklandia lens nesensis	Ssp. nov		Baarli & Jin	Ordovician (Hirnantian)	Solvik Formation	Norway	A member of Pentamerida.	
Taphrodonta maralikhaensis	Sp. nov	Valid	Shcherbanenko & Sennikov	Ordovician (Darriwilian)		Russia	A member of Strophomenida.	
Terrakea koragoi	Sp. nov	Valid	Biakov et al.	Permian		Russia	A member of Productida.	
Torynelasma holmeri	Sp. nov	Valid	Percival in Zhen et al.	Ordovician	Nambeet Formation	Australia	A member of Acrotretida belonging to the family Torynelasmatidae.	
Trushelevia	Gen. et sp. nov	Valid	Baranov & Nikolaev	Devonian (Emsian)		Russia (Sakha Republic)	A member of Spiriferida belonging to the family Delthyrididae. The type species is T. yania.	
Wimanigma	Gen. et sp. nov	Valid	Betts et al.	Cambrian Stage 4	Probably File Haidar Formation	Europe (Baltic Sea region)	A stem-brachiopod belonging to the family Mickwitziidae. Genus includes new species W. soderarmensis.	
Xystostrophia agassizi	Comb. nov		(Rathbun)	Devonian	Ererê Formation	Brazil	Moved from Streptorhynchus agassizi Rathbun (1874).	
Zygospira idahoensis	Sp. nov	Valid	Vilela-Andrade in Vilela-Andrade et al.	Ordovician	Saturday Mountain Formation	United States (Idaho; Missouri)	A member of Atrypida belonging to the family Anazygidae.	

=== Brachiopod research ===
- Chen et al. (2025) report the discovery of new soft-bodied specimens of Lingulellotreta from the Cambrian Yuanshan Formation (China), providing evidence of presence of a mosaic of ancestral and modified anatomical features, and interpret the anatomy of Lingulellotreta as transitional between those of soft-bodied stem-brachiopods such as Yuganotheca and those of members of Lingulida.
- Evidence of preservation of epithelial cell impressions and moulds on the shell surface of Eohadrotreta zhenbaensis from the Cambrian Shuijingtuo Formation (China) is presented by Zhang et al. (2025).
- A study on the diversity dynamics of members of Plectambonitoidea throughout their evolutionary history is published by Candela, Guo & Harper (2025).
- Wright & Wagner (2025) argue that evolutionary histories of strophomenoid brachiopods implied by phylogenetic models that assume punctuated change are more probable than those implied by models that assume continuous change.
- Hennessey & Stigall (2025) link diversification trends of brachiopods from the Simpson Group (Oklahoma, United States) to global trends, reporting evidence of a rapid increase in shell volume of the studied brachiopods at the time of the main pulse of diversification during the Great Ordovician Biodiversification Event.
- Jin & Harper (2025) study the Darriwilian to Hirnantian brachiopod faunas from Laurentia, and link the vulnerability of brachiopods to extinction during the Late Ordovician mass extinction to endemism of the studied faunas, adaptations of the studied brachiopods to inland sea environment and loss of ability to disperse out of this habitat.
- A study on diversification of brachiopods after the Late Ordovician mass extinction is published by Huang, Chen & Shi (2025).
- Huang & Rong (2025) report evidence of preservation of setae in Nucleospira calypta from the Silurian (Telychian) strata in China, interpreted by the authors as used in active spacing regulation between members of the studied assemblage.
- Baarli & Mergl (2025) study the phylogenetic affinities of Karbous and Trigonatrypa, placing the former genus in the family Karpinskiidae and the latter one in the family Glassiidae.
- Shi et al. (2025) report the first discovery of silicified brachiopod fossils from the Permian (Kungurian−Roadian) strata of the Wandrawandian Siltstone (Australia), and reconstruct the taphonomic history of these fossils.
- Evidence of morphological adaptations of lingulid brachiopods to environmental changes during the Early Triassic is presented by Wu et al. (2025).
- Carlson et al. (2025) evaluate the impact of use of different phylogenetic methods on reconstructions of relationships and evolution of morphological characters in Athyridida.
- A study on the taxonomic diversity of Mediterranean brachiopods throughout the Jurassic and Early Cretaceous, providing evidence of faunal losses coinciding with oceanic anoxic events, is published by Vörös & Szives (2025).
- A study on the diversity dynamics of brachiopods throughout the Paleogene is published by Ruban (2025), who finds possible evidence of impact of climate changes on brachiopod diversity during the Paleocene but not during the Eocene-Oligocene.

== Echinoderms ==
Name	Novelty	Status	Authors	Age	Type locality	Country	Notes	Images
Afanasievocrinus	Gen. et sp. nov	Valid	Mirantsev	Carboniferous (Kasimovian)	Neverovo Formation	Russia	A crinoid. Genus includes new species A. pentagonalis. Published online in 2026, but the issue date is listed as November 2025.	
Allosocrinus moscoviensis	Sp. nov	Valid	Mirantsev	Carboniferous (Kasimovian)	Neverovo Formation	Russia	A crinoid. Published online in 2026, but the issue date is listed as November 2025.	
Angioblastus omanensis	Sp. nov	Valid	Webster et al.	Permian (Kungurian)		Oman	A blastoid belonging to the family Codasteridae.	
Angioblastus qararii	Sp. nov	Valid	Webster et al.	Permian (Kungurian)		Oman	A blastoid belonging to the family Codasteridae.	
Anticosticrinus	Gen. et sp. nov	Valid	Cole, Wright & Hopkins	Ordovician–Silurian transition (most likely Hirnantian)	Ellis Bay Formation or Becscie Formation	Canada (Quebec)	A cladid crinoid belonging to the order Sagenocrinida and the family Anisocrinidae. The type species is A. natiscotecensis.	
Apographiocrinus convexus	Sp. nov	Valid	Mirantsev	Carboniferous (Kasimovian)	Neverovo Formation	Russia	A crinoid. Published online in 2026, but the issue date is listed as November 2025.	
Astropecten erectus	Sp. nov	Valid	Gale	Late Cretaceous (Campanian)	Kristianstad Basin	Sweden	A possible species of Astropecten.	
Atlascystis	Gen. et sp. nov	Valid	Woodgate et al.	Cambrian Stage 4–Wuliuan	Jbel Wawrmast Formation	Morocco	A member of Ctenocystoidea. The type species is A. acantha.	
Autaveniaster	Gen. et sp. nov		Delemar & Villier	Eocene (Lutetian)		France	A starfish belonging to the family Goniasteridae. The type species is A. wozniaki.	
Baltocrinus semenovi	Sp. nov	Valid	Rozhnov & Terentyev	Ordovician		Russia (Leningrad Oblast)	A crinoid belonging to the family Iocrinidae.	
Bartelsaster	Gen. et sp. nov		Blake & Lintz	Devonian	Hunsrück Slate	Germany	A member of Asterozoa belonging to the group Stenuroidea and the family Erinaceasteridae. The type species is B. lineatus.	
Borszczia	Gen. et sp. et comb. nov	Valid	Pauly & Villier	Middle Jurassic (Callovian) to Early Cretaceous (Hauterivian)	Ornatenton Formation	France; Germany; United Kingdom	A starfish belonging to the order Paxillosida and the suborder Cribellina. The type species is B. wallueckensis; genus also includes "Chrispaulia" jurassica Gale (2011) and "Chrispaulia" spinosa Gale & Jagt (2021).	
Brabeocrinus costatus	Sp. nov	Valid	Mirantsev	Carboniferous (Kasimovian)	Neverovo Formation	Russia	A crinoid. Published online in 2026, but the issue date is listed as November 2025.	
Brechincycloides	Gen. et sp. nov	Valid	Kolata et al.	Ordovician (Katian)		Canada (Ontario)	A member of Cyclocystoidea, the type genus of the new family Brechincycloididae. The type species is B. stanhynei.	
Brightonicystis salmoensis	Comb. nov	Valid	(Sheffield, Ausich & Sumrall)	Ordovician (Hirnantian)	Ellis Bay Formation	Canada (Quebec)	A blastozoan belonging to the group Diploporita and the family Holocystitidae; moved from Holocystites salmoensis Sheffield, Ausich & Sumrall.	
Brissus jonesi	Sp. nov	Valid	Osborn, Portell & Mooi	Eocene	Ocala Limestone	United States (Florida)	A species of Brissus.	
Castaneametra	Gen. et sp. nov	Valid	Saulsbury, Baumiller & Sprinkle	Early Cretaceous (Albian)	Glen Rose Formation	United States (Texas)	A crinoid belonging to the group Comatulida and the family Notocrinidae. The type species is C. hodgesi.	
Cemgiganticrinus	Gen. et sp. nov	Valid	Mirantsev	Carboniferous (Kasimovian)	Neverovo Formation	Russia	A crinoid. Genus includes new species C. popovorum. Published online in 2026, but the issue date is listed as November 2025.	
Cherbonniericrinus pliocenicus	Sp. nov	Valid	Roux, Thuy & Gale	Pliocene		Indian Ocean (Rodrigues Ridge)	A crinoid belonging to the family Rhizocrinidae.	
?Chlidonocrinus medvedkaensis	Sp. nov	Valid	Mirantsev	Carboniferous (Kasimovian)	Neverovo Formation	Russia	A crinoid. Published online in 2026, but the issue date is listed as November 2025.	
Coenholectypus sulcatus	Sp. nov		Schlüter et al.	Late Cretaceous (Coniacian)		Algeria	A sea urchin.	
Coronataster	Gen. et comb. nov	Valid	Gale & Cottard	Late Cretaceous (Cenomanian)	Probably Zig Zag Chalk Formation	United Kingdom	A starfish belonging to the family Stauranderasteridae. The type species is "Oreaster" coronatus Forbes (1848).	
Coulonia fournoui	Sp. nov	Valid	Gale & Cottard	Late Cretaceous (Turonian)		France	A starfish belonging to the family Astropectinidae.	
Covidaster	Gen. et sp. nov	Valid	Smith et al.	Carboniferous (Serpukhovian)	Big Clifty Formation	United States (Indiana)	A brittle star. The type species is C. medicus.	
Crassicoma suedica	Sp. nov	Valid	Gale & Stevenson	Late Cretaceous (Campanian)	Kristianstad Basin	Sweden	A crinoid belonging to the group Roveacrinida and the family Saccocomidae.	
Crielaster	Gen. et sp. nov	Valid	Gale & Cottard	Late Cretaceous (Turonian to Campanian)		France; United Kingdom	A starfish belonging to the family Chaetasteridae. The type species is C. annae.	
Deltoblastus sevastopuloi	Sp. nov	Valid	Webster et al.	Permian (Kungurian)		Oman	A blastoid belonging to the group Granatocrinida.	
Diademopsis wallueckensis	Sp. nov	Valid	Pauly	Middle Jurassic (Callovian)	Ornatenton Formation	Germany	A sea urchin belonging to the family Pedinidae.	
Disgregacrinus	Gen. et sp. nov	Valid	Webster et al.	Permian (Kungurian)		Oman	A crinoid belonging to the group Eucladida and the family Staphylocrinidae. The type species is D. aridus.	
Durhamella tetrapora	Sp. nov	Valid	Osborn, Portell & Mooi	Eocene	Ocala Limestone	United States (Florida)	A sea urchin belonging to the family Neolaganidae.	
Elibatocrinus gracilis	Sp. nov	Valid	Mirantsev	Carboniferous (Kasimovian)	Neverovo Formation	Russia	A crinoid. Published online in 2026, but the issue date is listed as November 2025.	
Eoindocrinus ageri	Sp. nov	Valid	Webster et al.	Permian (Kungurian)		Oman	A crinoid belonging to the group Eucladida and the family Indocrinidae.	
Eoindocrinus spinosus	Sp. nov	Valid	Webster et al.	Permian (Kungurian)		Oman	A crinoid belonging to the group Eucladida and the family Indocrinidae.	
Eupatagus dumonti	Sp. nov	Valid	Osborn, Portell & Mooi	Oligocene	Suwannee Limestone	United States (Florida)	A sea urchin belonging to the family Eupatagidae.	
Exoriocrinus pseudorugosus	Sp. nov	Valid	Mirantsev	Carboniferous (Kasimovian)	Neverovo Formation	Russia	A crinoid. Published online in 2026, but the issue date is listed as November 2025.	
Furcaster coulombeae	Sp. nov	Valid	Smith et al.	Carboniferous (Serpukhovian)	Big Clifty Formation	United States (Indiana)	A brittle star.	
Furcaster mccantae	Sp. nov	Valid	Smith et al.	Carboniferous (Serpukhovian)	Big Clifty Formation	United States (Indiana)	A brittle star.	
Furcaster wardi	Sp. nov	Valid	Smith et al.	Carboniferous (Serpukhovian)	Big Clifty Formation	United States (Indiana)	A brittle star.	
Gasterocoma americana	Comb. nov	Valid	(Hall)	Devonian		United States (New York)	A crinoid belonging to the group Eucladida; moved from Myrtillocrinus americanus Hall.	
Gasterocoma briareus	Comb. nov	Valid	(Schultze)	Devonian		Germany	A crinoid belonging to the group Eucladida; moved from Taxocrinus briareus Schultze.	
Gasterocoma curta	Comb. nov	Valid	(Schmidt)	Devonian		Germany	A crinoid belonging to the group Eucladida; moved from Myrtillocrinus curtus Schmidt.	
Gasterocoma eifeliana	Comb. nov	Valid	(Müller)	Devonian		Germany	A crinoid belonging to the group Eucladida; moved from Lecythocrinus eifelianus Müller.	
Gasterocoma eifeliense	Comb. nov	Valid	(Müller)	Devonian		Germany	A crinoid belonging to the group Eucladida; moved from Ceramocrinus eifeliensis Müller.	
Gasterocoma elongata	Comb. nov	Valid	(Sandberger & Sandberger)	Devonian		Germany	A crinoid belonging to the group Eucladida; moved from Myrtillocrinus elongatus Sandberger & Sandberger.	
Gasterocoma extensa	Comb. nov	Valid	(Wachsmuth & Springer)	Devonian		United States (Ohio)	A crinoid belonging to the group Eucladida; moved from Arachnocrinus extensus Wachsmuth & Springer.	
Gasterocoma ignota	Comb. nov	Valid	(Stauffer)	Devonian		Canada (Ontario)	A crinoid belonging to the group Eucladida; moved from Arachnocrinus ignotus Stauffer.	
Gasterocoma knappi	Comb. nov	Valid	(Wachsmuth & Springer)	Devonian		United States (Indiana)	A crinoid belonging to the group Eucladida; moved from Arachnocrinus knappi Wachsmuth & Springer.	
Gasterocoma onondagensis	Nom. nov	Valid	Bohatý, Ausich & Ebert	Devonian		United States (New York)	A crinoid belonging to the group Eucladida; a replacement name for Schultzicrinus(?) elongatus Springer.	
Gasterocoma orbiculata	Comb. nov	Valid	(Dubatolova)	Devonian		Russia	A crinoid belonging to the group Eucladida; moved from Myrtillocrinus orbiculatus Dubatolova.	
Gasterocoma (?) robusta	Comb. nov	Valid	(Goldring)	Devonian		United States (New York)	A crinoid belonging to the group Eucladida; moved from Mictocrinus robustus Goldring.	
Gracilicrinus	Gen. et sp. nov	Valid	Mirantsev	Carboniferous (Kasimovian)	Neverovo Formation	Russia	A crinoid. Genus includes new species G. chertanovoensis. Published online in 2026, but the issue date is listed as November 2025.	
Granulasterias	Gen. et sp. nov	Valid	Gale	Late Cretaceous (Campanian)	Kristianstad Basin	Sweden	A starfish belonging to the family Asteriidae. The type species is G. ivoensis.	
Haccourtaster berryensis	Sp. nov	Valid	Gale & Jagt	Late Cretaceous (Turonian)		United Kingdom	A member of the family Goniasteridae.	
Haccourtaster liticola	Sp. nov	Valid	Gale & Jagt	Late Cretaceous (Campanian)		Sweden	A member of the family Goniasteridae.	
Haccourtaster nattestadae	Sp. nov	Valid	Gale & Jagt	Late Cretaceous (Coniacian)		Denmark	A member of the family Goniasteridae.	
Halogetocrinus yakovlevi	Sp. nov	Valid	Mirantsev	Carboniferous (Kasimovian)	Neverovo Formation	Russia	A crinoid. Published online in 2026, but the issue date is listed as November 2025.	
Ivoaster	Gen. et sp. nov	Valid	Gale	Late Cretaceous (Campanian)	Kristianstad Basin	Sweden	A starfish belonging to the family Goniasteridae. The type species is I. soerensenae.	
Jaramahcrinus	Gen. et sp. nov	Valid	Webster et al.	Permian (Kungurian)		Oman	A crinoid belonging to the group Eucladida and the family Erisocrinidae. The type species is J. warlichi.	
Kukrusecrinus	Gen. et sp. nov	Valid	Rozhnov	Ordovician (Darriwilian and Sandbian)		Estonia	A crinoid belonging to group Camerata and to the family Colpodecrinidae. The type species is K. stellatus. Published online in 2025, but the issue date is listed as December 2024.	
Lavacystis	Gen. et sp. nov	Valid	Rozhnov	Ordovician (Floian)		Russia	A member of Rhombifera belonging to the family Pleurocystitidae. Genus includes new species L. sagittalis. Published online in 2026, but the issue date is listed as December 2025.	
Manfredaster graveseni	Sp. nov	Valid	Gale	Late Cretaceous (Campanian)	Kristianstad Basin	Sweden	A starfish belonging to the family Stauranderasteridae.	
Maxaster	Nom. nov		Blake & Lintz	Devonian	Hunsrück Slate	Germany	A member of Asterozoa belonging to the group Stenuroidea and the family Erinaceasteridae. The type species is "Erinaceaster" giganteus Lehmann (1957).	
Metopaster asgaardae	Sp. nov	Valid	Gale	Late Cretaceous (Campanian)	Kristianstad Basin	Sweden		
Moyacystis	Gen. et comb. nov	Valid	Paul	Silurian	Lewisburg Formation	United States (Indiana)	A blastozoan belonging to the group Diploporita and the family Holocystitidae. The type species is "Osgoodicystis" cooperi Frest & Strimple in Frest et al. (2011).	
Neoholaster	Gen. et sp. nov	Valid	Borghi et al.	Miocene		Italy	A sea urchin. Genus includes new species N. albensis.	
Neverovocrinus	Gen. et sp. nov	Valid	Mirantsev	Carboniferous (Kasimovian)	Neverovo Formation	Russia	A crinoid. Genus includes new species N. decadoramosus. Published online in 2026, but the issue date is listed as November 2025.	
Nipponicrinus	Gen. et 2 sp. nov	Valid	Keyes, Wright & Ausich	Carboniferous (Moscovian)	Akiyoshi Limestone Group	Japan	A camerate crinoid belonging to the group Monobathrida and the family Paragaricocrinidae. The type species is N. hashimotoi; genus also includes N. akiyoshiensis.	
Nymphaster macrogranularis	Sp. nov	Valid	Gale	Late Cretaceous (Campanian)	Kristianstad Basin	Sweden	A species of Nymphaster.	
Nymphaster minigranularis	Sp. nov	Valid	Gale	Late Cretaceous (Campanian)	Kristianstad Basin	Sweden	A species of Nymphaster.	
Orthopsis metliliae	Sp. nov		Schlüter et al.	Late Cretaceous (Coniacian)		Algeria	A sea urchin.	
Palenciacrinus	Gen. et sp. nov	Valid	Keyes, Wright & Ausich	Carboniferous (Moscovian)		Spain	A camerate crinoid belonging to the group Monobathrida and the family Paragaricocrinidae. The type species is P. mudaensis.	
Paraconocrinus rodriguesensis	Sp. nov	Valid	Roux, Thuy & Gale	Pliocene		Indian Ocean (Rodrigues Ridge)	A crinoid belonging to the family Rhizocrinidae.	
Paranacystis? kernevodezensis	Sp. nov	Valid	Lefebvre et al.	Devonian (Givetian)	Kerbelec Formation	France	A mitrate belonging to the family Paranacystidae.	
Persoonaster	Gen. et comb. nov	Valid	Thuy, Numberger-Thuy & Gale	Early Jurassic (Hettangian)		Belgium	A brittle star, a member of the stem group of Euryalida related to the Triassic genus Aspiduriella. The type species is "Mesophiomusium" kianiae Thuy (2005).	
Plagiobrissus cassadyi	Sp. nov	Valid	Osborn, Portell & Mooi	Oligocene	Marianna Limestone	United States (Florida)	A species of Plagiobrissus.	
Pleurocrinus omanensis	Comb. nov	Valid	(Webster & Sevastopulo)	Permian		Oman	A camerate crinoid belonging to the group Monobathrida and the family Platycrinitidae; moved from Platycrinites omanensis Webster & Sevastopulo (2007)	
Plumaster echinoides	Sp. nov	Valid	Pauly & Villier	Middle Jurassic (Callovian)	Ornatenton Formation	Germany	A starfish belonging to the family Plumasteridae.	
Polycidaris vadeti	Sp. nov	Valid	Pauly	Middle Jurassic (Callovian)	Ornatenton Formation	Germany	A sea urchin belonging to the group Cidaroida and the family Polycidaridae.	
Prionocidaris robertsi	Sp. nov	Valid	Osborn, Portell & Mooi	Eocene	Ocala Limestone	United States (Florida)	A species of Prionocidaris.	
Procidaris relicta	Sp. nov	Valid	Pauly	Middle Jurassic (Callovian)	Ornatenton Formation	Germany	A sea urchin belonging to the group Cidaroida and the family Miocidaridae.	
Proindocrinus riesae	Sp. nov	Valid	Webster et al.	Permian (Kungurian)		Oman	A crinoid belonging to the group Eucladida and the family Indocrinidae.	
Pulcheracrinus	Gen. et comb. nov	Valid	Keyes, Wright & Ausich	Carboniferous (Bashkirian)	Brentwood Limestone	United States (Oklahoma)	A camerate crinoid belonging to the group Monobathrida and the family Paragaricocrinidae. The type species is "Megaliocrinus" exotericus Strimple (1951).	
Pycinaster christenseni	Sp. nov	Valid	Gale	Late Cretaceous (Campanian)	Kristianstad Basin	Sweden	A starfish belonging to the family Pycinasteridae.	
Qararicrinus	Gen. et sp. nov	Valid	Webster et al.	Permian (Kungurian)		Oman	A crinoid belonging to the group Eucladida and the family Erisocrinidae. The type species is Q. batainensis.	
Remaster cretaceus	Sp. nov	Valid	Gale	Late Cretaceous (Campanian)	Kristianstad Basin	Sweden	A starfish belonging to the family Korethrasteridae.	
Rhyncholampas bao	Sp. nov	Valid	Osborn, Portell & Mooi	Eocene	Ocala Limestone	United States (Florida)	A species of Rhyncholampas.	
Rhyncholampas mariannaensis	Sp. nov	Valid	Osborn, Portell & Mooi	Eocene	Ocala Limestone	United States (Florida)	A species of Rhyncholampas.	
Roemerocrinus? aridus	Sp. nov	Valid	Webster et al.	Permian (Kungurian)		Oman	A crinoid belonging to the group Eucladida and the family Scytalocrinidae.	
Rugametopaster	Gen. et comb. nov	Valid	Gale	Late Cretaceous (Santonian to Campanian)	Kristianstad Basin	Sweden	A starfish belonging to the family Goniasteridae. The type species is "Metopaster" rugissimus Gale (1987).	
Scaniasterina	Gen. et sp. nov	Valid	Gale	Late Cretaceous (Campanian)	Kristianstad Basin	Sweden	A starfish belonging to the family Asterinidae. The type species is S. surlyki.	
Schizaster carlsoni	Sp. nov	Valid	Osborn, Portell & Mooi	Oligocene	Suwannee Limestone	United States (Florida)	A species of Schizaster.	
Schoenaster limbeckae	Sp. nov	Valid	Smith et al.	Carboniferous (Serpukhovian)	Big Clifty Formation	United States (Indiana)	A brittle star.	
Semiometra alveoradiata	Sp. nov	Valid	Saulsbury, Baumiller & Sprinkle	Early Cretaceous (Albian)	Glen Rose Formation	United States (Texas)	A crinoid belonging to the group Comatulida and the family Notocrinidae.	
Sprinkleoglobus spencensis	Comb. nov	Valid	(Wen et al.)	Cambrian (Wuliuan)	Spence Shale	United States (Idaho; Utah)	A member of Edrioasteroidea; moved from Totiglobus spencensis Wen et al. (2019).	
Squamataster	Gen. et comb. nov	Valid	Gale & Cottard	Late Cretaceous	Probably Seaford Chalk Formation	Denmark; Germany; United Kingdom	A starfish belonging to the family Stauranderasteridae. The type species is "Oreaster" squamatus Forbes (1848); genus also includes "Stauranderaster" doreckae Schulz & Weitschat (1971) and "Stauranderaster" speculum Nielsen (1943).	
Stauranderaster pustulosus	Sp. nov	Valid	Gale & Cottard	Late Cretaceous (Turonian)		France	A starfish belonging to the family Stauranderasteridae.	
Strataster lisae	Sp. nov	Valid	Smith et al.	Carboniferous (Serpukhovian)	Big Clifty Formation	United States (Indiana)	A brittle star.	
Suchaster	Gen. et sp. nov	Valid	Smith et al.	Carboniferous (Serpukhovian)	Big Clifty Formation	United States (Indiana)	A brittle star. The type species is S. granulosus.	
Sukhanovocrinus	Gen. et sp. nov	Valid	Mirantsev	Carboniferous (Kasimovian)	Neverovo Formation	Russia	A crinoid. Genus includes new species S. parvus. Published online in 2026, but the issue date is listed as November 2025.	
Sulcatocrinus	Gen. et sp. nov	Valid	Mirantsev	Carboniferous (Kasimovian)	Neverovo Formation	Russia	A crinoid. Genus includes new species S. sinusoides. Published online in 2026, but the issue date is listed as November 2025.	
Sulphaster	Gen. et sp. nov	Valid	Smith et al.	Carboniferous (Serpukhovian)	Big Clifty Formation	United States (Indiana)	A brittle star. The type species is S. odellettorum.	
Synbathocrinus shackletoni	Sp. nov	Valid	Webster et al.	Permian (Kungurian)		Oman	A crinoid belonging to the group Disparida and the family Synbathocrinidae.	
Syzigobrachiocrinus	Gen. et sp. nov	Valid	Mirantsev	Carboniferous (Kasimovian)	Neverovo Formation	Russia	A crinoid. Genus includes new species S. ramulosus. Published online in 2026, but the issue date is listed as November 2025.	
Tenuibrachiocrinus	Gen. et 2 sp. nov	Valid	Mirantsev	Carboniferous (Kasimovian)	Neverovo Formation	Russia	A crinoid. Genus includes new species T. domodedovoensis and T. erlangeri. Published online in 2026, but the issue date is listed as November 2025.	
Triboporus	Gen. et sp. nov		Schlüter et al.	Late Cretaceous (Coniacian)		Algeria	A sea urchin belonging to the family Phymosomatidae. Genus includes new species T. luluatus.	
Tuscumbiacrinus	Gen. et sp. nov	Valid	Keyes, Wright & Ausich	Carboniferous (Viséan)	Tuscumbia Limestone	United States (Alabama)	A camerate crinoid belonging to the group Monobathrida and the family Paragaricocrinidae. The type species is T. madisonensis.	
Umerophiura daki	Sp. nov	Valid	Smith et al.	Carboniferous (Serpukhovian)	Big Clifty Formation	United States (Indiana)	A brittle star.	
Vandelooaster douglasi	Sp. nov	Valid	Smith et al.	Carboniferous (Serpukhovian)	Big Clifty Formation	United States (Indiana)	A brittle star.	
Vectisaster	Gen. et sp. nov	Valid	Gale	Late Cretaceous (Campanian)	Culver Chalk Formation	Sweden; United Kingdom	A starfish belonging to the family Podosphaerasteridae. The type species is V. enigmaticus.	
Voskresenskicrinus	Gen. et sp. nov	Valid	Mirantsev	Carboniferous (Kasimovian)	Neverovo Formation	Russia	A crinoid. Genus includes new species V. medvedkensis. Published online in 2026, but the issue date is listed as November 2025.	
Weisbordella inglisensis	Sp. nov	Valid	Osborn, Portell & Mooi	Eocene	Ocala Limestone	United States (Florida)	A sea urchin belonging to the family Neolaganidae.	
Weisbordella libum	Sp. nov	Valid	Osborn, Portell & Mooi	Eocene	Ocala Limestone	United States (Florida)	A sea urchin belonging to the family Neolaganidae.	

=== Echinoderm research ===
- Evidence from the study of outgrowths on disarticulated echinoderm fragments from the Cambrian (Wuliuan) rocks of the Burke River Structural Belt (Australia), interpreted as reaction to parasitic epibionts and the oldest evidence of parasitic symbiotic interactions on deuterostome hosts reported to date, is presented by Goñi et al. (2025).
- Guenser et al. (2025) report evidence of concentration of research on the fossil record of stylophorans in the higher-income countries, regardless of the origin of the studied fossil material, throughout the history of the study of this group, including evidence that the majority of studies on fossils from the Global South published between 1925 and 1999 did not include local collaborators, and evidence of transfer of fossil material from countries of the Global South to countries of the Global North.
- A new echinoderm Lagerstätte dominated by specimens of the solutan species Dendrocystites barrandei is described from the Ordovician (Sandbian) strata of the Letná Formation (Czech Republic) by Fatka et al. (2025).
- Evidence from the study of the echinoderm assemblage from the Ordovician Bromide Formation (Oklahoma, United States), indicating that paracrinoids and other pelmatozoans likely occupied different regions of niche space and did not compete for food, is presented by Higdon & Cole (2025).
- New fossil material of Wellerocystis and Implicaticystis, providing new information on the morphology of the studied paracrinoids, is described from the Ordovician Kimmswick Limestone (Missouri, United States) by Paul, Guensburg & Darrough (2025).
- New fossil material of cupressocrinine cupressocrinitid crinoids, providing new information on their morphology and ontogeny, is described from the Devonian strata of the Bergisch Gladbach-Paffrath Syncline and the Eifel Synclines (Germany) by Bohatý & Ausich (2025).
- A study on the microstructure of the stalk of Seirocrinus, indicative of presence of adaptations that reduced weight of the studied crinoid and enabled it to live attached to a raft system such as drifting wood without significantly contributing to its sinking, is presented by Gorzelak et al. (2025).
- An indeterminate solanocrinitid representing the first known opalized comatulid crinoid reported to date is described from the Cretaceous strata in South Australia by Salamon, Kapitany & Płachno (2025).
- Salamon et al. (2025) describe fossils of members of the genus Isselicrinus from the Transylvanian Basin (Romania), representing the first reported Eocene shallow-water occurrence of the studied stalked crinoids from the Northern Hemisphere.
- Evidence from the study of the fossil record of Paleozoic echinoids, indicating that inclusion of unpublished museum specimens can strongly affect the results of the studies of biogeography and evolution of groups known from fossils, is presented by Dean & Thompson (2025).
- A study on the preservation of fossils of Paleozoic echinoids and on factors influencing the quality of preservation of the studied specimens is published by Thompson et al. (2025).
- Yakouya-Moubamba et al. (2025) describe fossil material of Mecaster fourneli from the Turonian strata in Gabon, and report evidence of strong morphological similarity of the studied fossils to specimens from Algeria and Peru.
- Blake & Lefebvre (2025) revise the asterozoan class Somasteroidea, and name a new chinianasterid subfamily Ophioxenikosinae.

== Hemichordates ==
Name	Novelty	Status	Authors	Age	Type locality	Country	Notes	Images
Paradiversograptus lucianae	Sp. nov	Valid	Lopez et al.	Silurian (Llandovery)		Argentina	A graptolite.	
Pristiograptus eberi	Sp. nov	Valid	Lopez et al.	Silurian (Llandovery)		Argentina	A graptolite.	
Yunotubus	Gen. et sp. nov		Yang et al.	Cambrian Stage 3	Hongjingshao Formation	China	A graptolite. The type species is Y. gemmatus.	

=== Hemichordate research ===
- A study on the evolution of body symmetry in extant and fossil pterobranchs is published by Maletz (2025).
- Mitchell et al. (2025) report evidence of impact of changes of oceanographic and climatic conditions resulting from the Hirnantian glaciation on the diversity structure of graptolites, ultimately resulting in extinction of Diplograptina and adaptive radiation of Neograptina.
- Gao, Tan & Wang (2025) study hydrodynamic properties of a model of Calyxdendrum (a graptolite with a morphology intermediate between benthic dendroids and planktic graptoloids), and argue that planktic lifestyle might have evolved independently in multiple graptolite lineages.
- The conclusions of the study of Saulsbury et al. (2023), which found that the survivorship of the Ordovician and Silurian graptoloids is consistent with the neutral theory of biodiversity and that this theory can be used to formulate hypotheses on changes in ancient ecosystems, are contested by Johnson (2025) and reaffirmed by Saulsbury et al. (2025).
- Maletz & Gutiérrez-Marco (2025) revise the graptolite genus Ptilograptus and transfer it from the family Callograptidae to the family Dendrograptidae.
- Gao, Tan & Wang (2025) consider the double-helical rotating locomotion as most likely for Dicellograptus, and argue that evolution from Jiangxigraptus to Dicellograptus involved selection for improvement in hydrodynamic characteristics.
- Evidence indicating that the decline of graptolite diversity in the Prague Basin during the Lundgreni Event was related to increased oxygenation of offshore environments is presented by Frýda & Frýdová (2025).
- A study on the construction of the tubarium of retiolitine graptolites pre- and post-Lundgreni Event and on their evolutionary relationships is published by Maletz (2025).
- Reich & Krümmer (2025) describe rhabdopleurid stolon systems overgrowing other organisms from the Cretaceous Chalk Sea floor, discovered in the Maastrichtian strata from Rügen (Germany).

== Conodonts ==
Name	Novelty	Status	Authors	Age	Type locality	Country	Notes	Images
Acanthodistacodus	Gen. et comb. nov	Valid	Tolmacheva, Dronov & Lykov	Ordovician		Russia	The type species is "Scolopodus" consimilis Moskalenko, (1973); genus also includes A. compositus (Moskalenko, 1973). Published online in 2025, but the issue date is listed as December 2024.	
Aloxoconus acutus	Sp. nov	Valid	Zhen in Zhen et al.	Ordovician		Australia		
Amadeognathus	Gen. et comb. nov	Valid	Zhen in Zhen et al.	Ordovician		Australia	The type species is "Acodus" buetefueri Cooper (1981).	
Ancyrogondolella castillionensis	Sp. nov		Orchard, Friedman & Mihalynuk	Late Triassic (Norian)	Selish Formation	Canada (British Columbia)		
Ancyrogondolella ferrata	Sp. nov		Orchard, Friedman & Mihalynuk	Late Triassic (Norian)	Selish Formation	Canada (British Columbia)		
Boardmanites	Gen. et comb. nov	Valid	Barrick & Nestell	Carboniferous–Permian		United States	The type species is B. conflexa (Ellison, 1941).	
Borinella dibucoensis	Sp. nov		Li et al.	Early Triassic (Olenekian)		China		
Borinella? prima	Sp. nov		Leu & Goudemand in Leu et al.	Early Triassic (Olenekian)	Khunamuh Formation	Canada (British Columbia); India; Oman	A member of the family Gondolellidae.	
Coelocerodontus lindsayae	Sp. nov	Valid	Zhen in Zhen et al.	Ordovician		Australia		
Cooperignathus? pincallyensis	Sp. nov	Valid	Zhen in Zhen et al.	Ordovician	Tabita Formation	Australia		
Drepanoistodus barnesi	Sp. nov	Valid	Zhen in Zhen et al.	Ordovician		Australia		
Drepanoistodus decisus	Sp. nov	Valid	Zhen in Zhen et al.	Ordovician		Australia		
Icriodus aqua	Sp. nov	Valid	Soboleva & Nazarova	Devonian (Frasnian)	Ust'-Yarega Formation	Russia		
Icriodus lacrima	Sp. nov	Valid	Soboleva & Nazarova	Devonian (Frasnian)	Ust'-Yarega Formation	Russia		
Idiognathodus anteparallelus	Sp. nov	Valid	Hu, Qi & Wei	Carboniferous (Moscovian)		China		
Idiognathodus prosonimius	Sp. nov	Valid	Hu, Qi & Wei	Carboniferous (Moscovian)		China		
Idiognathodus zhuotingi	Sp. nov	Valid	Hu, Qi & Wei	Carboniferous (Moscovian)		China		
Lissoepikodus ethingtoni	Sp. nov	Valid	Zhen in Zhen et al.	Ordovician		Australia		
Neospathodus aristatus	Sp. nov		Leu & Goudemand in Leu et al.	Early Triassic	Khunamuh Formation	China; India; Japan		
Neospathodus diminutus	Sp. nov		Han et al.	Early Triassic		Pakistan		
Neospathodus guryulensis	Sp. nov		Leu & Goudemand in Leu et al.	Early Triassic	Khunamuh Formation	India		
Neospathodus prolixus	Sp. nov		Han et al.	Early Triassic		Pakistan		
Oistodus panderi	Sp. nov	Valid	Zhen in Zhen et al.	Ordovician		Australia		
Pachycladina shiquania	Sp. nov		Wu, Ji & Lash	Triassic		China		
Paltodus simplex	Sp. nov	Valid	Zhen et al.	Cambrian–Ordovician transition		Australia		
Pelekysgnathus crispus	Sp. nov	Valid	Corriga, Ferretti & Corradini	Silurian		Italy	A member of Prioniodontida belonging to the family Icriodontidae.	
Pelekysgnathus pazukhini	Sp. nov		Plotitsyn et al.	Devonian (Famennian)		Russia		
Plectodina maloneyensis	Sp. nov	Valid	Zhen in Zhen et al.	Ordovician		Australia		
Polygnathus ovaliformis	Sp. nov	Valid	Izokh	Devonian		Russia		
Resinodus	Gen. et sp. nov		Mango & Albanesi	Ordovician (Dapingian)	San Juan Formation	Argentina	Genus includes new species R. nalamamacatus.	
Scalpellodus crespinae	Sp. nov	Valid	Zhen in Zhen et al.	Ordovician		Australia	Subsequently transferred to the genus Kirkupodus.	
Trapezognathus morenensis	Sp. nov		Rueda, Albanesi & Ortega	Ordovician (Floian)	Acoite Formation	Argentina		
Triangulodus obesus	Sp. nov	Valid	Zhen in Zhen et al.	Ordovician		Australia		
Tripodus precolaevis	Sp. nov		Mango & Albanesi	Ordovician (Dapingian)	San Juan Formation	Argentina		
Variabiloconus australis	Sp. nov	Valid	Zhen in Zhen et al.	Ordovician		Australia		
Variabiloconus delicatus	Sp. nov	Valid	Zhen et al.	Cambrian–Ordovician transition		Australia		
Wurmiella arcuata	Sp. nov	Valid	Corriga, Ferretti & Corradini	Silurian		Italy	A member of Ozarkodinida belonging to the family Spathognathodontidae.	
Wurmiella lucae	Sp. nov	Valid	Corriga, Ferretti & Corradini	Silurian		Italy	A member of Ozarkodinida belonging to the family Spathognathodontidae.	
Wurmiella pulchra	Sp. nov	Valid	Corriga, Ferretti & Corradini	Silurian		Italy	A member of Ozarkodinida belonging to the family Spathognathodontidae.	
Wurmiella silurica	Sp. nov	Valid	Corriga, Ferretti & Corradini	Silurian		Italy	A member of Ozarkodinida belonging to the family Spathognathodontidae.	

=== Conodont research ===
- Paiste et al. (2025) revise the conodont biostratigraphy in the Ordovician (Sandbian–lower Katian) strata in Lithuania, Ukraine, Estonia and Sweden.
- Taxonomic revision of Acodus longibasis and A. triangularis is published by Zhen (2025), who also revises the generic diagnosis of Acodus and supports the interpretation of this genus as valid.
- A study on the fossil record of Eifelian to Frasnian conodonts from the Spanish Pyrenees, providing evidence of regional variations in the impact of major Givetian Global Events on conodont diversity dynamics, is published by Liao & Valenzuela-Ríos (2025).
- A study on the morphological variation of oral elements of members of the genus Polygnathus from the Devonian/Carboniferous transition is published by Nesme et al. (2025), who find evidence of reduced morphological variation in larger elements than in smaller ones, interpreted as indicative of increase in functional constraints on large-sized Polygnathus elements.
- A study on P_{1} elements of members of the genus Polygnathus from Montagne Noire (France) living in the aftermath of the Hangenberg event, providing evidence consistent with changes of change of diet of the studied conodonts during their ontogeny as well as evidence indicating that small specimens were more susceptible to environmental influences than large ones, is published by Nesme et al. (2025).
- A study on the phylogenetic relationships, biogeography and biostratigraphy of members of the genus Gnathodus is published by Wang, Hu & Wang (2025).
- A study on factors influencing the spatial distribution of conodonts in the aftermath of the Permian–Triassic extinction event is published by Guenser et al. (2025).
- Wu et al. (2025) study the morphological variation of oral elements of members of the genus Chiosella, and argue that the majority of specimens of Chiosella gondolelloides could be juvenile forms of Chiosella timorensis.

== Amphibians ==
Name	Novelty	Status	Authors	Age	Type locality	Country	Notes	Images
Ariekanerpeton kuedensis	Sp. nov	Valid	Bulanov	Permian (Kungurian-Roadian)		Russia (Perm Krai)	A discosauriscid seymouriamorph. A species of Ariekanerpeton.	
Buxierophus	Gen. et sp. nov	Valid	Werneburg, Logghe & Steyer	Permian		France	A dissorophid temnospondyl. The type species is B. pouilloni.	
Duffaudiella	Gen. et sp. nov		Macaluso et al.	Eocene		France	A salamander belonging to the family Salamandridae. The type species is D. paleogenica.	
Dynamognathus	Gen. et sp. nov	Valid	Gunnin et al.	Pliocene	Gray Fossil Site	United States (Tennessee)	A salamander belonging to the family Plethodontidae. The type species is D. robertsoni.	
Eotriton	Gen. et comb. nov		Macaluso et al.	Eocene		Germany	A salamander belonging to the family Salamandridae. The type species is E. weigelti (Herre, 1935).	
Huangfuchuansuchus	Gen. et sp. nov		Chen & Liu	Early Triassic	Heshanggou Formation	China	A temnospondyl belonging to the clade Capitosauria. The type species is H. haojiamaoensis.	
Latonia dimenticata	Sp. nov	Valid	Sorbelli et al.	Pleistocene		Italy	A species of Latonia.	
Litoria tylerantiqua	Sp. nov		Farman, Archer & Hand	Eocene		Australia	A species of Litoria.	
Martintriton	Gen. et sp. nov	Valid	Skutschas et al.	Early Cretaceous (Barremian–Aptian)		Germany	A salamandroid salamander. Genus includes new species M. septatus.	
Morovius	Gen. et sp. nov	Valid	Novikov & Shishkin	Early Triassic (Induan)		Russia	A lonchorhynchid temnospondyl. Genus includes new species M. juliaromanorum.	
Philoria godthelpi	Sp. nov	Valid	Farman, Archer & Hand	Miocene	Riversleigh World Heritage Area	Australia	A species of Philoria.	
Rhineceps karibaensis	Sp. nov	Valid	Steyer & Sidor	Permian (Lopingian)	Madumabisa Mudstone Formation	Zambia	A rhinesuchid temnospondyl. A species of Rhineceps.	
Sclerocephalus megalorhinus	Sp. nov	Valid	Schoch	Permian (Asselian)	Meisenheim Formation	Germany		
Sclerocephalus odernheimensis	Sp. nov	Valid	Schoch	Permian (Asselian)	Meisenheim Formation	Germany		
Venczelibatrachus	Gen. et sp. nov	Valid	Vasilyan & Macaluso	Paleocene		Germany	A frog belonging to the family Alytidae. The type species is V. palaeocenicus.	
Xerocephalella	Gen. et comb. nov	Valid	Muzzopappa, Bargo & Vizcaíno	Paleocene and Eocene	Salamanca Formation	Argentina	A new genus for "Calyptocephalella" sabrosa Muzzopappa et al. (2020); genus also includes "Calyptocephalella" pichileufensis Gómez, Báez & Muzzopappa (2011).	

=== Amphibian research ===
- New information on the anatomy of the braincases of Ventastega curonica and Acanthostega gunnari is published by Ahlberg et al. (2025).
- A study on the body plan of Ichthyostega is published by Strong et al. (2025), who provide evidence of the presence of a mixture of fish- and tetrapod-like body proportions, and interpret forelimbs of Ichthyostega as bearing a higher fraction of body weight than its hindlimbs when the animal moved on land.
- Marshall et al. (2025) use palynological assemblages from the Carboniferous Ballagan Formation (Scotland, United Kingdom) to place early tetrapods from different localities from this formation within a Tournaisian timeframe.
- Redescription and a study on the affinities of Carboniferous baphetids from the Czech Republic is published by Barták, Ivanov & Ekrt (2025), who identify rediscovered part of the type material of Loxomma bohemicum as remains of temnospondyl species Capetus palustris.
- The maximum depositional age of the Carboniferous fossils from the East Kirkton Quarry (Scotland, United Kingdom), including fossils of Balanerpeton woodi, Eucritta melanolimnetes, Kirktonecta milnerae, Ophiderpeton kirktonense, Silvanerpeton miripedes and Westlothiana lizziae, is reinterpreted as more likely to be middle-lower Viséan rather than upper Viséan by Garza et al. (2025).
- Redescription of the anatomy of Calligenethlon watsoni is published by Adams et al. (2025).
- Ruta et al. (2025) study the evolution of skull length in temnospondyls.
- A study on the body size, morphological diversity, biogeography and feeding ecology of temnospondyls throughout the Triassic is published by Mehmood et al. (2025).
- Werneburg (2025) redescribes the morphology of Glanochthon lellbachae on the basis of data from previously unpublished specimens from the Permian Meisenheim Formation (Saar–Nahe Basin; Germany).
- Feng et al. (2025) describe a probable stereospondyl tooth from the strata of the Longtan Formation in Chongqing, representing the first record of a Permian tetrapod from southern China reported to date and supporting the existence of a land connection between northern and southern China during the Permian.
- Revision of the skeletal morphology of Plagiosternum granulosum and a study on its ontogeny and probable ecology is published by Schoch et al. (2025).
- A study on the parasphenoids of Early Triassic trematosauroids and capitosaurs from the European part of Russia, providing evidence of differences of the levator scapulae muscles of the studied temnospondyls that were likely related to differences of their lifestyles, is published by Morkovin (2025).
- A study on the morphological variation, phylogenetic relationships and evolutionary history of members of the genus Cyclotosaurus is published by Schoch et al. (2025).
- Kufner et al. (2025) report the discovery of a probable mass mortality assemblage of Buettnererpeton bakeri from the Upper Triassic strata from the Nobby Knob site (Popo Agie Formation; Wyoming, United States).
- A study on the structure of tissue of the dermal pectoral bones of Metoposaurus krasiejowensis is published by Kalita, Teschner & Konietzko-Meier (2025).
- A study on the histology of the ilium and the ischium of Metoposaurus krasiejowensis, providing possible evidence of a reduced role of the pelvic girdle and hindlimbs in locomotion of members of the studied species, is published by Konietzko-Meier, Prino & Teschner (2025).
- A study on pathologies in cervical vertebrae of specimens of Metoposaurus krasiejowensis is published by Antczak et al. (2025), who identify the oldest block joint between the atlas and the axis reported in a tetrapod, as well as the first record of spinal arthropathy in a non-amniote.
- New information on the morphology of the lower jaw of Trimerorhachis is provided by Ruta, Bolt & Barber (2025).
- Gee, Mann & Sues (2025) describe a new specimen of Aspidosaurus chiton from the Permian (Cisuralian) strata in Texas, and designate it as the neotype of the species.
- Skutschas, Kolchanov & Syromyatnikova (2025) report evidence of presence of pedicellate teeth in karaurids, interpreted as confirming the neotenic nature of the studied specimens.
- Noda et al. (2025) identify giant salamander remains from the Shikimizu bed (Ehime Prefecture, Shikoku, Japan) as belonging to the Japanese giant salamander, providing evidence of broader geographical range of the species in the past.
- A study on the fossil record of Quaternary mole salamanders from Hall's Cave (Texas, United States) is published by Ledesma, Moxley & Kemp (2025), who link the disappearance of mole salamanders from the Edwards Plateau to landscape changes and shift to hotter and drier climate in the middle Holocene.
- Evidence from the study of melanosomes of extant and fossil anurans, indicative of conserved geometries (likely related to conserved function) of melanosomes in the eyes and internal tissues of the studied specimens, as well as of diffences in the geometry of skin melanosomes of extant and fossil anurans, is presented by Falk et al. (2025).
- Redescription of the anatomy of Vieraella herbstii is published by Báez & Nicoli (2025).
- Fossil material representing the northernmost record of frogs from the Upper Cretaceous Bauru Group is described from the Adamantina and Serra da Galga formations (Brazil) by Muniz et al. (2025), who report the discovery of a possible calyptocephalellid representing the first member of the group reported from the northern part of South America.
- New fossil material of Bakonybatrachus fedori is described from the Santonian strata from the Iharkút vertebrate locality (Hungary) by Szentesi (2025).
- Lemierre et al. (2025) describe new fossil material of members of Pipimorpha from the Upper Cretaceous (Coniacian-Santonian) strata from the Becetèn site (Niger), providing evidence of presence of at least four pipimorph taxa at the studied site.
- Lin et al. (2025) describe a vertebra of Duttaphrynus melanostictus representing the first record of an amphibian fossil from Taiwan, probably originating from the Middle Pleistocene Chiting Formation.
- Bravo et al. (2025) report the discovery of fossil material of a member of the genus Ceratophrys from the Miocene Palo Pintado Formation, representing one of the westernmost records of the genus in northern Argentina reported to date, and claimed by the authors to be the first record of this genus from the studied formation; however, Zimicz et al. (2025) cite previous records of Ceratophrys from the Palo Pintado Formation, and argue that the fossil material described by Bravo et al. is more likely Pliocene in age.
- Lemierre et al. (2025) describe new fossil material of frogs from the Miocene strata from the Chamtwara locality (Kenya), including the first fossil occurrence of a member of the family Arthroleptidae.
- Nicoli et al. (2025) reinterpret Neoprocoela edentata as a species belonging to the extant genus Nannophryne.
- An external mould of a true toad, preserving details of its soft anatomy, is described from the Miocene strata from the Böttingen Fossillagerstätte (Germany) by Maisch & Stöhr (2025).
- Lemierre & Orliac (2025) describe fossil material of Paleogene amphibians from the locality of Dams (Quercy Phosphorites Formation, France), reporting evidence of a faunal turnover at the Eocene-Oligocene transition.
- Logghe et al. (2025) report evidence of preservation of soft tissues including skin and intestinal casts in new specimens of Discosauriscus from the Permian Lagerstätte of Franchesse (France), providing evidence of reptile-like epidermal scalation in juvenile discosauriscids seymouriamorphs.
- Reisz & Modesto (2025) revise Asaphestera platyris, and interpret it as nomen dubium and as a recumbirostran "microsaur" rather than a synapsid.
- Byrnes, Bolt & Mann (2025) report the first discovery of fossil material of Ctenerpeton remex from the Mazon Creek fossil beds (Illinois, United States), expanding known diversity of nectrideans from the studied assemblage.
- Jenkins et al. (2025) redescribe the skull of Hapsidopareion lepton, consider Llistrofus pricei to represent a junior synonym of this species, and reevaluate the affinities of recumbirostrans, recovering them as a clade of stem-amniotes.

== Synapsids ==
=== Non-mammalian synapsids ===
Name	Novelty	Status	Authors	Age	Type locality	Country	Notes	Images
Arboroharamiya fuscus	Sp. nov	Valid	Li et al.	Jurassic	Tiaojishan Formation	China		
Arctops umulunshi	Sp. nov	Valid	Mann & Sidor	Permian (Lopingian)	Madumabisa Mudstone Formation	Zambia	A gorgonopsian. A species of Arctops.	
Aulacephalodon kapoliwacela	Sp. nov	Valid	Thomas, Angielczyk & Peecook	Permian (Lopingian)	Madumabisa Mudstone Formation	Zambia	A geikiid dicynodont. A species of Aulacephalodon.	
Bienotheroides wucaiensis	Sp. nov		Liu et al.	Late Jurassic	Shishugou Formation	China	A tritylodontid cynodont.	
Camurocondylus	Gen. et sp. nov	Valid	Mao et al.	Early Jurassic (Hettangian-Pliensbachian)	Lufeng Formation	China	A member of Morganucodonta. The type species is C. lufengensis.	
Cradognathus	Gen. et comb. nov	Valid	Lloyd & Durand	Permian (Changhsingian)	Balfour Formation	South Africa	A therocephalian belonging to the family Akidnognathidae. The type species is "Hewittia" albanensis Brink (1959).	
Dicynodontoides kubwa	Sp. nov	Valid	Shipps, Sidor & Angielczyk	Permian (Lopingian)	Usili Formation	Tanzania	A kingoriid dicynodont. A species of Dicynodontoides.	
Dinanomodon guoi	Sp. nov	Valid	Shi & Liu	Late Permian	Probably Sunan Formation	China	A dicynodont.	
Euptychognathus kingae	Sp. nov	Valid	Kammerer, Angielczyk & Fröbisch	Permian (Lopingian)	Madumabisa Mudstone Formation	Zambia	A lystrosaurid dicynodont. A species of Euptychognathus.	
Lystrosauravus	Gen. et sp. nov	Valid	Kammerer, Angielczyk & Fröbisch	Permian (Lopingian)	Cistecephalus Assemblage Zone (Beaufort Group)	South Africa	A lystrosaurid dicynodont. The type species is L. bothae.	
Madumabisa	Gen. et sp. nov	Valid	Kammerer, Angielczyk & Fröbisch	Permian (Lopingian)	Madumabisa Mudstone Formation	Zambia	A lystrosaurid dicynodont. The type species is M. opainion.	
Mdomowabata	Gen. et sp. nov	Valid	Angielczyk & Otoo	Permian (Lopingian)	Usili Formation	Tanzania	A cryptodontian dicynodont. The type species M. trilobops.	
Nujalikodon	Gen. et sp. nov		Patrocínio et al.	Early Jurassic (Hettangian)	Rhætelv Formation	Greenland	A member or a close relative of Docodonta. The type species is N. cassiopeiae.	
Pontognathus	Gen. et sp. nov	Valid	Gaetano et al.	Late Triassic (Carnian)	Chañares Formation	Argentina	A cynodont belonging to the family Traversodontidae. The type species is P. ignotus.	

==== Synapsid research ====
- Review of studies on the morphology and evolution of brains of synapsids, their sense organs, endothermy and behavior from the preceding years is published by Bolton, Mangera & Benoit (2025).
- Evidence from a comparative study of skull anatomy of non-mammalian synapsids and extant chameleons, interpreted as consistent with the presence a mandibular middle ear in early synapsids, is presented by Olroyd & Kopperud (2025).
- A study on changes in humerus and femur of synapsids throughout their evolutionary history is published by Bishop & Pierce (2025).
- A study on changes of shape of the humerus and changes of posture of synapsids throughout their evolutionary history is published by Brocklehurst et al. (2025), who interpret ancestral synapsids as sprawling but morphologically distinct from extant sprawling animals, and interpret the evolution of posture of modern therian mammals as resulting from successive synapsid radiations with varied postures rather than from a direct progression from sprawling to therian-like posture.
- A study on the diversity of varanopids throughout their evolutionary history is published by Laurin & Didier (2025), who find no evidence for an end-Kungurian extinction event, and interpret the extinction of varanopids as likely related to the Capitanian mass extinction event.
- New information on the anatomy of the appendicular skeleton of Mesenosaurus efremovi is provided by Rowe et al. (2025).
- Marchetti et al. (2025) describe sphenacodontid body impressions (probably produced by a group of four individuals) from the Permian (Sakmarian) Tambach Formation (Germany), providing evidence of presence of epidermal scales in sphenacodontids, and name a new ichnotaxon Bromackerichnus requiescens.
- A study on the anatomy of skull and teeth of Moschognathus whaitsi is published by Lafferty et al. (2025), who report evidence of multiple replacements of incisiform teeth and their alternating replacement pattern, resulting in similarities of tooth replacement in the studied taxon and in the dental batteries in sauropod dinosaurs.
- Nieke, Fröbisch & Canoville (2025) study the histology of limb bones of Suminia getmanovi, interpreted as consistent with an arboreal lifestyle.
- A study on the impact of use of continuous traits on results of analyses of phylogenetic relationships of dicynodonts is published by Wynd et al. (2025).
- Benoit & Jodder (2025) describe new fossil material of Kombuisia frerensis from the Anisian Burgersdorp Formation (South Africa), confirming the absence of the parietal foramen in members of this species.
- Description of the anatomy of the postcranial skeleton of Kembawacela kitchingi is published by Abbott et al. (2025).
- A study on the skeletal anatomy and phylogenetic affinities of Rastodon procurvidens is published by Silva et al. (2025), who recover the studied dicynodont as the first known South American member of the family Kingoriidae.
- De Souza et al. (2025) identify the dicynodont skull from the Triassic strata of the Dinodontosaurus Assemblage Zone of the Santa Maria Supersequence described by Araújo (1981) as a skull of Dinodontosaurus brevirostris, providing evidence of presence of this species in Brazil.
- Matamales-Andreu et al. (2025) describe probable gorgonopsian footprints from the Permian strata of the Port des Canonge Formation (Spain), and name a new ichnotaxon Algarpes ferus.
- A study on the bone histology of an indeterminate gorgonopsian specimen from the Permian strata of the upper Madumabisa Mudstone Formation (Zambia), providing evidence of slower growth than in gorgonopsians from the Karoo Basin, is published by Kulik (2025).
- Macungo, Benoit & Araújo (2025) describe fossil material of Inostrancevia africana from the Permian strata of the K6a2 Member of the Metangula graben (Mozambique), supporting its correlation with the Daptocephalus Assemblage Zone in South Africa.
- Cookson and Mann (2025) re-examine two historic skulls of Lycaenops assigned to L. angusticeps and L. cf. L. angusticeps and reassess their taxonomy.
- Liu & Abdala (2025) describe new specimens of Jiucaiyuangnathus confusus from the Lower Triassic Jiucaiyuan Formation (China), interpret known specimens as early juveniles, as revise the diagnostic features of the studied taxon.
- Evidence indicating that Thrinaxodon liorhinus was capable of and reliant on tympanic hearing similar to hearing of extant mammals is presented by Wilken et al. (2025).
- Filippini, Abdala & Cassini (2025) provide new estimates of body mass for Andescynodon, Pascualgnathus, Massetognathus, Cynognathus and Exaeretodon.
- Kerber et al. (2025) describe traversodontid postcranial material from the Pinheiros-Chiniquá Sequence at the Linha Várzea 1 site (Brazil), representing a morphotype distinct from other traversodontid postcranial remains from this locality.
- A study on the bone histology of Luangwa drysdalli and Scalenodon angustifrons, providing evidence of different life histories of the studied cynodonts, is published by Kulik (2025).
- A study on the anatomy of the postcranial skeleton of Luangwa sudamericana is published by Souza et al. (2025).
- Medina et al. (2025) provide new information on the anatomy of the cranial endocast of Massetognathus pascuali, and describe the maxillary canal of the studied cynodont.
- A study on changes in the skull anatomy of Siriusgnathus niemeyerorum during its ontogeny is published by Roese-Miron & Kerber (2025).
- A study on the skull anatomy of Siriusgnathus niemeyerorum, including the first reconstruction of its cranial nerves and the first description of its inner ear, is published by Roese-Miron et al. (2025).
- New specimen of Exaeretodon riograndensis, providing new information on the postcranial anatomy of members of this species, is described by Kerber et al. (2025).
- A specimen of Exaeretodon riograndensis affected by traumatic fracture of ribs that limited its locomotion capabilities, and possibly surviving with help of other members of its group, is described from the Upper Triassic strata of the Santa Maria Supersequence (Brazil) by Doneda, Roese–Miron & Kerber (2025).
- New information on the skull anatomy of Trucidocynodon riograndensis is provided by Kerber et al. (2025).
- Dotto et al. (2025) describe fossil material of a prozostrodontian cynodont from the Upper Triassic strata from the Buriol site (Hyperodapedon Assemblage Zone, Brazil), providing new information on the morphological diversity of teeth of Carnian probainognathians.
- New information on the anatomy of Yuanotherium minor is provided by Liu, Ren & Mao (2025).
- Description of the endocranial anatomy of Bienotheroides is published by Ren et al. (2025).
- Description of new fossil material of Bienotheroides zigongensis from the Upper Jurassic Shishugou Formation (China) and a study on the phylogenetic relationships of tritylodontids is published by Ren et al. (2025).
- Averianov et al. (2025) report evidence of a dentary–squamosal jaw articulation in Xenocretosuchus sibiricus, providing evidence of development of such jaw articulation in a tritylodontid independently from those observed in tritheledontids and mammaliaforms.
- Wang et al. (2025) describe a new mandible of Fossiomanus sinensis from the Lower Cretaceous Jiufotang Formation (China), providing new information on the mandible shape and tooth morphology of members of this species.
- A study on bite force capabilities and on mandible resistance to stress, bending and torsion in Brasilodon quadrangularis is published by Salcido et al. (2025).
- Hai et al. (2025) describe a mandible of a juvenile specimen of Sinoconodon rigneyi from the Lower Jurassic Lufeng Formation (China), providing new information on tooth replacement in members of this species.
- Tumelty & Lautenschlager (2025) study the skull anatomy of Hadrocodium wui, and interpret the studied mammaliaform as not fully fossorial.

== Other animals ==
Name	Novelty	Status	Authors	Age	Type locality	Country	Notes	Images
Amblysiphonella ingens	Sp. nov	Valid	Malysheva	Permian		Russia (Primorsky Krai)	A sponge.	
Aninoides	Gen. et sp. nov		Rosse‐Guillevic et al.	Ediacaran	Fermeuse Formation	Canada (Newfoundland and Labrador)	A rangeomorph petalonamid. The type species is A. coombsorum.	
Archaeaphorme	Gen. et sp. nov		Botting et al.	Ordovician (Hirnantian)	Anji Biota	China	A hexactinellid sponge. The type species is A. conica.	
Aulacera arbuscula	Sp. nov		Jeon in Jeon et al.	Ordovician (Katian)	Koumenzi Formation	China	A member of Stromatoporoidea.	
Bakiribu	Gen. et sp. nov	Disputed	Pêgas et al.	Early Cretaceous (Aptian-Albian)	Romualdo Formation	Brazil	A vertebrate of uncertain affinities. Originally described as a pterosaur belonging to the family Ctenochasmatidae; subsequently considered to be an indeterminate ray-finned fish (possibly an amiid) by Unwin et al. (2026), who considered it to be a nomen dubium. The type species is B. waridza.	
Blastulospongia bouliaensis	Sp. nov	Valid	Sheng & Aitchison	Cambrian (Drumian–Guzhangian)	Devoncourt Limestone	Australia	A demosponge belonging to the group Agelasida and the family Sebargasiidae.	
Bruckneria	Nom. nov	Valid	Hsu & Hsiao	Late Cretaceous (Coniacian)		Denmark	A hexactinellid sponge belonging to the family Euplectellidae; a replacement name for Walteriella Brückner (2006).	
Calathites macrocalyx	Sp. nov	Valid	Parry et al.	Cambrian (Drumian)	Marjum Formation	United States (Utah)	A member of the family Dinomischidae, possibly belonging to the total group of Ctenophora.	
Cassitella malinkyi	Sp. nov	Valid	Peel	Cambrian Series 2	Bastion Formation	Greenland	A member of Hyolitha.	
Charnia brasieri	Sp. nov		McIlroy et al.	Ediacaran		Canada (Newfoundland and Labrador)		
Charnia ewinoni	Sp. nov	Valid	Pasinetti et al.	Ediacaran		Canada (Newfoundland and Labrador)		
Chiastoclonella globula	Sp. nov	Valid	Rhebergen & Van Keulen	Ordovician		Germany	A demosponge belonging to the group Orchocladina and the family Chiastoclonellidae.	
Chiastoclonella incrustans	Sp. nov	Valid	Rhebergen & Van Keulen	Ordovician		Germany; Netherlands	A demosponge belonging to the group Orchocladina and the family Chiastoclonellidae.	
Chiastodiscus	Gen. et 2 sp. nov	Valid	Rhebergen & Van Keulen	Ordovician		Estonia; Germany; Netherlands; Russia; Sweden	A demosponge belonging to the group Orchocladina and the family Chiastoclonellidae. The type species is C. verrucosus; genus also includes C. regularis.	
Chimeraspongia	Gen. et sp. nov		Zou et al.	Cambrian Stage 4	Wulongqing Formation	China	A sponge belonging to the group Ascospongiae. The type species is C. lii.	
Choia qingjiangensis	Sp. nov	Valid	Wu et al.	Cambrian Stage 3		China	A demosponge.	
Choia textura	Sp. nov	Valid	Wu et al.	Cambrian Stage 3		China	A demosponge.	
Crateromorpha? (Neopsacas?) macrospicula	Sp. nov		Botting et al.	Ordovician (Hirnantian)	Anji Biota	China	A hexactinellid sponge.	
Crestjahitus groenlandicus	Sp. nov	Valid	Peel	Cambrian (Wuliuan)	Henson Gletscher Formation	Greenland	A member of Hyolithida.	
Cryptosiphon oboloides	Sp. nov	Valid	Vinn in Vinn et al.	Cambrian (Furongian)	Tsitre Formation	Estonia	A possible polychaete.	
Cryptothelion sujkowskii	Sp. nov	Valid	Świerczewska-Gładysz & Jurkowska	Late Cretaceous (Campanian)		Poland	A demosponge.	
Cystostroma inconstans	Sp. nov		Jeon in Jeon et al.	Ordovician (Katian)	Koumenzi Formation	China	A member of Stromatoporoidea.	
Dinomischus nudus	Sp. nov	Valid	Parry et al.	Cambrian (Drumian)	Marjum Formation	United States (Utah)	A member of the family Dinomischidae.	
Elegantilites custos	Sp. nov		Valent, Fatka & Budil	Ordovician	Dobrotivá Formation	Czech Republic	A member of Hyolitha.	
Eorosselloides	Gen. et sp. nov		Botting et al.	Ordovician (Hirnantian)	Anji Biota	China	A hexactinellid sponge. The type species is E. antiquus.	
Fimbulispina	Gen. et sp. nov	Valid	Peel	Cambrian (Drumian)	Fimbuldal Formation	China; Greenland	A relative of gnathiferans, particularly resembling Dakorhachis. The type species is F. laurentica.	
Juracanthocephalus	Gen. et sp. nov	Valid	Luo et al.	Middle Jurassic	Jiulongshan Formation	China	A member of Acanthocephala. The type species is J. daohugouensis.	
Kraytdraco	Gen. et sp. nov		Mussini et al.	Cambrian	Bright Angel Shale	United States (Arizona)	A member of Priapulida. The type species is K. spectatus.	
Longgangia	Gen. et sp. nov		Wang et al.	Cambrian (Wuliuan)	Mantou Formation	China	A probable annelid. The type species is L. bilamellata.	
Lophiostroma leizunia	Sp. nov		Jeon et al.	Ordovician		China	A member of Stromatoporoidea.	
Lophiostroma leptolamellatum	Sp. nov		Jeon in Jeon et al.	Ordovician (Katian)	Koumenzi Formation	China	A member of Stromatoporoidea.	
Lotispongia	Gen. et sp. nov		Luo in Luo et al.	Cambrian Stage 4	Wulongqing Formation	China	A sponge belonging to the family Leptomitidae. The type species is L. helicolumna.	
Macromyzon	Gen. et sp. nov	Valid	De Carle et al.	Silurian (Telychian)	Brandon Bridge Formation	United States (Wisconsin)	A leech. The type species is M. siluricus.	
Nektognathus	Gen. et sp. nov	Valid	Vinther et al.	Cambrian	Sirius Passet Lagerstätte	Greenland	A member of the family Nectocarididae. The type species is N. evasmithae.	
Niquivilispongia	Gen. et sp. nov	Valid	Carrera, Botting & Cañas	Ordovician (Dapingian)	San Juan Formation	Argentina	A sponge belonging to the group Heteractinida, possibly a member of the family Astraeospongiidae. The type species is N. asteria.	
Olgunia	Gen. et sp. nov	Valid	Luzhnaya	Ediacaran		Russia	An animal with colonial organization, possibly a sponge or a coelenterate-grade animal. Genus includes new species O. bondarenkoae.	
Paraleptomitella reticula	Sp. nov	Valid	Zhang et al.	Cambrian Series 2	Niutitang Formation	China	A sponge (possibly a hexactinellid) belonging to the family Leptomitidae.	
Paraleptomitella zunyiensis	Sp. nov	Valid	Zhang et al.	Cambrian Series 2	Niutitang Formation	China	A sponge (possibly a hexactinellid) belonging to the family Leptomitidae.	
Pentaditrupa nickcavei	Sp. nov	Valid	Kočí et al.	Paleocene (Selandian)	Kerteminde Marl Formation	Denmark	A polychaete belonging to the family Serpulidae.	
Plexodictyon qilianense	Sp. nov		Jeon in Jeon et al.	Ordovician (Katian)	Koumenzi Formation	China	A member of Stromatoporoidea.	
Primocyathus	Gen. et sp. nov		Wang & Xiaoin Wang et al.	Cambrian (Fortunian)	Kuanchuanpu Formation	China	A member of Archaeocyatha belonging to the group Ajacicyathida. The type species is P. uniseriatus.	
Propomatoceros lathahypossiae	Sp. nov	Valid	Beschin et al.	Eocene		Italy	A serpulid annelid.	
Protooncosclera	Gen. et sp. nov	Valid	Manconi et al.	Oligocene–Miocene	Foulden Maar Lagerstätte	New Zealand	A sponge belonging to the family Potamolepidae. Genus includes new species P. zealandiae.	
Pseudanoxycalyx	Gen. et sp. nov		Botting et al.	Ordovician (Hirnantian)	Anji Biota	China	A hexactinellid sponge. The type species is P. verrucosus.	
Radiostroma astroqilianus	Sp. nov		Jeon & Zhan in Jeon et al.	Ordovician (Katian)	Koumenzi Formation	China	A member of Stromatoporoidea.	
Rosenella hosholmia	Sp. nov	Valid	Jeon & Toom	Ordovician (Katian)	Adila Formation	Estonia	A member of Stromatoporoidea.	
Scalidodendron	Gen. et sp. nov		Mussini & Butterfield	Cambrian	Hess River Formation	Canada; Northwest Territories	A scalidophoran. The type species is S. crypticum.	
Simplexodictyon uniplexum	Sp. nov		Jeon in Jeon et al.	Ordovician (Katian)	Koumenzi Formation	China	A member of Stromatoporoidea.	
Sinabeatricea crassicentra	Sp. nov		Jeon in Jeon et al.	Ordovician (Katian)	Koumenzi Formation	China	A member of Stromatoporoidea.	
Sinocyathus	Gen. et sp. nov		Wang & Xiaoin Wang et al.	Cambrian (Fortunian)	Kuanchuanpu Formation	China	A member of Archaeocyatha belonging to the group Ajacicyathida. The type species is S. biseriatus.	
Spiraserpula iverseni	Sp. nov	Valid	Kočí & Goedert	Oligocene	Pysht Formation	United States (Washington)	A serpulid annelid.	
Stylostroma absurdum	Sp. nov	Valid	Antropova & Silantiev	Devonian (Famennian)		Russia	A member of Stromatoporoidea.	
Tentalus	Gen. et sp. nov	Valid	Kimmig et al.	Cambrian (Wuliuan)	Langston Formation	United States (Utah)	An animal of problematic affiliation. The type species is T. spencensis.	
Theiokylixia	Gen. et sp. nov	Valid	Parry et al.	Cambrian (Drumian)	Marjum Formation	United States (Utah)	A member of the family Dinomischidae. The type species is T. cartwrightae.	
Tulaneia	Gen. et sp. nov	Valid	Runnegar & Horodyski in Runnegar et al.	Probably latest Ediacaran	Wood Canyon Formation	United States (Nevada)	An erniettomorph. The type species is T. amabilia.	
Usaspongia	Gen. et sp. et comb. nov	Valid	Kolesnikov et al.	Permian (Asselian and Sakmarian)	Sezym Formation	Russia (Komi Republic)	A demosponge belonging to the family Anthaspidellidae. The type species is U. tchernyshevi; genus also includes "Stuckenbergia" artiensis Tchernychev (1898).	
Wilsumispongia	Gen. et 3 sp. nov	Valid	Rhebergen & Van Keulen	Ordovician		Germany; Netherlands	A demosponge belonging to the group Orchocladina and the family Chiastoclonellidae. The type species is W. cylindrica; genus also includes W. cratera and W. conica.	
Yanchangparapandorina	Gen. et sp. nov		Gan & Liu in Gan et al.	Triassic	Yanchang Formation	China	A probable animal embryo, possibly an embryo of an aquatic arthropod at the cleavage stage. The type species is Y. inornata.	

=== Other animal research ===
- Mitchell & Dhungana (2025) calculate the lifespans and relative evolutionary rates for Dickinsonia, Kimberella, Trepassia, Tribrachidium, Charnia, Ernietta, Avalofractus, Primocandelabrum, Charniodiscus and Fractofusus.
- Evidence from the study of extant invertebrates, indicating that coprostane is not a gut biomarker for Ediacaran animals, is presented by Mulligan & Gold (2025), who propose that the coprostane signal in the fossils of Dickinsonia is a result of feeding on the microbial mats by the studied animal.
- Possible dickinsoniomorph fossils, which if confirmed would provide evidence of survival the group into the latest Ediacaran, are described from the Nama Group (Namibia) by Gibson et al. (2025).
- Surprenant & Droser (2025) develop a growth model for Funisia dorothea, providing evidence of a growth pattern different from that of Wutubus annularis.
- Elias et al. (2025) describe superficially coral-like fossils from the Cambrian Mural Formation (Alberta and British Columbia, Canada), assigned to the species Rosellatana jamesi and interpreted as indicative of affinities with hypercalcified sponges.
- Evidence of similarity of growth and mortality dynamics of Parvancorina minchami and extant small marine invertebrates is presented by Ivantsov et al. (2025).
- Zhao et al. (2025) describe disc-like fossils from the Ediacaran Dengying Formation (China), preserving possibly remnants of the perioral musculature and innervation, and interpreted as probable fossils of eumetazoan-grade organisms.
- Dunn, Donoghue & Liu (2025) describe a population of Fractofusus andersoni from the Mistaken Point Ecological Reserve (Newfoundland, Canada), and present a model of growth in the studied taxon.
- Stephenson et al. (2025) report evidence from the study of fossils from the Ediacaran strata in Newfoundland (Canada) indicating that fragmentation of full specimens Fractofusus andersoni during disturbance events resulted in recolonization of the substrate on the basis reproductively active fragments, but find no evidence that survival of exceptionally large specimens of frondose taxa during the disturbance events resulted in a significant local recolonization afterwards, and argue that these differences are consistent with capacity of Avalon taxa to exhibit both local recolonization and long-distance dispersal.
- Wu et al. (2025) describe fossil material of Charnia masoni and C. gracilis from the Ediacaran Zhoujieshan Formation (China), extending known geographic distribution of Charnia and demonstrating that it likely persisted into the latest Ediacaran.
- Evidence from the study of extant demosponges, supporting the interpretation of C_{31} steranes in Neoproterozoic rocks as linked to the emergence of early sponges, is presented by Shawar et al. (2025).
- Jia et al. (2025) study the composition of the assemblage of sponge spicules from the Cambrian Qingxi Formation in the Sanjiang area (Guangxi, China), reporting evidence of presence of complex forms such as pentactines and orthotetraenes.
- Zhang et al. (2025) describe sponge spicule tufts from the Cambrian (Fortunian) lower Yanjiahe Formation (China), representing some of the oldest fossils of biomineralized sponges reported to date.
- Olivier et al. (2025) identify probable chaetetid fossil material from the Triassic (Olenekian) strata in Rock Canyon (Arizona, United States), representing the oldest Mesozoic record of chaetetids reported to date.
- Becker-Kerber et al. (2025) reevaluate skeletal organization of Corumbella on the basis of the study of new specimens from the Ediacaran Tamengo Formation (Brazil), interpreted as inconsistent with close affinities with scyphozoan cnidarians.
- Kershaw & Li (2025) review the evolutionary history of hypercalcified sponges.
- A study on possible causes of decline of stromatoporoid diversity during the early Devonian is published by Stock et al. (2025).
- Huang, Sendino & Kershaw (2025) revise the fossil material of Devonian stromatoporoids from collections of the Natural History Museum, London, and revise the biogeography of Devonian stromatoporoids.
- Wistort et al. (2025) identify cylindrical chert concretions from the Phosphoria Rock Complex as cryptic body fossils of Permian sponges rather than trace fossils, and interpret the studied sponges as likely partially growing above the sediment-water interface and partially buried within the substrate during their life, similar to modern sponges living within loose or unconsolidated sediments.
- Purported early mollusc Shishania aculeata is reinterpreted as a chancelloriid by Yang et al. (2025).
- Hu et al. (2025) report evidence of exceptional preservation of organic templates in chancelloriid sclerites from the Cambrian Houjiashan Formation (China), interpret their arrangement as indicating that the biomineralization of chancelloriid sclerites was controlled by epithelial cells, and interpret the biomineralization mode of chancelloriids as suggestive of their affinities with eumetazoans.
- Yun et al. (2025) report evidence of preservation of integument microstructures in chancelloriid fossils from the Cambrian Yu'anshan Formation (China) and study the phylogenetic affinities of chancelloriids, recovering them as epitheliozoans most likely sharing a more recent common ancestor with eumetazoans than with placozoans.
- A study on locomotory trace fossils from 12 formations from the Ediacaran-Cambrian transition, providing evidence of presence of probable bilateral eumetazoans with slender bodies with anterior-posterior body axes around 545 million years ago, is published by Wang & Miguez-Salas (2025).
- Knaust & Duarte (2025) report the preservation of nemertean, polychaete and nematode fossils from the limestone and marlstone succession of the Pliensbachian Vale das Fontes and Lemede formations at the Global Boundary Stratotype Section and Point at Peniche (Portugal), and study the taphonomy of the described fossils.
- Evidence from the study of Cambrian scalidophoran fossils, interpreted as indicating that the ventral nerve cord was ancestrally unpaired in scalidophorans, priapulids and possibly ecdysozoans in general, is presented by Wang et al. (2025).
- Knaust (2025) identifies early Paleozoic trace fossils assigned to the ichnotaxon Skolithos linearis as most likely to be priapulid burrows.
- Liu & Liu (2025) identify morphological differences between Corynetis brevis and C. fortis interpreted as likely related to different anchoring strategies, and report evidence of presence of two rows encircling the mouth of Corynetis, interpreted as likely having a sensory function.
- Kovář & Fatka (2025) describe new lobopodian fossil material from the Cambrian Jince Formation (Czech Republic), extending known record of Cambrian hallucigeniid/luolishaniid lobopodians into the Drumian.
- Knecht et al. (2025) redescribe Palaeocampa anthrax, interpret it as the youngest known "xenusiid" lobopodian, and report evidence of sclerite architecture distinct from those of other lobopodians, possibly related to the ability to secrete defensive chemicals.
- Monge-Nájera & Añino (2025) argue that timing of diversification of extant onychophoran taxa from published DNA phylogenies indicates that indicative of survival of multiple onychophoran lineages through the Cretaceous–Paleogene extinction event in the areas affected by the Chicxulub impact.
- Slater (2025) describes Cambrian protoconodonts preserved as small carbonaceous fossils from the Lontova Formation (Estonia) and from the Borgholm Formation (Sweden), and interprets the studied fossils as indicating that bilaterians with chaetognath-like grasping spines diverged by the latest Ediacaran.
- Nanglu et al. (2025) identify borings in shells of the bivalve Babinka from the Ordovician Fezouata Formation (Morocco) interpreted as produced by parasitic polychaetes and possibly representing the oldest known fossil evidence of spionids.
- Gómez, di Pasquo & Silvestri (2025) study two assemblages of Ordovician scolecodonts from the La Pola and Don Braulio formations (Argentina), and report evidence of differences in composition of the two studied assemblages, interpreted as related to tectonic activity, sea level changes, glacial events and extinctions across the Katian-Hirnantian.
- Gao et al. (2025) describe new scolecodonts from the Silurian Miaogao Formation (Yunnan, China), extending known geographical range of members of the genus Langeites.
- Shcherbakov et al. (2025) identify oligochaete cocoons in the Permian (Lopingian) strata of the Karaungir Lagerstätte (Kazakhstan), representing the oldest undoubted record of members of Clitellata reported to date.
- Jamison-Todd et al. (2025) study trace fossils in marine reptile bones from the Upper Cretaceous Chalk Group (United Kingdom), produced by bone-eating worms and interpreted as likely indicative of high species diversity of Osedax during the early Late Cretaceous, and name new ichnotaxa Osspecus eunicefootia, O. morsus, O. campanicum, O. arboreum, O. automedon, O. frumentum and O. panatlanticum.
- Jamison-Todd, Mannion & Upchurch (2025) identify boring produced by bone-eating worms in cetacean specimens from the Cenozoic strata from the Netherlands and the United States, including a specimen of Zyghorhiza kochii from the Eocene Yazoo Formation (Alabama) representing the oldest cetacean specimen with such borings reported to date, report evidence of high morphological diversity of the studied borings, and name a new ichnotaxon Osspecus pollardium described on the basis of borings from two teeth from the Neogene strata in the Netherlands.
- Kiel et al. (2025) report evidence of presence of trace fossils produced by Osedax-like worms in a tympanic bulla of an Oligocene baleen whale from the Lincoln Creek Formation (Washington, United States), in spite of the bone of the studied bulla being as dense as those of extant whales, and identify collagen-bearing body parts of marine animals as possible sources of nutrients for Osedax.
- Collareta et al. (2025) identify trace fossils preserved in shark teeth from the Pliocene offshore deposits of Tuscany (Italy) providing the first fossil evidence that Osedax-like worms fed on shark tooth dentine.
- The oldest pectinariid fossils from North America reported to date are described from the Eocene or Oligocene strata of the Quimper and Makah formations (Washington, United States) by Kočí, Goedert & Rich (2025).
- Evidence from the study of hyoliths from the Cambrian Sellick Hill Formation (Australia) and Ordovician Mójcza Limestone (Poland), indicative of similarities of early ontogeny of hyoliths and molluscs, is presented by Dzik (2025).
- A study on fossil material of the tommotiid Lapworthella fasciculata from the Cambrian strata in Australia is published by Bicknell et al. (2025), who report evidence of increase of thickness of sclerites of L. fasciculata and increase of the frequency of perforated sclerites through time, and interpret these findings as the oldest evidence of evolutionary arms race between predator and prey reported to date.
- Vinn et al. (2025) describe soft body impressions of Devonian tentaculitids from Armenia, and interpret reconstructed muscle system of tentaculitids as supporting their placement within Lophotrochozoa and possibly within Lophophorata.
- New information on the morphology and growth pattern of the microconchid species Aculeiconchus sandbergi is provided by Opitek et al. (2025).
- Pérez & Gomes (2025) argue that introduction of a replacement name Dendrobrachion for a phylum of entoproct-like animals from Cambrian named by Hou et al. (2006), was unwarranted, and resurrect the phylum name Dendrobrachia for the group including Phlogites.
- Ma et al. (2025) describe fossil material of Pomatrum cf. P. ventralis from the Balang Formation (China), extending known range of this species to Cambrian Stage 4 and representing its first known record from outside the Chengjiang Biota.
- A study on the taphonomy of yunnanozoan fossils from the Chengjiang Lagerstätte (China) is published by He et al. (2025), who contest claims of preservation of cellular cartilage and microfibrils made by Tian et al. (2022), and argue that cellular-scale preservation of cartilaginous tissues in the studied fossils is unlikely.

== Foraminifera ==
Name	Novelty	Status	Authors	Age	Type locality	Location	Notes	Images
Alexnoguesina	Nom. nov	Valid	Consorti, Caus & Le Coze	Late Cretaceous		Spain	A replacement name for Alexina Hottinger & Caus (2009).	
Bolivilongella	Gen. et 2 sp. nov	Valid	Ismail et al.	Miocene		Egypt	A member of Bolivinoididae. Genus includes B. longata and B. semilongata.	
Borelis dizerae	Sp. nov		Acar & Bozkurt	Eocene (Priabonian)		Turkey	A member of the family Alveolinidae.	
Borelis sozerii	Sp. nov		Acar & Bozkurt	Eocene (Priabonian)		Turkey	A member of the family Alveolinidae.	
Bulbobaculites attashensis	Sp. nov	Valid	Jalloh & Kaminski in Jalloh et al.	Middle Jurassic (Callovian)	Dhruma Formation	Saudi Arabia	A member of Lituolida belonging to the family Ammobaculinidae.	
Calvezina anatolica	Sp. nov		Altıner et al.	Permian (Changhsingian)		Turkey	A member of Nodosariata belonging to the family Robuloididae.	
Canalispina zagrosia	Sp. nov		Ghanbarloo, Safari & Görmüş	Late Cretaceous (Campanian to Maastrichtian)	Tarbur Formation	Iran	A member of the family Siderolitidae.	
Eoforschia vachardi	Nom. nov	Valid	Le Coze et al.	Carboniferous (Tournaisian)		Russia	A replacement name for Tournayella moelleri var. uralica Malakhova (1956).	
Eomarginulinella galinae	Sp. nov		Altıner et al.	Permian (Changhsingian)		Turkey	A member of Nodosariata belonging to the family Robuloididae.	
Eoturrispiroides compactus vachardi	Nom. nov	Valid	Le Coze et al.	Carboniferous (Bashkirian)			A replacement name for Ammodiscus compactus var. maxima Potievskaya (1958).	
Flabellogaudryina	Gen. et sp. nov	Valid	Kaminski & Korin	Eocene	Rashrashiyah Formation	Saudi Arabia	A member of Pseudogaudryininae. The type species is F. sirhanensis.	
Frondicularia arctica	Sp. nov	Valid	Yadrenkin	Triassic		Russia		
Gavelinella praestelligera	Sp. nov		Jarvis, Dubicka & Chroustová	Late Cretaceous (Santonian)	Seaford Chalk Formation	Ukraine; United Kingdom		
Gavelinella praethalmanni	Sp. nov		Jarvis, Dubicka & Chroustová	Late Cretaceous (Coniacian)	Seaford Chalk Formation	United Kingdom		
Gavelinella praetumida	Sp. nov		Jarvis, Dubicka & Chroustová	Late Cretaceous (Coniacian)	Lewes Nodular Chalk Formation	United Kingdom		
Glomomidiellopsis? okayi	Sp. nov		Altıner et al.	Permian (Capitanian to Changhsingian)		Cambodia; Turkey	A member of Miliolata belonging to the family Hemigordiopsidae.	
Globoomphalotis vachardi	Nom. nov	Valid	Le Coze et al.	Carboniferous (Viséan)		Russia (Perm Krai)	A replacement name for Endothyra magna Grozdilova & Lebedeva (1954).	
Glomospira kaminskii	Sp. nov	Valid	Hikmahtiar	Paleocene (Danian)	Scaglia Rossa Formation	Italy	A member of the family Ammodiscidae.	
Gusicella complexa	Sp. nov	Valid	Schlagintweit & Rashidi in Schlagintweit et al.	Late Cretaceous (Maastrichtian)	Tarbur Formation	Iran	A member of the family Orbitolinidae.	
Hereceina	Gen. et sp. nov		Acar & Bozkurt	Eocene (Priabonian)		Turkey	A calcarinid. The type species is H. spinigera.	
Ichthyofrondina vachardi	Nom. nov	Valid	Le Coze et al.	Permian (Changhsingian)	Nikitin Formation	Russia	A replacement name for Frondicularia ornata Miklukho-Maklay (1954).	
Kristanita	Gen. et comb. nov		Falzoni, Rettori & Gale in Falzoni et al.	Late Triassic and Early Jurassic		Australia; Austria; Gibraltar; Greece; Italy; Japan; Myanmar; Slovakia; Slovenia; Thailand; Timor-Leste	A member of Ammodiscana belonging to the order Ataxophragmiida and the family Duotaxidae. The type species is "Tetrataxis" humilis Kristan (1957); genus also includes "Tetrataxis" inflata Kristan (1957).	
Laxoendothyra parakosvensis gracilis	Ssp. nov		Okuyucu et al.	Devonian-Carboniferous transition	Yılanlı Formation	Turkey		
Loftusia tarburica	Sp. nov		Ghanbarloo, Safari & Görmüş	Late Cretaceous (Maastrichtian)	Tarbur Formation	Iran	A member of the family Loftusiidae.	
Mediocris vachardi	Nom. nov	Valid	Le Coze et al.	Carboniferous (Viséan)		Russia (Komi Republic)	A replacement name for Eostaffella mediocris var. minima Durkina (1959).	
Nestellorella vachardi	Nom. nov	Valid	Le Coze et al.	Permian (Artinskian)		Russia (Bashkortostan)	A replacement name for Nodosaria parva Lipina (1949).	
Nigrispiroides	Gen. et comb. nov		Krainer, Lucas & Vachard	Carboniferous		Brazil; Canada (Yukon); Iran; Peru; United States (Arkansas; Idaho; New Mexico; Oklahoma; Texas)	The type species is "Monotaxinoides" melanogaster Yarahmadzahi & Vachard (2019).	
Omphalocyclus tarburensis	Sp. nov		Ghanbarloo, Safari & Görmüş	Late Cretaceous (Maastrichtian)	Tarbur Formation	Iran	A member of the family Orbitoididae.	
Paraglobivalvulina? intermedia	Sp. nov		Altıner et al.	Permian (Capitanian to Changhsingian)		Turkey	A member of Fusulinata belonging to the family Globivalvulinidae.	
Planogloboendothyra arcuata vachardi	Nom. nov	Valid	Le Coze et al.	Carboniferous (Viséan)		Russia	A replacement name for Endothyra arcuata var. evoluta Lebedeva (1954).	
Plectorobuloides	Gen. et sp. nov		Altıner et al.	Permian (Changhsingian)		Turkey	A member of Nodosariata belonging to the family Robuloididae. The type species is P. taurica.	
Pojarkovella nibelis vachardi	Nom. nov	Valid	Le Coze et al.	Carboniferous (Viséan)		Uzbekistan	A replacement name for Eostaffella (?) nibelis subsp. lata Mikhno in Mikhno & Balakin (1975).	
Protostensioeina ukrainica	Sp. nov		Jarvis, Dubicka & Chroustová	Late Cretaceous (Santonian)	Seaford Chalk Formation	Ukraine; United Kingdom		
Pseudobiseriella	Gen. et sp. et comb. nov	Valid	Sheng & Brenckle	Carboniferous (Serpukhovian)	Menard Limestone	Kazakhstan; United States (Alabama; Georgia (U.S. state); Illinois); Canada? (Nova Scotia)	A member of Fusulinata belonging to the family Globivalvulinidae. The type species is P. menardensis; genus also includes "Dzhamansorina" kipshakensis Marfenkova (1991).	
Pseudocryptomorphina	Gen. et sp. nov		Altıner et al.	Permian (Changhsingian)		Turkey	A member of Nodosariata, possibly belonging to the family Robuloididae. The type species is P. amplimuralis.	
Pseudolangella vachardi	Nom. nov	Valid	Le Coze et al.	Permian		Russia (Bashkortostan)	A replacement name for Nodosaria elegantissima Suleymanov (1949).	
Pseudomidiella sahini	Sp. nov		Altıner et al.	Permian (Changhsingian)		Turkey	A member of Miliolata belonging to the family Midiellidae.	
Pseudorobuloides	Gen. et sp. nov		Altıner et al.	Permian (Lopingian)		Iran; Turkey	A member of Nodosariata belonging to the family Robuloididae. The type species is P. reicheli.	
Pualacana	Gen. et 2 sp. et comb. nov	Valid	Barros, Haig & McCartain	Middle and Late Triassic	Aitutu Group	China; Italy; Timor-Leste; United States (Alaska)	A member of the family Variostomatidae. The type species is P. hortai; genus also includes new species P. xananai, as well as P. bilimbata (Hu in He & Hu, 1977), P. acutoangulata (Kristan-Tollmann, 1973), P. catilliforme (Kristan-Tollmann, 1960), P. cochlea (Kristan-Tollmann, 1960), P. crassum (Kristan-Tollmann, 1960), P. exile (Kristan-Tollmann, 1960), P. falcata (Kristan-Tollmann, 1973), P. hadrolimbata (Hu in He & Hu, 1977), P. helicta (Tappan, 1951), P. oberhauseri (Vettorel, 1988) and P. pralongense (Kristan-Tollmann, 1960).	
Robuloides lata	Sp. nov		Altıner et al.	Permian (Changhsingian)		Turkey	A member of Nodosariata belonging to the family Robuloididae.	
Robuloides? rettorii	Sp. nov		Altıner et al.	Permian (Changhsingian)		Turkey	A member of Nodosariata belonging to the family Robuloididae.	
Robustopachyphloia farinacciae	Sp. nov		Altıner et al.	Permian (Changhsingian)		Turkey	A member of Nodosariata belonging to the family Pachyphloiidae.	
Semiendothyra vachardi	Nom. nov	Valid	Le Coze et al.	Carboniferous (Moscovian)		Russia	A replacement name for Endothyra bradyi var. simplex Reitlinger (1950).	
Siderolites persica	Sp. nov		Ghanbarloo, Safari & Görmüş	Late Cretaceous (Maastrichtian)	Tarbur Formation	Iran	A member of the family Siderolitidae.	
Solakiana	Gen. et comb. nov		Schlagintweit	Late Cretaceous (Turonian)		Turkey	A probable member of the family Charentiidae. The type species is "Fleuryana" gediki Solak, Taslı & Koç (2020).	
Solimanina	Gen. et comb. nov		Shreif et al.	Eocene		Egypt	A nummulitid. The type species is "Operculina" canalifera d'Archiac & Haime (1853).	
Stensioeina praeexsculpta	Sp. nov		Jarvis, Dubicka & Chroustová	Late Cretaceous (Coniacian)	Seaford Chalk Formation	United Kingdom		

=== Foraminiferal research ===
- A study on the impact of ocean chemistry changes on evolution of foraminiferal wall types throughout the Phanerozoic is published by Faulkner et al. (2025), who find that changes of foraminiferal wall types were mostly driven by short-term ocean chemistry changes.
- The first fossil material of Devonian foraminifera from northern Gondwana reported to date is described from the Mader Basin (Morocco) by Dubicka & Rakociński (2025).
- Zhang et al. (2025) study the fossil record of Carboniferous and Permian fusuline forams, and report evidence indicating that warming events resulted in diversity losses in the studied group, while long-term cooling promoted its diversification.
- Evidence from the study of Carnian foraminiferal assemblages from the Erguan section in Guizhou and Quxia section in South Tibet (China), interpreted as indicating that there were no significant extinctions of foraminifera during the Carnian pluvial episode in the studied regions, is presented by Li et al. (2025).
- Evidence from the study of foraminifera from the Cretaceous-Paleogene section from Bidart (France), indicating that the calcification stress related to Deccan volcanism affected planktic foraminifera but did not significantly affect benthic foraminifera, is presented by Patra et al. (2025).
- A study on changes of composition of benthic foraminiferal assemblages from the Scaglia Rossa Formation (Italy), providing evidence of shifts in the type of organic matter available to benthic organisms rather than a complete collapse of flux of organic carbon to the seafloor during the Cretaceous-Paleogene transition, is published by Kaminski, Hikmahtiar & Cetean (2025).
- A study on the composition of planktic foraminiferal assemblages from the Atlantic Ocean during the Eocene, providing evidence that they lacked resilience during the Middle Eocene Climatic Optimum, is published by Sigismondi et al. (2025).
- The oldest known fossils of members of Pavonitininae are described from the Priabonian strata of the Rashrashiyah Formation (Saudi Arabia) by Korin et al. (2025).
- Evidence of changes in morphology of members of nummulites from the Pande Formation (Tanzania), interpreted as likely related to environmental changes during the Eocene–Oligocene transition, is presented by Koorapati, Moon & Cotton (2025).
- Dowsett et al. (2025) study the fossil record of planktic foraminifera from the Pliocene, and interpret their findings as overall indicative of stable temperature preferences of members of the studied species since the Late Pliocene.

== Other organisms ==
Name	Novelty	Status	Authors	Age	Type locality	Location	Notes	Images
Angochitina bascomae	Sp. nov	Valid	Esteves et al.	Ordovician (Katian)	Kope Formation	United States (Kentucky)	A chitinozoan.	
Angochitina lingliensis	Sp. nov	Valid	Wu, Liang & Lu	Devonian	Nahkaoling Formation	China	A chitinozoan.	
Anthochitina admirabilis	Sp. nov	Valid	Jonckheere et al.	Silurian	Jupiter Formation	Canada (Quebec)	A chitinozoan.	
Baltisphaeridium iranense	Sp. nov		Ghavidel-Syooki	Ordovician	Ghelli Formation	Iran	An acritarch.	
Baltisphaeridium tillabadensis	Sp. nov		Ghavidel-Syooki	Ordovician	Ghelli Formation	Iran	An acritarch.	
Belonechitina iranense	Sp. nov		Ghavidel-Syooki	Ordovician	Ghelli Formation	Iran	A chitinozoan.	
Belonechitina laciniata	Sp. nov	Valid	Esteves et al.	Ordovician (Katian)	Grant Lake Limestone	United States (Kentucky)	A chitinozoan.	
Bullatosphaera? colliformis	Sp. nov	Valid	Ouyang et al.	Ediacaran	Doushantuo Formation	China	An acanthomorph acritarch.	
Bursachitina praedolioliformis	Sp. nov	Valid	Jonckheere et al.	Silurian	Jupiter Formation	Canada (Quebec)	A chitinozoan.	
Clathrochitina mangle	Sp. nov	Valid	Esteves et al.	Ordovician (Katian)	Kope Formation	United States (Kentucky)	A chitinozoan.	
Conochitina rudis	Sp. nov	Valid	Esteves et al.	Ordovician (Katian)	Bull Fork Formation	United States (Kentucky)	A chitinozoan.	
Corollasphaeridium lissum	Sp. nov		Green et al.	Cambrian	Forteau Formation	Canada (Newfoundland and Labrador)	A eukaryote of uncertain affinities, possibly a testate/loricate protist.	
Cornuferifusa persianense	Sp. nov		Ghavidel-Syooki	Ordovician	Ghelli Formation	Iran	An acritarch.	
Cyathochitina triangula	Sp. nov	Valid	Jonckheere et al.	Silurian	Merrimack Formation	Canada (Quebec)	A chitinozoan.	
Cycliomedusa	Gen. et sp. nov		Zhao et al.	Ediacaran	Dengying Formation	China	A discoidal macrofossil, reminiscent of the medusae and other medusoid forms from the Neoproterozoic. The type species is C. jiangchuanensis.	
Dorsennidium iranense	Sp. nov		Ghavidel-Syooki	Ordovician	Ghelli Formation	Iran	An acritarch.	
Eotylotopalla inflata	Sp. nov	Valid	Ouyang et al.	Ediacaran	Doushantuo Formation	China	An acanthomorph acritarch.	
Excultibrachium jahandidehii	Sp. nov		Ghavidel-Syooki	Ordovician	Ghelli Formation	Iran	An acritarch.	
Hensonidendra	Gen. et 2 sp. nov	Valid	Peel	Cambrian (Wuliuan)	Henson Gletscher Formation	Greenland	An organism of uncertain affinities, with similarities to cyanobacteria from the family Epiphytaceae. The type species is H. tavsenica; genus also includes H. hensoniensis.	
Hercochitina andresenae	Sp. nov	Valid	Esteves et al.	Ordovician (Katian)	Kope Formation	United States (Kentucky)	A chitinozoan.	
Hercochitina anningae	Sp. nov	Valid	Esteves et al.	Ordovician (Katian)	Kope Formation	United States (Kentucky)	A chitinozoan.	
Hercochitina edingerae	Sp. nov	Valid	Esteves et al.	Ordovician (Katian)	Point Pleasant Formation	United States (Kentucky)	A chitinozoan.	
Hercochitina krafftae	Sp. nov	Valid	Esteves et al.	Ordovician (Katian)	Kope Formation	United States (Kentucky)	A chitinozoan.	
Hercochitina polygonia	Sp. nov	Valid	Esteves et al.	Ordovician (Katian)	Bull Fork Formation	United States (Kentucky)	A chitinozoan.	
Hercochitina tharpae	Sp. nov	Valid	Esteves et al.	Ordovician (Katian)	Kope Formation	United States (Kentucky)	A chitinozoan.	
Lagenochitina postpirum	Sp. nov		Camina et al.	Devonian	Los Monos Formation	Argentina	A chitinozoan.	
Laugephakos	Gen. et sp. nov	Valid	Peel	Cambrian (Wuliuan)	Henson Gletscher Formation	Greenland	Tubes of an organism of uncertain affinities. The type species is L. groenlandicus.	
Lydonia	Gen. et sp. nov	Valid	Pasinetti et al.	Ediacaran	Trepassey Formation	Canada (Newfoundland and Labrador)	An organism of uncertain affinities, with similarities to sponges. The type species is L. jiggamintia.	
Minimarmilla	Gen. et sp. nov	Valid	Rodriguez Dzul et al.	Neoproterozoic	Diabaig Formation	United Kingdom	An organic-walled microfossil, representing either a large cyanobacterial aggregate or a microalga. The type species is M. multicatenaria.	
Navifusa caspiansis	Sp. nov		Ghavidel-Syooki	Ordovician	Ghelli Formation	Iran	An acritarch.	
Nevadachitina soufianei	Sp. nov	Valid	Esteves et al.	Ordovician (Katian)	Bull Fork Formation	United States (Kentucky)	A chitinozoan.	
Nyfrieslandia kelimoli	Sp. nov		Wu et al.	Ordovician (Darriwilian)	Kelimoli Formation	China	A radiolarian.	
Oppilatala persianense	Sp. nov		Ghavidel-Syooki	Ordovician	Ghelli Formation	Iran	An acritarch.	
Pachytibia	Gen. nov	Valid	Xiao et al.	Cambrian		China	A cyanobacterium.	
Pirea shahroudensis	Sp. nov		Ghavidel-Syooki	Ordovician	Ghelli Formation	Iran	An acritarch.	
Pistillachitina alborzensis	Sp. nov		Ghavidel-Syooki	Ordovician	Ghelli Formation	Iran	A chitinozoan.	
Pistillachitina iranense	Sp. nov		Ghavidel-Syooki	Ordovician	Ghelli Formation	Iran	A chitinozoan.	
Plectochitina anulata	Sp. nov	Valid	Jonckheere et al.	Silurian	Menier Formation	Canada (Quebec)	A chitinozoan.	
Plectochitina triplesiensis	Sp. nov	Valid	Jonckheere et al.	Silurian	Menier Formation	Canada (Quebec)	A chitinozoan.	
Pyramidinium	Gen. et sp. nov	Valid	Razumkova	Cretaceous (Albian–Cenomanian)		Russia	An acritarch. Genus includes new species P. annulatum.	
Ramochitina durandi	Sp. nov		Camina et al.	Devonian	Los Monos Formation	Argentina	A chitinozoan.	
Spinicapsa	Gen. et sp. nov	Valid	Vishnevskaya	Cretaceous	Upper Bazhenov Formation	Russia	A radiolarian of family Echinocampidae. The type species is S. gatovskii.	
Stellechinatum khoshyeilaghensis	Sp. nov		Ghavidel-Syooki	Ordovician	Ghelli Formation	Iran	An acritarch.	
Streptubularia	Gen. nov	Valid	Xiao et al.	Cambrian		China	A cyanobacterium.	
Tanuchitina hooksae	Sp. nov	Valid	Esteves et al.	Ordovician (Katian)	Bull Fork Formation	United States (Kentucky)	A chitinozoan.	
Trilobatina	Gen. et sp. nov	Valid	Razumkova	Late Cretaceous (Cenomanian)	Uvat Formation	Russia	An acritarch. Genus includes new species T. angusta.	
Verrucosphaera? undulata	Sp. nov	Valid	Ouyang et al.	Ediacaran	Doushantuo Formation	China	An acanthomorph acritarch.	

=== Research on other organisms ===
- Evidence from the study of microbial DNA from mammoth remains spanning over 1 million years, indicative of presence of host-associated microbes related to extant members of the genera Actinobacillus, Erysipelothrix, Streptococcus and Pasteurella (including relatives of extant bacteria linked to the deaths of African elephants), is presented by Guinet et al. (2025).
- Review of the fossil record of the late Paleoproterozoic to the latest Tonian eukaryotes and a study on their diversity patterns is published by Porter et al. (2025), who find the fossil evidence insufficient to conclude whether the Tonian radiation of eukaryotes was a real event or an artifact of sampling of the fossil record.
- Evidence from the study of microfossils from the 1.78–1.73 billion years old McDermott Formation (Australia), indicative of diversity of morphologies, feeding strategies and behavior of early eukaryotes, is presented by Javaux (2025).
- Saint Martin et al. (2025) identify body fossils of Palaeopascichnus in the Neoproterozoic Histria Formation (Romania), providing evidence of the Ediacaran age of the studied formation.
- A new assemblage of probable tubular microfossils of silicified soft-bodied organisms, with a preservation mode different from other known Neoproterozoic fossils, is described from the Dzhetym Group (Kyrgyzstan) by Moore et al. (2025).
- Chen et al. (2025) describe vendotaenid fossils from the Ediacaran Tabia Member of the Adoudou Formation (Morocco) and study the temporal distribution of Lanceoforma, Tyrasotaenia and Vendotaenia, reporting that the three taxa appeared before the Ediacaran.
- Kolesnikov, Pan'kova & Pan'kov (2025) report the discovery of a new assemblage of soft-bodied organisms from the Ediacaran Chernyi Kamen Formation (Russia), including fossils of Palaeopascichnus, Mawsonites, Hiemalora and putative rangeomorphs.
- Lonsdale et al. (2025) describe ribbon-like fossils from the Ediacaran Deep Spring Formation (Nevada, United States), interpreted as probable fossil material of vendotaenids and extending their known geographical range during the late Ediacaran.
- Evidence of sustained shift in morphology of organic-walled microfossils during the Ediacaran-Cambrian transition, interpreted as likely linked to nutrient limitation resulting from environmental perturbations, is presented by Tingle et al. (2025).
- Xiao et al. (2025) study the fossil record of radiolarians from the middle Permian to Middle Triassic, and find evidence of different trends of evolution of body size in members of four radiolarian orders and in radiolarians from different latitudes during the Permian–Triassic extinction event.
- Fossil evidence of survival of albaillellarian radiolarians into the Triassic is reported from the Nanpihe bridge section of the Changning-Menglian belt (Yunnan, China) by Zheng et al. (2025).
- Erba et al. (2025) identify calcareous nannofossils in the Lower and Middle Triassic marine successions from South China, extending known fossil record of coccolithophores to the Early Triassic.
- Slater, Demangel & Richoz (2025) identify impressions of calcium carbonate skeletons of coccolithophores in the Ladinian strata from Austria and Switzerland, and interpret this finding as suggestive of a diversification of marine calcifying organisms after the Permian–Triassic extinction event, resulting in the first appearance (or reappearance of Lazarus taxa after this extinction event) of several unrelated marine calcifiers coinciding with the first appearance of coccolithophores.
- Evidence from the study of new calcareous nannofossil assemblage data from the Campbell Plateau (Pacific Ocean), indicative of changes in the composition of nannoplankton approximately 200,000 years before the onset of the Paleocene–Eocene Thermal Maximum, is presented by Jones et al. (2025), who interpret the reported changes as related to a previously unrecognized precursor event evidenced by decrease in bulk sediment δ^{13}C and likely associated with warming and unstable surface ocean environments.
- Vodička et al. (2025) report the discovery of an assemblage of Margachitina margaritana from the Silurian strata of the Builth Mudstones Formation (United Kingdom), interpreted as resulting from egg laying and as evidence supporting the animal affinities of chitinozoans.

== History of life in general ==
- Wong et al. (2025) use supervised machine learning to identify biogenic molecular assemblages in Paleoarchean rocks and evidence of photosynthesizing organisms in Neoarchean rocks.
- A study on rare Earth element data from greenstone belts of the northwest Superior Craton (Canada), interpreted as evidence of the origin of oxygenic photosynthesis in the Mesoarchaean or earlier, is published by Patry et al. (2025).
- Trail-like features, including one resembling fossil/trace fossil Bunyerichnus and possibly of biogenic origin, are described from the Tonian strata from the Sirbu Shale Member of the Upper Vindhyan Group (India) by Choudhuri et al. (2025).
- Evidence from experiments with algal-derived particulate matter in conditions similar to those of the late Neoproterozoic water column, interpreted as indicating that the appearance of algal particulate matter at the seafloor during the Neoproterozoic rise of the algae likely stimulated growth and activity of phagotrophs living in the anoxic conditions, is presented by Mills et al. (2025).
- Evidence from the study of two Ediacaran communities from the Mistaken Point Formation (Canada), indicative of similar composition but different ecological dynamics of the studied communities, is presented by Mitchell et al. (2025).
- Azizi et al. (2025) describe trace and body fossils from the Ediacaran Tabia Member of the Adoudou Formation (Morocco), providing evidence of stratigraphic overlap of soft-bodied Ediacaran biota and animal trace fossils.
- Evidence from the study of trace fossils from the Ediacaran Dengying Formation (China), indicative of emergence of complex bioturbation behaviors before the Cambrian explosion and coinciding with the first major extinction pulse of Ediacara-type organisms, is presented by Chen & Liu (2025), who name a new ichnotaxon Treptichnus streptosus.
- A new Ediacaran Lagerstätte (the Tongshan Lagerstätte), preserving fossils of typical Ediacaran rangeomorph fronds with Burgess Shale-type preservation, is reported from the Dengying Formation by Hou et al. (2025).
- Majeed et al. (2025) study the composition of the Ediacaran and Cambrian fossil assemblages from the Sirban Formation (Pakistan), expanding known biogeographic range of Dickinsonia, Kimberella and a suite of Cambrian trilobite taxa.
- Hammarlund et al. (2025) argue that expansion of sunlit benthic habitats with severe daily oxygen fluctuations during the Neoproterozoic-Paleozoic transition might have promoted the radiation of organisms tolerant to oxygen variability.
- Review of changes of organismal and community ecology during the Ediacaran-Cambrian transition is published by Mitchell & Pates (2025).
- Evidence of changes of composition of fossil assemblages from chert Lagerstätten from the Yangtze craton (China) during the Ediacaran-Cambrian transition is presented by Luo & Zhu (2025).
- Wang et al. (2025) study the smoothness of trace fossils from the Ediacaran–Cambrian transition, and link the appearance of smooth trace fossils during the latest Ediacaran with the rise of slender mobile bilaterians to dominance.
- Wood & Droser (2025) review evidence of evolution of animal reproductive styles throughout Ediacaran and Cambrian.
- Reijenga & Close (2025) study the fossil record of Phanerozoic marine animals, and argue that purported evidence of a relationship between the duration of studied clades and their rates of origination and extinction can be explained by incomplete fossil sampling.
- Benson et al. (2025) study the fossil record of marine invertebrates and attempt to determine latitudinal biodiversity distributions of marine invertebrates throughout the Phanerozoic.
- Evidence from the study of the fossil record of marine organisms, interpreted as indicative of coupling of variations of biomass and marine biodiversity trends throughout the Phanerozoic, is presented by Singh et al. (2025).
- A study aiming to determine drivers of changes of marine biodiversity patterns during the Phanerozoic on the basis of a macroecological model combined with global climate simulations is published by Balembois et al. (2025).
- Evidence from the study of the fossil record of marine animals, indicating that marine biodiversity in reef-supporting regions was disproportionately high compared to non-reef-supporting regions throughout the Phanerozoic, is presented by Close et al. (2025).
- Review of the ecology and evolution of endobionts associated with corals throughout the Phanerozoic is published by Vinn, Zapalski & Wilson (2025).
- Maletz et al. (2025) revise Paleozoic fossils with similarities to feathers, and interpret the studied fossil material as including remains of macroalgae, hydrozoan cnidarians and graptolites.
- White, Jensen & Barr (2025) interpret the unusual disparity of trace fossils from the High Head Member of the Cambrian Church Point Formation (Nova Scotia, Canada) as preserved because of a favourable combination of sedimentology and modern-day exposure, and argue that the studied assemblage might represent a more faithful record of deep-marine trace fossil disparity during the early Cambrian than observed in the majority of assemblages from other places.
- Evidence of the impact of the appearance and subsequent extinction of archaeocyath reefs on the abundance of Cambrian animals is presented by Pruss (2025).
- Revision of the Cambrian fauna from the Sæterdal Formation (Greenland), including fossils of trilobites, brachiopods and a hyolith, is published by Peel (2025).
- Mussini & Butterfield (2025) report the discovery of a new assemblage of small carbonaceous fossils from the Cambrian Hess River Formation (Northwest Territories, Canada), including remains of wiwaxiids, annelids, brachiopods, chaetognaths, scalidophorans, arthropods and pterobranchs.
- Murphy et al. (2025) study patterns of taxonomic and functional diversity of skeletal animals from the Siberian Platform from 529 to 508 million years ago, and report evidence of selective survival and extinction in the aftermath of the Sinsk event, including extinction of reef-associated groups with massive, heavily calcified skeletons, and diversification of groups of motile animals with diverse feeding strategies and habitat associations.
- A study on the composition of the Cambrian (Wuliuan) Kaili Biota from the Sanwan section in eastern Guizhou (China), and on ecospace occupation by members of this biota, is published by Zhang et al. (2025).
- Mussini et al. (2025) describe a middle Cambrian marine shelf biota, including priapulids, crustaceans and molluscs, on the basis of fossils from the Bright Angel Shale (Arizona, United States), and interpret the studied biota and Cambrian biotas with small carbonaceous fossils from other localities as consistent with emergence of phylogenetically derived and functionally sophisticated animals in habitable shallow marine environments (resulting in exclusion of earlier pioneer taxa), and with their protracted spillover into less habitable settings.
- Yang et al. (2025) report the discovery of fossil material of the Guanshan Biota from the strata of the Wulongqing Formation from new localities from the Malong-Yiliang area (Yunnan, China), providing evidence that geographical distribution of the Guanshan Biota was not restricted by the Xiaojiang Fault.
- A Burgess-Shale-type fauna occupying a peritidal habitat near the outer margin of a sea is described from the Cambrian (Guzhangian) Pika Formation (Alberta, Canada) by Mussini, Veenma & Butterfield (2025), providing new information ecological tolerances of Cambrian marine animals.
- A diverse fauna including agnostids, trilobites and small shelly fossils of various affinities is described from the Cambrian strata of the Thorntonia Limestone (Australia) by Betts et al. (2025).
- Mussini & Butterfield (2025) describe diverse assemblages of small carbonaceous fossils from the late Cambrian—early Ordovician Deadwood Formation and from the middle—late Ordovician Winnipeg Formation (North Dakota, United States), interpreted as fossil record of two invertebrate assemblages including taxa and morphologies unrecorded by contemporary macrofossils, and argue that exceptional Ordovician macrofossil sites may be unrepresentative of most of animal life in the Ordovician biosphere.
- Jeon, Li & Lee (2025) argue that the apparent sudden rise of diverse reef-building animals during the Great Ordovician Biodiversification Event is more likely an artifact of improved preservation conditions resulting from a global sea-level fall rather than a genuine evolutionary burst.
- A study on changes in composition of the Ordovician assemblages from the Makgol and Duwibong formations (South Korea), interpreted as indicative of regional variability of the Great Ordovician Biodiversification Event, is published by Seo, Cho & Choh (2025).
- Elicki (2025) describes new fossil material of bivalves, brachiopods and trilobites from the Ordovician strata in southern Jordan, and revises known Ordovician skeletal fauna from Jordan.
- Early evidence of colonization of gastropod shells by corals is reported from the Ordovician strata in Estonia by Vinn et al. (2025).
- Vinn et al. (2025) identify bumps on the surface of the pygidium of a specimen of Illaenus sp. from the Darriwilian strata from Estonia, interpreted as likely evidence of a parasitic infestation during the life of the trilobite.
- Liu et al. (2025) report the discovery of the first Ordovician (Katian) Konservat-Lagerstätte from the North China Craton, preserving fossils a new deep-water fauna (the Fuping Fauna).
- Evidence from the study of the trace fossil record ranging from the Ediacaran to the Devonian, interpreted as indicative of establishment of modern-style deep-marine benthic ecosystem during the Ordovician after 100 million years of protracted evolution, is presented by Buatois et al. (2025).
- Vinn et al. (2025) report new evidence of symbiotic associations between worms and tabulate corals from the Ordovician and Silurian strata in Estonia, including evidence of symbiotic relationships between tabulates and cornulitids spanning from the late Katian to the Ludfordian.
- Zhu et al. (2025) describe fossil remains of reefs constructed by sphinctozoans belonging to the group Colospongiinae and by binding organism Archaeolithoporella from the Ordovician strata of the Lianglitag Formation (China), providing evidence of presence of reefs with similarities to Permian sphinctozoan-dominated reefs as early as Katian.
- A study on changes of composition of marine invertebrate assemblages in the Cincinnati region during the Katian, as indicated by redefined stratigraphic framework, is published by Little & Brett (2025).
- Evidence from the study of the fossil record of microconchids and early land plants, indicating that evolution of land plants might have facilitated the dispersal of microconchids (and possibly other marine animals) that used plant remains as rafts, is presented by Yuan et al. (2025).
- Zhang et al. (2025) determine the timing and tempo of two phases of the Late Ordovician mass extinction on the basis of geochronological study of Ordovician-Silurian sections from the Yangtze Block (China), and link tempo of the extinction to rate of temperature change.
- Evidence indicating that biotic recovery in the aftermath of the Late Ordovician mass extinction was driven by increase of oceanic oxygenation initiated from surface in early Silurian (Rhuddanian) is presented by Zhang et al. (2025).
- Browning et al. (2025) describe trace fossils found within beds of the Soom Shale (South Africa) bearing fossilized marine snow, and interpret this finding as evidence of presence of a meiofaunal benthic community in the aftermath of the end-Ordovician extinction that fed on episodic concentrations of phytoplankton.
- Zong et al. (2025) report the discovery of a new assemblage of well-preserved fossils (the Huangshi Fauna) in the Silurian (Rhuddanian) strata in south China, including fossils of sponges, cephalopods, arthropods and carbon film fossils of uncertain identity.
- Strossová, Corradini & Corriga (2025) report the discovery of conodont elements in the facies of black graptolite shales from the Silurian (Telychian) Litohlavy Formation (Czech Republic), and argue that preservation of conodont elements close to the apertures of graptolite thecae might be evidence of a predatory or parasitic relationship between conodonts and graptolites.
- Zatoń et al. (2025) report evidence of widespread infestation of Devonian (Pragian) crinoid stems from the Hamar Laghdad locality (Morocco) by sclerobionts, and identify the stromatoporoid encrusting one of the stems as the oldest known record of the genus Ferestromatopora.
- The first mesophotic coral reef ecosystem reported from the Paleozoic of eastern Gondwana, preserving fossil remains of corals and a diversified fish fauna, is described from the Devonian (Emsian) strata of the shore of Lake Burrinjuck (Taemas Formation; New South Wales, Australia) by Zapalski et al. (2025).
- Brett et al. (2025) study changes of composition of Middle Devonian marine faunas from the Appalachian Basin in eastern North America, provide evidence that regional faunal turnovers coincide with recognized global bioevents, as well as evidence of range restriction and migration of marine animals during brief periods of faunal turnovers resulting in speciation within marginalized, isolated populations and subsequent reinvasion of abandoned areas by the new species, and interpret fossil evidence of stasis interrupted by faunal turnovers as consistent with the prevalence of punctuated equilibria.
- A new non-pollen palynomorph assemblage, including remains of plants, fungi and diverse animals, is described from the Devonian (Givetian/Frasnian) strata in Poland by Kondas et al. (2025).
- Dworczak, Szrek & Wilk (2025) describe trace fossils on placoderm bones from the Devonian strata in Poland, interpreted as produced by scavengers feeding on placoderm carcasses.
- A monobathrid crinoid specimen preserved inside a hexactinellid sponge, representing a possible case of commensalism, is described from the Devonian (Famennian) strata from Pennsylvania, United States (probably from the Knapp Formation) by Newman & Bush (2025).
- A study on the evolution of Late Devonian reef ecosystems from South China, as indicated by data from the Quanzhou section, is published by Zhang et al. (2025), who report evidence of decline of skeletal reef builders such as stromatoporoids before their final extinction, and evidence of a short-term local microbe bloom at the time of the upper Kellwasser event.
- Otoo (2025) reviews the research on community assembly in deep time, focusing on the origin of terrestrial communities during the late Paleozoic.
- A study on the mandibular morphology of Devonian to Permian stem and crown tetrapods is published by Berks et al. (2025), who report evidence of a spike in morphological diversity in the Gzhelian, interpreted as related to the evolution of herbivory.
- Ponstein et al. (2025) study functional and morphological diversity of mandibles of Carboniferous and Permian tetrapods, expanding on the dataset used by Anderson, Friedman & Ruta (2013), and report evidence of greater diversity of jaws of amniotes compared to other tetrapods from the early Permian onwards.
- Review of evidence of distribution and ecology of late Palezoic tetrapods from eastern Pangaea is published by Davydov et al. (2025), who interpret the initial dispersal of tetrapods into eastern Pangaea as likely linked to the development of the Precaspian Isthmus during the Asselian–Sakmarian transition.
- Lucas & Mansky (2025) revise invertebrate and vertebrate trace fossils from the Carboniferous (Mississippian) Horton Bluff Formation (Nova Scotia, Canada), name new ichnotaxa: fish traces Sonjawoodichnus monstrum and Doliosichnus sarjeanti, and tetrapod traces Thorakosichnus cameroni, Luctorichnus hunti and Pseudobradypus fillmorei, and interpret early tetrapodomorphs such as Panderichthys, Elpistostege and Tiktaalik as unlikely to be directly ancestral to tetrapods.
- Bronson et al. (2025) revise the fossil record of vertebrates from the Fayetteville Shale (Arkansas, United States) and their depositional environment.
- Voigt et al. (2025) describe vertebrate and invertebrate trace fossils from the Chinches Formation (Chile), interpret the studied formation as Pennsylvanian in age, and interpret tetrapod trace fossils from the Chinches Formation as evidence of presence of similar tetrapod faunas in the tropics and in mid-southern latitudes during the Pennsylvanian.
- A study on the fossil record of conodonts and carbon isotope of bulk rock from the Naqing, Narao and Shanglong sections in southern Guizhou (China), providing evidence of timing of biotic changes during the Moscovian and Kasimovian, is published by Wang et al. (2025).
- Bicknell et al. (2025) describe bromalites with xiphosuran shell remains from the Mazon Creek fossil beds (Illinois, United States), interpreted as evidence of presence of a durophagous predator (possibly a large lungfish) commonly consuming xiphosurans in the studied assemblage.
- A study on trace fossils from the Carboniferous-Permian strata of the Santa Fé Group (Brazil), providing evidence of presence of a low-diversity track assemblage (dominated by arthropod locomotion and grazing traces) during the Late Paleozoic icehouse, is published by de Barros et al. (2025).
- Rossignol et al. (2025) determine plants and animals (including branchiosaurid temnospondyls) from the Perdasdefogu Basin (Sardinia, Italy) to be most likely early Permian in age, indicating that they were coeval with their counterparts from the Thuringian Forest Basin (Germany) and that the Variscan belt was not a barrier to their dispersal during the early Permian.
- Natural casts of burrows that were possibly produced by small tetrapods are described from the Permian (Asselian) Słupiec Formation (Poland) by Sadlok (2025).
- Andrade-Silva & Francischini (2025) identify tetrapod footprints belonging to the ichnospecies Batrachichnus salamandroides and Procolophonichnium nopcsai in the strata of the Rio do Rasto Formation (Brazil), extending the temporal range of the studied ichnotaxa into the Wuchiapingian.
- Evidence of preservation of plant and animal remains, bacteria, fungi and probable cestode eggs within coprolites from the Rio do Rasto Formation is presented by Catafesta et al. (2025).
- Wang et al. (2025) study the evolution of shell morphology of brachiopods and forams across the Permian–Triassic extinction event and of forams across the Toarcian Oceanic Anoxic Event, and report evidence of morphological changes reducing the energetic costs of shell calcification, likely in response to environmental pressures.
- A new seabed assemblage preserving fossils of filamentous cyanobacteria, calcareous plankton and marine animals living less than 1 million years after the Permian–Triassic extinction event is described from the Feixianguan Formation (China) by Qiao et al. (2025), providing evidence of early recovery of marine ecosystems after the end-Permian extinction, and possible evidence that microbial mounds created hospitable environments for animals in the Early Triassic seas.
- Evidence from the study of animal and plant fossils from the Lower Triassic Heshanggou Formation (China), indicative of the presence of a diverse riparian ecosystem 2 million years after the Permian–Triassic extinction event, is presented by Guo et al. (2025).
- A study on vertebrate teeth from the Lower Triassic Vikinghøgda Formation (Norway), providing evidence of presence of a diverse assemblage of ray-finned fishes, temnospondyls and marine reptiles representing nine tooth morphotypes and belonging to at least five different feeding guilds, is published by Scharling et al. (2025).
- Evidence from the study of vertebrate fossils from the Lower Triassic strata from Svalbard (Norway), indicative of a rapid radiation resulting in presence of a complex oceanic ecosystem a few million years after the Permian–Triassic extinction event, is presented by Roberts et al. (2025).
- Review of the fossil record of Triassic terrestrial tetrapods from the Central European Basin is published by Mujal et al. (2025).
- A study on the assemblage of fossil teeth from the Middle Triassic (Anisian) strata from the Montseny area (Spain), providing evidence of presence of capitosaur temnospondyls, procolophonids, archosauromorphs and indeterminate diapsids, is published by Riccetto et al. (2025).
- A footprint-like fossil and plants remains including tree trunks, roots and leaf impressions are reported from the Triassic strata in Saudi Arabia by Aba alkhayl (2025).
- Araujo et al. (2025) study the composition of the Carnian vertebrate assemblage from the Vale do Sol area (Brazil), and reevaluate the biostratigraphy of the Hyperodapedon Assemblage Zone.
- New tetrapod fossil assemblage, including rhynchosaur, lagerpetid, sauropodomorph and cynodont fossil material, is described from the Carnian strata from the lower exposures of the Niemeyer Complex (Brazil) by Doering et al. (2025).
- Evidence of similarity of processes of reef rubble consolidation and regeneration observed in Late Triassic reefs from the Dachstein platform (Austria) and in modern coral reefs is presented by Godbold et al. (2025).
- Volosky et al. (2025) describe a diverse Late Triassic biota from the El Mono Formation (Chile) including plants, arthropods, bivalves, freshwater sharks, and bony fishes.
- Jésus et al. (2025) describe new vertebrate fossil material from the Upper Triassic Ørsted Dal Formation (Greenland), including the first records of a doswelliid and members of the genera Lissodus and Rhomphaiodon from the Upper Triassic strata from Greenland reported to date.
- Alarcón et al. (2025) reconstruct environmental conditions in northwestern Gondwana during the Norian and report new fossil assemblages of plants, clam shrimps and vertebrates from the Bocas and Montebel formations (Colombia), providing evidence of biogeographic affinities with Laurasia.
- Kligman et al. (2025) study the composition the Late Triassic vertebrate assemblage from the Pilot Rock White Layer within the Owl Rock Member of the Chinle Formation at the PFV 393 bonebed (Arizona, United States), preserving evidence of coexistence of members of Triassic vertebrate lineages with members of lineages that diversified after Triassic, including terrestrial stem-turtles and a new pterosaur Eotephradactylus mcintireae.
- A new vertebrate assemblage including fish, rhynchocephalian, phytosaur and pterosaur fossils is described from the Upper Triassic (upper Norian to possibly lower Rhaetian) Arnstadt Formation (Germany) by Numberger-Thuy et al. (2025).
- Evidence from the study of hindlimb biomechanics of extant American alligators and Deinosuchus riograndensis, indicating that adoption of more erect limb postures might have reduced limb bone stresses and facilitated the evolution of larger body sizes in terrestrial tetrapods, is presented by Iijima, Blob & Hutchinson (2025).
- Gordon et al. (2025) use a phylogenetic machine-learning approach to determine the distribution of soft-tissue flippers and aquatic habits in extinct amniotes.
- Stone et al. (2025) compare the composition of Pliensbachian reefs from lagoonal and platform edge settings in the Central High Atlas (Morocco), and identify environmental differences resulting in development of two different reef types.
- Evidence from the study of the fossil record of Early Jurassic brachiopods, gastropods and bivalves from the epicontinental seas of the north-western Tethys Ocean, indicative of a relationship between the thermal suitability of the studied animals and changes of their occupancy in response to climate changes during the Pliensbachian and Toarcian, is presented by Reddin et al. (2025).
- Guo et al. (2025) report that differentiation among the fossil communities of the Middle Jurassic Yanliao Biota was strongly associated with salinity, and link development and extinction of the studied biota to structural alteration of the North China Craton.
- An assemblage of Hauterivian invertebrates including ostracods, brachiopods, bivalves, gastropods and scolecodonts is reported from the seep site of Curnier in the Vocontian Basin (France) by Forel et al. (2025).
- Kubota et al. (2025) report the discovery of a new amber Lagerstätte (the Nakagawa amber) from the Aptian strata of the Yezo Group (Japan), preserving remains of plants, fungi and arthropods.
- Delclòs et al. (2025) report a rich amber deposit from the Napo Province in Ecuador, preserving a diverse arthropod fauna and providing evidence of presence of a humid, resinous forest in northwestern South America during the Early Cretaceous.
- Salvino, Schmiedeler & Shimada (2025) document fossil material of an ecologically diverse vertebrate fauna from the Western Interior Seaway found in the Cenomanian strata of the Graneros Shale (Kansas, United States).
- Shimada et al. (2025) report the discovery of a new, diverse assemblage of marine vertebrates from the Cenomanian strata of the Lincoln Limestone Member of the Greenhorn Limestone (Colorado, United States).
- Johnson, Polcyn & Shimada (2025) revise the composition of the vertebrate assemblage from the Cenomanian Tarrant Formation (Texas, United States).
- Petrizzo et al. (2025) compare the impact of the Cenomanian-Turonian boundary event on different groups of marine biocalcifiers, and report evidence of higher vulnerability of large benthic foraminifera and rudist bivalves compared to other studied groups, likely caused by extremely high and fluctuating sea surface temperature.
- Perea et al. (2025) report the discovery of bioerosion traces on dinosaur bones from the Upper Cretaceous Guichón Formation (Uruguay), interpreted as likely produced by beetles (probably dermestids) and small vertebrate scavengers (possibly multituberculate mammals).
- Nikolov et al. (2025) study the composition of the Late Cretaceous (Santonian-Campanian) vertebrate assemblage and other fossils from the Vrabchov Dol locality (Bulgaria), providing evidence of similarities with the Santonian assemblage from the Iharkút and Ajka localities (Hungary) and with the assemblage from the Hațeg Island (present day Romania).
- Cardia et al. (2025) study the feeding habits and trophic levels of vertebrates from the Upper Cretaceous Bauru Group (Brazil) on the basis of mercury concentration in their bones and tooth enamel.
- A study on the composition of the Campanian biota from the Bozeș Formation (Romania) is published by Trif et al. (2025).
- Dalla Vecchia et al. (2025) report the discovery of a new assemblage of Late Cretaceous (possibly Campanian-Maastrichtian) plants and fishes from the Friuli Carbonate Platform (Italy).
- Evidence of increase of complexity of benthic invertebrate community from the López de Bertodano Formation (Antarctica) over the late Maastrichtian is presented by Khan et al. (2025).
- Talevi, Brezina & Lazo (2025) report evidence of presence of sclerobionts on plesiosaur bones from the López de Bertodano Formation, and document evidence of four stages of ecological succession within the studied fall community.
- Polcyn et al. (2025) review the fossil record of Cretaceous and Paleogene fossil tetrapods from Louisiana, including the fossil record of Cretaceous mosasaurs and the Paleogene mammal Anisonchus fortunatus, and review the record of megaripples imaged from seismic data that were caused by tsunami generated by the Chicxulub impact during the Cretaceous-Paleogene transition.
- Close & Reijenga (2025) study the species–area relationships in North American terrestrial vertebrate assemblages during the Cretaceous-Paleogene transition, and report evidence of a large increase in regional-scale diversity of the studied vertebrates in the earliest Paleogene (primarily driven by the diversification of mammals), resulting in the earliest Paleogene assemblages being regionally homogenized to a lesser degree than the latest Cretaceous ones.
- Guo, Qian & Zhang (2025) study the temporal variation in the body size in amphibians, reptiles, birds and mammals throughout the Cenozoic.
- Agnihotri et al. (2025) reconstruct the composition of the Eocene ecosystem from the Kutch Basin (India) on the basis of palynological and arthropod assemblages from the Umarsar Lignite Mine, reporting evidence of presence of a tropical ecosystem with three distinct floristic communities including plants with both Gondwanan and Laurasian origin, evidence of presence of arthropods belonging to at least 45 families, and evidence of diverse plant-arthropod interactions.
- Zonneveld et al. (2025) study the composition of the marine invertebrate assemblage from the Eocene Tanjung Formation (Indonesia) and its stratigraphic setting, and interpret the studied assemblage as supporting the hypothesis that diverse tropical invertebrate faunas of the modern Indo-Australian region might have originated in the Paleogene.
- Description of bird and squamate tracks from the Eocene Clarno Formation and feliform and ungulate tracks from the Oligocene John Day Formation (John Day Fossil Beds National Monument, Oregon, United States) is published by Bennett, Famoso & Hembree (2025).
- Coprolites likely produced by crustaceans, fish, snakes, pigeon-type birds and small mammals are identified from the Oligocene and Miocene strata from Poland (ranging from deep-marine to terrestrial) by Brachaniec et al. (2025).
- A study on fossils from the paleontological sites near the towns of Beaugency, Tavers and Le Bardon (France) and on their taphonomy is published by Perthuis et al. (2025), who identify the presence of a Miocene vertebrate assemblage, as well as fossils of Ronzotherium romani and Palaeogale minuta that were likely reworked from the Oligocene strata.
- A study on the composition of the assemblage of small vertebrates from the Miocene strata from the Ouarzazate Basin (Morocco) is published by Piñero et al. (2025).
- A diverse assemblage of small vertebrates is described from the Miocene (Turolian) strata from the Csodabogyós Cave (Hungary) by Pazonyi et al. (2025).
- Sánchez-Marco et al. (2025) interpret the early terrestrial fauna from Lanzarote as more likely to have reached the island through Fuerteventura than directly from the African continent, and interpret the circumstances that enabled the movement of terrestrial animals from continental Africa to the Canary Islands as likely ceasing before or during the Early Pliocene.
- Geraads et al. (2025) study the composition of the Pliocene-Pleistocene vertebrate fauna from Lomekwi (Kenya), including possible new species of Lutra and Panthera.
- Revision of the Pleistocene assemblage from the Cumberland Bone Cave (Maryland, United States) and a study on its paleoecology is published by Eshelman et al. (2025).
- Berghuis et al. (2025) describe a vertebrate assemblage from a subsea site in the Madura Strait off the coast of Surabaya, living in the now-submerged part of Sundaland during the Middle Pleistocene, and report differences in the composition of this assemblage compared to the vertebrate assemblage from Ngandong (Java, Indonesia), including evidence of survival of Duboisia santeng, Epileptobos groeneveldtii and Axis lydekkeri in Java until the end of the Middle Pleistocene; Berghuis et al. (2025) study the depositional conditions and age of the fossil-bearing strata of this site, while Berghuis et al. (2025) study the taphonomy of fossils from this site.
- Evidence from the study of bone fragments and ancient DNA from Arne Qvamgrotta (Storsteinhola cave system, northern Norway), indicative of presence of a diverse coastal faunal assemblage during the Marine Isotope Stage 5a that was different from mammoth steppe communities from the Last Glacial Period, is presented by Walker et al. (2025).
- Cocker et al. (2025) study the contents of latest Pleistocene Arctic ground squirrel middens from Yukon (Canada), containing plant and invertebrate remains including the oldest records of Rorippa palustris and a robber fly belonging to the genus Lasiopogon from Yukon, and interpret the contents of the studied middens as indicative of no significant shrub expansion, and likely indicative of persistence of steppe-tundra environments in the studied area to at least 13.680 calibrated years BP.
- Evidence from the study of Quaternary vertebrate fossils from the Sombrero Island, indicative of presence of a more diverse assemblage of land vertebrates on the island than in the present day, is presented by Viñola-Lopez et al. (2025).
- Fernández-Palacios et al. (2025) revise the known record of extinct terrestrial organisms from Macaronesia, and find that at least half of the studied extinctions can be linked to human colonization of the islands.
- Nogué et al. (2025) review studies from the precedings years and methods used in the study of long-term human influences on past ecosystems.
- Lallensack, Leonardi & Falkingham (2025) organized a comprehensive list of 277 terms used in tetrapod trace fossil research.
- Maisch (2025) reevaluates the generic names introduced for preoccupied fossil vertebrate taxa by Oskar Kuhn, and either confirms or reestablishes the validity of the genera Acanthostoma, Astrodon, Ctenosaurus, Hydromeda, Lyrocephalus, Macroscelesaurus, Pachysaurus, Protobatrachus and Undina.
- Evidence from the study of the fossil record of members of 30 animal clades, indicating that the majority of new morphotypes in the studied groups that were distinct enough to be recognized as species-rank lineages originated through cladogenesis (consistent with the core concepts of punctuated equilibrium), is presented by Anderson & Allmon (2025).
- Lorcery et al. (2025) use the Gen3sis eco-evolutionary model to reconstruct past populations and species dynamics across geographic landscapes and their drivers, and compare predictions of the model to the fossil record of terrestrial mammals from the past 125 million years.
- Evidence of the study of evolutionary history of 27 radiations of plants, arthropods and vertebrates, linking diversity dynamics to the vulnerability to extinction and ability to speciate at the species level, is presented by Quintero et al. (2025).

== Other research ==
- Evidence of lengthy co-oxygenation history for the atmosphere and oceans during the past 2.5 billion years, with a 2-billion-years-long transitional period with fluctuating, generally low atmospheric partial pressure of O_{2}, and interpreted as likely explanation for the protracted rise of complex life, is presented by Wang et al. (2025).
- Galili et al. (2025) reconstruct marine dissolved organic carbon signals since the late Paleoproterozoic, and report evidence of near-modern dissolved organic carbon concentrations in the Paleoproterozoic, their decrease in the Neoproterozoic and subsequent rise in the Cambrian, interpreted as connected to changes of ocean oxygenation and evolution of complex organisms from single-celled ancestors.
- Review of the Earth system processes and their impact on the evolution of life during the "Boring Billion" is published by Mukherjee et al. (2025).
- Park et al. (2025) reconstruct atmospheric concentrations of oxygen and carbon dioxide during the Mesoproterozoic on the basis of the study of primary fluid inclusions in 1.4-billion-years-old surficial halite, and report evidence of moderate climate and oxygen concentrations sufficient for early animal respiration.
- Mayo de la Iglesia et al. (2025) study the decay of algae and cyanobacteria under controlled experimental conditions, and report that the decay of algae resulted in compressed cellular masses that superficially resembled nuclei, providing a new comparative framework that can be used in interpretation fossils of possible early eukaryotes.
- Evidence from the study of Statherian strata from the southern margin of the North China Craton, interpreted as indicating that expansion of Statherian eukaryotes into non-marine settings was limited because these habitats were depleted in fixed nitrogen, is presented by Ma et al. (2025).
- Evidence of a link between marine iodine cycle and stability of the ozone layer throughout Earth's history, resulting in an unstable ozone layer until approximately 500 million years ago that might have restricted complex life to the ocean prior to its stabilization, is presented by Liu et al. (2025).
- Evidence of slow accumulation of Australian sediments preserving Archean mudrocks with high organic content is presented by Lotem et al. (2025), who interpret their findings as consistent with lower primary productivity in Archean than in present times.
- Lee, Xu & Xiao (2025) report evidence indicating that apatite nanocrystals replicating embryo-like microfossils from the Ediacaran Doushantuo Formation (China) are surrounded by a thin coating of amorphous silica covering, interpreted as the cause of exceptional preservation of the studied fossils.
- Evidence of impact of authigenic clay mineralization on Ediacara-style fossilization in fossil assemblages from Newfoundland and northwestern Canada is presented by Tarhan, Boag & Kalderon-Asael (2025).
- Gougeon et al. (2025) revise the sedimentology of the Ediacaran–Cambrian Chapel Island Formation (Newfoundland, Canada) and the composition of the trace fossil assemblage from the studied formation.
- Tarhan et al. (2025) study the fossil record of changes of burrowing depth and sedimentary layers in marine sediments throughout the Phanerozoic, and report evidence of protracted development of the sediment mixed layer, as well as evidence that deep burrowing was established as early as the Cambrian, when the underlying transition layer was established, but also evidence that no significant deepening of this layer happened until the Mesozoic.
- Evidence interpreted as indicative of a link between global tectonic processes, biogeochemical cycling in the ocean and a 60 million-year cyclic fluctuation in marine faunal diversity and extinction throughout the Phanerozoic is presented by Boulila et al. (2025).
- Evidence from the study of molybdenum and uranium concentrations in the strata of the Cambrian Alum Shale Formation (Denmark), indicative of occurrence of bottom water oxygenation events coinciding with animal diversifications, is presented by Zhao et al. (2025).
- Liu et al. (2025) study changes of redox structure of the early Cambrian oceans as indicated by geochemical data from sedimentary facies in South China, and report evidence of impact of redox variations on changes of diversity of organisms.
- Farrell et al. (2025) present a global Furongian time scale, date Furongian as beginning approximately 494,5 million years ago and ending approximately 487,3 million years ago, and interpret the Steptoean positive carbon isotope excursion as lasting approximately 2,6 million years.
- Retallack (2025) interprets different parts of the Tumblagooda Sandstone (Australia) as ranging in age from the Cambrian to the Devonian.
- Xu et al. (2025) study the origin and evolution of microcrystalline quartz from Late Ordovician and Early Silurian marine mudstones from the Yangtze Block in the South China Craton, and argue that Early Silurian cooling might have been driven by formation of microcrystalline quartz which in turn resulted from recovery of siliceous organisms after the Late Ordovician mass extinction.
- Ferretti et al. (2025) analyze the preservation of three-dimensional ferruginous skeletal replicas of Silurian invertebrates from the Rio Tamer area of the Carnic Alps (Italy).
- Cowen et al. (2025) study the geochemistry of dental tissue of Devonian fish fossils from Svalbard (Norway) and Cretaceous lungfish and plesiosaur fossils from Australia, and interpret their findings as indicative of preservation of the primary chemical composition of the bioapatite in the studied fossils.
- Bubphamanee et al. (2025) reconstruct the history of deep-ocean oxygenation throughout the Paleozoic, and find no evidence of permanent deep-ocean oxygenation until the middle Devonian, coinciding with radiation of epifauna and infauna in deeper oceanic habitats.
- Evidence from the study of Devonian-Carboniferous boundary sections in Canada and China, interpreted as indicative of occurrence of photic zone euxinia linked to extinctions of marine organisms during the Hangenberg event, is presented by Wang et al. (2025).
- Zhang et al. (2025) link the initiation of the late Paleozoic icehouse to enhanced organic carbon burial and oceanic anoxia resulting from changes in the biological pump in early Mississippian oceans.
- Schiffbauer et al. (2025) study the ecology of biotas from the Carboniferous Mazon Creek fossil beds (Illinois, United States), and corroborate the distinction of the two marine Essex assemblages and the nearshore Braidwood assemblage.
- Mann et al. (2025) study the depositional setting of the lost vertebrate deposit southwest of the Danville city (Illinois, United States), preserving some of the oldest known diadectomorph and captorhinid fossils reported to date, and assign the fossil assemblage from the studied site to the Inglefield Sandstone Member below the Macoupin Limestone Member of the Patoka Formation (Kasimovian, Carboniferous).
- Liu et al. (2025) link the climate warming happening during the Capitanian mass extinction event to the release of the magmatic methane in the Emeishan Large Igneous Province.
- Evidence from the study of paleotropical peatland drill core from southwest China, indicating that disruptions of carbon and sulfur cycles during the Permian–Triassic transition were more likely related to regional deforestation and its cascading effects such as intensified weathering and sulfate release rather than to a single, global volcanic driver, is presented by Chen et al. (2025).
- A study on bioturbation in sediments from the Permian–Triassic transition from Svalbard (Norway) and on their geochemistry is published by Beaty et al. (2025), who argue that recovery of bioturbators in benthic ecosystems influenced sediment chemistry and promoted restoration of efficient carbon and sulfur cycling in the aftermath of the Permian–Triassic extinction event.
- Dai et al. (2025) provide a high-resolution age model for the Early Triassic on the basis of dating of ash beds from South China, and present new age estimates for Permian–Triassic, Griesbachian–Dienerian, Induan–Olenekian, Smithian–Spathian and Olenekian–Anisian boundaries.
- Evidence from the study of fossils of the Early Triassic Paris biota, indicative of existence of clade-specific geochemical signatures in the studied fossils that might aid identification of undetermined specimens from the Paris Biota, is presented by Smith et al. (2025).
- Evidence from the study of polyaromatic hydrocarbons from the Olenekian strata from Spitsbergen (Norway), interpreted as indicative of links between an increase in wildfire activity and changes in vegetation and precipitation during the Early Triassic, as well as between wildfire activity and long-term carbon sequestration at that time, is presented by Blattmann et al. (2025).
- Haldar, Ray & Bandyopadhyay (2025) revise the biostratigraphy of the upper Triassic horizons of India, and identify a single Upper Maleri-Lower Dharmaram Assemblage Eubiozone of mid-to-late Norian age.
- Evidence from the study of boron isotope data from fossil oysters from the Lavernock Point (Wales, United Kingdom), indicative of ocean acidification from volcanic outgassing during the Triassic–Jurassic transition, is presented by Trudgill et al. (2025).
- Numberger-Thuy et al. (2025) study the stratigraphy of previously undocumented succession of Rhaetian to Hettangian strata near the town of Irrel (Rhineland-Palatinate, Germany), and report the presence of a fossil assemblage including palynomorphs, molluscs, ostracods, echinoderms and vertebrates.
- Evidence from the study of fossil chlorophyll derivatives from the Lower Jurassic Toyora Group (Japan), indicative of increase in marine primary productivity in the northwest of the Panthalassa Ocean during the recovery from the Toarcian Oceanic Anoxic Event, is presented by Kawabata et al. (2025).
- A study on calcareous nannofossils from the level of the Los Molles Formation (Argentina) preserving fossils of Maresaurus coccai, Chacaicosaurus cayi and Mollesaurus periallus is published by Chaumeil Rodríguez et al. (2025), who interpret the studied nannofossils as indicative of an early Bajocian age and possibly indicative of a shallowing event in the Neuquén Basin, and link the abundance of Watznaueria britannica to a turnover of calcareous nannoplankton in the late Aalenian and a subsequent diversification of Watznaueria.
- Varejão et al. (2025) link exceptional preservation of fossils from the Lower Cretaceous Barbalha, Crato, Ipubi and Romualdo formations (Brazil) to environmental conditions resulting from short-term marine incursions into continental settings, caused by separation of Africa and South America and opening of the southern Atlantic Ocean.
- Zhong et al. (2025) provide new, high-precision dating of the Jiufotang Formation (China), and constrain the late phase of the Jehol Biota to the interval from approximately 124 to 121 million years ago.
- Evidence indicating that the volcanic activity that formed the Ontong Java Nui basaltic plateau complex was synchronous with the Selli Event is presented by Matsumoto et al. (2025).
- Harrison et al. (2025) provide evidence indicating that the biological function of giant magnetofossils might have been related to the ability of mobile marine organisms to detect variations in direction and intensity of Earth's magnetic field.
- Tucker et al. (2025) determine the ages of dinosaurs eggs from the Cretaceous strata of the Mussentuchit Member of the Cedar Mountain Formation (Utah, United States) and from the Teel Ulaan Chaltsai locality in the Eastern Gobi Basin (Mongolia) on the basis of U-Pb calcite dating and elemental mapping of eggshells, and interpret their findings as indicative of utility of eggshell biocalcite from eggs of dinosaurs and other egg-laying vertebrates as a geochronometer in Mesozoic and Cenozoic terrestrial sedimentary basins.
- Tucker et al. (2025) revise the sedimentology and stratigraphy of the Bayanshiree Formation (Mongolia), and interpret the studied formation as preserving evidence of aridification in eastern Asia that began during the later phases of the Cenomanian–Turonian transition.
- Albert et al. (2025) provide new information on the Cretaceous Densuș-Ciula Formation (Romania), reporting evidence indicating that the lower part of the formation covers part of the Campanian, and evidence indicating that the shift from marine to continental deposition recorded in the formation happened by middle late Campanian.
- Botfalvai et al. (2025) report evidence from the study of the K2 site from the Densuș-Ciula Formation interpreted as indicating that the studied site represents the oldest known vertebrate site within the Haţeg area, as well as indicating that faunas from the Hațeg Island were stable on a large scale during the Maastrichtian.
- Goonetilleke, Silva & Durkin (2025) interpret carbon isotope composition of fossil organic matter from the Dinosaur Park Formation (Alberta, Canada) as reflecting the Late Campanian Event, providing evidence that part of the Dinosaur Park Formation was deposited during this event, as well as evidence that Campanian carbon cycle perturbations are preserved not only in marine environments but also in terrestrial ones.
- Evidence of a link between large-scale Deccan Traps volcanism and global changes in climate near the end of the Cretaceous is presented by Westerhold et al. (2025).
- A study on the timing of the late Maastrichtian flood basalt volcanism in the Deccan Volcanic Province is published by Kale et al. (2025), who interpret Deccan volcanism as the dominant contributor to the environmental crisis resulting in the Cretaceous–Paleogene extinction event.
- Rodiouchkina et al. (2025) report evidence interpreted as indicating that the amount of sulfur released by Chicxulub impact was approximately 5 times lower than inferred from previous estimates, resulting in milder impact winter scenario during the Cretaceous-Paleogene transition.
- Weaver et al. (2025) link the widespread facies shifts in western North America during the Cretaceous–Paleogene transition to the Cretaceous–Paleogene extinction event, arguing that non-avian dinosaurs likely promoted open habitats and that their extinction might have resulted in widespread emergence of dense forest cover.
- Bai et al. (2025) study the lithostratigraphy and biostratigraphy of the Eocene fossil assemblage from the deposits of the Bayan Obo and Jhama Obo sections in the Shara Murun region (Inner Mongolia, China), correlate them with other Paleogene sections from the Erlian Basin, and propose the subdivision of the Ulangochuian Asian land mammal age.
- Lechner & Böhme (2025) revise the stratigraphy and taphonomy of fossils from the Hammerschmiede clay pit (Germany).
- New information on the chronology of the Miocene fossil sites from central Anatolia (Turkey) is provided by Tholt et al. (2025).
- Djokic et al. (2025) study the mode of preservation of fossils from the McGraths Flat Lagerstätte, and argue that fossil sites with similar fossil preservation might be present worldwide.
- Freitas-Oliveira et al. (2025) publish a systematic review of the scientific literature on the causes and course of the Great American Interchange.
- Duval et al. (2025) provide an age estimate of approximately 2.7 million years for the Guefaït-4 fossil locality (Morocco).
- A study on the composition of the Early Pleistocene biotic assemblage from the Dursunlu Lignite Quarry (Turkey), interpreted as indicative of presence of a shallow lake and palustrine vegetation surrounded by steppe areas, is published by Luján et al. (2025).
- Samim et al. (2025) determine distinct geochronological ages for the Lower, Middle and Upper Nariokotome tuffs (Turkana Basin, Kenya), improving age constraints for archaeological sites within the Nachukui Formation.
- A systematic review of the scientific literature on the late Quaternary megafauna extinction since the 1950s is published by Stewart et al. (2025).
- Evidence from the study that re-sampled a dataset of modern marine skeletonized invertebrates, indicating that reconstructions of changes of Phanerozoic diversity based on the fossil record are significantly impacted by spatial distribution of fossil samples, is presented by Phillipi, Czekanski-Moir & Ivany (2025).
- Evidence from the study of extant benthic invertebrate communities and their death assemblages accumulating on the sea-floor from the Onslow Bay (North Carolina, United States), indicative of high functional fidelity between the entire extant assemblages and predicted assemblages consisting of species with a known fossil record, is presented by Tyler & Kowalewski (2025).
- Matamala-Pagès et al. (2025) quantify loss of fossil information across different climate zones on the basis of the study of the Cenozoic fossil record, find that 72 % of past climate zone areas lack accessible, fossil-bearing sedimentary rocks, and find that disproportionally large part of the fossil record originates from past temperate environments.
- Richter, Meade & Pickles (2025) present a protocol aiding the identification of fragmented fossil remains using geometric morphometric analysis, and test its accuracy on remains of extant lizards from the Pacific Northwest of the United States.
- Oses et al. (2025) demonstrate the utility of imaging and spectroscopy techniques in the study of fossilisation processes and morphological features of Corumbella werneri from the Ediacaran Tamengo Formation and insect fossils from the Cretaceous Crato Formation (Brazil).
- Lindahl et al. (2025) review the utility of paleogenomics for the studies of biodiversity trends throughout the Quaternary.
- Fagernäs et al. (2025) study the effects of artificial contamination of a tooth of a Pleistocene woolly rhinoceros to determine the impact of modern protein contamination on preservation of original proteome in fossil tooth enamel, and compare the utility of different decontamination methods.
- Oertle et al. (2025) provide evidence that zooarchaeology by mass spectrometry can be undertaken on Late Pleistocene to early Holocene animal remains from tropical environments of New Guinea.
- Bromage et al. (2025) study the biology and environment of mammals from Plio-Pleistocene localities in Olduvai Gorge (Tanzania), Chiwondo Beds (Malawi) and Makapansgat (South Africa) on the basis of metabolomes recovered from their remains.
- Doiron et al. (2025) report evidence indicating that early Pleistocene hominins from Olduvai Gorge lived in environment with stable proportions of C_{3} and C_{4} plants throughout wetter and drier period, and with changing lake chemistry through time, including increased lake alkalinity during drier intervals.
- A new integrative script for TNT which can be used to analyze the phylogenetic placement of fossil taxa on a reference tree is presented by Catalano et al. (2025).
- Mulvey et al. (2025) review the use of the fossilized birth–death models in the phylogenetic analyses incorporating fossil taxa.
- Nikolic, Warnock & Hopkins (2025) evaluate the utility of inclusion of both fossils with morphological data and ones only with taxonomic constraints and data on age but without morphological data in the analyses aiming to recover dated phylogeny of extinct taxa, testing their combined approach on trilobites from the group Aulacopleurida, and argue that a combined analysis outperforms analyses that only include taxa scored into a morphological matrix.
- Wright & Hopkins (2025) experiment with a morphological dataset of olenid trilobites to determine impact of assumptions about morphological evolution reflected in different character model configurations on phylogenetic analyses based on fossil data and on inferences about macroevolution derived from those analyses.
- Parins-Fukuchi (2025) presents a new probabilistic model that can be used in the studies of the origin and loss of polymorphic variants of morphological traits within a species and their sorting during speciation, and uses this model to study the evolution of the Cretaceous sea urchin genus Micraster, providing evidence of loss of variation in later species compared to their ancestors.
- Wang & Zhang (2025) present a new model for analysis of continuous trait evolution in the phylogenetic studies using the software MrBayes, and apply it to the datasets from the phylogenetic study of pterosaurs published by Andres (2021) and the phylogenetic study of hominins published by Ni et al. (2021) to demonstrate that continuous traits can contain more phylogenetic information than discrete traits evolved at the same rate.
- Evidence of impact of taxon sampling on results of studies of phylogenetic relationships of early amniotes is presented by Jenkins, Meyer & Bhullar (2025).
- Howard et al. (2025) introduce a new workflow for integration of fossil occurrences, extant species occurrences, phylogenetic trees and paleoclimate reconstructions to determine climatic niches of the studied species throughout their evolutionary history.
- Evidence from the study of extant tetrapods and non-avian dinosaurs, indicative of a link between mass distribution and robusticity of the humeral shaft relative to the femoral shaft which can be used to determine mass distribution in fossil tetrapods, is presented by Dempsey et al. (2025).
- Wang et al. (2025) demonstrate the utility of blender modeling techniques in restoration of morphology (including damaged body parts) of amber-encased specimens, using a specimen of a soldier beetle Sanaugulus sp. from the Cretaceous amber from Myanmar as an example.
- Smith et al. (2025) provide a list of priority questions in the paleontological research identified by scientists from more than 30 countries participating in the Big Questions community initiative.
- Castillo Brache (2025) proposes diagnostic criteria for parachute science in paleontology and discusses harm caused by such practices on the basis of the case of acquisition and study of the fossil material of Irritator challengeri as an example.
- Macário et al. (2025) revise the fossil record of invertebrates from the Araripe Basin (Brazil), repository data of their fossils and patterns of the authorships of studies on those fossils, and report that nearly half of analyzed holotypes are held in institutions outside Brazil, studied and described with minimal or no collaboration with Brazilian scientists.
- Rich, Santucci & Tweet (2025) document the contributions of the public works programs of the New Deal to paleontology-focused projects in National Park Service units.

=== Paleoclimate ===
- Evidence from the study of mercury geochemistry and oxygen and strontium isotope composition of conodont bioapatite from Ordovician marine successions at Huanghuachang, Chenjiahe and Wangjiawan (China) and from published global datasets, indicating that episodic climatic cooling from ~470 to 445 million years ago was primarily caused by continental large igneous province volcanism, is presented by Zhao et al. (2025).
- Evidence of low atmospheric CO_{2} levels throughout the main phase of the late Paleozoic icehouse, and of rapid increase in atmospheric CO_{2} between 296 and 291 million years ago, is presented by Jurikova et al. (2025).
- Wu et al. (2025) report evidence of reduction in the transfer efficiency of particulate organic carbon from the surface to the deep ocean during the Permian−Triassic Thermal Maximum, the early Toarcian Thermal Maximum and the Paleocene−Eocene Thermal Maximum that was linked to temperature-dependent changes in microbial metabolism and might have amplified the studied warming events.
- Xu et al. (2025) link prolonged high CO_{2} levels and extreme hothouse climate during the Early Triassic to losses of terrestrial vegetation during the Permian–Triassic extinction event.
- Evidence from the study of mercury isotopes and gamma ray data from the Jiyuan Basin (China), indicative of links betweens successive volcanic pulses of the Wrangellia Large Igneous Province and environmental changes during the Carnian pluvial episode, is presented by Zhang et al. (2025).
- Evidence from the study of fossil logs from the Petrified Forest National Park (Arizona, United States), interpreted as indicating that the Chinle Formation was deposited in a strongly seasonal climate with rainfall that was variable year to year, is presented by Parrish, Gillis & Fairley (2025).
- Qiu et al. (2025) identify a massive release of biogenic methane during the Toarcian Oceanic Anoxic Event as a contributing factor to global surface warming, and link this release to increased methanogenesis and associated decline in methane oxidation within marine environments.
- A study on the climate and environmental changes in the Yanliao region (China) during the Middle Jurassic is published by Hao et al. (2025), who report evidence of a shift from wet to sub-humid conditions during the Bathonian, interpreted by the authors as likely driving the diversification of the Yanliao Biota.
- Lu et al. (2025) report evidence from the study of palynological assemblages and clay mineralogy of the Kazuo Basin (Liaoning, China) indicative of a dry and hot climatic event during the early Aptian, interpreted as likely synchronous with the Selli Event.
- Feng et al. (2025) reconstruct mean Late Jurassic and Late Cretaceous atmospheric pCO_{2} on the basis of the study of oxygen isotope composition of dinosaur tooth enamel, and estimate that Mesozoic gross primary productivity might have been 20 to 120% higher than today.
- Rodríguez-López et al. (2025) present evidence from the study of glaciomarine and subglacial facies from the Uribe Kosta Geosite (Biscay, Spain) indicative of presence of tidewater glaciers grounded in northern Iberia during the Campanian (termed the Barrika glaciation by the authors).
- Evidence from the study of lizard and snake fossils from Eocene localities in Wyoming and North Dakota (United States), interpreted as indicative of warmer and wetter climate in mid-latitude North America during the late Eocene than indicated by earlier studies, is presented by Smith & Bruch (2025), who argue that there is no evidence of exceptionally high climate sensitivity to the atmospheric concentration of CO_{2} during the early Eocene.
- Werner et al. (2025) report evidence indicating that East African uplift and atmospheric CO_{2} changes promoted grassland expansion across East and Central Africa during the Miocene and facilitated shifts in mammalian communities at the time.
- Evidence indicating that climate and geographic changes in the Miocene resulted in vegetation changes that in turn caused climate change feedbacks that impacted cooling and precipitation changes during the late Miocene climate transition is presented by Zhang et al. (2025).
- Markowska et al. (2025) present evidence of recurrent humid intervals in the arid Arabian interior over the past 8 million years, and argue that those wet episodes might have enabled dispersals of mammals between Africa and Eurasia.
- Evidence from the study of pollen data from the eastern part of the North China Plain, indicative of climate changes in northern China since the late Pliocene that coincided with shift in composition of the mammalian fauna, is presented by Hua et al. (2025).
- Linchamps et al. (2025) reconstruct past climate in the Cradle of Humankind area (South Africa) as indicated by mammalian fossil assemblages, finding no evidence of a progressive shift toward aridification during the past 3.5 million years.
- Sánchez-Bandera et al. (2025) study frog, lizard and snake fossils associated with the Homo aff. erectus specimen ATE7-1 from Sima del Elefante (Spain), and interpret them as indicative of cool and wet climate conditions during the late Early Pleistocene.
- Evidence indicating that abrupt climate changes during the Last Glacial Period increased pyrogenic methane emissions and global wildfire extent is presented by Riddell-Young et al. (2025).
- Matthews et al. (2025) study new palaeoclimatic record from Llangorse (South Wales, United Kingdom) near the earliest British archaeological sites, and find that repopulation of the northwest margin of Europe by humans after the Last Glacial Maximum was supported by local summer warming.
- Geochemical evidence from the study of a speleothem from the Herbstlabyrinth Cave (Germany), interpreted as indicating that the Laacher See eruption was not directly linked to the Younger Dryas cooling in Greenland and Europe, is presented by Warken et al. (2025).
