= 2024 in paleontology =

Paleontology or palaeontology is the study of prehistoric life forms on Earth through the examination of plant and animal fossils. This includes the study of body fossils, tracks (ichnites), burrows, cast-off parts, fossilised feces (coprolites), palynomorphs and chemical residues. Because humans have encountered fossils for millennia, paleontology has a long history both before and after becoming formalized as a science. This article records significant discoveries and events related to paleontology that occurred or were published in the year 2024.

== Flora ==
=== Fungi ===
==== Newly named fungi ====
Name	Novelty	Status	Authors	Age	Type locality	Location	Notes	Images
Asterina siwalika	Sp. nov		Mahato & Khan	Miocene to Pliocene	Chunabati Formation	India	A species of Asterina.	
Harristroma	Gen. et sp. nov		Le Renard et al.	Middle Jurassic	Cloughton Formation	United Kingdom	A member of Ascomycota of uncertain affinities. The type species is H. eboracense.	
Inapertisporites lacrimaformis	Sp. nov	Valid	Martínez, Bianchinotti & Cornou	Paleogene	El Foyel Group	Argentina	Spores of a fungus.	
Marasmiamimum	Gen. et sp. nov		Mao, Guo & Huang in Guo et al.	Cretaceous	Burmese amber	Myanmar	A member of Agaricales of uncertain affinities, a possible member of Marasmiineae. The type species is M. cretaceum.	
Meliolinites miocenicus	Sp. nov		Kundu & Khan	Miocene		India	A member of the family Meliolaceae.	
Meliolinites miopanici	Sp. nov	Valid	Kundu & Khan	Miocene		India	A member of the family Meliolaceae. Announced in 2023; the final version of the article naming it was published in 2024.	
Meliolinites tengchongensis	Sp. nov		Wang et al.	Pliocene	Mangbang Formation	China	A member of the family Meliolaceae.	
Mesoagaracites	Gen. et sp. nov		Guo et al.	Cretaceous	Burmese amber	Myanmar	A member of Agaricales of uncertain affinities, a possible member of Marasmiineae. The type species is M. burmitis.	
Palaeomeliola	Gen. et sp. nov		Kundu & Khan	Miocene		India	A member of the family Meliolaceae. The type species is P. indica.	
Rhizophydites bicornis	Sp. nov	Valid	Krings	Devonian	Rhynie chert	United Kingdom	A member of Chytridiomycota.	
Rhizophydites shutei	Sp. nov	Valid	Krings	Devonian	Rhynie chert	United Kingdom	A member of Chytridiomycota.	
Tungusia	Gen. et sp. nov		Kolosov & Okhlopkova	Ediacaran	Byuk Formation	Russia (Sakha Republic)	A fungus of uncertain affinities. The type species is T. mane.	
Zygosporium himachalensis	Sp. nov	Valid	Kundu & Khan	Miocene		India	A member of Xylariales belonging to the family Zygosporiaceae.	
Zygosporium palaeogibbum	Sp. nov		Mahato et al.	Miocene	Chunabati Formation	India	A member of Xylariales belonging to the family Zygosporiaceae.	
Zygosporium stromaticum	Sp. nov		Kundu & Khan	Miocene		India	A member of Xylariales belonging to the family Zygosporiaceae.	

==== Mycological research ====
- Garcia Cabrera & Krings (2024) describe fungi colonizing bulbils of Palaeonitella cranii from the Devonian Rhynie chert, interpreted as distinct from fungi colonizing the axes and branchlets of P. cranii, which might indicate organ-specific colonization.

== Cnidarians ==
=== New taxa ===
Name	Novelty	Status	Authors	Age	Type locality	Country	Notes	Images
Bothrophyllum crassiseptatum	Sp. nov	Valid	Luo et al.	Carboniferous	Shiqiantan Formation	China	A rugose coral belonging to the group Stauriida and the family Bothrophyllidae.	
Bothrophyllum junggarense	Sp. nov	Valid	Luo et al.	Carboniferous	Shiqiantan Formation	China	A rugose coral belonging to the group Stauriida and the family Bothrophyllidae.	
Caninophyllum pseudotimaniforme	Sp. nov	Valid	Luo et al.	Carboniferous	Shiqiantan Formation	China	A rugose coral belonging to the group Stauriida and the family Cyathopsidae.	
Cladochonus fukushimaensis	Sp. nov	Valid	Niko	Permian	Takakurayama Formation	Japan	A tabulate coral.	
Cyphastrea katsutaensis	Sp. nov	Valid	Niko & Suzuki	Miocene	Katsuta Group	Japan	A species of Cyphastrea.	
Heliolites imoensis	Sp. nov	Valid	Niko	Silurian	Imose Limestone	Japan	A tabulate coral.	
Hexangulaconularia amylofacialis	Sp. nov		Liu et al.	Cambrian (Fortunian)	Kuanchuanpu Formation	China	A medusozoan belonging to the possible conulatan family Hexangulaconulariidae.	
?Holoconularia poletaevi	Sp. nov	Valid	Ohar & Dernov	Carboniferous (Moscovian)	Almazna Formation	Ukraine	A member of Conulariida.	
Ipciphyllum dilatum	Sp. nov	Valid	Aung Myo Zaw & Aye Ko Aung	Permian	Thitsipin Limestone	Myanmar	A rugose coral belonging to the group Metriophyllina and the family Waagenophyllidae.	
Kanashiropora okuboi	Sp. nov	Valid	Niko	Devonian	Ohno Formation	Japan	A tabulate coral belonging to the group Auloporida and the family Palaeofavosiporidae.	
Kuhnastraea rara	Sp. nov	Valid	Punina	Late Triassic		Russia (Primorsky Krai)	A stony coral.	
Lindaphylon	Gen. et sp. nov		Rozhnov	Ordovician		Estonia	A colonial coral. The type species is L. solovjevi.	
Mamsetia	Gen. et sp. nov		McIlroy et al.	Ediacaran	Trepassey Formation	Canada (Newfoundland and Labrador)	A staurozoan. The type species is M. manunis.	
Monophyllum maxima	Sp. nov	Valid	El-Desouky	Carboniferous (Kasimovian)	Aheimer Formation	Egypt	A rugose coral belonging to the group Stauriida and the family Antiphyllidae.	
Mucophyllum toomae	Sp. nov	Valid	Kazantseva in Kazantseva, Koromyslova & Krutykh	Silurian	Kuressaare Formation	Estonia	A rugose coral.	
Pachyfavosites hikoroichiensis	Sp. nov	Valid	Niko	Devonian	Ohno Formation	Japan	A tabulate coral belonging to the group Favositida and the family Favositidae.	
Paraconularia ihatovensis	Sp. nov	Valid	Niko	Devonian	Tobigamori Formation	Japan	A member of Conulariida.	
Paraconularia lata	Sp. nov	Valid	Ohar & Dernov	Carboniferous (Moscovian)	Almazna Formation	Russia (Bashkortostan); Ukraine	A member of Conulariida.	
Sociophyllum koenigshofi	Sp. nov	Valid	Denayer	Devonian	Couvin Formation	Belgium	A rugose coral.	
Squameostriatopora tachibanai	Sp. nov	Valid	Niko	Devonian	Ohno Formation	Japan	A tabulate coral belonging to the group Favositida and the family Pachyporidae.	
Sutherlandia gzheliensis	Sp. nov	Valid	Krutykh, Mirantsev & Rozhnov	Carboniferous (Gzhelian)	Moscow Syneclise	Russia	A favositid coral. Published online in 2025, but the issue date is listed as December 2024.	
Syringopora sanrikuensis	Sp. nov	Valid	Niko	Devonian	Ohno Formation	Japan	A tabulate coral belonging to the group Auloporida and the family Syringoporidae.	
Thamnopora ohnoensis	Sp. nov	Valid	Niko	Devonian	Ohno Formation	Japan	A tabulate coral belonging to the group Favositida and the family Pachyporidae.	
Xenoemmonsia onukii	Sp. nov	Valid	Niko	Devonian	Nakazato Formation	Japan	A tabulate coral.	
Yuanophylloides molestus	Sp. nov		Fedorowski & Chwieduk	Carboniferous	Gaptank Formation	United States (Texas)	A rugose coral belonging to the group Stauriida and the family Neokoninckophyllidae.	
Yuanophylloides parcus	Sp. nov		Fedorowski & Chwieduk	Carboniferous	Gaptank Formation	United States (Texas)	A rugose coral belonging to the group Stauriida and the family Neokoninckophyllidae.	

=== Cnidarian research ===
- Yong et al. (2024) report evidence of presence of a thin, transverse wall spanning the internal thecal cavity of specimens of Olivooides mirabilis and O. multisulcatus from the Cambrian Kuanchuanpu Formation (Shaanxi, China), representing the earliest known transverse exoskeletal element in cnidarians reported to date.
- A study on the phylogenetic relationships of Hexangulaconulariidae, based on data from new specimens from the Cambrian strata from the Yangtze Platform (China), is published by Song et al. (2024), who interpret hexangulaconulariids as members of the stem group of Medusozoa related to carinachitids, conulariids and olivooids.
- Bruthansová et al. (2024) study a sample of specimens of Conularia fragilis from the Devonian (Pragian) Koněprusy Limestone (Czech Republic), and interpret the bending of the studied specimens as occurring while the studied conulariids were alive.
- A study on coral samples from Givetian reefs, providing evidence of Devonian tabulate and rugose corals hosting active photosymbionts that likely supported coral productivity under warm climatic conditions, is published by Jung et al. (2024).
- Echevarría et al. (2024) study the development of the Pliensbachian coral reef from the Puesto Araya Formation (Mendoza, Argentina), reporting evidence of dominance of corals with cerioid corallite arrangement in later stages of the development of the reef, unlike other known Early Jurassic reefs.
- A study on the phylogenetic relationships of extant and extinct scleractinians, focusing on the Triassic and Jurassic members of the group, is published by Lathuilière et al. (2024).
- A study on the diversity of corals from the Burdigalian to Langhian Wadi Waqb Member of the Jabal Kibrit Formation (Saudi Arabia) is published by Pisapia et al. (2024), who interpret the composition of the studied assemblages as indicating that young Red Sea had a connection to the Mediterranean Sea, but did not have a direct connection to the Indian Ocean.

== Bryozoans ==
=== New taxa ===
Name	Novelty	Status	Authors	Age	Type locality	Location	Notes	Images
Akatopora oviaviculata	Sp. nov	Valid	Håkansson, Gordon & Taylor	Late Cretaceous (Maastrichtian)	Korojon Formation	Australia	A member of Cheilostomata belonging to the family Antroporidae.	
Aspidostoma enchiridium	Sp. nov	Valid	Håkansson, Gordon & Taylor	Late Cretaceous (Maastrichtian)	Korojon Formation	Australia	A member of the family Aspidostomatidae.	
Aspidostoma duoavicularia	Sp. nov	Valid	Håkansson, Gordon & Taylor	Late Cretaceous (Maastrichtian)	Korojon Formation	Australia	A member of the family Aspidostomatidae.	
Aspidostoma gleddeni	Sp. nov	Valid	Håkansson, Gordon & Taylor	Late Cretaceous (Maastrichtian)	Korojon Formation	Australia	A member of the family Aspidostomatidae.	
Aspidostoma obesum	Sp. nov	Valid	Håkansson, Gordon & Taylor	Late Cretaceous (Maastrichtian)	Korojon Formation	Australia	A member of the family Aspidostomatidae.	
Aspidostoma titan	Sp. nov	Valid	Håkansson, Gordon & Taylor	Late Cretaceous (Maastrichtian)	Korojon Formation	Australia	A member of the family Aspidostomatidae.	
Bubnoffiella? ambigua	Sp. nov	Valid	Håkansson, Gordon & Taylor	Late Cretaceous (Maastrichtian)	Korojon Formation	Australia	Possibly a member of the family Bryocryptellidae.	
Cardabiella	Gen. et sp. nov	Valid	Håkansson, Gordon & Taylor	Late Cretaceous (Maastrichtian)	Korojon Formation	Australia	A member of Cheilostomata belonging to the group Flustrina and the superfamily Microporoidea; the type genus of the new family Cardabiellidae. The type species is C. ovicellata.	
Cheethamia dividia	Sp. nov	Valid	Håkansson, Gordon & Taylor	Late Cretaceous (Maastrichtian)	Korojon Formation	Australia	A member of the family Onychocellidae.	
Cianotremella dimorpha	Sp. nov	Valid	Håkansson, Gordon & Taylor	Late Cretaceous (Maastrichtian)	Korojon Formation	Australia	A member of the family Microporidae.	
Cianotremella pilbara	Sp. nov	Valid	Håkansson, Gordon & Taylor	Late Cretaceous (Maastrichtian)	Korojon Formation	Australia	A member of the family Microporidae.	
Conopeum foliorum	Sp. nov		Taboada, Pagani & Cúneo	Late Cretaceous (Maastrichtian)	Lefipán Formation	Argentina	A species of Conopeum.	
Cryptostomella? aspinosa	Sp. nov	Valid	Håkansson, Gordon & Taylor	Late Cretaceous (Maastrichtian)	Korojon Formation	Australia	A member of the family Lepraliellidae.	
Cryptostomella? giralia	Sp. nov	Valid	Håkansson, Gordon & Taylor	Late Cretaceous (Maastrichtian)	Korojon Formation	Australia	A member of the family Lepraliellidae.	
Dionella dimartinoae	Sp. nov	Valid	Håkansson, Gordon & Taylor	Late Cretaceous (Maastrichtian)	Korojon Formation	Australia	A member of the family Calloporidae.	
Dyoidophragma bigeyae	Sp. nov	Valid	Ernst & Buttler	Devonian (Frasnian)	Ferques Formation	France	A trepostome belonging to the family Stenoporidae.	
Eomacropora	Gen. et sp. nov	Valid	Håkansson, Gordon & Taylor	Late Cretaceous (Maastrichtian)	Korojon Formation	Australia	A member of the family Macroporidae. The type species is E. molesta.	
Filifascigera invenusta	Sp. nov	Valid	Håkansson, Gordon & Taylor	Late Cretaceous (Maastrichtian)	Korojon Formation	Australia	A member of Cyclostomata belonging to the family Frondiporidae.	
Filisinella	Gen. et sp. nov	Valid	Håkansson, Gordon & Taylor	Late Cretaceous (Maastrichtian)	Korojon Formation	Australia	A member of Cheilostomata belonging to the superfamily Microporoidea and the family Pyrisinellidae. The type species is F. tenuiaviculata.	
Haigina	Gen. et sp. nov	Valid	Håkansson, Gordon & Taylor	Late Cretaceous (Maastrichtian)	Korojon Formation	Australia	A member of Cheilostomata of uncertain affinities, with similarities to members of the families Brydonellidae, Peedeesellidae and Romancheinidae. The type species is H. distincta.	
Hemitrypa sinuosa	Sp. nov		Ernst, Suárez Andrés & Wyse Jackson	Devonian		Germany		
Hemitrypa vanessae	Sp. nov		Ernst, Suárez Andrés & Wyse Jackson	Devonian		Germany		
Hemitrypella nodulosa	Sp. nov		Ernst, Suárez Andrés & Wyse Jackson	Devonian		Germany		
Heterothoa	Gen. et sp. nov	Valid	Håkansson, Gordon & Taylor	Late Cretaceous (Maastrichtian)	Korojon Formation	Australia	A member of the family Hippothoidae. The type species is H. repens.	
Idmonea perforata	Sp. nov	Valid	Håkansson, Gordon & Taylor	Late Cretaceous (Maastrichtian)	Korojon Formation	Australia	A species of Idmonea.	
Idmonea perpendiculata	Sp. nov	Valid	Håkansson, Gordon & Taylor	Late Cretaceous (Maastrichtian)	Korojon Formation	Australia	A species of Idmonea.	
Isocardabiella	Gen. et sp. nov	Valid	Håkansson, Gordon & Taylor	Late Cretaceous (Maastrichtian)	Korojon Formation	Australia	A member of the family Cardabiellidae. The type species is I. clavata.	
Kololophos? jenkinsae	Sp. nov	Valid	Håkansson, Gordon & Taylor	Late Cretaceous (Maastrichtian)	Korojon Formation	Australia	A member of the family Lichenoporidae.	
Korojonella	Gen. et sp. nov	Valid	Håkansson, Gordon & Taylor	Late Cretaceous (Maastrichtian)	Korojon Formation	Australia	A member of the family Arachnopusiidae. The type species is K. kenozooidea.	
Melychocella cretacea	Sp. nov	Valid	Håkansson, Gordon & Taylor	Late Cretaceous (Maastrichtian)	Korojon Formation	Australia	A member of the family Aspidostomatidae.	
Microeciella sparsipora	Sp. nov	Valid	Håkansson, Gordon & Taylor	Late Cretaceous (Maastrichtian)	Korojon Formation	Australia	A member of the family Oncousoeciidae.	
Monoceratopora adventitia	Sp. nov	Valid	Håkansson, Gordon & Taylor	Late Cretaceous (Maastrichtian)	Korojon Formation	Australia	A member of the family Cribrilinidae.	
Monoceratopora thraneae	Sp. nov	Valid	Håkansson, Gordon & Taylor	Late Cretaceous (Maastrichtian)	Korojon Formation	Australia	A member of the family Cribrilinidae.	
Monoceratopora transversa	Sp. nov	Valid	Håkansson, Gordon & Taylor	Late Cretaceous (Maastrichtian)	Korojon Formation	Australia	A member of the family Cribrilinidae.	
Nudicella dissidens	Sp. nov	Valid	Håkansson, Gordon & Taylor	Late Cretaceous (Maastrichtian)	Korojon Formation	Australia	A member of the family Onychocellidae.	
Orbignyella moyerokanensis	Sp. nov	Valid	Koromyslova & Dronov	Ordovician (Katian)	Dzheromo Formation	Russia		
Paraechmellina	Gen. et sp. nov	Valid	Håkansson, Gordon & Taylor	Late Cretaceous (Maastrichtian)	Korojon Formation	Australia	A member of the family Onychocellidae. The type species is P. simulata.	
Paraflustrella	Gen. et 2 sp. nov	Valid	Håkansson, Gordon & Taylor	Late Cretaceous (Maastrichtian)	Korojon Formation	Australia	A member of the family Calloporidae. The type species is P. berningi; genus also includes P. lacunosa.	
Parainversiula gordoni	Sp. nov		López-Gappa, Ezcurra & Rust	Miocene (Aquitanian-Burdigalian)	Waitiiti Formation	New Zealand		
Paramphiblestrum	Gen. et 2 sp. nov	Valid	Håkansson, Gordon & Taylor	Late Cretaceous (Maastrichtian)	Korojon Formation	Australia	A member of the family Calloporidae. The type species is P. cardabiense; genus also includes P. secundum.	
Peedeesella mckinneyi	Sp. nov	Valid	Håkansson, Gordon & Taylor	Late Cretaceous (Maastrichtian)	Korojon Formation	Australia	A member of the family Peedeesellidae.	
Platonea sagitta	Sp. nov	Valid	Håkansson, Gordon & Taylor	Late Cretaceous (Maastrichtian)	Korojon Formation	Australia	A member of the family Tubuliporidae.	
Protofoveolaria	Gen. et sp. nov	Valid	Håkansson, Gordon & Taylor	Late Cretaceous (Maastrichtian)	Korojon Formation	Australia	A member of the family Foveolariidae. The type species is P. fortunata.	
Reptofascigera batsoni	Sp. nov	Valid	Håkansson, Gordon & Taylor	Late Cretaceous (Maastrichtian)	Korojon Formation	Australia	A member of Cyclostomata belonging to the family Frondiporidae.	
Rhagasostoma infelix	Sp. nov	Valid	Håkansson, Gordon & Taylor	Late Cretaceous (Maastrichtian)	Korojon Formation	Australia	A member of the family Onychocellidae.	
Stichomicropora australis	Sp. nov	Valid	Håkansson, Gordon & Taylor	Late Cretaceous (Maastrichtian)	Korojon Formation	Australia	A member of the family Monoporellidae.	
Stomatopora lata	Sp. nov	Valid	Håkansson, Gordon & Taylor	Late Cretaceous (Maastrichtian)	Korojon Formation	Australia	A species of Stomatopora.	
Stomatopora longicauda	Sp. nov	Valid	Håkansson, Gordon & Taylor	Late Cretaceous (Maastrichtian)	Korojon Formation	Australia	A species of Stomatopora.	
Taractopora nova	Sp. nov	Valid	Håkansson, Gordon & Taylor	Late Cretaceous (Maastrichtian)	Korojon Formation	Australia	A member of the family Cribrilinidae.	
Tricephalopora crassa	Sp. nov	Valid	Håkansson, Gordon & Taylor	Late Cretaceous (Maastrichtian)	Korojon Formation	Australia	A member of the family Cribrilinidae.	
Voigtopora giraliensis	Sp. nov	Valid	Håkansson, Gordon & Taylor	Late Cretaceous (Maastrichtian)	Korojon Formation	Australia	A member of the family Stomatoporidae.	
Voigtopora magna	Sp. nov	Valid	Håkansson, Gordon & Taylor	Late Cretaceous (Maastrichtian)	Korojon Formation	Australia	A member of the family Stomatoporidae.	
Voigtopora pauciramia	Sp. nov	Valid	Håkansson, Gordon & Taylor	Late Cretaceous (Maastrichtian)	Korojon Formation	Australia	A member of the family Stomatoporidae.	
Wilbertopora grandis	Sp. nov	Valid	Håkansson, Gordon & Taylor	Late Cretaceous (Maastrichtian)	Korojon Formation	Australia	A member of the family Calloporidae.	
Wilbertopora kavazosi	Sp. nov	Valid	Håkansson, Gordon & Taylor	Late Cretaceous (Maastrichtian)	Korojon Formation	Australia	A member of the family Calloporidae.	

=== Bryozoan research ===
- He et al. (2024) describe fossil material of Orbiramus ovalis, O. minus, O. normalis and Nekhorosheviella semisphaerica from the Ordovician Honghuayuan Formation (China), expanding known geographical and stratigraphical range of these taxa and preserving probable evidence of their contribution to the development of Early Ordovician patch reefs.

== Brachiopods ==
=== New taxa ===
Name	Novelty	Status	Authors	Age	Type locality	Location	Notes	Images
Afanasjevispirifer	Gen. et comb. nov	Valid	Baranov & Nikolaev	Devonian (Lochkovian and Pragian)	Solovyikha Limestone	Russia	A member of Spiriferida belonging to the family Delthyrididae and the subfamily Howellellinae. The type species is "Howellella" mercuriformis Kulkov (1963); genus also includes A. propria (Modzalevskaya, 1974).	
Aldanispirifer selennyakhensis	Sp. nov	Valid	Baranov & Nikolaev	Devonian (Pragian)		Russia	A member of Spiriferida belonging to the subfamily Howellellinae.	
Alichovella	Gen. et comb. nov	Valid	Hints	Ordovician (Sandbian)		Estonia; Latvia; Lithuania; Russia	A member of Orthida belonging to the group Enteletoidea and the family Draboviidae. The type species is "Dalmanella" kegelensis Alichova (1953).	
Ancillotoechia bicostata	Sp. nov		Popov et al.	Silurian	Dahaneh-Kalut Formation	Iran		
Anechinotsia	Gen. et comb. nov	Valid	Waterhouse	Permian	Tiverton Formation	Australia	A member of Productida belonging to the family Aulostegidae. The type species is "Taeniothaerus" anotos Briggs (1983).	
Aperispirifer initialis	Sp. nov	Valid	Waterhouse	Permian	Brunel Formation	New Zealand	A member of Spiriferida belonging to the family Neospiriferidae.	
Apurimella	Gen. et sp. nov	Valid	Colmenar, Chacaltana & Gutiérrez-Marco	Ordovician	San José Formation	Peru	A member of Orthida belonging to the group Enteletoidea and the family Draboviidae. The type species is A. santiagoi.	
Borealoides	Gen. et sp. nov	Valid	Jin et al.	Silurian (Rhuddanian)	Odins Fjord Formation	Greenland	A member of Pentamerida belonging to the superfamily Pentameroidea and the family Virgianidae. The type species is B. balderi.	
Brachythyrinella simplicitas	Sp. nov	Valid	Waterhouse	Permian	Beckers Formation	Australia	A member of the family Trigonotretidae.	
Branzodiscus	Gen. et sp. nov	Valid	Mergl	Devonian (Lochkovian)	Lochkov Formation	Czech Republic	A discinid brachiopod. The type species is B. porosus.	
Bronzoria	Gen. et sp. et comb. nov	Valid	Ishizaki & Shiino	Permian to Middle Jurassic	Osawa Formation	Austria; Bosnia and Herzegovina; France; Germany; Japan; Norway; Russia; Slovenia; United Kingdom	A member of the family Discinidae. The type species is B. recta; genus also includes "Orbiculoidea" taskrestensis Dagys in Dagys & Kurushin (1985), "Discinisca" sibirica (Moisseiev, 1947), "Discinisca" bosniaca (Kittl, 1904), "Discinisca" discoides (Schlotheim, 1820), "Discinisca" townshendi (Davidson, 1851), "Discinisca rhaetica (Andreae, 1893), "Discinisca" zapfei Radwański & Summesberger (2001) and "Discinisca" spitsbergensis Biernat (1995).	
Chenshichonetes	Nom. nov	Valid	Gaudin	Carboniferous		Australia; China	A member of the family Rugosochonetidae; a replacement name for Robertsella Chen & Shi (2003).	
Cleiothyridina planus	Sp. nov	Valid	Waterhouse	Permian	Barfield Formation	Australia	A member of Athyridida belonging to the family Athyrididae.	
Craniops brussai	Sp. nov		Benedetto, Lavié & Salas	Silurian (Ludfordian-Pridolian)	Los Espejos Formation	Argentina	A craniopsid brachiopod.	
Craniops speculum	Sp. nov		Benedetto, Lavié & Salas	Silurian (Gorstian)	Los Espejos Formation	Argentina	A craniopsid brachiopod.	
Deloprosopus dawesi	Sp. nov	Valid	Jin et al.	Ordovician (Katian)	Merqujoq Formation	Greenland	A member of Pentamerida belonging to the family Virgianidae.	
Dicoelosia paratenua	Sp. nov	Valid	Gallagher & Harper	Silurian		United Kingdom		
Edriosteges kotlyari	Sp. nov	Valid	Tazawa	Permian (Wuchiapingian and Changhsingian)	Toyoma Formation	Japan; Russia (Primorsky Krai)	A member of Productida belonging to the superfamily Aulostegoidea and the family Echinostegidae.	
Fenyveskutella fallax	Sp. nov	Valid	Vörös	Middle Jurassic (Bajocian)	Tölgyhát Limestone Formation	Hungary	A member of Rhynchonellida belonging to the superfamily Norelloidea and the family Norellidae.	
Fenyveskutella ? paronai	Nom. nov	Valid	Vörös	Middle Jurassic		Hungary; Italy	A member of Rhynchonellida belonging to the superfamily Norelloidea and the family Norellidae; a replacement name for Rhynchonella latifrons Parona (1896).	
Galatirhynchia	Gen. et comb. nov	Valid	Vörös	Middle Jurassic		Hungary; Italy	A member of Rhynchonellida belonging to the superfamily Hemithyrididoidea and the family Cyclothyrididae. The type species is "Rhynchonella" galatensis Di Stefano (1884); genus also includes G. baldaccii (Di Stefano, 1884)	
Gasconsia gigantea	Sp. nov	Valid	Hints & Jiayu	Ordovician (Katian)	Adila Formation	Estonia	A member of the family Trimerellidae.	
Gilcurriella	Gen. et comb. nov	Valid	Waterhouse	Permian	Gilgurry Mudstone	Australia	A member of Spiriferida belonging to the superfamily Ambocoelioidea and the family Ambocoeliidae. The type species is "Attenuatella" multispinosa Waterhouse (1967).	
Glossothyropsis australis	Sp. nov	Valid	Waterhouse	Permian	Peawaddy Formation	Australia	A member of Terebratulida belonging to the family Cryptonellidae.	
Glyptorthis papillosa	Sp. nov	Valid	Jin & Harper	Ordovician (Hirnantian)	Whittaker Formation	Canada (Northwest Territories)	A member of Orthida belonging to the family Glyptorthidae.	
Golestanirhynchus golestanicus	Sp. nov		Baranov, Kebria-Ee Zadeh & Blodgett	Devonian (Famennian)	Khoshyeilagh Formation	Iran	A member of Rhynchonellida.	
Hajagithyris	Gen. et comb. nov	Valid	Vörös	Middle Jurassic		Hungary; Italy; Spain	A member of Terebratulida belonging to the superfamily Loboidothyridoidea and the family Muirwoodellidae. The type species is "Terebratula" fylgia Oppel (1863); genus also includes "Pygope" seguenzae Di Stefano (1887) and possibly "Pygope" mykonionensis Di Stefano (1884) and ?H. alamanni (Di Stefano, 1884).	
Isorthis (Ovalella) clarksoni	Sp. nov	Valid	Gallagher & Harper	Silurian		United Kingdom		
Isorthis (Ovalella) equimulticostellata	Sp. nov		Popov et al.	Silurian	Dahaneh-Kalut Formation	Iran		
Jagoellus	Gen. et comb. nov		Brock, Zhang & Holmer	Cambrian Stage 4	Wirrealpa Limestone	Australia	A member of Obolellata belonging to the family Obolellidae; a new genus for "Obolella" wirrialpensis Etheridge (1905).	
Johnsoniana	Nom. nov	Valid	Poletaev	Carboniferous		Belgium; Russia	A member of Spiriferida belonging to the superfamily Paeckelmanelloidea; a replacement name for Oceania Poletaev (2015).	
Katastrophomena mackenzii	Sp. nov	Valid	Jin & Harper	Ordovician (Hirnantian)	Whittaker Formation	Canada (Northwest Territories)	A member of Strophomenida belonging to the family Strophomenidae.	
Kulumbella heimdali	Sp. nov	Valid	Jin et al.	Silurian (Aeronian)	Odins Fjord Formation	Greenland	A member of Pentamerida belonging to the superfamily Stricklandioidea and the family Kulumbellidae.	
Kyrtatrypa pauli	Sp. nov	Valid	Halamski & Baliński in Halamski, Baliński & Kondas	Devonian (Givetian)	Nieczulice beds	Poland	A member of Atrypida belonging to the family Atrypidae.	
Lacunites punctum	Sp. nov		Candela, Harper & Mergl	Ordovician	Fezouata Formation	Morocco		
Leptaena eska	Sp. nov	Valid	Gallagher & Harper	Silurian		United Kingdom		
Lipanteris enigmosus	Sp. nov	Valid	Waterhouse	Permian	Tiverton Formation	Australia	A member of Productida belonging to the family Aulostegidae.	
Lissatrypa scotica	Sp. nov	Valid	Gallagher & Harper	Silurian		United Kingdom		
Macropleura kuhestanensis	Sp. nov		Popov et al.	Silurian	Dahaneh-Kalut Formation	Iran		
Marginalosia sulcata	Sp. nov	Valid	Waterhouse	Permian	Nemo Formation	New Zealand	A member of Productida belonging to the group Strophalosiidina and the family Echinalosiidae.	
Megalopterorhynchus chanakchiensis giganteus	Ssp. nov		Baranov, Kebria-Ee Zadeh & Blodgett	Devonian (Famennian)	Khoshyeilagh Formation	Iran	A member of Rhynchonellida.	
Nalivkinathyris	Gen. et sp. nov	Valid	Baranov, Kebrie-ee Zade & Blodgett	Devonian (Famennian)	Khoshyeilagh Formation	Iran	A member of the family Athyrididae. The type species is N. damganensis. Published online in 2025, but the issue date is listed as December 2024.	
Nocturnellia ashaninka	Sp. nov	Valid	Colmenar, Chacaltana & Gutiérrez-Marco	Ordovician	San José Formation	Peru	A member of Orthida belonging to the group Enteletoidea and the family Draboviidae.	
Oglupes scotia	Sp. nov	Valid	Gallagher & Harper	Silurian		United Kingdom		
Orbaspina involuta	Sp. nov	Valid	Mergl	Silurian (Sheinwoodian)	Motol Formation	Czech Republic	A siphonotretid brachiopod.	
Orbithele tazagurta	Sp. nov		Candela, Harper & Mergl	Ordovician	Fezouata Formation	Morocco		
Paralinguithyris	Gen. et comb. nov	Valid	Vörös	Middle Jurassic		Hungary; Italy; Spain	A member of Terebratulida belonging to the superfamily Dielasmatoidea and the family Zugmayeriidae. The type species is "Aulacothyris" pygopoides Di Stefano (1884); genus might also include ?P. redii (Di Stefano, 1884), ?P. gemmellaroi (Di Stefano, 1884) and ?P. chydas (Di Stefano, 1884).	
Paropamisorhynchus lytvensis	Sp. nov	Valid	Pakhnevich					
Paterula postsilurica	Sp. nov	Valid	Mergl	Devonian (Lochkovian)	Lochkov Formation	Czech Republic	A paterulid brachiopod.	
Petasmaria sartenaeri	Sp. nov		Baranov, Kebria-Ee Zadeh & Blodgett	Devonian (Famennian)	Khoshyeilagh Formation	Iran	A member of Rhynchonellida.	
Phragmorthis henrylunae	Sp. nov	Valid	Colmenar, Chacaltana & Gutiérrez-Marco	Ordovician	San José Formation	Peru	A member of Orthida belonging to the group Plectorthoidea and the family Phragmorthidae.	
Plicogypa kayseri alaskensis	Ssp. nov		Baranov & Blodgett	Devonian (Pragian)	Soda Creek Limestone	United States (Alaska)	Published online in 2024, but the issue date is listed as December 2023.	
Praethele	Gen. et comb. et sp. nov	Valid	Mergl	Silurian (Sheinwoodian to Ludfordian)	Motol Formation	Czech Republic	A discinid brachiopod. The type species is "Discina" vexata Barrande (1879); genus also includes new species P. postvexata.	
Protathyris amsdeni	Sp. nov		Baranov & Blodgett	Devonian (Pragian)	Soda Creek Limestone	United States (Alaska)	Published online in 2024, but the issue date is listed as December 2023.	
Protathyris golshanensis	Sp. nov		Popov et al.	Silurian	Dahaneh-Kalut Formation	Iran		
Pseudocyrtiopsis areniensis	Sp. nov	Valid	Serobyan, Vinn & Mottequin	Devonian (Famennian)		Armenia		
Pseudodielasma campbelli	Sp. nov	Valid	Waterhouse	Permian	Possibly Muree Formation	Australia	A member of Terebratulida belonging to the family Pseudodielasmatidae.	
Pseudopapodina	Gen. et comb. nov	Valid	Vörös	Middle Jurassic		Hungary; Italy; Spain	A member of Terebratulida belonging to the superfamily Dielasmatoidea and the family Zugmayeriidae. The type species is "Terebratula" laticoxa Oppel (1863); genus might also include "Terebratula" recuperoi Di Stefano (1884).	
Pustuloplica ovulata	Sp. nov	Valid	Waterhouse	Permian		New Zealand	A member of Spiriferida belonging to the superfamily Martinioidea and the family Brachythyridae.	
Rafanoglossa inversa	Sp. nov		Candela, Harper & Mergl	Ordovician	Fezouata Formation	Morocco		
Rarepora	Gen. et sp. nov	Valid	Mergl	Devonian (Lochkovian)	Lochkov Formation	Czech Republic	An obolid brachiopod. The type species is R. tumulamen.	
Rzhonsnitskayaella	Gen. et sp. nov		Baranov & Blodgett	Devonian (Pragian)	Soda Creek Limestone	United States (Alaska)	Genus includes new species R. lata. Published online in 2024, but the issue date is listed as December 2023.	
Schellwienella amazonensis	Sp. nov		Corrêa, Ramos & Rezende	Devonian (Lochkovian)	Manacapuru Formation	Brazil	A member of Orthotetida belonging to the family Pulsiidae.	
Schizotreta elegantia	Sp. nov	Valid	Mergl	Silurian (Sheinwoodian)	Motol Formation	Czech Republic	A discinid brachiopod.	
Skadarirhynchia	Gen. et sp. nov		Radulović, Sandy & Schaaf	Early Jurassic (Pliensbachian)	Seoca Lithiotis Limestone	Montenegro	A member of Rhynchonellida. The type species is S. semicostata.	
Sulciplica pauciplicus	Sp. nov	Valid	Waterhouse	Permian	Snapper Point Formation	Australia	A member of Spiriferida belonging to the family Georginakingiidae.	
Syrella confusa	Sp. nov	Valid	Waterhouse	Permian	Flat Top Formation	Australia	A member of Spiriferidina belonging to the superfamily Syringothyridoidea.	
Taeniothaerus subquadratus quadratus	Ssp. nov	Valid	Waterhouse	Permian	Roses Pride Formation	Australia	A member of Productida belonging to the family Aulostegidae.	
Talyndzhaspirifer	Gen. et sp. et comb. nov	Valid	Baranov & Nikolaev	Devonian		Russia	A member of Spiriferida belonging to the subfamily Howellellinae. The type species is T. latus; genus also includes T. pseudoconcinnus (Nikiforova, 1960) and T. gurjevskensis (Rzhonsnitskaya, 1952).	
Tigillumia calamata	Sp. nov	Valid	Waterhouse	Permian	Hilton Limestone	New Zealand	A member of Spiriferida belonging to the family Ingelarellidae.	
Tigillumia planeria	Sp. nov	Valid	Waterhouse	Permian	South Curra Limestone	Australia	A member of Spiriferida belonging to the family Ingelarellidae.	
Tilabadirhynchus	Gen. 2 sp. nov		Baranov, Kebria-Ee Zadeh & Blodgett	Devonian (Famennian)	Khoshyeilagh Formation	Iran	A member of Rhynchonellida. Genus includes new species T. azadshahrensis and T. qeshlaqensis.	
Tinzoulinorthis	Gen. et comb. nov		Candela, Harper & Mergl	Ordovician	Fezouata Formation	Morocco	The type species is T. fasciata (Havlíček, 1971).	
Tiramnia davidi	Sp. nov	Valid	Poletaev	Carboniferous (Bashkirian)	Smolyanynivka Formation	Ukraine	A member of Spiriferida belonging to the family Martiniidae.	
Tumulosulcus abelensis	Sp. nov	Valid	Waterhouse	Permian		Australia	A member of Spiriferida belonging to the family Ingelarellidae.	
Tumulosulcus mckellari	Sp. nov	Valid	Waterhouse	Permian	Mangarewa Formation	New Zealand	A member of Spiriferida belonging to the family Ingelarellidae.	
Undispiriferoides qujingensis	Sp. nov		Liu et al.	Devonian	Qujing Formation	China	A member of Spiriferida belonging to the family Reticulariidae.	
Virgiana hursti	Sp. nov	Valid	Jin et al.	Silurian (Rhuddanian)	Turesø Formation	Greenland	A member of Pentamerida belonging to the family Virgianidae.	
Wosekella maghribi	Sp. nov		Candela, Harper & Mergl	Ordovician	Fezouata Formation	Morocco		

=== Brachiopod research ===
- Evidence from the study of the fossil record from South China, interpreted as indicative of diverse environmental settings of the Hirnantia brachiopod fauna during the Late Ordovician mass extinction, is presented by Huang & Rong (2024).
- Evidence of a relationship between changes of diversity and geographic distribution of brachiopods during and after the Late Ordovician mass extinction is presented by Shi & Huang (2024), who report evidence of greater vulnerability of endemic brachiopods to the extinction and its aftermath compared to cosmopolitan brachiopods.
- A study on evolution of Terebratulida, Rhynchonellida, Spiriferinida and Athyridida from Permian to Quaternary is published by Guo et al. (2024), who find that after the Permian–Triassic extinction event, in spite of lower taxonomic diversity, brachiopods regained pre-extinction levels of morphological diversity.
- Liang et al. (2024) describe fossil material of Anomaloglossa porca from the Ordovician (Sandbian) Pingliang Formation (China), extending known geographical range of the species from Gondwana and Tarim to North China Platform, and interpret the studied fossils as indicative of an infaunal lifestyle of A. porca.
- A study on muscle scars and the hinge structure of Rafinesquina is published by Dattilo et al. (2024), who find that the studied brachiopod was able to gape widely, which eliminated constraints on its feeding orientation and enabled effective valve clearing.
- Shapiro (2024) describes fossil material of Dzieduszyckia from the Devonian Slaven Chert (Nevada, United States), possibly indicative of the presence of a species distinct from D. sonora in Nevada, and interprets Dzieduszyckia as capable of survival in both seep and non-seep settings, which enabled it be primed for the Famennian biotic crises and give rise to later dimerelloids adapted to living in seep or vent settings.
- Popov (2024) reports the discovery of fossil material of a member of the genus Heterelasma from the Olenekian strata in southern Primorye (Russia), potentially representing evidence that members of this genus survived the Permian–Triassic extinction event.
- Harper & Peck (2024) present evidence of disappearance of large brachiopods from shallow tropical waters after the Jurassic period, interpreted as mainly caused by increase of durophagous predation in these environments.

== Echinoderms ==
=== New taxa ===
Name	Novelty	Status	Authors	Age	Type locality	Location	Notes	Images
Absensoblastus	Gen. et comb. nov	Valid	Bohatý, Macurda & Waters	Devonian (Emsian)	Santa Lucía Formation	Spain	A blastoid belonging to the group Pentremitida and the family Hyperoblastidae. The type species is "Hyperoblastus" batheri Breimer & Dop (1975).	
Altusoblastus	Gen. et comb. et 2 sp. nov	Valid	Bohatý, Macurda & Waters	Devonian (Emsian to Eifelian)	Junkerberg Formation	Germany; Spain	A blastoid belonging to the group Pentremitida and the family Hyperoblastidae. The type species is "Pentatrematites" eifeliensis Roemer (1855); genus also includes Pentremitidea roemeri Etheridge & Carpenter (1886) and Pentremitidea clavata var. schultzei Etheridge & Carpenter (1886; raised to the rank of the species Altusoblastus schultzei), as well as new species A. eremitus and A. palliolatus.	
Arabicodiadema jafariani	Sp. nov		Gholamalian, Kamali & Wood	Cretaceous		Iran	A sea urchin belonging to the family Diadematidae.	
Billaster	Gen. et sp. nov	Valid	Olivero & López Cabrera	Eocene	La Meseta Formation	Antarctica	A goniasterid starfish. Genus includes new species B. blakei.	
Bockeliecrinites	Gen. et comb. nov	Valid	Paul	Ordovician (Sandbian)	Furuberget Formation	Norway	A member of Diploporita belonging to the group Ambulacralia and the family Protocrinitidae. The type species is "Protocrinites" rugatus Bockelie (1984).	
Cheirocystis liexiensis	Sp. nov		Liu et al.	Ordovician	Madaoyu Formation	China	A rhombiferan belonging to the group Dichoporita and the family Cheirocrinidae.	
Componaster	Gen. et sp. nov	Valid	Glass, Blake & Lefebvre	Ordovician (Katian)	Lower Ktaoua Formation	Morocco	A brittle star of uncertain affinities. The type species is C. spurius.	
Copernicrinus	Gen. et sp. nov	Valid	Płachno et al.	Middle Jurassic (Bajocian)	Kérdacha Formation	Algeria	A crinoid belonging to the group Comatulida and the family Thiolliericrinidae. The type species is C. zamori.	
Cortinaster	Gen. et 2 sp. nov		Gale	Late Triassic (Carnian)	San Cassiano Formation	Italy	A starfish belonging to the group Neoasteroidea and the family Trichasteropsidae. The type species is C. papillifera; genus also includes C. zardinii.	
Cyathidium chiampoensis	Sp. nov	Valid	Martinez-Soares et al.	Eocene (Lutetian)		Italy	A crinoid belonging to the family Holopodidae.	
Cyathidium phosphaticola	Sp. nov		Gale & Jagt	Late Cretaceous (Campanian)		France; United Kingdom	A crinoid belonging to the family Holopodidae.	
Dissimiloblastus	Gen. et sp. nov	Valid	Bohatý, Macurda & Waters	Devonian (Eifelian)	Hohenhof Formation	Germany	A blastoid of uncertain affinities. The type species is D. inequalis.	
Euspirocrinus varbolaensis	Sp. nov	Valid	Ausich, Wilson & Toom	Silurian (Rhuddanian)	Varbola Formation	Estonia	A cladid crinoid belonging to the group Cyathoformes.	
Eutaxocrinus striatus	Sp. nov	Valid	Bohatý, Ausich & Becker	Devonian (Frasnian)	Prüm Syncline	Germany	A crinoid.	
Forbesasterias	Gen. et comb. nov	Valid	Fau et al.	Early Jurassic (Pliensbachian)		United Kingdom	A starfish belonging to the group Forcipulatacea. The type species is "Uraster" gaveyi Forbes (1850).	
Freisoblastus	Gen. et sp. nov	Valid	Bohatý, Macurda & Waters	Devonian (Eifelian)	Ahbach Formation	Germany	A blastoid of uncertain affinities. The type species is F. hemisphaericus.	
Gauthieria pumilio	Sp. nov	Valid	Schlüter	Late Cretaceous (Campanian)		Germany	A sea urchin belonging to the family Phymosomatidae.	
Hagdornaster	Gen. et comb. nov		Gale	Middle Triassic		Germany	A starfish belonging to the group Neoasteroidea and the family Trichasteropsidae. The type species is "Trichasteropsis" bieletorum Blake & Hagdorn (2003).	
Hattopsis muradi	Sp. nov		Abdelhamid et al.	Late Cretaceous	Simsima Formation	United Arab Emirates/Oman border region	A sea urchin.	
Holopus fabianii	Sp. nov	Valid	Martinez-Soares et al.	Eocene (Lutetian)		Italy	A species of Holopus.	
Hreggoblastus	Gen. et sp. nov	Valid	Bohatý, Macurda & Waters	Devonian (Emsian)	Aguión Formation	Spain	A blastoid belonging to the group Pentremitida and the family Conuloblastidae. The type species is H. differentialis.	
Hyattechinus stauroporus	Sp. nov	Valid	Pauly & Haude	Devonian (Famennian)	Velbert Formation	Germany	A sea urchin belonging to the family Hyattechinidae.	
Hyattechinus velbertensis	Sp. nov	Valid	Pauly & Haude	Devonian (Famennian)	Velbert Formation	Germany	A sea urchin belonging to the family Hyattechinidae.	
Hyperoblastus ludwigi	Sp. nov	Valid	Bohatý, Macurda & Waters	Devonian	Gerolstein Syncline	Germany	A blastoid belonging to the group Pentremitida and the family Hyperoblastidae.	
Isselicrinus baldoensis	Sp. nov	Valid	Roux et al.	Eocene (Lutetian)		Italy	A crinoid belonging to the group Isocrinida and the family Balanocrinidae.	
Karavankecrinus	Gen. et sp. nov	Valid	Ausich et al.	Permian (Artinskian)	Trogkofel Group	Slovenia	A cladid crinoid belonging to the group Cyathoformes and the family Stachyocrinidae. The type species is K. bedici.	
Kukrusecrinus	Gen. et sp. nov	Valid	Rozhnov	Ordovician (Darriwilian and Sandbian)		Estonia	A crinoid belonging to group Camerata and to the family Colpodecrinidae. The type species is K. stellatus. Published online in 2025, but the issue date is listed as December 2024.	
Lacosteaster	Gen. et comb. nov		Gale & Ward	Miocene		France	A starfish belonging to the family Solasteridae. The type species is L. lauerorum.	
Lepidechinoides fragilis	Sp. nov	Valid	Pauly & Haude	Devonian (Famennian)	Velbert Formation	Germany	A sea urchin belonging to the family Lepidocentridae.	
Lotusoblastus	Gen. et comb. nov	Valid	Bohatý, Macurda & Waters	Devonian (Emsian)	Kaub Formation	Germany	A blastoid of uncertain affinities. The type species is "Pentremitidea" medusa Jaekel (1895).	
Marbleaster	Gen. et comb. nov	Valid	Fau et al.	Middle Jurassic (Bathonian)	Forest Marble Formation	United Kingdom	A starfish belonging to the group Forcipulatacea. The type species is "Uraster" spiniger Wright (1880).	
Melocrinites bialasi	Sp. nov	Valid	Bohatý, Ausich & Becker	Devonian (Frasnian)	Prüm Syncline	Germany	A eucamerate crinoid.	
Micraster ernsti	Sp. nov	Valid	Schlüter	Late Cretaceous (Campanian)		Germany		
Moapacrinus dovjensis	Sp. nov	Valid	Ausich et al.	Permian (Artinskian)	Trogkofel Group	Slovenia	A cladid crinoid belonging to the group Cyathoformes and the family Cromyocrinidae.	
Neoglobator teodorii	Sp. nov	Valid	Vadet & Nicolleau	Paleocene (Thanetian)		France	A member of Echinoneoida belonging to the family Galeritidae.	
Novpyrina	Gen. et comb. et sp. nov	Valid	Vadet & Nicolleau	Cretaceous (Valanginian to Maastrichtian)		Algeria; Belgium; France; Germany; Hungary; Lebanon; Oman; Portugal; Spain; Switzerland; United Kingdom	A member of Echinoneoida. The type species is "Pyrina" ovalis d'Orbigny (1856); genus also includes "Nucleopygus" incisus Desor (1842), "Pyrina" globosa de Loriol (1888), "Pseudopyrina" durandi Peron & Gauthier (1879) and "Pseudopyrina" darderi Lambert (1935), as well as new species N. omani.	
Ophiactis hex	Sp. nov	Valid	Thuy et al.	Late Jurassic (Kimmeridgian)	Nusplingen Limestone	Germany	A species of Ophiactis.	
Ophiolofsson	Gen. et 5 sp. nov	Valid	Thuy et al.	Silurian	Högklint Formation	Sweden	A brittle star. The type species is O. obituary; genus also includes O. joelmciveri, O. immolation, O. archspire and O. hendersonorum.	
Ophiopetagno bonzo	Sp. nov	Valid	Thuy et al.	Silurian (Telychian)	Lower Visby Formation	Sweden	A brittle star.	
Ophiopetagno doro	Sp. nov	Valid	Thuy et al.	Silurian	Eke Formation	Sweden	A brittle star.	
Ophiopetagno kansas	Sp. nov	Valid	Thuy et al.	Silurian	Slite Group	Sweden	A brittle star.	
Ophiotitanos moravica	Sp. nov	Valid	Štorc & Žítt	Early Cretaceous (Hauterivian–Barremian)	?Hradiště Formation	Czech Republic	A brittle star belonging to the group Ophiacanthida.	
Parastachyocrinus sloveniaensis	Sp. nov	Valid	Ausich et al.	Permian (Artinskian)	Trogkofel Group	Slovenia	A cladid crinoid belonging to the group Cyathoformes and the family Stachyocrinidae.	
Parastachyocrinus wanneri	Sp. nov	Valid	Ausich et al.	Permian		Timor	A cladid crinoid belonging to the group Cyathoformes and the family Stachyocrinidae.	
Pentagonopentagonalis (col.) annulus	Sp. nov		Donovan et al.	Silurian (Llandovery)	Mulloch Hill Sandstone Formation	United Kingdom	A crinoid columnal.	
Pentahedronoblastus	Gen. et sp. nov	Valid	Bohatý, Macurda & Waters	Devonian (Eifelian)	Junkerberg Formation	Germany	A blastoid belonging to the group Pentremitida and the family Hyperoblastidae. The type species is P. giesdorfensis.	
Petraster caidramiensis	Sp. nov	Valid	Blake & Lefebvre	Ordovician (Katian)	Lower Ktaoua-Upper Tiouririne formations	Morocco		
Phyllocystis baltica	Sp. nov	Valid	Rozhnov & Anekeeva	Ordovician		Russia	A cornutan.	
Phyllocystis cellularis	Sp. nov	Valid	Rozhnov & Anekeeva	Ordovician		Russia	A cornutan.	
Proechinoneus	Gen. et comb. nov	Valid	Vadet & Nicolleau	Eocene and Oligocene		Italy	A member of Echinoneoida belonging to the family Echinoneidae. The type species is "Echinoneus" balestrai Oppenheim (1863).	
Pycnocrinus mohonkensis	Sp. nov	Valid	Brower, Brett & Feldman	Ordovician (Katian)	Martinsburg Formation	United States (New York)	A glyptocrinid camerate crinoid.	
Pyrina largiprocta	Sp. nov	Valid	Vadet & Nicolleau	Cretaceous-Paleocene (Maastrichtian-Danian)		Kazakhstan	A member of Echinoneoida belonging to the family Galeritidae.	
Semiometra algeriana	Sp. nov	Valid	Salamon et al.			Algeria	A feather star.	
Sinocrinus websteri	Sp. nov	Valid	Ausich et al.	Permian (Artinskian)	Trogkofel Group	Slovenia	A cladid crinoid belonging to the group Cyathoformes and the family Erisocrinidae.	
Soleaaster	Gen. et sp. nov		Gale	Late Triassic (Carnian)	San Cassiano Formation	Italy	A starfish belonging to the group Trichasteropsida. The type species is S. thuyi.	
Striacrinus	Gen. et comb. et sp. nov	Valid	Gale	Late Cretaceous (Turonian)		France; Morocco; United Kingdom	A crinoid belonging to the family Roveacrinidae. The type species is "Drepanocrinus" striatulus Gale (2019); genus also includes "Drepanocrinus" marocensis Gale (2019) and "Roveacrinus" communis Douglas (1908), as well as new species S. ornatus.	
Tetragramma salasi	Sp. nov	Valid	Forner	Early Cretaceous (Aptian)	Forcall Formation	Spain	A sea urchin belonging to the group Phymosomatoida and the family Diplopodiidae.	
Thielechinus	Gen. et sp. nov	Valid	Pauly & Haude	Devonian (Famennian)	Velbert Formation	Germany	A sea urchin belonging to the family Proterocidaridae. The type species is T. multiserialis.	
Velbertechinus	Gen. et 2 sp. nov	Valid	Pauly & Haude	Devonian (Famennian)	Velbert Formation	Germany	A sea urchin belonging to the family Archaeocidaridae. The type species is V. mirabilis; genus might also include V? helios.	
Vyscystis? spinosa	Sp. nov		Wang et al.	Cambrian Stage 4	Mantou Formation	China	A lepidocystid blastozoan.	

=== Research ===
- A review of the early evolution of echinoderms is published by Rahman and Zamora (2024).
- Evidence of increase of diversity of adaptations to different life habits throughout the evolutionary history of Cambrian and Ordovician echinoderms is presented by Novack-Gottshall et al. (2024).
- Redescription of Rhombifera bohemica is published by Paul et al. (2024).
- A study on the morphological variation of members of Eublastoidea, and on its implications for the validity of recognized eublastoid subgroups, is published by Anderson & Bauer (2024).
- Evidence from the study of blastoid specimens from the Devonian Hunsrück Slate and from Nümbrecht-Wirtenbach (Germany), interpreted as indicative of the presence of mutable collagenous tissue in the feeding structures of blastoids, is presented by Waters, Bohatý & Macurda (2024).
- A study on the microstructure of the brachiole and the theca ossicles of eocrinoids, as indicated by data from Sinoeocrinus lui from the Cambrian Kaili Formation (China), is published by Yu, Lan & Zhao (2024).
- Bohatý et al. (2024) describe new fossil material of Monstrocrinus from the Devonian strata in Germany, and reinterpret Monstrocrinus as an attached, stalked echinoderm.
- A study on the phylogenetic relationships and morphological diversity of members of Paracrinoidea is published by Limbeck et al. (2024).
- García-Penas et al. (2024) provide evidence of the presence of stalked crinoids belonging to the group Isocrinida in the shallow lagoon environment in northeast Spain during the Aptian, and interpret the absence of extant stalked crinoids from shallow-marine habitats as likely caused by predation pressure.
- The youngest fossil material of shallow-sea stalked crinoids reported to date is described from the middle Miocene shallow nearshore marine facies in Poland by Salamon et al. (2024).
- Thompson & Nebelsick (2024) describe new fossil material of Lepidocentrus eifelianus from the Givetian Ahbach Formation and from the Frasnian Büdersheim Formation (Germany) and fossil material of Rhenechinus hopstaetteri from the Givetian Ahbach Formation, and interpret the studied fossils of R. hopstaetteri as evidence of survival of echinocystitid sea urchins at least to the Middle Devonian.
- Blake (2024) reviews the asterozoan class Stenuroidea, and names new families Hystrigasteridae, Stuertzasteridae, Erinaceasteridae and Ptilonasteridae.

== Hemichordates ==
Name	Novelty	Status	Authors	Age	Type locality	Location	Notes	Images
Calyxdendrum amicabilis	Sp. nov		Gutiérrez-Marco & Maletz	Ordovician (Tremadocian)	Fezouata Formation	Morocco	A graptolite belonging to the family Dendrograptidae.	
Cambrobranchus	Gen. et sp. nov	Disputed	Yang et al.	Cambrian Stage 3	Chiungchussu Formation	China	The type species is C. pelagobenthos. Originally described as an acorn worm; Maletz (2024) contested this identification, arguing that the fossil material of C. pelagobenthos might represent algal remains, a faecal string or a coprolite.	
Sphenoecium marjumensis	Sp. nov		Lerosey-Aubril et al.	Cambrian (Drumian)	Marjum Formation	United States (Utah)	A pterobranch.	
Tarnagraptus cupidus	Sp. nov		Lerosey-Aubril et al.	Cambrian (Drumian)	Marjum Formation	United States (Utah)	A pterobranch.	
Uncinatograptus elsae	Sp. nov	Valid	Lopez et al.	Silurian (Gorstian)	Los Espejos Formation	Argentina	A graptolite belonging to the family Monograptidae.	
Uncinatograptus lisandroi	Sp. nov	Valid	Lopez et al.	Silurian (Gorstian)	Los Espejos Formation	Argentina	A graptolite belonging to the family Monograptidae.	

=== Hemichordate research ===
- Review of the fossil record and evolutionary history of acorn worms and pterobranchs is published by Maletz (2024).
- A study on the locomotion of members of the graptolite genus Demirastrites, providing evidence of rotating locomotory pattern and evolution of morphology in the Demirastrites lineage resulting in increased stability and higher rotation velocity, is published by Shijia, Tan & Wang (2024).
- Maletz & Gutiérrez-Marco (2024) argue that purported rhabdopleurid-like epibionts from the Ordovician Fezouata Formation (Morocco) reported by Nanglu et al. (2023) might be pseudo-colonial tubaria of cephalodiscid-like epibenthic pterobranchs instead, and argue that Webbyites felix might be a hydrozoan rather than a graptolite.

== Conodonts ==
=== New taxa ===
Name	Novelty	Status	Authors	Age	Type locality	Location	Notes	Images
Acanthodistacodus	Gen. et comb. nov	Valid	Tolmacheva, Dronov & Lykov	Ordovician		Russia	The type species is "Scolopodus" consimilis Moskalenko, (1973); genus also includes A. compositus (Moskalenko, 1973). Published online in 2025, but the issue date is listed as December 2024.	
Ancyrogondolella manueli	Sp. nov	Valid	Karádi	Late Triassic (Norian)		Hungary; China?	A member of the family Gondolellidae.	
Columbitella dagisi	Sp. nov	Valid	Kilic	Early Triassic		Russia (Krasnoyarsk Krai)	A member of the family Gondolellidae.	
Dapsilodus terminus	Sp. nov	Valid	Barrick, Klapper & Peavey	Silurian	Henryhouse Formation	United States (Oklahoma)		
Icriodus multidentatus	Sp. nov	Valid	Nazarova & Soboleva	Devonian (Frasnian)	Ust'-Yarega Formation	Russia (Komi Republic)		
Icriodus quartadecimensis	Sp. nov	Valid	Nazarova & Soboleva	Devonian (Frasnian)	Ust'-Yarega Formation	Russia (Komi Republic)		
Jeppssonia	Gen. et comb. nov	Valid	Barrick, Klapper & Peavey	Silurian		Czech Republic; United States	A new genus for the J. snajdri-J. crispa conodont group.	
Lochriea monocarinata	Sp. nov	Valid	Zhuravlev	Carboniferous (Serpukhovian)		Germany; Ireland; Russia; United Kingdom	A member of the family Spathognathodontidae.	
Neogondolella excentrica primitiva	Ssp. nov	Valid	Orchard & Golding	Middle Triassic		United States (Nevada)		
Neogondolella excentrica sigmoidalis	Ssp. nov	Valid	Orchard & Golding	Middle Triassic		United States (Nevada)		
Neogondolella quasiconstricta	Sp. nov	Valid	Orchard & Golding	Middle Triassic		United States (Nevada)		
Neogondolella quasicornuta	Sp. nov	Valid	Orchard & Golding	Middle Triassic		United States (Nevada)		
Palmatolepis abramovae	Sp. nov	Valid	Tagarieva	Devonian (Famennian)		Russia (Bashkortostan)		
Panderodus cernus	Sp. nov	Valid	Barrick, Klapper & Peavey	Silurian	Henryhouse Formation	United States (Oklahoma)		
Zieglerodina altidens	Sp. nov	Valid	Barrick, Klapper & Peavey	Silurian	Henryhouse Formation	United States (Oklahoma)		

=== Research ===
- Evidence of increased control over biomineralization throughout the early evolution of the conodont feeding apparatus is presented by Shirley et al. (2024).
- A study on changes of composition of Ordovician conodont assemblages from the Baltic region is published by Dzik (2024).
- Redescription of Stiptognathus borealis is published by Zhen (2024).
- Voldman et al. (2024) report the discovery of Moscovian conodonts from the Río del Peñón Formation (La Rioja Province, Argentina) representing the southernmost occurrence of members of the group in the high latitudes of Gondwana from the Late Paleozoic.
- Evidence indicating that the morphological and taxonomic diversity of conodonts was more affected by the Capitanian mass extinction event than by Permian–Triassic extinction event, and that both extinction events were followed by morphological innovation in conodonts, is presented by Xue et al. (2024).
- Huang et al. (2024) describe new assemblages of fossils of Hindeodus parvus from the Lower Triassic (Induan) Feixianguan Formation (Sichuan, China), providing new information on the morphology and arrangement of elements of the feeding apparatus of this conodont.
- Evidence from the study of conodont-bearing bromalites from the Lower Triassic Qinglong Formation (China), interpreted as indicating that conodonts were an important food source for Early Triassic crustaceans, ammonites, ray-finned fishes and coelacanths, is presented by Yao et al. (2024).
- Evidence from the study of Early Triassic conodont material from the Nanzhang-Yuan'an Lagerstätte (Hubei, China), indicative of selective preservation of conodont elements related to their morphologies and methods used to obtain them from the fossil strata, is presented by Wu et al. (2024).
- Ye et al. (2024) provide a redescription and revised diagnosis of Triassospathodus anhuinensis.
- A study on the multielement apparatus of Gladigondolella tethydis is published by Golding & Kılıç (2024), who interpret their findings as supporting the interpretation of Cratognathodus elements as belonging to the apparatus of G. tethydis.

== Amphibians ==
=== New taxa ===
Name	Novelty	Status	Authors	Age	Type locality	Location	Notes	Images
Acheloma cryptatheria	Sp. nov	Valid	Osterling Arias et al.	Early Permian		United States (Oklahoma)	A temnospondyl belonging to the family Trematopidae.	
Bromerpeton	Gen. et sp. nov		MacDougall et al.	Early Permian	Tambach Formation	Germany	A recumbirostran belonging to the family Brachystelechidae. The type species is B. subcolossus.	
Diadectes dreigleichenensis	Sp. nov	Valid	Ponstein, MacDougall & Fröbisch	Early Permian	Tambach Formation	Germany	A member of the family Diadectidae.	
Dvinosaurus gubini	Sp. nov	Valid	Uliakhin & Golubev	Permian		Russia (Mari El)		
Gaiasia	Gen. et sp. nov	Valid	Marsicano et al.	Early Permian	Gai-As Formation	Namibia	A stem tetrapod related to colosteids. The type species is G. jennyae.	
Kermitops	Gen. et sp. nov	Valid	So, Pardo & Mann	Early Permian	Clear Fork Formation	United States (Texas)	An amphibamiform temnospondyl. The type species is K. gratus.	
Kuwavaatakdectes	Gen. et comb. nov	Valid	Ponstein, MacDougall & Fröbisch	Permian	Cutler Formation	United States (Colorado)	A member of the family Diadectidae. The type species is "Diadectes" sanmiguelensis Lewis & Vaughn (1965).	
Kwatisuchus	Gen. et sp. nov		Pinheiro et al.	Early Triassic	Sanga do Cabral Formation	Brazil	A benthosuchid temnospondyl. The type species is K. rosai.	
Memonomenos amelangi	Sp. nov	Valid	Werneburg & Schoch	Permian (Asselian)	Goldlauter Formation	Germany	A stereospondylomorph temnospondyl.	
Ninumbeehan	Gen. et sp. nov	Valid	So et al.	Late Triassic	Jelm Formation	United States (Wyoming)	A stereospondyl temnospondyl. The type species is N. dookoodukah.	
Ostrombatrachos	Gen. et sp. nov		Oreska et al.	Early Cretaceous (Albian)	Cloverly Formation	United States (Wyoming)	A frog. The type species is O. nodos.	
Parotosuchus decumanticus	Sp. nov	Valid	Schoch & Moreno	Early Triassic (Olenekian)	Volpriehausen Formation	Germany		
Stenokranio	Gen. et sp. nov	Valid	Werneburg et al.	Carboniferous-Permian transition (Gzhelian/Asselian)	Remigiusberg Formation	Germany	An eryopid temnospondyl. The type species is S. boldi.	
Telmatobius achachila	Sp. nov		Gómez et al.	Miocene	Mauri Formation	Bolivia	A species of Telmatobius.	
Volgerpeton	Gen. et sp. nov	Valid	Bulanov	Permian		Russia (Tatarstan)	A member of Seymouriamorpha belonging to the family Karpinskiosauridae. The type species is V. exspectatus.	
Ymboirana	Gen. et sp. nov	Valid	Santos et al.	Oligocene	Tremembé Formation	Brazil	A typhlonectid caecilian. The type species is Y. acrux.	

=== Research ===
- Review of evidence of the habitat of environments of early stegocephalians is published by Laurin (2024).
- A study on the fossils and paleosols of the Devonian Hervey Group (New South Wales, Australia) is published by Retallack (2024), who interprets his findings as indicating that Metaxygnathus lived within streams among subhumid woodlands, and argues that tetrapod limbs and necks most likely evolved in woodland streams.
- Redescription and a study on the affinities of Ossirarus kierani is published by Smithson, Ruta & Clack (2024).
- Porro, Martin-Silverstone & Rayfield (2024) redescribe the anatomy of the skull of Eoherpeton watsoni and present a new, three-dimensional reconstruction of the skull.
- Review of the origin of the amphibian metamorphosis, as indicated by data from the fossil record of larvae of temnospondyls, is published by Schoch & Witzmann (2024).
- A study on changes of the diversity of the temnospondyls from India and South-East Asia throughout the Triassic period is published by Chakravorti, Roy & Sengupta (2024).
- A study on changes in the geographical distribution of temnospondyls in the Middle and Late Triassic is published by Moreno et al. (2024), who interpret the Central European Basin as a likely focal point for diversification and further spread of temnospondyls.
- Redescription and a study on the affinities of Syndyodosuchus tetricus, Clamorosaurus nocturnus and C. borealis is published by Werneburg & Witzmann (2024).
- Gee & Sidor (2024) describe new fossil material of temnospondyls from the Triassic Fremouw Formation (Antarctica), including remains of the relict dissorophoid Micropholis stowi and remains of immature capitosaurs representing some of the smallest known members of the group.
- Moreno et al. (2024) revise the fossil material of temnospondyls from the Triassic Grabfeld Formation (Germany), providing evidence of the presence of four taxa (a capitosaur and members of the genera Metoposaurus, Gerrothorax and Plagiosternum).
- Redescription of Cherninia denwai, based on the study of new fossil material from the Triassic Denwa Formation (India), is published by Roy, Chakravorti & Sengupta (2024).
- A study on the ontogenetic changes in Mastodonsaurus giganteus is published by Schoch et al. (2024).
- Evidence from the study of the mandibles of specimens of Metoposaurus krasiejowensis, interpreted as indicative of different lifestyles of members of a single population of this species (some more aquatic and some more terrestrial), is presented by Quarto & Antczak (2024).
- Redescription of the skeletal anatomy and a study on the affinities of Plagiosaurus depressus is published by Witzmann & Schoch (2024).
- Prino et al. (2024) describe fossil material of members of Capitosauria and Plagiosaurinae from the Rhaetian Exter Formation (Germany), representing the stratigraphically youngest records of both groups reported to date.
- So & Mann (2024) revise temnospondyl fossils from the Moenkopi Formation (Arizona, United States), and report evidence of the presence of a member of Brachyopoidea with large, robust teeth, distinct from Hadrokkosaurus bradyi and Vigilius wellesi.
- Redescription and a study on the affinities of Hyperokynodon keuperinus is published by Schoch (2024).
- A study on the affinities of Chinlestegophis jenkinsi is published by Marjanović et al. (2024), whose phylogenetic analysis doesn't support the interpretation of C. jenkinsi and stereospondyls in general as stem caecilians.
- Serra Silva (2024) reevaluates evidence from the study of Pardo, Small & Huttenlocker (2017) supporting the origin of caecilians and other extant amphibians from different temnospondyl lineages, and reports that the morphological data matrix from that study is not robust to changes in analytical parameters.
- A study on the morphology and histology of the humerus and femora of Kulgeriherpeton ultimum is published by Skutschas et al. (2024).
- A study on the morphology and histology of the femora of Kiyatriton krasnolutskii and K. leshchinskiyi is published by Skutschas et al. (2024), who find evidence of similarity in the structure of the femora of the Middle Jurassic and Early Cretaceous members of the genus Kiyatriton.
- Syromyatnikova et al. (2024) describe fossil material of a member of the genus Andrias from the Pliocene Belorechensk Formation (Krasnodar Krai, Russia), representing one of the geologically youngest and easternmost records of giant salamanders in Europe reported to date.
- Redescription and a study on the affinities of Bishara backa is published by Skutschas et al. (2024), who recover this species as a crown proteid.
- Chuliver et al. (2024) describe a late-stage tadpole of Notobatrachus degiustoi from the Middle Jurassic La Matilde Formation (Argentina), representing the oldest tadpole reported to date.
- A specimen of Gansubatrachus qilianensis preserved with eggs within its body, interpreted as a skeletally immature gravid female, is described from the Lower Cretaceous Zhonggou Formation (China) by Du et al. (2024).
- Santos, Carvalho & Zaher (2024) describe fossil material of an indeterminate neobatrachian frog from the Eocene–Oligocene Aiuruoca Basin (Brazil), expanding known diversity of frogs from the studied unit.
- A study on the taphonomy of Eocene frog fossils from the Geiseltal Lagerstätte (Germany) is published by Falk et al. (2024), who find no evidence of silicification of soft tissues, as well as no evidence of preservation of most of the soft tissues reported as preserved in earlier studies, interpret the fossil microbodies preserved with the frogs as more likely to be melanosomes than bacteria, and interpret the mode of soft tissue preservation in frogs from Geiseltal as similar to those of other fossil vertebrates from lacustrine ecosystems.
- Evidence from the study of gut contents of a tadpole of Pelobates cf. decheni from the Enspel Lagerstätte (Germany), indicating that European spadefoot toad tadpoles were already feeding on pollen in the late Oligocene, is presented by Wuttke et al. (2024).
- New assemblage of frog fossils, including possible brachycephaloids, odontophrynids and hemiphractids, is described from the Eocene Geste Formation (Argentina) by Gómez et al. (2024).
- Zimicz et al. (2024) describe remains of Ceratophrys from the Palo Pintado Formation (Salta, Argentina), interpreted as evidence of climatic conditions in the late Miocene resembling those in the semiarid Gran Chaco.
- Description of amphibian assemblages from the late Eocene – early Oligocene strata from the Transylvanian Basin (Romania) is published by Venczel et al. (2024).
- A diverse assemblage of amphibian fossils is described from the Miocene and Pliocene strata from the Hambach surface mine (Germany) by Villa, Macaluso & Mörs (2024), who interpret the studied fossils as indicative of a humid climate persisting in the area throughout the Neogene.
- New fossil material of amphibians, including two salamander and seven frog taxa, is described from the Miocene and Pliocene localities in Greece by Georgalis et al. (2024).
- Description of the fossil material of Pleistocene amphibians from the Taurida Cave (Crimea) is published by Syromyatnikova & Tarasova (2024).
- New information on the morphology and distribution of Kotlassia prima, based on the study of remains from five localities in Eastern Europe, is published by Bulanov (2024), who interprets the studied remains as extending the stratigraphic range of Kotlassia up to the terminal Permian, as well as suggestive of more terrestrial ecology for the adult state of K. prima compared to its late Permian relatives, and indicating that K. prima was a predator with a wide trophic niche.
- Reisz, Maho & Modesto (2024) reevaluate the affinities of recumbirostrans and lysorophians, arguing that the studied tetrapods were not amniotes.
- Modesto (2024) reviews the phylogenetic studies that recovered diadectomorphs or recumbirostrans within the crown group of Amniota, and argues that the data presented so far is not sufficient to confidently classify both groups as amniotes.
- Voigt et al. (2024) described diadectid footprints associated with a partial scaly body impression from the Permian strata in Poland, providing evidence of the presence of horned scales in tetrapods close to the origin of amniotes.

== Synapsids ==
=== Non-mammalian synapsids ===
==== New taxa ====
Name	Novelty	Status	Authors	Age	Type locality	Location	Notes	Images
Dianoconodon	Gen. et sp. nov	Valid	Mao et al.	Early Jurassic	Lufeng Formation	China	A morganucodontan-like mammaliaform. The type species is D. youngi.	
Docodon hercynicus	Sp. nov	Valid	Martin et al.	Late Jurassic (Kimmeridgian)	Süntel Formation	Germany		
Ergetiis	Gen. et sp. nov		Averianov et al.	Early Cretaceous	Batylykh Formation	Russia (Sakha Republic)	A tegotheriid docodont. The type species is E. ichchi.	
Feredocodon	Gen. et sp. nov	Valid	Mao et al.	Middle Jurassic (Bathonian–Callovian)		China	A shuotheriid mammaliaform. The type species is F. chowi.	
Impumlophantsi	Gen. et sp. nov	Valid	Matlhaga, Benoit & Rubidge	Permian	Abrahamskraal Formation	South Africa	A biarmosuchian belonging to the group Burnetiamorpha. The type species is I. boonstrai.	
Jiucaiyuangnathus	Gen. et sp. nov	Valid	Liu & Abdala	Early Triassic	Jiucaiyuan Formation	China	A therocephalian belonging to the group Baurioidea. The type species is J. confusus.	
Nyaphulia	Gen. et comb. nov	Valid	Duhamel et al.	Permian (Guadalupian)	Abrahamskraal Formation	South Africa	A basal dicynodont. New genus for "Eodicynodon" oelofseni, the type species.	
Paratraversodon	Gen. et sp. nov	Valid	Kerber et al.	Triassic		Brazil	A traversodontid cynodont. The type species is P. franciscaensis.	
Riojanodon	Gen. et sp. nov	Valid	Martinelli et al.	Triassic	Chañares Formation	Argentina	A chiniquodontid cynodont. The type species is R. nenoi.	

==== Research ====
- Singh et al. (2024) provide evidence of a dramatic shift in the jaw functional morphology of carnivorous synapsids across the early-middle Permian transition, and interpret their findings as indicative of changes of feeding ecologies of predatory synapsids related to increasingly dynamic behaviors and interactions in the studied time interval.
- A study on the evolution of tooth morphology of non-mammalian synapsids, providing evidence of independent evolution of morphologically complex teeth in multiple synapsid lineages and evidence of independent secondary simplification of teeth in at least two lineages of non-mammalian cynodonts, is published by Harano & Asahara (2024).
- Miyamae et al. (2024) study maxillary and mandibular canal morphology in extant and fossil tetrapods, and interpret the evolution of the studied canals in synapsids as correlated with a shift from increased sensitivity of the rostral tip of the jaws to touch in early nonmammalian synapsids to the use of mobile whiskers as sensory organs emerging in Triassic cynodonts.
- Jones, Angielczyk & Pierce (2024) reconstruct the range of motion of intervertebral joints of eight non-mammalian synapsids, and argue that several key aspects of mammalian vertebral function first evolved before the appearance of the mammalian crown group.
- Bishop & Pierce (2024) present reconstructions of the hindlimb musculature of Ophiacodon retroversus, Dimetrodon milleri, Oudenodon bainii, Lycaenops ornatus, Regisaurus jacobi, Massetognathus pascuali, Megazostrodon and Vincelestes neuquenianus.
- Bishop & Pierce (2024) study the locomotor evolution of synapsids, providing evidence of a complex history of changes of locomotor versatility during the synapsid evolution (including temporary increases of hindlimb performance in non-cynodont therapsids and early cynodonts, followed by a reversal in locomotor performance in later diverging synapsids), and report evidence indicating that therian-like erect hindlimb function only evolved shortly before the origin of the crown group of therians themselves.
- Evidence of functional differentiation of teeth of Mesenosaurus efremovi is presented by Maho et al. (2024).
- Maho, Holmes & Reisz (2024) describe new fossil material of large-bodied synapsids from the Richards Spur locality (Oklahoma, United States), including fossil material of a sphenacodontid which might be distinct from known members of the group and the first ophiacodontid material from this locality; the authors use photography, stipple drawings and coquille drawings for visual representation of the studied material, and argue that three forms of visual representation provide more information about the specimens compared to only using photographs.
- Benoit et al. (2024) report evidence of neurological adaptations of Cistecynodon parvus to low-frequency hearing and low-light conditions, evidence that facial bosses of Pachydectes elsi were likely richly innervated and better suited for display, communication or species recognition than physical combat, and evidence of a healed braincase injury in a specimen of Moschognathus whaitsi, interpreted as likely head-butting related injury resulting from play-fighting of juveniles.
- Benoit & Midzuk (2024) provide new estimates of the endocranial volume and body size of Anteosaurus magnificus, Jonkeria truculenta and Moschops sp.
- Description of the cranial morphology of Jonkeria truculenta is published by Jirah, Rubidge & Abdala (2024), who also revise the family Titanosuchidae and interpret is as including two valid species (Jonkeria truculenta and Titanosuchus ferox).
- Purported bolosaurid Davletkulia gigantea is reinterpreted as a dinocephalian belonging to the group Tapinocephaloidea by Bulanov (2024).
- Evidence of significant shape differences between juvenile and adult skulls of Diictodon feliceps, likely caused by the development of the musculature of the jaw related to a dietary shift later in ontogeny, is published by Rabe et al. (2024).
- Taxonomic revision of the genus Endothiodon is published by Maharaj et al. (2024).
- Shi & Liu (2024) describe new specimens of Turfanodon bogdaensis from the Permian Guodikeng Formation (Turpan, Xinjiang, China), providing new information on the skeletal anatomy of this species.
- Description of the skull anatomy and a study on the affinities of Gordonia is published by George et al. (2024).
- Pinto et al. (2024) tested for sexual dimorphism in Placerias, finding statistical evidence for two morphs of the size and length of the caniniform process but in no other studied elements, and suggest this is a secondary sexual trait.
- A study on the skeletal anatomy and phylogenetic relationships of Lisowicia bojani is published by Sulej (2024).
- Matamales-Andreu et al. (2024) describe fossil material of an indeterminate gorgonopsian from the Permian (Cisuralian–Guadalupian) strata of the Port des Canonge Formation (Mallorca, Spain), representing the oldest record of the group reported to date, and interpret this finding as evidence of presence of therapsids in the equatorial areas of Pangaea during early–middle Permian transition.
- A study on the bone histology of gorgonopsians is published by Botha (2024), who reports evidence indicating that gorgonopsians were able grow quickly during favorable seasons, but also that they had the capacity for longer lifespans and slower maturation compared to Early Triassic therapsids.
- Sidor & Mann (2024) describe an articulated sternum and interclavicle of a specimen of Aelurognathus tigriceps from the upper Madumabisa Mudstone Formation (Zambia), providing new information on the anatomy of the sternum in gorgonopsians.
- Brant & Sidor (2024) describe a premaxilla of a member of the genus Inostrancevia from the Permian Usili Formation (Tanzania), representing the oldest record of the genus from the Southern Hemisphere reported to date.
- Benoit et al. (2024) reevaluate the provenance of three gorgonopsian specimens from purported Lower Triassic strata in the Karoo Basin (South Africa), and interpret the studied fossils as expanding the range of the genus Cyonosaurus higher up in the extinction zone, but don't confirm the survival of gorgonopsians past the Permian–Triassic extinction event.
- A study on the phylogeny of the Eutheriodontia and on the character evolution within the group is published by Pusch, Kammerer & Fröbisch (2024), who recover therocephalians as paraphyletic with regards to cynodonts.
- Stuart, Huttenlocker & Botha (2024) describe the anatomy of the postcranial skeleton of Moschorhinus kitchingi.
- Evidence from the study on the type locality of Nythosaurus larvatus, interpreted as indicative of distinctiveness of this taxon and its late Olenekian age, is presented by Benoit et al. (2024).
- A study on dental complexity in gomphodont cynodonts through time, indicating that the peak in postcanine complexity was reached early in the gomphodont evolution, is published by Hendrickx et al. (2024).
- Müller et al. (2024) report the first discovery of fossils of Protuberum cabralense from the late Ladinian to early Carnian Linha Várzea 1 site (Brazil), and find that Protuberum is absent in fossiliferous sites that yielded fossils of Luangwa, which might be indicative of a subdivision within the Dinodontosaurus Assemblage Zone.
- Schmitt et al. (2024) revise the skull anatomy of Protuberum cabralense, reinterpret it as nested outside Gomphodontosuchinae, and report new occurrences of the species that expand its geographical distribution within the Dinodontosaurus Assemblage Zone.
- Roese-Miron et al. (2024) report the discovery of a specimen of Siriusgnathus niemeyerorum from Upper Triassic strata from the Várzea do Agudo site (Candelária Sequence of the Santa Maria Supersequence, Brazil), found above the layers yielding Exaeretodon riograndensis, and evaluate the implications of this finding for the biostratigraphy of the sites of the Candelária Sequence.
- Figueiredo et al. (2024) describe a new concentration of fossils of Exaeretodon riograndensis from the Várzea do Agudo site, preserving specimens representing various ontogenetic stages, and interpret this concentration as suggestive of gregarious behavior in E. riograndensis.
- Kaiuca et al. (2024) provide new body mass estimates for multiple cynodont taxa, and report that rates of body size evolution were lower in prozostrodontians ancestral to the first Mammaliaformes than in other lineages.
- A study on nasal cavities of Thrinaxodon, Chiniquodon, Prozostrodon, Riograndia and Brasilodon is published by Fonseca et al. (2024), who find no evidence of the presence of ossified turbinals in the nasal cavities of the studied cynodonts, but report evidence of increase in the anatomical complexity of the structures anchoring the cartilages in the nasal region in cynodont lineages closer to mammaliaforms.
- A study on the jaw joint anatomy of Brasilodon quadrangularis, Riograndia guaibensis and Oligokyphus major is published by Rawson et al. (2024), who find that a dentary–squamosal contact evolved independently in ictidosaurs before its first appearance in mammaliaforms.
- Description of the anatomy of the maxillary canal of Riograndia guaibensis is published by Fonseca et al. (2024), who report evidence of the presence of pneumatization in the anterior region of the skull.
- Szczygielski et al. (2024) redescribe Saurodesmus robertsoni, interpreting it as a valid cynodont taxon, possibly belonging to the family Tritylodontidae.
- Hurtado, Harris & Milner (2024) describe possible eucynodont tracks from the Lower Jurassic Moenave Formation (Utah, United States), probably made in fine-grained sand on a flat lake shore (thus representing rare finding of early Mesozoic synapsid tracks outside eolian settings), and expanding known diversity of Early Jurassic animals from the Whitmore Point Member of the Moenave Formation.
- New information on the morphology of the inner ear and stapes of Morganucodon is presented by Hoffmann et al. (2024).
- Martin et al. (2024) describe new molars of Storchodon cingulatus from the Kimmeridgian Süntel Formation (Germany), and interpret the studied fossils as confirming the morganucodontan affinities of S. cingulatus, as well as confirming it as one of the largest morganucodontans.
- Averianov & Voyta (2024) reinterpret fossil material of a putative Triassic stem mammal Tikitherium copei as a tooth of a Neogene shrew.
- Panciroli et al. (2024) describe new juvenile and adult specimens of Krusatodon kirtlingtonensis from the Kilmaluag Formation (United Kingdom), and interpret the studied fossils as indicating that K. kirtlingtonensis had longer development and lifespan than extant mammals of comparable adult body mass.
- A study on the growth of dental cementum in Jurassic mammaliaforms from the Hettangian Hirmeriella fissure suite (Wales, United Kingdom), Bathonian Forest Marble fauna (Oxfordshire, United Kingdom) and the Kimmeridgian Guimarota fauna (Portugal) is published by Newham et al. (2024), who find that none of the studied mammaliaforms (including early crown mammals) reached growth rates and metabolic levels of extant mammals of similar size, but also find evidence of faster growth of early crown mammals compated to earlier mammaliaforms, and argue that the modern mammalian growth strategy evolved at the time of the mid-Jurassic radiation of crown mammals.
- A study on synapsid species richness and distribution throughout the Mesozoic is published by Brocklehurst (2024), who finds evidence of two phases of decline of non-mammalian synapsids – a restriction of their geographic range between the Triassic and Middle Jurassic, and a decline in species richness during the Early Cretaceous.

== Other animals ==
=== New taxa ===
Name	Novelty	Status	Authors	Age	Type locality	Location	Notes	Images
Aerobius	Gen. et sp. nov		Mapalo, Wolfe & Ortega-Hernández	Late Cretaceous (Campanian)		Canada (Manitoba)	A tardigrade belonging to the superfamily Hypsibioidea. The type species is A. dactylus.	
Annulitubus fernandesi	Sp. nov		Scheffler et al.	Devonian	Pimenteira Formation	Brazil	An annelid.	
Archiasterella acuminata	Sp. nov	Valid	Zhang & Wang in Zhang et al.	Cambrian Stage 4	Balang Formation	China	A chancelloriid.	
Arimasia	Gen. et sp. nov	Valid	Runnegar et al.	Ediacaran	Urusis Formation	Namibia	A sponge, possibly a member of Archaeocyatha and Monocyathida. The type species is A. germsi.	
Aulacera vohilaidia	Sp. nov	Valid	Jeon & Toom	Ordovician (Katian)	Adila Formation	Estonia	A member of Stromatoporoidea belonging to the group Labechiida and the family Aulaceratidae.	
Australolithes	Gen. et sp. nov	Valid	Burrow & Smith	Devonian (Lochkovian)	Connemarra Formation	Australia	A member of Hyolitha belonging to the family Hyolithidae. The type species is A. troffsensis.	
Beretella	Gen. et sp. nov	Valid	Han, Guo, Wang and Qiang in Wang et al.	Cambrian Stage 2	Yanjiahe Formation	China	A member of Saccorhytida. The type species is B. spinosa.	
Brigoconus	Gen. et sp. nov	Valid	Malinky & Geyer	Cambrian	Brigus Formation	Canada (Newfoundland and Labrador)	A hyolith. Genus includes new species B. greavesi.	
Camptodictyon contortus	Sp. nov	Valid	Jeon & Kershaw in Jeon et al.	Ordovician (Hirnantian)	Shiqian Formation	China	A member of Stromatoporoidea.	
Conchicolites corbalengus	Sp. nov		Vinn et al.	Ordovician (Hirnantian)		Estonia	A member of Cornulitida.	
Cornulites leonei	Sp. nov		Vinn et al.	Ordovician	Portixeddu Formation	Italy	A member of Cornulitida.	
Cornulites levigatus	Sp. nov		Vinn et al.	Ordovician (Hirnantian)		Estonia	A member of Cornulitida.	
Cretacimermis dolor	Sp. nov		Fang, Poinar & Luo in Fang et al.	Cretaceous	Burmese amber	Myanmar	A nematode belonging to the family Mermithidae.	
Cystostroma rallus	Sp. nov	Valid	Jeon in Jeon et al.	Ordovician (Hirnantian)	Shiqian Formation	China	A member of Stromatoporoidea.	
Ecclimadictyon ancipitum	Sp. nov	Valid	Jeon in Jeon et al.	Ordovician (Hirnantian)	Shiqian Formation	China	A member of Stromatoporoidea.	
Entothyreos	Gen. et sp. nov	Valid	Aria & Caron	Cambrian (Wuliuan)	Burgess Shale	Canada (British Columbia)	A luolishaniid lobopodian. The type species is E. synnaustrus.	
Fouanoucyathus	Gen. et sp. nov	Valid	El Bakhouch & Kerner in El Bakhouch et al.	Cambrian	Issafen Formation	Morocco	A member of Archaeocyatha belonging to the group Ajacicyathida and the family Carinacyathidae. The type species is F. tafraoutiensis.	
Gaparella elenae	Sp. nov	Valid	Luzhnaya	Cambrian		Mongolia	A problematic microfossil, possibly a sponge.	
Gzhelistella	Gen. et sp. nov	Valid	Davydov et al.	Carboniferous (Gzhelian)	Kosherovo Formation	Russia (Moscow Oblast)	A calcareous sponge. The type species is G. cornigera. Published online in 2024, but the issue date is listed as December 2023.	
Helicolocellus	Gen. et sp. nov	Valid	Wang et al.	Ediacaran	Dengying Formation	China	A sponge related to the Hexactinellida. The type species is H. cantori.	
Keithospongos	Gen. et sp. nov		Kolesnikov et al.	Cambrian	Sinsk Lagerstätte	Russia	A sponge. Genus includes new species K. loricatus.	
Levinoconus	Gen. et sp. nov	Valid	Malinky & Geyer	Cambrian	Brigus Formation	Canada (Newfoundland and Labrador)	A hyolith. Genus includes new species L. florencei.	
Lobodiscus	Gen. et sp. nov		Zhao et al.	Ediacaran	Dengying Formation	China	A possible member of Trilobozoa. The type species is L. tribrachialis.	
Mianxiantubus	Gen. et 3 sp. nov		Luo et al.	Cambrian Stage 3	Guojiaba Formation	China	A tubicolous animal with possible affinities with cloudinomorph fossils, possibly a cnidarian. The type species is M. cyathiformis; genus also includes M. obconicus and M. varius.	
Neomenispongia	Gen. et sp. nov		Kolesnikov et al.	Cambrian	Sinsk Lagerstätte	Russia	An early heteroscleromorph demosponge. Genus includes N. plexa and N. diazoma.	
Neomicrorbis israelicus	Sp. nov		Vinn et al.	Middle Jurassic (Callovian)		Israel	A spirorbine polychaete.	
Nuucichthys	Gen. et sp. nov	Valid	Lerosey-Aubril & Ortega-Hernández	Cambrian (Drumian)	Marjum Formation	United States (Utah)	A soft-bodied stem-vertebrate. The type species is N. rhynchocephalus.	
Omnidens qiongqii	Sp. nov	Disputed	Li et al.	Cambrian		China	A "gilled lobopodian" panarthropod, species of Omnidens. McCall (2025) suggested that it is likely synonymous with O. amplus.	
Paradeningeria magna	Sp. nov	Valid	Malysheva	Permian		Russia (Primorsky Krai)	A sponge.	
Polygoniella	Gen. et sp. nov	Valid	Del Mouro et al.	Cambrian (Drumian)	Marjum Formation	United States (Utah)	A sponge, a member of the total group of Hexactinellida. The type species is P. turrelli.	
Porkuniconchus	Gen. et sp. nov	Valid	Vinn, Wilson & Toom	Ordovician (Hirnantian)	Ärina Formation	Estonia	A member of Cornulitida. The type species is P. fragilis.	
Poutinella	Gen. et sp. nov	Valid	Malinky & Geyer	Cambrian	Brigus Formation	Canada (Newfoundland and Labrador)	A hyolith. Genus includes new species P. crispenae.	
Quaestio	Gen. et sp. nov		Evans et al.	Ediacaran		Australia	A motile animal preserving evidence of left-right asymmetry of its body. The type species is Q. simpsonorum.	
Saccus	Gen. et 2 sp. nov		Liu et al.	Cambrian (Fortunian)	Kuanchuanpu Formation	China	An ecdysozoan described on the basis of fossil embryos. Genus includes S. xixiangensis and S. necopinus.	
Selkirkia tsering	Sp. nov	Valid	Nanglu & Ortega-Hernández	Ordovician (Tremadocian)	Fezouata Formation	Morocco		
Serpula? alicecooperi	Sp. nov	Valid	Kočí et al.	Early Jurassic (Pliensbachian)	Hasle Formation	Denmark	A polychaete belonging to the family Serpulidae.	
Shishania	Gen. et sp. nov	Valid	Zhang et al.	Cambrian Stage 4	Wulongqing Formation	China	An animal of uncertain affinities. Originally described as a shell-less stem mollusc, but subsequently argued to be a chancelloriid. The type species is S. aculeata.	
Sororistirps altynensis	Sp. nov	Valid	Pervushov	Late Cretaceous (Maastrichtian)		Russia (Saratov Oblast)	A hexactinellid sponge belonging to the family Ventriculitidae.	
Sororistirps antetubiforme	Sp. nov	Valid	Pervushov	Late Cretaceous (Santonian)		Kazakhstan; Russia (Samara Oblast; Saratov Oblast; Volgograd Oblast)	A hexactinellid sponge belonging to the family Ventriculitidae.	
Sororistirps postradiatum	Sp. nov	Valid	Pervushov	Late Cretaceous (Santonian)		Kazakhstan; Russia (Samara Oblast; Saratov Oblast)	A hexactinellid sponge belonging to the family Ventriculitidae.	
Spirorbis? hagadolensis	Sp. nov		Vinn et al.	Middle Jurassic (Callovian)		Israel	Possibly a species of Spirorbis.	
Spitiprion	Gen. et sp. nov	Valid	Tonarová, Suttner, & Hints in Tonarová et al.	Ordovician (Katian)	Takche Formation	India	A polychaete belonging to the family Ramphoprionidae. The type species is S. khannai.	
Timorebestia	Gen. et sp. nov		Park et al.	Cambrian	Sirius Passet Lagerstätte	Greenland	A member of the stem group of Chaetognatha. The type species is T. koprii.	
Toutonella	Gen. et sp. nov	Valid	Malinky & Geyer	Cambrian	Brigus Formation	Canada (Newfoundland and Labrador)	A hyolith. Genus includes new species T. chaddockae.	
Tribrachidium gehlingi	Sp. nov	Valid	Botha & García-Bellido	Ediacaran	Rawnsley Quartzite	Australia		
Uncus	Gen. et sp. nov	Valid	Hughes, Evans & Droser	Ediacaran		Australia	A bilaterian with ecdysozoan affinities. The type species is U. dzaugisi.	
Vetus naomi	Sp. nov		Poinar	Eocene	Baltic amber	Europe (Baltic Sea region)	A nematode.	
Wiwaxia douposiensis	Sp. nov		Sun et al.	Cambrian Stage 4	Douposi Formation	China		
Xiaoshibachaeta	Gen. et sp. nov	Valid	Yang et al.	Cambrian Stage 3	Hongjingshao Formation	China	An annelid. The type species is X. biodiversa.	

=== Research ===
- Morais et al. (2024) report the discovery of approximately 571-million-years-old microfossils from the Bocaina Formation (Brazil), sharing anatomical similarities with sections of cloudinids, protoconodonts, anabaritids and hyolithids, and interpreted as likely remains of early animals.
- Delahooke et al. (2024) study frondose specimens from Ediacaran strata in Newfoundland (Canada) found forming closely spaced, linear arrangements, and interpret them as likely formed by runner-like stolons, providing possible evidence of a previously unknown reproductive strategy of rangeomorphs.
- Cao, Meng & Cai (2024) use electrochemical methods to simulate the process of tube generation of Cloudina under the same phosphorus content as modern seawater.
- Fossil evidence from the Terreneuvian blue clays of Estonia, indicative of survival of the Ediacaran cloudinid Conotubus hemiannulatus into the early Cambrian, is presented by Vinn et al. (2024).
- Wang et al. (2024) describe fossil material of two distinct types of archaeocyaths from the Cambrian Shuijingtuo and Xiannüdong formations (China), including fossils with complicated interior network of canals which might be remains of a water filtration mechanism more complex and efficient than the ones seen in sponges.
- Pruss et al. (2024) describe fossil material of Archaeocyathus from the Cambrian Mule Spring Limestone (Nevada) and Carrara Formation (California, United States), representing some of the latest record of archaeocyaths and providing evidence of local survival of members of the group after the disappearance of diverse archaeocyath reefs in western Laurentia, into the later Cambrian Age 4; the authors interpret their findings as an example of the dead clade walking phenomenon.
- Review of events of decline in the evolutionary history of stromatoporoids is published by Kershaw & Jeon (2024).
- Botha et al. (2024) compare the morphology of Tribrachidium heraldicum and T. gehlingi, confirming that the two species were distinct.
- A study on the functional morphology of Tribrachidium heraldicum is published by Olaru et al. (2024), who interpret Tribrachidium as a macroscopic suspension feeder.
- Zhao et al. (2024) redescribe Calathites spinalis, and interpret it as a stem-ctenophore belonging to the family Dinomischidae.
- Peel (2024) describes phosphatised central ray canals preserved within rays of a sclerite of Chancelloria from the Cambrian Henson Gletscher Formation (Greenland), sharing similarities with the robust central canal of the halkieriid Sinosachites, and interprets this finding as adding support to the notion that coeloscleritophorans are a paraphyletic group and that pre-bilaterian and bilaterian coeloscleritophorans underwent parallel episodes of calcareous mineralization.
- Turk et al. (2024) redescribe the type material of Archaeichnium haughtoni, and interpret it as one of the earliest examples of marine worm burrow linings in the fossil record reported to date.
- A specimen of Cricocosmia jinningensis preserved in the act of moulting is described from the Cambrian Chengjiang Lagerstätte (China) by Yu, Wang & Han (2024), who present a reconstruction of the moulting process of C. jinningensis.
- Howard et al. (2024) redescribe "Protoscolex" latus and transfer this species to the genus Radnorscolex.
- Turk et al. (2024) describe trace fossils similar to modern and Cambrian priapulid worm burrows from the Ediacaran Urusis Formation (Namibia), interpreted as likely produced by a total-group scalidophoran tracemaker, and name a new ichnotaxon Himatiichnus mangano.
- Vannier (2024) interprets Saccorhytus as a possible larval stage of one of the scalidophoran worms from the Kuanchuanpu biota.
- Chen et al. (2024) describe new fossil material of Microdictyon from the Cambrian Qiongzhusi Formation (China), providing new information on the molting process of lobopodians, and evidence of similarities of the sclerites of Microdictyon and extant armored tardigrades.
- A body fossil resembling tentacles of extant trypanorhynch tapeworms is described from the Cretaceous amber from Myanmar by Luo et al. (2024).
- Yang et al. (2024) describe new fossil material of Gaoloufangchaeta bifurcus from the Cambrian Wulongqing Formation (China), and interpret G. bifurcus as the earliest known errantian annelid.
- Tubular fossils which might belong to early sabellids are described from the Upper Permian deposits in southern China by Słowiński, Clapham & Zatoń (2024), potentially expanding known range of sabellids during the late Paleozoic.
- Jamison-Todd et al. (2024) describe boring produced by members of the genus Osedax in marine reptile bones from the Cenomanian Lower Chalk (United Kingdom), Campanian Marlbrook Marl and Mooreville Chalk (Arkansas and Alabama, United States) and Maastrichtian Mons Basin (Belgium), providing evidence of the presence of Osedax on both sides of the northern Atlantic Ocean in the Cretaceous, as well as evidence of the presence of different morphotypes of borings which were possibly produced by different species.
- Zhang & Huang (2024) report the discovery of serpulid polychaete dwelling tubes from the Cretaceous amber from Myanmar, expanding known diversity of marine animals preserved in this amber.
- Vinn et al. (2024) describe serpulid fossil material assigned to Parsimonia antiquata from the Maastrichtian Beyobası Formation (Turkey), representing the first record of Parsimonia from the Cretaceous of the Middle East reported to date.
- Mángano et al. (2024) describe fecal mounds from the Kimmeridgian Lastres Formation (Spain) identical to those produced by extant arenicolids, providing evidence of existence of this group during the Late Jurassic, and name a new ichnotaxon Cumulusichnus asturiensis.
- A study on the taxonomic and morphological diversity of Cambrian hyoliths, providing evidence of increase in diversity in the early Cambrian followed by decline in the Miaolingian, is published by Liu et al. (2024).
- Vinn et al. (2024) describe fossil material of tentaculitids with fossilized soft tissues from Devonian strata in Armenia, and interpret the studied soft tissues as refuting molluscan affinities of tentaculitoids, and indicating that tentaculitids shared a common ancestor with bryozoans.
- Mussini et al. (2024) report evidence for the presence of a gut canal and a dorsal nerve chord in Pikaia, and recover vetulicolians, Yunnanozoon and Pikaia as early-diverging stem chordates.
- The most diverse assemblage of fossil ascidian spicules in the world reported to date is described from the Miocene strata from Bogutovo Selo (Bosnia and Herzegovina) by Łukowiak et al. (2024), who find that the studied assemblage had closer resemblance to Eocene ascidians from Australia than to Miocene ascidians from Eastern Paratethys, providing evidence of wide distribution of Eocene ascidian fauna and its persistence into the Miocene.

== Other organisms ==
=== New taxa ===
Name	Novelty	Status	Authors	Age	Type locality	Location	Notes	Images
Alienum	Gen. et sp. nov		Liu et al.	Ediacaran		China	A sail-shaped organism of uncertain affinities, with similarities to vetulicolians. The type species is A. velamenus.	
Ancyrochitina wilsonae	Sp. nov	Valid	Klock et al.	Silurian	Chicotte Formation	Canada (Quebec)	A chitinozoan.	
Angochitina monstrosa	Sp. nov		De Backer et al.	Devonian	Sweetland Creek Shale	United States (Iowa)	A chitinozoan.	
Cingulochitina chacoparanaense	Sp. nov	Valid	Camina et al.		Copo Formation	Argentina	A chitinozoan.	
Colum tekini	sp. nov	Valid	Sashida & Ito in Sashida et al.	Upper Triassic (lower Norian)		Thailand	A pseudodictyomitrid radiolarian. Published online in 2023, but the issue date is listed as January 2024.	
Conochitina asselinae	Sp. nov	Valid	Klock et al.	Silurian	Chicotte Formation	Canada (Quebec)	A chitinozoan.	
Ghoshia januarensis	Sp. nov	Valid	Denezine et al.	Ediacaran	Sete Lagoas Formation	Brazil	An organic-walled microfossil.	
Lagenochitina tacobensis	Sp. nov		Camina et al.	Devonian (Givetian)	Los Monos Formation	Bolivia	A chitinozoan.	
Lititzina	Gen. et sp. nov	Valid	Raevskaya & Iskül	Ordovician		Russia (Leningrad Oblast)	An acritarch. Genus includes new species L. cornuta.	
Membranospinosphaera	Nom. et sp. nov		Shang & Liu	Ediacaran	Doushantuo Formation	China	An acritarch; a replacement name for Membranosphaera Liu & Moczydłowska (2019). Genus includes the type species M. formosa Liu & Moczydłowska (2019), as well as a new species M. copia.	
Octahedronoides	Gen. et sp. nov	Valid	Granier	Early Cretaceous (Berriasian to Valanginian)		Spain	An acritarch. The type species is O. tethysianus.	
Palaeorhopalon	Gen. et sp. nov		Dai et al.	Ediacaran	Dengying Formation	China	A tubular organism of uncertain affinities. The type species is P. spiniferum.	
Paniculaferum prodigiosum	Sp. nov	Valid	Raevskaya & Iskül	Ordovician		Russia (Leningrad Oblast)	An acritarch.	
Ramochitina candelariaensis	Sp. nov		Camina et al.	Devonian (Givetian)		Bolivia	A chitinozoan.	
Sandbica	Gen. et 2 sp. nov	Valid	Raevskaya & Iskül	Ordovician		Russia (Leningrad Oblast)	An acritarch. Genus includes new species S. clavata and S. ornata.	
Shufangtubulus	Gen. et sp. nov		Dai & Hua in Dai et al.	Ediacaran	Dengying Formation	China	A tubular organism of uncertain affinities. The type species is S. inornatus.	
Spinachitina glooscapi	Sp. nov	Valid	Klock et al.	Silurian	Jupiter Formation	Canada (Quebec)	A chitinozoan.	
Spinomargosphaera	Nom. nov		Shang & Liu	Ediacaran	Doushantuo Formation	China	An acritarch; a replacement name for Verrucosphaera Liu & Moczydłowska (2019).	
Tadasum	Gen. et sp. nov	Valid	Raevskaya & Iskül	Ordovician		Russia (Leningrad Oblast)	An acritarch. Genus includes new species T. florigerum.	
Tanaisina	Gen. et sp. nov	Valid	Dernov in Dernov & Poletaev	Carboniferous (Bashkirian)	Dyakove Group	Ukraine	An organism of uncertain affinities, with similarities to Escumasia, Caledonicratis and the hydrozoan Drevotella proteana. The type species is T. mavka.	

=== Research ===
- Kanaparthi et al. (2024) compare Archean microfossils from the Pilbara iron formation (Australia) and Barberton Greenstone Belt (South Africa) with extant microbes grown under conditions similar to possible environmental conditions of Archean Earth, and propose that the studied Archean microfossils were liposome-like protocells that had mechanisms for energy conservation, but not for regulating cell morphology and replication.
- Demoulin et al. (2024) interpret Polysphaeroides filiformis from the Proterozoic Mbuji-Mayi Supergroup (Democratic Republic of the Congo) as a photosynthetic cyanobacterium representing the oldest unambiguous complex fossil member of Stigonemataceae known to date.
- Evidence of preservation of thylakoid membranes within 1.78- to 1.73-billion-year-old fossils of Navifusa majensis from the McDermott Formation (Tawallah Group; Australia) and in 1.01- to 0.9-billion-year-old specimens from the Grassy Bay Formation (Shaler Supergroup; Canada) is reported by Demoulin et al. (2024).
- Kolesnikov et al. (2024) describe new fossil material of "Beltanelliformis" konovalovi from the Ediacaran Chernyi Kamen Formation (Perm Krai, Russia), providing evidence of morphological differences with members of the genus Beltanelliformis, and question the assignment of "B." konovalovi to this genus.
- Palacios (2024) describes a diverse assemblage of acritarchs from the Ediacaran Tentudía Formation (Spain), representing the oldest fossils from the Iberian Peninsula reported to date.
- A study comparing the preservation of fossils of cyanobacterial assemblages from the Ediacaran Gaojiashan biota and from the Cambrian Kuanchuanpu biota (China) is published by Min et al. (2024), who interpret the differences of preservation modes of the studied fossils as resulting from changes of atmospheric CO_{2} levels, which may have risen to approximately ten times present atmospheric level during the Ediacaran–Cambrian transition, and from related changes in marine chemical conditions.
- McMahon et al. (2024) describe fossil material of a colony-forming entophysalid cyanobacterium from the Devonian Rhynie chert (Scotland, United Kingdom) with similarities to extant Entophysalis and mostly Proterozoic Eoentophysalis, and interpret this finding as suggestive of persistence of a single lineage with a broad environmental tolerance across 2 billion years.
- Miao et al. (2024) describe 1.63-billion-year-old fossils of Qingshania magnifica from the Chuanlinggou Formation (China), and interpret the studied fossils as indicating that simple multicellularity evolved early in eukaryote history.
- Evidence indicating that multicellular eukaryotic fossils from the Gaoyuzhuang Formation (China) date to the beginning of the Mesoproterozoic is presented by Chen et al. (2024).
- A study on the depositional setting of the strata of the Diabaig and Loch na Dal formations (Scotland, United Kingdom) preserving approximately 1-billion-year-old eukaryotic microfossils is published by Nielson, Stüeken & Prave (2024), who interpret their findings as indicating that early eukaryotes from the studied formations lived in estuaries rather than lakes, and were likely exposed to frequently changing water conditions.
- A study on the evolutionary history of Arcellinida, as indicated by molecular data and fossil record, is published by Porfirio-Sousa et al. (2024), who determine that nodes leading to extant microbial eukaryote lineages originated in the latest Mesoproterozoic and Neoproterozoic, but the divergence of modern subclades of Arcellinida postdates the Silurian.
- Evidence indicating that larger foraminifera were more affected by the Capitanian, Permian–Triassic and Cretaceous–Paleogene extinctions than their smaller relatives is presented by Feng et al. (2024).
- A study on the impact of the climatic and environmental changes across the Cenozoic on the distribution and diversity of planktonic marine foraminifera is published by Swain et al. (2024).
- Evidence indicating that at the end of the Last Glacial Maximum foraminifera without symbionts migrated polewards, while foraminifera with algal symbionts adapted to warming, is presented by Ying et al. (2024).
- Surprenant & Droser (2024) compile a database of all occurrences of non-biomineral Ediacaran tubular organisms, and report evidence of previously unrecognized morphological diversity of the studied organisms.
- Schiffbauer et al. (2024) revise the latest Ediacaran skeletal materials from the La Ciénega Formation (Mexico), providing evidence of the presence of Sinotubulites, cloudinomorphs and smooth-walled organisms of uncertain affinities.
- Sun et al. (2024) provide new information on the developmental biology of Spiralicellula, and reject the interpretation of Spiralicellula and other components of the early Ediacaran Weng'an biota (Doushantuo Formation, China) as members of the animal crown group.
- Mccandless & Droser (2024) interpret fossils of Attenborites janeae as deflated form of living organisms, and interpret A. janeae as likely pelagic organism.
- Rivas et al. (2024) describe a new assemblage of fossils of Gaojiashania from the Ediacaran Deep Spring Formation (Nevada, United States).
- Some foraminifera have begun migrating to cooler waters in an attempt to adapt, but environmental changes are occurring faster than they can keep up with, as reported in Chaabane et al. (2024).

== History of life in general ==
- Moody et al. (2024) interpret the last universal common ancestor as a prokaryote-grade anaerobic acetogen that lived approximately 4.2 billion years ago, had an early immune system and was a part of an established ecological system.
- A study on the diversity of eukaryotes from the Paleoproterozoic to early Cambrian is published by Tang et al. (2024), who report evidence of consistently low diversity before the Cryogenian and its rapid increase in the Ediacaran and early Cambrian.
- Evidence of impact of ocean oxygenation events from Cryogenian to Cambrian on early evolution of animals is presented by Kaiho et al. (2024).
- Crockett et al. (2024) argue that environmental changes at the time of the Snowball Earth generated selective pressures for multicellular morphologies that, combined with constraints caused by different biological organization, gave multicellular eukaryotes an evolutionary advantage not shared by bacteria.
- Carlisle et al. (2024) present a new timescale of metazoan diversification, based on revised fossil calibrations for the major animal groups, and estimate an Ediacaran origin of animals in general, Eumetazoa and Bilateria, with many animal phyla originating across the Ediacaran-Cambrian interval or in the Cambrian.
- Evidence indicating that Ediacaran and Cambrian animal radiations were related to oxygenation events that were linked to major sea level cycles is presented by Bowyer, Wood & Yilales (2024).
- Gutarra et al. (2024) find that Ediacaran marine animal communities from the Mistaken Point Formation (Newfoundland, Canada) were capable of strongly mixing the surrounding water, and might have contributed to the ventilation of the oceans.
- Ediacaran shallow-marine macrofossils from the Llangynog Inlier (Wales, United Kingdom) are determined to be approximately 564.09 million years old by Clarke et al. (2024).
- New silicified fossil assemblage is described from the Ediacaran Dengying Formation (Shaanxi, China) by Dai et al. (2024), who interpret fossil material of Cloudina from this assemblage as indicating that Cloudina had a worldwide distribution in different paleoecologies and biofacies.
- A study on changes of the structure of Ediacaran communities is published by Craffey et al. (2024).
- A study on the Ediacaran and Cambrian trace fossils, providing evidence of diversification and progressive niche partitioning of early animals, is published by Wang, Rahman & Zhang (2024).
- A study on the Ediacaran and Cambrian trace fossils from the Chapel Island Formation (Newfoundland, Canada) is published by Gougeon et al. (2024), who report evidence of progressive diversification of behaviors of tracemakers that began in the lower offshore and later expanded inshore.
- Evidence indicative of existence of long-term factors driving changes of diversity of skeletonized marine invertebrates throughout the Phanerozoic is presented by Wilson, Reitan & Liow (2024).
- A study on the history of bioturbation and reef-building throughout the Phanerozoic is published by Cribb & Darroch (2024), who find evidence of continued increase in dominance of bioturbating ecosystem engineers during the Phanerozoic, while also finding that reef-builders reached their peak dominance in the early Devonian.
- Mángano et al. (2024) review evidence from the fossil record of the significance of bioturbators as ecosystem engineers throughout the history of life, as well as ichnological approaches that can be used to determine ecosystem engineering by bioturbators at different spatial and temporal scales.
- Review of fossil evidence of impact of abrupt climatic changes on marine communities is published by Kiessling et al. (2024).
- Cui et al. (2024) describe approximately 535-million-years-old microbial fossils from the Yuhucun Formation (China), interpreted as comparable to modern cyanobacteria, microalgae and fungi (including mold- and yeast-like morphotypes), and interpret the studied microorganisms as building symbiotic mats composed of decomposers and producers.
- Evidence from the strata of the Dengying, Yanjiahe and Shuijingtuo formations (China), interpreted as indicative of the existence of a relationship between variable oceanic oxygenation, nitrogen supply and the evolution of early Cambrian life, is presented by Wei et al. (2024).
- Slater (2024) describes a diverse assemblage of arthropod and molluscan microfossil from the Cambrian Stage 3 Mickwitzia Sandstone (Sweden), providing evidence of diversification of molluscan radulae which happened by the early Cambrian.
- Evidence indicating that the Emu Bay Shale biota lived in a fan delta complex within a tectonically active, nearshore basin is presented by Gaines et al. (2024).
- Weng et al. (2024) report the discovery of a new assemblage of soft-bodied fossils from the Cambrian Balang Formation (China), including remains of sponges, chancelloriids, cnidarians, hyoliths, brachiopods, arthropods, priapulids and vetulicolians.
- Evidence indicating that pulse of supracrustal deformation along the edge of west Gondwana caused a series of environmental changes that resulted in the Cambrian Stage 4 Sinsk event (the first major extinction of the Phanerozoic) is presented by Myrow et al. (2024).
- Evidence indicating that patterns of extinctions of marine invertebrates over the past 485 million years were affected by physiological traits of invertebrates and by climate changes is presented by Malanoski et al. (2024).
- Saleh et al. (2024) report the discovery of a new Early Ordovician Lagerstätte from Montagne Noire (France), preserving fossils of a diverse polar assemblage of both biomineralized and soft-bodied organisms (the Cabrières Biota); Muir & Botting (2024) subsequently argue that exceptionally preserved non-arthropod taxa reported from this assemblage (purported sponges, algae, a worm, a hemichordate tube and a lobopod) are actually trace fossils (mostly burrows containing faecal pellets), while Saleh et al. (2024) reaffirm their original interpretation of the studied assemblage.
- The Devonian vertebrate assemblage from the Cloghnan Shale at Jemalong (New South Wales, Australia), including fossil material of Metaxygnathus, is interpreted as more likely Givetian–Frasnian than Famennian in age by Young (2024).
- Triques & Christoffersen (2024) argue that the functional vertebrate neck is not an adaptation for land, but rather is a result of progressive shortening of the rear of the skull that happened before the vertebrate land invasion.
- Knecht et al. (2024) report the discoveries of a diverse assemblage of body and trace fossils of plants, invertebrates and vertebrates living approximately 320–318 million years ago from the Lantern North site (Wamsutta Formation; Massachusetts, United States), including some of the oldest records of non-cryptogam gall damage and insect oviposition reported to date.
- Faure-Brac et al. (2024) study the size of the primary vascular canals in early amniotes and non-amniote tetrapods, interpreted as a proxy for the size of red blood cells and for thermophysiology of the studied taxa, and argue that amniotes were ancestrally ectotherms, with different amniote group evolving endothermy independently.
- Review of the anatomy, function and evolution of the temporal region of the skull in extant and extinct tetrapods is published by Abel & Werneburg (2024).
- A study on the bone loss in the skulls of tetrapods throughout their evolutionary history is published by Kean et al. (2024).
- A study on the formation of tetrapod skull during ontogeny and on the impact of external forces on the formation of the skulls of tetrapods, based on data from skulls of Parotosuchus helgolandicus, Anthracosaurus russelli, Euparkeria capensis and Protoceratops andrewsi, is published by Werneburg (2024).
- The first vertebrate body fossils from the Carboniferous–Permian Maroon Formation (Colorado, United States) are described by Huttenlocker et al. (2024).
- Evidence from strata from the Permian–Triassic transition from southwest China, interpreted as indicative of temporal decoupling of the terrestrial and marine extinctions in Permian tropics during the Permian–Triassic extinction event and of a protracted terrestrial extinction spanning approximately 1 million years, is presented by Wu et al. (2024).
- Evidence interpreted as indicative of two-stage pattern of the end-Permian extinction of the deep water organisms from the Dongpan Section (Guangxi, China), likely related to the upward and downward expansion of an oxygen minimum zone in the studied area, is presented by He et al. (2024).
- A study on the extinction selectivity of marine animals during the Permian–Triassic extinction event is published by Song et al. (2024), who find that animal groups with hemoglobin and hemocyanin were less affected by the extinction than animals with hemerythrin or relying on diffusion of oxygen.
- Liu et al. (2024) study the extinction selectivity of six marine animal groups during the Permian–Triassic extinction event, finding evidence of selective loss of complex and ornamented forms among ammonites, brachiopods and ostracods, but not bivalves, gastropods and conodonts.
- Zhou et al. (2024) report the discovery of a new Early Triassic fossil assemblage dominated by ammonites and arthropods (the Wangmo biota) from the Luolou Formation (China), interpreted as evidence of the presence of a complex marine ecosystem that was rebuilt after the Permian–Triassic extinction event.
- A study on the fossil record of Early Triassic conodonts and palynomorphs from the Vikinghøgda Formation (Svalbard, Norway), providing evidence of a shift from lycophyte-dominated to a gymnosperm-dominated vegetation related to the onset of a cooling episode, as well evidence indicating that temperature wasn't the main regulator for the distribution of segminate conodonts in the Early Triassic, is published by Leu et al. (2024).
- Revision of the fossil record of the Triassic tetrapods from Russia is published by Shishkin et al. (2024).
- Klein et al. (2024) report the discovery of a new locality in the Holbrook Member of the Moenkopi Formation (Anisian; Arizona, United States), likely representing the most extensive Middle Triassic tetrapod tracksite in North America reported to date.
- Simms & Drost (2024) interpret Triassic caves within Carboniferous limestone outcrops in south-west Britain as Carnian in age, and consider terrestrial vertebrate fossils preserved in those caves to be Carnian or at least significantly pre-Rhaetian in age.
- Campo et al. (2024) describe fossil material of Carnian tetrapods from the Faixa Nova-Cerrito I site, and evaluate its implications for the knowledge of the biostratigraphy of the Brazilian Upper Triassic record.
- A study on the femoral histology of amniotes from the Triassic Ischigualasto Formation (Argentina) is published by Curry Rogers et al. (2024), who find that early dinosaurs known from this formation grew at least as quickly as sauropodomorph and theropod dinosaurs from the later Mesozoic, and that their elevated growth rates did not set them apart from other amniotes living at the same time.
- Qvarnström et al. (2024) reconstruct food webs from five tetrapod communities from the Late Triassic and Early Jurassic of Poland on the basis of data from bromalites, and interpret changes in bromalite morphologies and their contents as related to shifts in faunal composition, with increased abundance of dinosaurs coinciding with decline of formerly dominant tetrapod groups, and with the greatest reduction in diversity of Triassic tetrapod groups such as phytosaurs, rauisuchians, aetosaurs and dicynodonts happening during the Norian-Rhaetian transition; the authors also interpret their findings as indicating that early herbivorous dinosaurs had different feeding habits than dicynodonts and aetosaurs, and interpret the studied fossils as recording stepwise rise of dinosaurs to supremacy across 30 million years of evolution.
- A study on the Hettangian and Sinemurian benthic marine communities from southern Germany, providing evidence of changes of the faunal composition of the studied communities likely associated with the recovery from the Triassic–Jurassic extinction event, is published by Kropf, Jäger & Hautmann (2024).
- A new fossil assemblage (the Yuzhou Biota), providing evidence of the presence of a trophically complex lacustrine ecosystem including diversified aquatic vertebrates, is reported from the Sinemurian Dongyuemiao Member of the Ziliujing Formation (Chongqing, China) by Ren et al. (2024).
- Dunhill et al. (2024) study the impact of the Early Toarcian Extinction Event on the marine communities from the Cleveland Basin (Yorkshire, United Kingdom), and report evidence indicative of secondary extinction cascades after the primary extinctions, as well as evidence indicating that diversity and ecosystem structure took up to 7 million years to return to pre-extinction levels.
- Taphonomic revision of Jurassic marine reptile fossils from the Rosso Ammonitico Veronese (Italy) is published by Serafini et al. (2024), who find similarities between the studied fossil material and modern whale falls in pelagic-bathyal zones, and interpret those similarities as consistent with a bathyal, deep-water interpretation of the Rosso Ammonitico Veronese depositional setting.
- A study on patterns of diversity changes of Late Jurassic tetrapods from the Morrison Formation through time and space is published by Maidment (2024).
- Aouraghe et al. (2024) report the discovery of a new fossiliferous locality from the Tithonian–Berriasian interval of the Anoual Syncline (Morocco), preserving remains of plants and aquatic reptiles, and interpret the taxonomic composition of the studied assemblage as similar to the composition of contemporaneous Laurasian assemblages, potentially indicating that Laurasian and Gondwanan biotas diverged after the Jurassic-Cretaceous transition.
- Blake et al. (2024) describe assemblages of vertebrate remains (dominated by sharks, bony fishes and crocodyliforms) from two localities from the London–Brabant Massif (Lower Greensand; United Kingdom), including the youngest occurrences of Vectiselachos gosslingi and V. ornatus reported to date, as well as including remains of at least five cartilaginous fish taxa interpreted as likely reworked from the underlying Jurassic or Wealden strata.
- Evidence from the Lower Cretaceous Xiagou Formation (China), interpreted as indicative of the existence of methane-fueled pelagic food webs across the Selli Event (with expansion of both methanogens and methane-oxidizing bacteria during the event), is presented by Sun et al. (2024).
- Revision of trace fossils from the deposits of the Aptian-Cenomanian Dakota Group along the Colorado Front Range (Colorado, United States) is published by Oligmueller & Hasiotis (2024).
- Evidence from calcareous nannofossils and small foraminifera from the Transylvanian Basin (Romania), interpreted as indicative of the appearance of a diverse continental vertebrate faunal assemblage on Hațeg Island by the second half of the late Campanian, presence of kogaionid multituberculates in the earliest known Hațeg faunas, and post-Campanian arrival of hadrosauroids and titanosaur sauropods on the island, is presented by Bălc et al. (2024).
- A study on the body size evolution of Mesozoic dinosaurs (including birds) and mammaliaforms is published by Wilson et al. (2024), who find no evidence that Bergmann's rule applied to the studied taxa.
- Sarr et al. (2024) describe Maastrichtian micro- and macrofossils from a new locality from the Cap de Naze Formation, including fossil material of the first Cretaceous dyrosaurid from Senegal.
- Otero (2024) reviews two assemblages of marine vertebrates from the Maastrichtian strata from the Arauco Basin (Chile), including remains of cartilaginous fishes, sea turtles (including the first record of Mesodermochelys outside Japan), plesiosaurs and mosasaurs, and providing evidence of diversity changes throughout the Maastrichtian.
- Boles et al. (2024) describe a new assemblage of vertebrate microfossils from the Cretaceous-Paleogene transition from the Hornerstown Formation (New Jersey, United States), providing evidence of slow recovery of elasmobranchs and ray-finned fish after the Cretaceous–Paleogene extinction event.
- Fossil material of a reef biota that survived the Cretaceous–Paleogene extinction event, including scleractinian corals and domical and bulbous growth forms which might be fossils of calcified sponges, is described from the Maastrichtian and Paleocene strata from the Adriatic islands Brač and Hvar (Croatia) by Martinuš et al. (2024).
- A study on changes of the diversity of ostracods from the Indo-Australian Archipelago region throughout the Cenozoic, aiming to determine factors responsible for recorded changes, is published by Tian et al. (2024), who argue that the studied region became the richest marine biodiversity hotspot mostly as a result of immunity to major extinction events during the Cenozoic, shift towards colder climate and the increase in habitat size (shelf area).
- Smith et al. (2024) provide an updated list of taxa documented from the Messel pit (Germany) and study the biodiversity of this site.
- Brandoni et al. (2024) describe new vertebrate remains from the Miocene Ituzaingó Formation (Entre Ríos Province, Argentina), including the oldest record of the genus Leptodactylus and remains of a member of the genus Chelonoidis representing the first record of a tortoise from the late Miocene of the Entre Ríos Province.
- A study on the environment of the Quebrada Honda Basin (Bolivia) during the late Middle Miocene is published by Strömberg et al. (2024), who report evidence of the presence of a mosaic landscape with two broad vegetation types (probable forests and open-habitat grasses) representing distinct plant communities within a broader biome, as well as evidence of variability of mammal abundances among well-sampled local areas and stratigraphic intervals.
- New Miocene and Pleistocene vertebrate assemblages are described from the Sin Charoen sandpit (Nakhon Ratchasima province, Thailand) by Naksri et al. (2024), who interpret the Pleistocene assemblage as having strong faunal relationships with the Early-Middle Pleistocene faunas of Java (Indonesia).
- A study on the fossil record of the Mediterranean marine biota from the Tortonian-Zanclean, providing evidence of changes in the taxonomic diversity indicative of disruption and reorganization of the ecosystem that began even before the Messinian salinity crisis and resulted from climate cooling and the basin's restriction from the Atlantic Ocean, is published by Agiadi et al. (2024).
- A study on the biodiversity changes associated with the Messinian salinity crisis, as indicated by the Mediterranean fossil record, is published by Agiadi et al. (2024).
- Tattersfield et al. (2024) study the ecological associations of extant terrestrial gastropods from the Laetoli-Endulen area (Tanzania) and compare them with Pliocene gastropod assemblages from Laetoli, interpreting gastropods from the Lower Laetolil beds as indicative of semi-arid environment, those from the Upper Laetolil Beds as indicative of a mosaic of forest, woodland and bushland habitats, and gastropods from the Upper Ndolanya Beds as indicative of humid environment.
- Ramírez-Pedraza et al. (2024) report evidence from the Guefaït-4 fossil site (Morocco) indicative of the presence of a mosaic landscape with open grasslands, forested areas, wetlands and seasonal aridity close to the Pliocene-Pleistocene transition, which might have facilitated the dispersal of mammals (including hominins) from central or eastern Africa to northern Africa.
- A study on changes of the composition of the Caribbean frugivore communities throughout the Quaternary is published by Kemp (2024).
- Antoine et al. (2024) report the discovery of fossil material from Kourou (French Guiana) providing evidence of the presence of diverse foraminifer, plant and animal communities near the equator in the 130,000-115,000 years ago time interval, as well as evidence of marine retreat and dryer conditions with a savanna-dominated landscape and episodes of fire during the onset of the Last Glacial Period.

== Other research ==
- Drabon et al. (2024) study the environmental effects of a giant meteorite impact during the Paleoarchean, based on data from the Fig Tree Formation (South Africa, and find that in short term the effects of the impact likely harmed shallow-water photosynthetic microbes, while in the medium term it provided influx of phosphorus and the injection of iron-rich deep water into shallow waters that initiated a bloom of iron-cycling microbes.
- Evidence from the study of the nitrogen isotopic composition of 2.68-billion-years-old marine sedimentary deposits of the Serra Sul Formation (Brazil), interpreted as likely resulting from oxygenic photosynthesis that predated the Great Oxidation Event, is presented by Pellerin et al. (2024).
- A study on the Paleoproterozoic seawater biogeochemical conditions in the Francevillian sub-basin (Gabon) is published by Chi Fru et al. (2024), who report evidence of enrichment of seawater with phosphorus approximately 2.1 billion years ago, of comparable magnitude to Ediacaran seawater levels that supported the rise of the Ediacaran biota, and argue that this previously unrecognized seawater nutrient enrichment initiated the emergence of the Francevillian biota.
- A study on the oxygenation of atmosphere and oceans and on marine productivity during the Neoproterozoic and Paleozoic is published by Stockey et al. (2024), who find no evidence of the wholesale oxygenation of Earth's oceans in the Neoproterozoic, but report evidence of a late Neoproterozoic increase in atmospheric oxygen and marine productivity, which likely increased oxygenation and food supply in shallow marine habitats at the time of the first radiation of major animal groups.
- Huang et al. (2024) report evidence of a period in the Ediacaran when Earth's magnetic field was weakened, lasting 26 million years, overlapping temporally with atmospheric and oceanic oxygenation and potentially causing it and ultimately allowing diversification of the Ediacara Fauna.
- 563-million-year-old horizontal markings with similarities to horizontal animal trace fossils, reported from the Itajaí Basin (Brazil), are interpreted as pseudofossils of tectonic origin by Becker Kerber et al. (2024), who propose a set of criteria which can be used to evaluate the identity of putative trace fossils.
- Evidence of links between increased continental weathering and marine transgression during the assembly of Gondwana, changes in seawater conditions and biotic turnovers during the Ediacaran-Cambrian transition is presented by Deng et al. (2024).
- Evidence of preservation of internal organs of soft-bodied organisms from the interbedded background mudstone beds of the Cambrian Yu'anshan Formation (China) as carbonaceous compressions is presented by Lei et al. (2024).
- Neuweiler et al. (2024) study the composition and structure of the stromatolite Cryptozoon from the Cambrian strata in eastern New York State, and reject claims of preservation of fossil material of non-spiculate sponges in the studied stromatolite.
- A study on the variations of preservation of animal fossils from the Ordovician Fezouata Formation (Morocco) is published by Saleh et al. (2024), who report evidence of better preservation of predators/scavengers compared to animals with other feeding strategies, as wells as evidence of better preservation of Tremadocian animals than Floian ones.
- Smelror et al. (2024) report the discovery of trace fossils of polychaetes associated with cold to temperate waters in marine deposits in the Central Norwegian Caledonides, and interpret this finding as evidence of previously unrecognized deep-ocean circulation and upwelling of cold water along the subtropical Laurentian margin of the Iapetus Ocean in the early to mid-Ordovician.
- A study on silicified fossils from the Ordovician Edinburg Formation (Virginia, United States), aiming to determine sources of potential bias in fossil recovery, is published by Jacobs et al. (2024).
- A study on the oceanic cadmium cycle during the Ordovician-Silurian transition, providing evidence that increased marine productivity resulted in increased burial of organic matter, CO_{2} drawdown and ultimately in the Hirnantian glaciation, is presented by Zhao et al. (2024).
- Purported Precambrian trace fossil Rugoinfractus ovruchensis is interpreted as mud cracks preserved in Devonian strata by Dernov (2024).
- Stacey et al. (2024) report possible evidence that Devonian and early Carboniferous oceanic oxygenation was related to the evolution of large vascular plants and the first forests, as well as evidence of susceptibility of shallow marine settings to redox instability, possibly related to extinctions and reef collapse events in the studied time interval.
- Evidence from the Bicheno-5 core in eastern Tasmania (Australia), interpreted as indicative of carbon cycle perturbations in the middle Permian, Carnian and Norian which triggered climatic and environmental changes within the Permian and Triassic Antarctic circle, is presented by Lestari et al. (2024).
- A study on mercury concentrations and isotopic compositions of limestones from the Xiongjiachang section of southwestern China is published by Huang et al. (2024), who interpret their findings as indicative of a temporal link between Emeishan Traps volcanism and the Capitanian mass extinction event.
- Evidence interpreted as indicative of strong ozone depletion of the atmosphere at the onset of the Permian–Triassic extinction event is presented by Li et al. (2024).
- A study on Permian–Triassic boundary sections in North and South China is published by Chu et al. (2024), who interpret their findings as indicating that the onset of the end-Permian terrestrial biotic crisis in North China preceded that in South China by at least 300,000 years, and that the onset of environmental changes that caused end-Permian extinctions varied regionally.
- Sun et al. (2024) argue that increase of partial pressure of carbon dioxide at the end of the Permian led to collapse of the meridional overturning circulation, contraction of the Hadley cell and intensification of El Niños, causing environmental changes that ultimately resulted in the Permian–Triassic extinction event.
- Li et al. (2024) present evidence of existence of persistently active El Niño–Southern Oscillation throughout the past 250 million years, and study the causes of variations in its amplitude throughout the studied time interval.
- Wang et al. (2024) report the discovery of a fossil forest of Neocalamites plants from the Middle Triassic Yanchang Formation (China), and interpret this finding as evidence of wide-scale intensification of the water cycle during the Triassic prior to the Carnian pluvial episode.
- A study on the lower Carnian basinal succession from the Polzberg Lagerstätte (Austria), providing evidence of deposition during the onset of the Carnian pluvial episode and of peculiar oceanographic conditions affecting the Reifling Basin at the time, is published by Lukeneder et al. (2024).
- Rigo et al. (2024) report evidence of a previously unknown oceanic anoxic event of global extent that spanned the Norian-Rhaetian transition, likely related to extinctions and diversity losses among radiolarians, bivalves, ammonites, conodonts and marine vertebrates.
- Evidence indicating that the Triassic–Jurassic extinction event coincided with the initial major pulse of Central Atlantic magmatic province volcanism is presented by Kent et al. (2024).
- Evidence from mercury anomalies and fern spores from the Lower Saxony Basin (Germany), interpreted as indicative of persistence of volcanic-induced mercury pollution after the Triassic–Jurassic extinction event resulting in high abundances of malformed fern spores during the Triassic–Jurassic transition and during the Hettangian, is presented by Bos et al. (2024).
- Evidence of global expansion of marine anoxia during the Toarcian Oceanic Anoxic Event, interpreted as indicating that anoxic waters covered ~6 to 8% of the global seafloor during the peak of the event, is presented by Remírez et al. (2024).
- Evidence from the study of trace fossils from the earliest Cretaceous Botucatu Formation (Brazil), interpreted as indicative of the presence of dry environment with episodic wet events, is presented by Peixoto et al. (2024).
- Song et al. (2024) determine the fossil strata of the Baiwan Formation (Henan, China) bearing fossils of the Jehol Biota to be approximately 123.6 million years old.
- Rangel et al. (2024) describe a vertebrate burrow from the Lower Cretaceous Três Barras Formation (Brazil), likely produced by a lungfish or a lizard, and interpret the studied formation as preserving evidence of periods of flooding in a meandering river zone in the marginal areas of the Early Cretaceous eolian setting.
- Evidence from the study of microfossils from the Lower Cretaceous Sanfranciscana Basin (Brazil), interpreted as indicative of multiple marine incursions into the continental setting of the southwest Gondwana during the Aptian, is presented by Fauth et al. (2024).
- Jacobs et al. (2024) study the geological setting of the Early Cretaceous fossiliferous basins of northern Cameroon, preserving dinosaur tracks similar to footprints found in northeastern Brazil, and determine the geographic limits and environmental setting of the land corridor that connected Africa and South America during the pre-Aptian Cretaceous and made faunal exchanges between the continents possible, termed the Borborema-Cameroon Dinosaur Dispersal Corridor by the authors.
- MacLennan et al. (2024) interpret exceptional preservation of fossils (including early birds and feathered non-avian dinosaurs) from the Lower Cretaceous Yixian Formation (China) as unlikely to be linked to violent volcanic eruptions.
- Li et al. (2024) constrain the onset of the Selli Event to approximately 119.55 million years ago, and identify the Ontong Java Plateau volcanism as a probable cause of this anoxic event.
- Evidence interpreted as indicative of impact of emergence of the coastal mountain range in eastern South China during the Early Cretaceous on Asian atmospheric circulation and precipitation patterns, prompting eastward desert expansion in Asia, is presented by Li et al. (2024).
- Woolley et al. (2024) attempt to quantify the amount of phylogenetic information available in the global fossil records of non-avian theropod dinosaurs, Mesozoic birds and squamates, and find that the studies of the phylogenic relationships of extinct animals are less affected by disproportionate representation of taxa from specific geologic units (especially Lagerstätten) in the evolutionary tree when the entire global fossil record of the studied groups, rather than just fossils from specific geologic units, preserves higher amount of phylogenetic information; the authors also find that Late Cretaceous squamate fossils from the Djadochta and Barun Goyot formations (Mongolia) provide a diproportionally large amount of phylogenetic information available in the squamate fossil record.
- Almeida et al. (2024) provide new paleocurrent measurements for the Cretaceous and Paleogene in the eastern Amazonia region, and find persistent pattern of the river flow to the East in the Amazonas Basin from the Cretaceous to the present to be more likely than a reversal from the westward river flow to the eastward one.
- Eberth (2024) revises the stratigraphic architecture of the Campanian Belly River Group (Alberta, Canada).
- Rogers et al. (2024) revise the lithostratigraphy and chronostratigraphy of the Two Medicine Formation (Montana, United States).
- Evidence of a change in nitrogen isotope ratios of the organic matter bound in Campanian and Maastrichtian fish otoliths from the East Coast of the United States, interpreted as related to expansion of oxygen-deficient zones in the ocean during the Campanian-to-Maastrichtian climate cooling, is presented by Rao et al. (2024).
- A study on the environmental conditions in the Late Cretaceous Western Interior Seaway is published by Wostbrock et al. (2024), who reconstruct δ^{18}O seawater values consistent with open ocean during greenhouse climate for the Campanian and consistent with more evaporative conditions for the Maastrichtian.
- Evidence of a short-term (lasting less than 10,000 years) cooling event beginning approximately 30,000 years before the Cretaceous-Paleogene transition, interpreted as likely related to Deccan volcanism, is presented by O'Connor et al. (2024).
- New data interpreted as supporting an impact origin of the Nadir crater is provided by Nicholson et al. (2024).
- Evidence from the study of ruthenium isotopes in the impact deposits from the Chicxulub crater, interpreted as indicating that the impactor that produced the crater was a carbonaceous asteroid that formed beyond the orbit of Jupiter, is presented by Fischer-Gödde et al. (2024).
- During et al. (2024) reeavualute data from analyses of fossil fish remains from the Tanis fossil site (North Dakota, United States) performed by DePalma et al. (2021), originally presented as evidence indicating that the end-Cretaceous Chicxulub impact occurred during boreal Spring/Summer, and report anomalies interpreted by the authors as unlikely to be the result of analytical work.
- Evidence indicating that, in spite of high global temperatures, oxygen availability in the waters of the tropical North Pacific actually rose during the Paleocene–Eocene Thermal Maximum, is presented by Moretti et al. (2024), who argue that this oxygen rise in the ocean might have prevented a mass extinction during the Paleocene–Eocene Thermal Maximum.
- Crespo & Goin (2024) argue that a biogeographical barrier (called the Weddell Line by the authors) existed between East and West Antarctica during early Paleogene times and prevented eutherian mammals from reaching Australia from South America.
- Evidence indicating that West Antarctica's Pacific margin was not covered by West Antarctic Ice Sheet during the Early Oligocene Glacial Maximum is presented by Klages et al. (2024).
- A study on body mass, tooth wear and functional traits of teeth of mammalian herbivores from the Miocene to Pleistocene strata from the Falcón Basin (Venezuela), interpreted as indicative of a gradual decline in precipitation and tree cover in the environment of the studied mammals since the late Miocene, is published by Wilson et al. (2024), who argue that such data from mammal remains can be used of paleoenvironmental reconstructions at other South American localities.
- Yu et al. (2024) provide new age estimates for the Aves Cave and Milo's Cave deposits (Bolt's Farm cave complex in the Cradle of Humankind, South Africa), and argue that there are no definitive examples of cave deposits in the Cradle of Humankind that are older than 3.2 million years.
- Bierman et al. (2024) report the discovery of insect, plant and fungal remains collected from below 3 km of ice at Summit, Greenland, providing evidence of ice-free, tundra environment in central Greenland during the Pleistocene.
- Butiseacă et al. (2024) report evidence from the Pleistocene Marathousa 1 (Megalopolis Basin, Greece) interpreted as indicative of vegetation changes related to the cooling during the Marine Isotope Stage 12, as indicating that the studied area was a refugium during the MIS 12 glaciation and that the hominin presence at the site was associated with the end of the MIS 12 glacial maximum.
- Evidence of change in fire regime in northern Australia that happened at least 11,000 years ago, resulting in fires becoming more frequent but less intense and interpreted as resulting from Indigenous fire management, is presented by Bird et al. (2024).
- Uhl et al. (2024) review known record of maar and other volcanogenic lake fossil sites ranging from the Cretaceous period to the Pliocene.
- Evidence from the study of tests of Miocene Ammonia, indicating that fossils of marine calcifiers (studied for reconstructions of deep ocean and sea-surface temperatures in the past) remain more susceptible to diagenetic isotope exchange with seawater than abiotic calcites even millions of years after sedimentation and burial, is presented by Cisneros-Lazaro et al. (2024).
- Wiseman, Charles & Hutchinson (2024) compare multiple reconstructions of the musculature of Australopithecus afarensis, evaluating the capability of different models to maintain an upright, single-support limb posture, and find that models which are otherwise identical might be either able or unable support the body posed on an extended limb solely as a result of changing the input architectural parameters and including or excluding an elastic tendon.
- Sullivan et al. (2024) argue that the process of generating rigorous reconstructions of extinct animals can lead to fresh inferences about the anatomy of the studied animals, and support their claims with examples from dinosaur paleontology.
- Gayford et al. (2024) review problems that affect body size estimations of extinct animals that use extant animals as proxies, and propose precautionary measures that can address these problems.
- Wright, Cavanaugh & Pierce (2024) compare the accuracy of two body mass estimation methods in extant tetrapods, and apply the compared methods to a sample of Permian and Triassic tetrapods including Eryops megacephalus, Diadectes tenuitectus, Orobates pabsti, Bradysaurus baini, Edaphosaurus boanerges, Ophiacodon uniformis, Dimetrodon milleri, Tapinocaninus pamelae, Dinodontosaurus turpior, Lisowicia bojani, Scaloposaurus constrictus and Procynosuchus delaharpeae.
- Didier & Laurin (2024) propose a new model-based approach which can be used to study the diversification of fossil taxa, and apply it to the fossil record of ophiacodontids, edaphosaurids and sphenacodontids, finding evidence that the diversification of the studied synapsids slowed down around the Asselian/Sakmarian transition but no evidence of a late Sakmarian or Artinskian extinction event, and interpreting Olson's Extinction as a protracted decline in biodiversity over 20 million years rather than a rapid extinction event.
- Cooper, Flannery-Sutherland & Silvestro (2024) present a deep learning approach which can be used to estimate biodiversity through time from the incomplete fossil record, and use this approach to estimate global biodiversity dynamics of marine animals from the Late Permian to Early Jurassic and proboscideans.
- Hauffe, Cantalapiedra & Silvestro (2024) present a Bayesian model that can be used to determine diversification dynamics from fossil occurrence data and apply it to the fossil record of proboscideans.
- Benoit (2024) interprets the painting of an unidentified animal with two enlarged tusks from the Horned Serpent panel in the Koesberg mountains (South Africa), dated between 1821 and 1835, as possible evidence that the San people discovered dicynodont fossils before the scientific description of the first known dicynodont.
- Reumer (2024) hypothesizes that Beringer's Lying Stones represent the first recorded case of an intentional paleontological fraud in history, and might have been perpetrated by Johann Beringer himself.

=== Paleoclimate ===
- A multibillion-year history of seawater δ^{18}O, temperature, and marine and terrestrial clay abundance is reconstructed by Isson & Rauzi (2024), who report evidence interpreted as indicative of temperate Proterozoic climate, and evidence indicating that declines in clay authigenesis coincided with Paleozoic and Cenozoic cooling, the expansion of siliceous life, and the radiation of land plants.
- Judd et al. (2024) present a reconstruction of the global mean surface temperature over the past 485 million years, and report evidence of constant change of global mean surface temperature of approximately 8°C in response to a doubling of CO_{2} in the studied time interval, whether the climate was warm or cold.
- Evidence from the study of the Ordovician carbonate record from the Baltic Basin, interpreted as indicative of lower values of oxygen isotopic composition of Ordovician seawater than estimated in earlier studies, is presented by Thiagarajan et al. (2024), who interpret their findings as justifying reassessmeny of climate records based on oxygen isotopes.
- A study on Lower Triassic marine shales and cherts, providing evidence of enhanced reverse weathering which might have contributed to the persistence of elevated temperatures in the aftermath of the Permian–Triassic extinction event, is published by Rauzi et al. (2024).
- Gurung et al. (2024) use a new vegetation and climate model to study links between plant geographical range, the long-term carbon cycle and climate, and find that reduced geographical range of plants in Pangaea resulted in increased atmospheric CO_{2} concentration during the Triassic and Jurassic periods, while the expande geographical range of plants after the breakup of Pangaea amplified global CO_{2} removal.
- A study on the geochemistry of Jurassic deposits of the External Rif Chain (Morocco), providing evidence of climate changes in northwest Gondwana during the Jurassic period (from cool climate with low rainfall and productivity during the Early Jurassic, to moister, warmer climate during the Middle and Late Jurassic, subsequently returning to arid and cool climate during the Late Jurassic), is published by Kairouani et al. (2024).
- Evidence indicating that small to large ice sheets were present in Antarctica throughout much of the Early Cretaceous, briefly melting in response to episodic volcanism, is presented by Nordt, Breecker & White (2024).
- A study on calcite from Early Cretaceous belemnite rostra from the Mahajanga Basin (Madagascar), providing evidence of the Valanginian cooling event in the Southern Hemisphere, is published by Wang et al. (2024).
- Evidence interpreted as indicative of a link between ocean deoxygenation during the Early Cretaceous Selli Event, volcanic CO_{2} emissions and the crossing of an associated climate threshold is presented by Bauer et al. (2024).
- Evidence from oxygen isotope values of shell material of Late Cretaceous ammonites from the Western Interior Seaway, interpreted as indicative of ~18 °C cooling from the Cretaceous Thermal Maximum in the Turonian until the late Maastrichtian, is presented by McCraw et al. (2024).
- A study on the environmental conditions of the Foremost Formation (Alberta, Canada) during the Campanian is published by Thompson et al. (2024).
- Evidence from the study of late Paleocene and early Eocene planktic foraminifera from the Pacific Ocean, interpreted as indicative of strong coupling between atmospheric CO_{2} and sea surface temperature over the long- and short-term in the studied time interval, is presented by Harper et al. (2024).
- Evidence from the study of the middle Cenozoic palynological records across the United Kingdom and Ireland, interpreted as overall indicative of temperate climate in the studied time interval but also as indicative of short-lived appearances of the tropical rainforest during the Priabonian or Rupelian and during the late Oligocene warming event, is presented by McCoy et al. (2024).
- Clark et al. (2024) present a new reconstruction of global temperature changes over the past 4.5 million years, interpreted as consistent with changes in the carbon cycle.
- Amarathunga et al. (2024) present evidence indicative of a humid period in North Africa lasting from 3.8 to 3.3 million years ago, possibly sustaining persistent green corridors that facilitated early hominin connectivity and migration.
- An et al. (2024) present evidence indicating that growth of the Antarctic ice sheets from 2 to 1.25 million years ago preceded and likely induced expansion of ice sheets of the Northern Hemisphere after 1.25 million years ago.

== Deaths ==
- Estella Leopold, paleobotanist and conservation paleontologist passes on February 25, 2024 at 97. Leopold's work as a conservationist included taking legal action to help save the Florissant Fossil Beds in Colorado, and fighting pollution. She was the daughter of Aldo Leopold.
