= Thielechinus =

Thielechinus Temporal range: Famennian

Scientific classification
- Kingdom: Animalia
- Phylum: Echinodermata
- Class: Echinoidea
- Family: Proterocidaridae
- Genus: Thielechinus; Pauly & Haude, 2024
- Species: T. multiserialis

Binomial name
- Thielechinus multiserialis Pauly & Haude, 2024

Extinct genus of sea urchins

Thielechinus is an extinct genus of proterocidarid sea urchins that inhabited what is now Germany during the Famennian stage of the Late Devonian epoch. It is known from a single species, T. multiserialis.
