= Afanasjevispirifer =

Scientific classification
- Kingdom: Animalia
- Phylum: Brachiopoda
- Class: Rhynchonellata
- Order: †Spiriferida
- Family: †Delthyrididae
- Subfamily: †Howellellinae
- Genus: †Afanasjevispirifer; Baranov & Nikolaev, 2024

Extinct genus of Brachiopods

Afanasjevispirifer is an extinct genus of spiriferid brachiopods in the family Delthyrididae. It was described alongside the related Talyndzhaspirifer in Russia in 2024.
