= Ramphoprionidae =

Ramphoprionidae Temporal range: Ordovician(or earlier?) - Silurian (or later?)

Scientific classification
- Kingdom: Animalia
- Phylum: Annelida
- Clade: Pleistoannelida
- Subclass: Errantia
- Order: Eunicida
- Family: †Ramphoprionidae; Kielan-Jaworowska, 1966

Extinct family of annelid worms

Ramphoprionidae is a family of polychaete worms known from the Ordovician and Silurian periods.
