= Nalivkinathyris =

Nalivkinathyris Temporal range: Famennian

Scientific classification
- Kingdom: Animalia
- Phylum: Brachiopoda
- Class: Rhynchonellata
- Order: †Athyridida
- Genus: †Nalivkinathyris
- Species: †N. damganensis

Binomial name
- †Nalivkinathyris damganensis Baranov et al., 2025

Extinct genus of brachiopods

Nalivkinathyris is an extinct genus of athyridid brachiopod that lived during the Famennian stage of the Devonian period.

== Distribution ==
Nalivkinathyris damganensis fossils are known from Upper Famennian strata in the Khoshyeilagh Formation in the Alborz Mountains of Iran.
