= Talyndzhaspirifer =

Scientific classification
- Kingdom: Animalia
- Phylum: Brachiopoda
- Class: Rhynchonellata
- Order: †Spiriferida
- Family: †Delthyrididae
- Subfamily: †Howellellinae
- Genus: †Talyndzhaspirifer; Valeryi, 2024

Type species
- †Talyndzhaspirifer latus Valeryi, 2024

Extinct genus of Brachiopods

Talyndzhaspirifer is a genus of spiriferid brachiopods in the family Delthyrididae, subfamily Howellellinae. It was described alongside the related Afanasjevispirifer in Russia in 2024.
