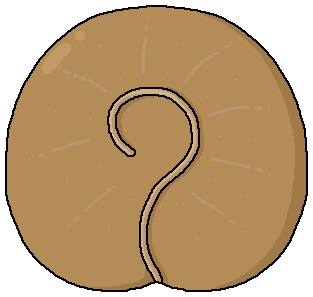
- Reconstruction of Quaestio simpsonorum.

Scientific classification
- Kingdom: Animalia
- Genus: †Quaestio; Evans et al., 2024
- Species: †Q. simpsonorum

Binomial name
- †Quaestio simpsonorum Evans et al., 2024

= Quaestio (genus) =

Quaestio Temporal range: Ediacaran 565 Ma

Genus of Ediacaran animal

Quaestio is an early motile marine animal which lived 555 million years ago in the Upper Ediacaran. It is the earliest known animal to bear evidence of left-right asymmetry. The type species is Q. simpsonorum.

== Discovery and name ==
Fossil material of Quaestio was discovered in Southern Australia in 2024, from the Ediacara Member at Nilpena Ediacara National Park. At least four trace fossils were discovered as well, some a few centimeters behind the death-mask of the maker, and some without their maker present, showing that the animal was capable of movement, which direction it moved and its anterior and posterior regions.

The generic name Quaestio is derived directly from the Latin word quaestio, meaning "question", in reference to the shape of the central ridge. The specific name simpsonorum is the Latinisation of the surname of philanthropists Mary Lou and Antony Simpson, in honor of their contributions to the research and conservation of Ediacaran fossil materials.

== Description ==
Quaestio has a near smooth circular margin, broken by a V-shaped notch at the posterior end of the animal. In the center sits the main ridge, which forms a question mark-like shape, with secondary ridges sitting between the main ridge and the outer margin. Quaestio can range in sizes of 3 cm to 8 cm in overall diameter, with the main ridge being 60% of the length of the body.
