= Whittaker Formation =

Stratigraphic Unit in Northwest Territories, Canada

- Stratigraphic range: Silurian
- Type: Formation

Location
- Region: Northwest Territories
- Country: Canada

The Whittaker Formation is a geologic formation in Northwest Territories, Canada. It preserves fossils dating back to the Silurian period.

== See also ==
- List of fossiliferous stratigraphic units in Northwest Territories
