= List of chitinozoan genera =

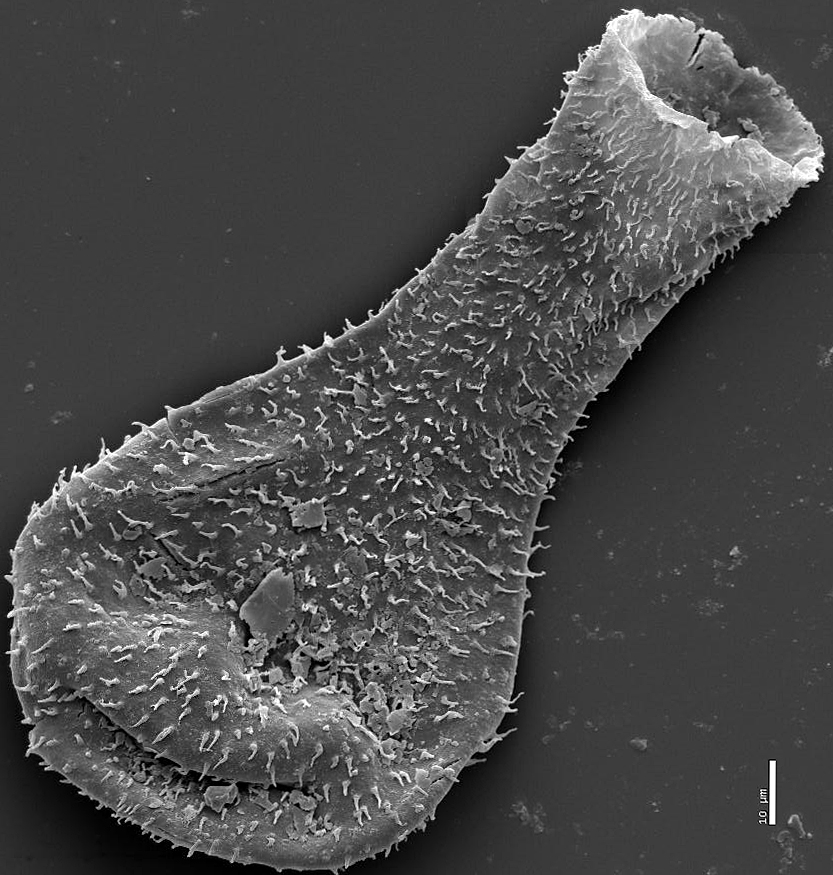
A Chitinozoan (Sphaerochitina cf. diezae) from the late Silurian Burgsvik beds, Gotland, Sweden, prepared by dissolution in HF acid.

This list of chitinozoan genera is an attempt to create a comprehensive listing of all genera that have ever been included in the Chitinozoa. This list excludes purely vernacular terms. It includes all commonly accepted genera, but also genera that are now considered invalid, doubtful (nomina dubia), or were not formally published (nomina nuda), as well as junior synonyms of more established names, and genera that are no longer considered acanthodians.

== Naming conventions and terminology ==
Naming conventions and terminology follow the International Code of Zoological Nomenclature. Technical terms used include:

- Junior synonym: A name which describes the same taxon as a previously published name. If two or more genera are formally designated and the type specimens are later assigned to the same genus, the first to be published (in chronological order) is the senior synonym, and all other instances are junior synonyms. Senior synonyms are generally used, except by special decision of the ICZN, but junior synonyms cannot be used again, even if deprecated. Junior synonymy is often subjective, unless the genera described were both based on the same type specimen.
- Nomen nudum (Latin for "naked name"): A name that has appeared in print but has not yet been formally published by the standards of the ICZN. Nomina nuda (the plural form) are invalid, and are therefore not italicized as a proper generic name would be. If the name is later formally published, that name is no longer a nomen nudum and will be italicized on this list. Often, the formally published name will differ from any nomina nuda that describe the same specimen.
- Nomen oblitum (Latin for "forgotten name"): A name that has not been used in the scientific community for more than fifty years after its original proposal.
- Preoccupied name: A name that is formally published, but which has already been used for another taxon. This second use is invalid (as are all subsequent uses) and the name must be replaced. As preoccupied names are not valid generic names, they will also go unitalicized on this list.
- Nomen dubium (Latin for "dubious name"): A name describing a fossil with no unique diagnostic features. As this can be an extremely subjective and controversial designation, this term is not used on this list.

Contents:	A B C D E F G H I J K L M N O P Q R S T U V W X Y Z — See also

== Chitinozoan genera ==
Genus	Status	Order	Family	Subfamily	Description	Images
*Acanthochitina	Valid.	Prosomatifera	Conochitinidae	Belonechitininae		
*Alpenachitina	Valid.	Prosomatifera	Lagenochitinidae	Ancyrochitininae		
*Amphorachitina	Valid.					
*Ancyrochitina	Valid.	Prosomatifera	Lagenochitinidae	Ancyrochitininae		
*Angochitina	Valid.	Prosomatifera	Lagenochitinidae	Angochitininae		
*Anthochitina	Valid.	Prosomatifera	Lagenochitinidae	Cyathochitininae		
*Belonechitina	Valid.	Prosomatifera	Conochitinidae	Belonechitininae		
*Bursachitina	Valid.	Operculatifera	Desmochitinidae	Desmochitininae		
*Calpichtina	Valid.	Operculatifera	Desmochitinidae	Desmochitininae		
*Cingulochitina	Valid.	Operculatifera	Desmochitinidae	Petrochitininae		
*Cladochitina	Valid.					
*Clathrochitina	Valid.	Prosomatifera	Lagenochitinidae	Ancyrochitininae		
*Clavachitina	Valid.	Prosomatifera	Conochitinidae	Conochitininae		
*Conochitina	Valid.	Prosomatifera	Conochitinidae	Conochitininae		
*Coronochitina	Valid.					
*Cyathochitina	Valid.	Prosomatifera	Lagenochitinidae	Cyathochitininae		
*Cylindrochitina	Valid.					
*Desmochitina	Valid.	Operculatifera	Desmochitinidae	Desmochitininae		
*Earlachitina	Valid.					
*Eisenackitina	Valid.	Operculatifera	Desmochitinidae	Eisenachitininae		
*Eremochitina	Valid.	Prosomatifera	Conochitinidae	Eremochitininae		
*Euconochitina	Valid.	Prosomatifera	Conochitinidae	Conochitininae		
*Fungochitina	Valid.	Prosomatifera	Lagenochitinidae	Angochitininae		
*Fustichitina	Valid.					
*Gotlandochitina	Valid.					
*Halochitina	Valid.	Operculatifera	Desmochitinidae	Pterochitininae		
*Hercochitina	Valid.	Prosomatifera	Conochitinidae	Belonechitininae		
*Hetcochitina	Valid.					
*Hoegisphaera	Valid.	Operculatifera	Desmochitinidae	Desmochitininae		
*Kalochitina	Valid.	Operculatifera	Desmochitinidae	Eisenachitininae		
*Lagenochitina	Valid.	Prosomatifera	Lagenochitinidae	Lagenochitininae		
*Linochitina	Valid.	Operculatifera	Desmochitinidae	Margachitininae		
*Margachitina	Valid.	Operculatifera	Desmochitinidae	Margachitininae		
*Muscochitina	Valid.	Prosomatifera	Lagenochitinidae	Angochitininae		
*Parisochitina	Valid.	Prosomatifera	Lagenochitinidae	Cyathochitininae		
*Pistillachitina	Valid.	Prosomatifera	Conochitinidae	Conochitininae		
*Plectochitina	Valid.	Prosomatifera	Lagenochitinidae	Ancyrochitininae		
*Pogonochitina	Valid.	Prosomatifera	Conochitinidae	Pogochitininae		
*Pseudoclathrochitina	Valid.	Operculatifera	Desmochitinidae	Petrochitininae		
*Pterochitina	Valid.	Operculatifera	Desmochitinidae	Petrochitininae		
*Ramochitina	Valid.	Prosomatifera	Lagenochitinidae	Angochitininae		
*Rhabdochitina	Valid.	Prosomatifera	Conochitinidae	Conochitininae		
*Ollachitina	Valid.	Operculatifera	Desmochitinidae	Desmochitininae		
*Sagenachitina	Valid.	Prosomatifera	Lagenochitinidae	Cyathochitininae		
*Salopochitina	Valid.	Operculatifera	Desmochitinidae	Orbichitininae		
*Siphonochitina	Valid.	Prosomatifera	Conochitinidae	Eremochitininae		
*Sphaerochitina	Valid.	Prosomatifera	Lagenochitinidae	Lagenochitininae		
*Spinachitina	Valid.	Prosomatifera	Conochitinidae	Spinachitininae		
*Tanuchitina	Valid.	Prosomatifera	Conochitinidae	Tanuchitininae		
*Urochitina	Valid.	Prosomatifera	Lagenochitinidae	Urochitininae		
*Velatachitina	Valid.	Prosomatifera	Conochitinidae	Velatachitininae		
