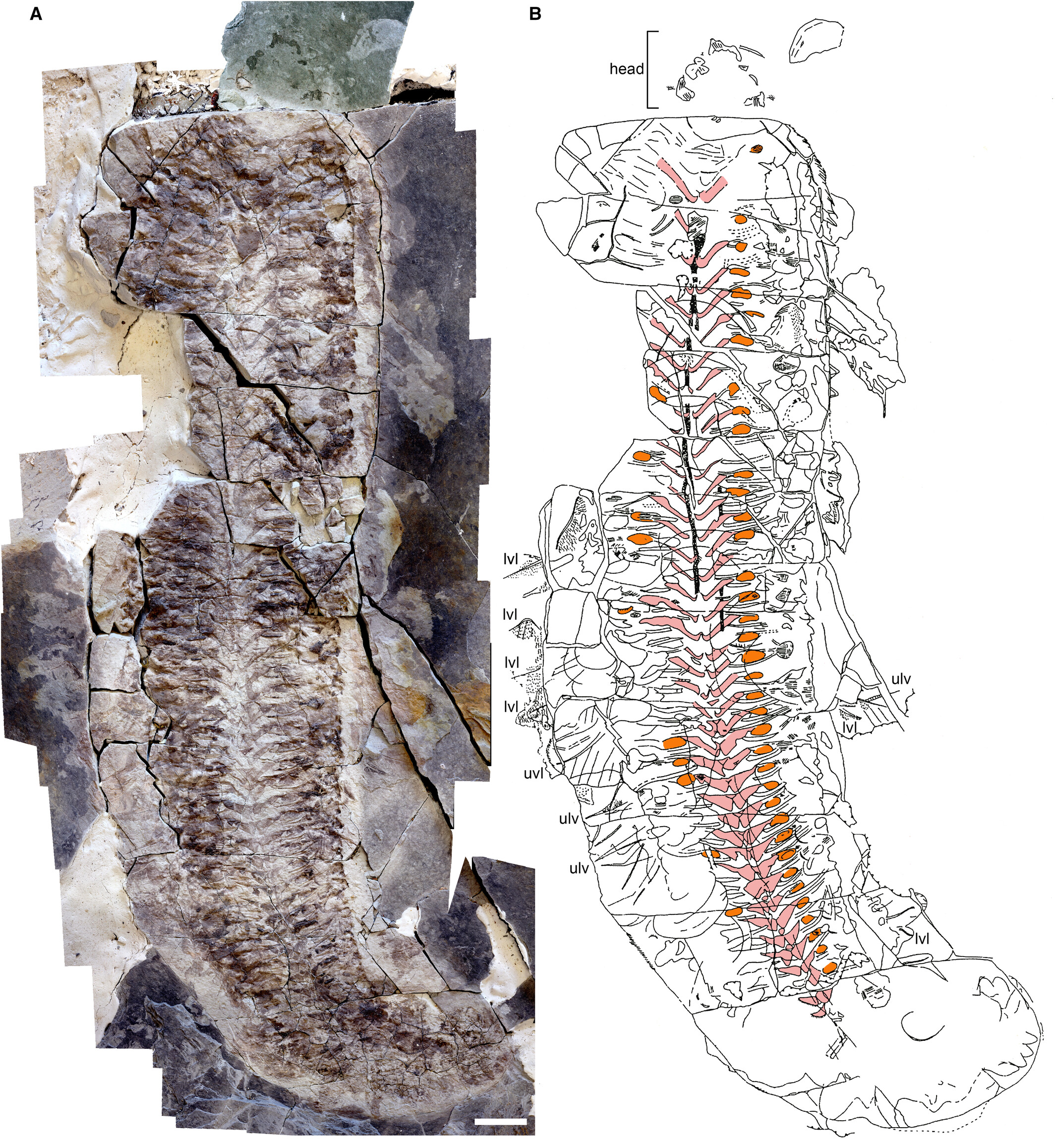
- Holotype specimen

Scientific classification
- Kingdom: Animalia
- Phylum: Arthropoda
- Class: incertae sedis
- Genus: †Keurbos; Gabbott et al., 2025
- Species: †K. susanae

Binomial name
- †Keurbos susanae Gabbott et al., 2025

= Keurbos =

Keurbos Temporal range: Late Ordovician (Hirnantian)

Extinct genus of enigmatic arthropods

Keurbos is an extinct genus of enigmatic arthropods from the latest Ordovician (Hirnantian) Soom Shale of South Africa, a Lagerstätten fossil site within the larger Cederberg Formation. The genus contains a single species, Keurbos susanae. It is known from two specimens, one nearly complete and the other a partial body. These specimens, while preserving the internal organs extremely well, barely preserve the exoskeleton. At about 43 centimetres (17 in) long, Keurbos is a large arthropod. Its trunk has 46 segments that decrease in size toward the rear. Its exact phylogenetic placement in relation to other arthropods is uncertain due to the poor preservation of the head and limbs. Keurbos inhabited a cold ocean basin, having lived right after a major glaciation.

== Discovery and naming ==
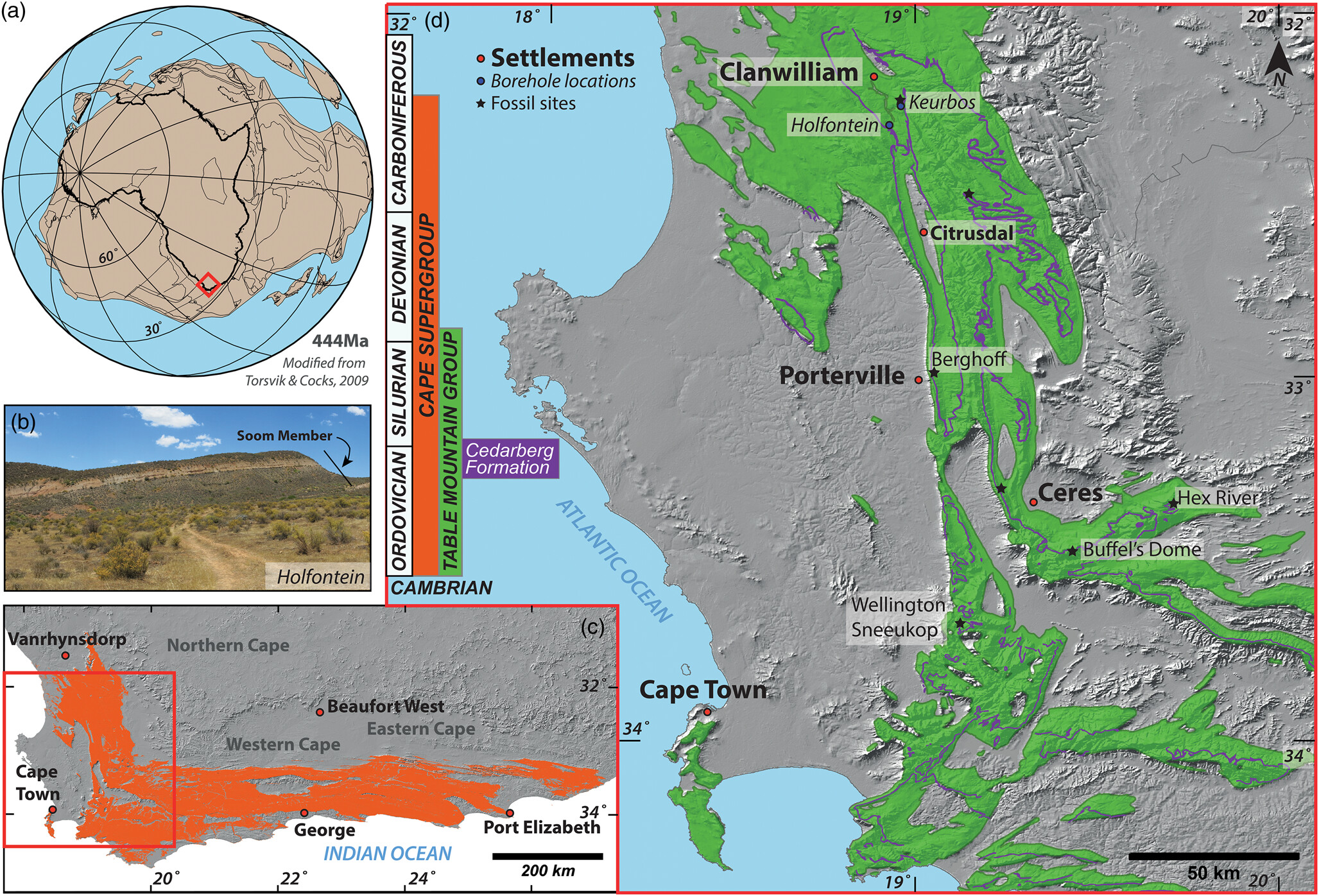
The wider Table Mountain Group which the Soom Shale is part of, alongside a palaeogeographical reconstruction of the time it was deposited

The Keurbos holotype specimen, C1002, is a well-preserved specimen missing the carapace, legs, and most of its head but preserving soft organs. The paratype, C2044, is a less complete partial body missing the front and back. Both part and counterpart of the two specimens are preserved, with head anatomy being obtained from the holotype's counterpart. These specimens were discovered in the Soom Shale (Cederberg Formation) of South Africa by University of Leicester professor Sarah Gabbott in an expedition around 2000, who nicknamed the species "Sue". The informal name "Keurbosia" was used in reference to this species in artwork published in 2007.

The species Keurbos susanae was officially described in 2025 in a paper published in Papers in Palaeontology, by Sarah Gabbott (the lead author), Gregory Edgecombe, Johannes Theron and Richard Aldridge. The genus name, Keurbos, is derived from the name of the farm where the holotype was found. The specific name susanae honours Susan Gabbott (the lead author's mother).

Keurbos seems to have been exceptionally rare in the Soom Shale, with only two specimens being recovered over a 20-year timespan and several months of fieldwork. Alongside this, the locality where the holotype was found is now impossible to collect fossils from, due to quarrying activity covering the site in significant overburden.

== Description ==
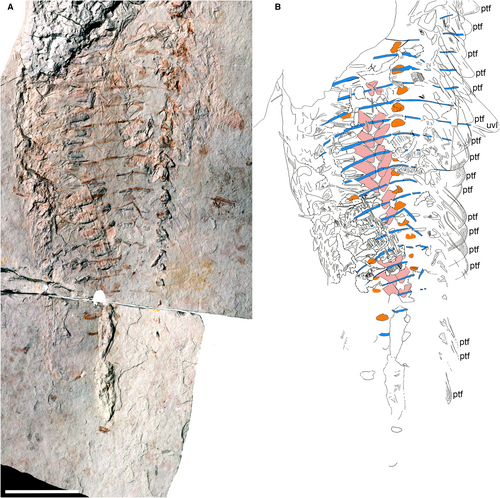
Paratype specimen of Keurbos

Unusually, fossils from the Soom Shale are preserved in an "inverted" manner, where soft tissues are exquisitely preserved but hard parts are demineralised and often preserved as moulds. Because of this, no appendages and only a fragmentary head are preserved on Keurbos. It is known from two specimens that preserve most of the body, although the head is only known from a single specimen. The holotype is around 43 cm (17 in) long. The smaller incomplete paratype is half as wide, and around 15 cm (5.9 in) as preserved.

The head preserves a partial cephalic shield roughly 0.7 times as wide as long, with a pair of unusual arcing setose (with setae, small hairs in invertebrates) structures preserved alongside various patches of muscle fibres within the head. Several irregular patches are also preserved, one with an unusual granular texture not seen anywhere else on the fossil. The arcing setose structures are likely parts of appendages, with the poor preservation of the head suggesting it was preserved in a tucked position.

=== Dorsal anatomy ===
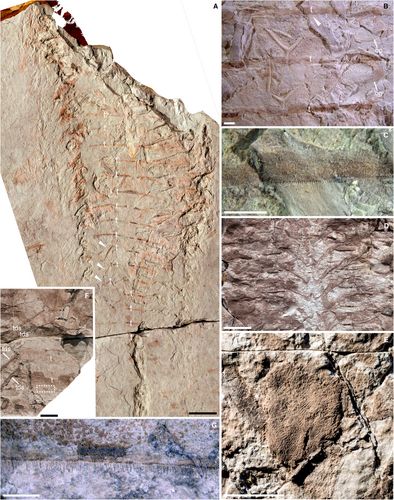
Dorsal anatomy of Keurbos

The trunk of Keurbos has 46 segments with each tergite (dorsal portion of the segment) corresponding to one sternite (ventral segment portion). This trunk narrows gently from 8.5 cm (3.3 in) at the front (anterior end) to 5.3 cm (2.1 in) at the posterior. The dorsal exoskeleton is quite inconspicuous except in the paratype where it extends off the main body. Each tergite is defined by a gently curving convex band at the posterior, with a set of narrow, parallel ridges aligned with the body axis also being present on the posterior edge. In the holotype, the cuticle between the tergite boundaries is covered in fine dimples, alongside a patch of finely ridged brown material likely also representing part of the exoskeleton. In the paratype, the posterior (back) tips of each tergite are rounded into overlapping paratergal (part of the tergite extending out from the body) folds, with no sutures present distinguishing them from the main tergite. At the front of these folds, two ridges are present which likely represent more sclerotised (hardened) cuticle, with both being covered in regular, short, stub-like projections. Behind segment 46, the trunk greatly narrows into a rounded posterior margin consisting of at least nine lobe-like structures, each with gently convex margins. Between segment 46 and these lobes, a plate with large tubercles and an arcing margin is preserved. Unfortunately, due to the poor preservation of ventral anatomy and the multiple cracks in this area of the fossil, it cannot be determined if a tail plate was present.

=== Ventral anatomy ===
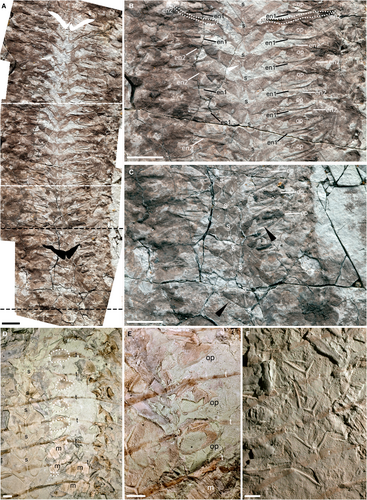
Ventral anatomy of Keurbos

Each segment of Keurbos has a symmetrical series of plates that meet at a Y-shaped structure along the midline. This Y-shaped structure has two prongs anterior (in front) and one shorter one posterior, with each prong having a circular cross-section. On either side of this structure are two subrectangular (rectangular with rounded edges) plates (which reduce in size along with the tapering trunk), likely sternites, with a rough surface and setae along their posterior margin. These setae vary in length and orientation, being longest at the apex (tip) of the convex margin and shorter at the sides. In the holotype, these plates seem to pinch and narrow abaxially (away from the body line), alongside being differentiated between the two halves of the body. In the front half (segments 1–27) they are narrow and do not join at their center in segments where the Y-shaped structure is absent. However, after segment 27 they broaden and join with the Y-shaped structure. This is likely due to a slight change in orientation or split level, rather than any actual change in shape. Outwards from the sternites, two oval to trapezoidal plates are preserved (one pair per segment), being similar to the sternites in having a rough texture and setae on their posterior margin. The holotype's plates are oval, whereas they are more trapezoidal in the paratype. In the holotype, these plates also seem to "merge" with the sternites, appearing contiguous with them.

==== Vascularized lamellae ====
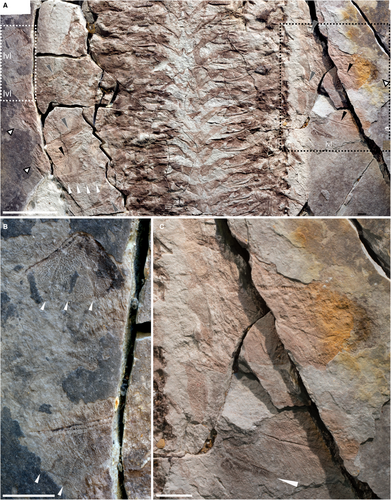
Fossils of Keurbos showing the vascularized lamellae

The Keurbos fossils preserve vascularized lamellae in two groups; upper and lower. The upper lamellae are broadly rounded at their tips and angle slightly backwards, with dimpled surfaces and a robust strut at the anterior margin, with the posterior margin being scalloped with several stubby projections. Inside the strut, a series of lines running perpendicular to the long axis is preserved, with a thin ridge along its midline. Posterior of this ridge, six vein-like structures branch out to the posterior margin. A well-preserved one of these lamellae shows a round patch with a texture identical to the paratergal folds, suggesting these were of similar hardness. The lower lamellae bear dark lines oriented somewhat backwards, flanked by rows of pits. From these pits, three veins branch out, with less spacing than on the upper lamellae. Alongside this, a finer anastomosing (branching with connections) pattern is preserved, fading towards the tip instead of having a defined margin. These lamellae resemble gills on various other arthropods, suggesting they were probably used for the same function.

=== Internal anatomy ===
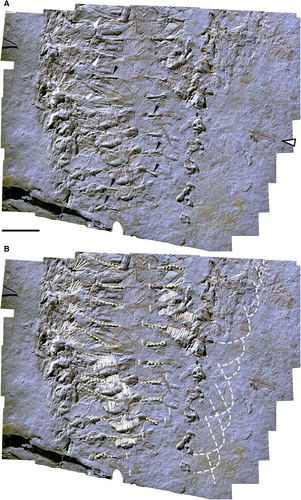
Internal anatomy of the Keurbos paratype specimen

Keurbos remarkably preserves numerous internal structures, including muscles, the gut, and even tendons. The holotype preserves long, arcing structures convex towards the anterior of the animal, extending transversely (long side oriented with the body axis) along the body. These structures' apex is at the Y-shaped structure on the ventral side, with their tips extending to the outward side of the ovoid plates. They seem to be composed of calcium phosphate in the counterpart, and as they seem not to be apodemes (ingrowths of the exoskeleton which serve to anchor structures), their nature is unknown. Near the paratype's posterior, a linear three-dimensional feature is preserved at the midline, being filled with sediment, which likely represents part of the gut.

==== Endoskeletal rods ====
Keurbos exhibits two types of endoskeletal rods (likely tendons), differentiated by their shape and trunk position. Type 1 is oriented transversely and extends from near the outer edge of the sternites to near the body margin. These are often rod-like and tend to be mostly perpendicular to the long axis. However, in the paratype, they are often flanked by a flange of tissue or are more irregular and rope-like. These structures extend near the body wall into triangular muscle blocks. Type 2 extends from the subrectangular sternite plates, often forming a gently concave, anteriorly (towards the front) curving structure that tapers towards the sides. However, some of these structures are more robust with narrow lines extending parallel across them.

==== Muscles ====
Keurbos preserves various regions of muscle across its body, with two regions flanking the sternites (one in segments 1–7 and the other in segments 29–42) being especially well-preserved. The more posterior section is likely transverse muscle for the (unpreserved) limbs, with longitudinal/slightly oblique (slanted) fibres being dorsal longitudinal muscle. The paratype preserves a band of muscle which is also likely the longitudinal type, alongside five triangular masses of muscle, interpreted as "ventral remotor-adductor muscles".

== Classification ==
While Keurbos resembles Arthropleura in multiple characteristics, the two are likely not related.

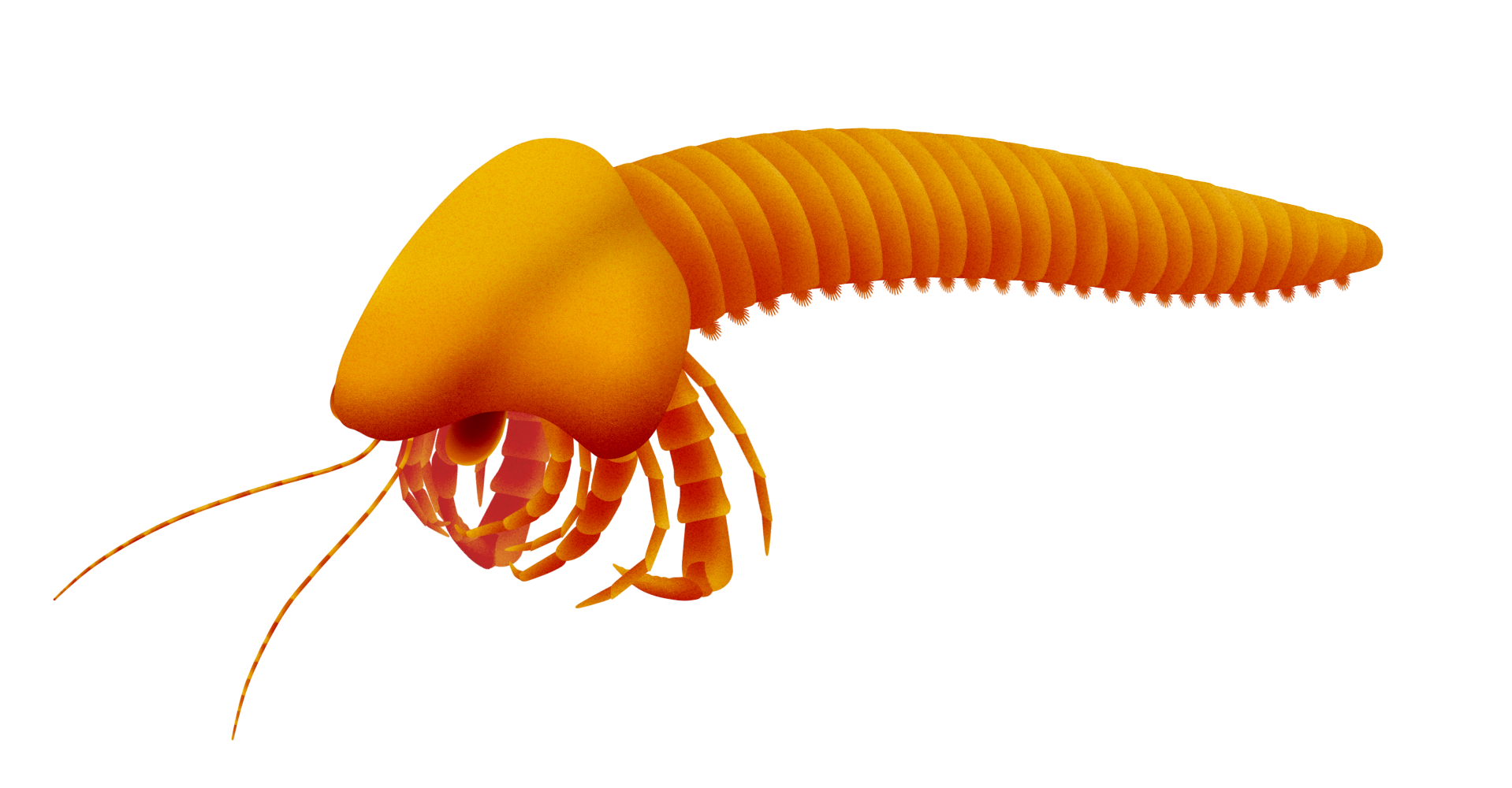
Reconstruction of Acheronauta, the most similar fossil to Keurbos (although most of this is taphonomic)

The lack of head/limb preservation on Keurbos precluded a phylogenetic analysis from being performed by the authors describing it. However, some conclusions can still be made. Keurbos is fully sclerotised, which places it within Euarthropoda, with Parapeytoia (the only former radiodont taxon with sternites) having a very different sternite shape to Keurbos.

The many segments of Keurbos resemble the body of myriapods, but several other characters exclude this possibility; unlike millipedes, it lacks diplosegmentation (one sternite per two tergites) and unlike other myriapods its tergite and sternite lengths are not mismatched. Furthermore, it likely breathed using its vascularized lamellae instead of tracheae like modern myriapods.

The Cambrian fossil Xanthomyria resembles Keurbos more, and even has a similar tergite ornament; however, the latter feature is probably convergent. Alongside this, Keurbos has no long paratergal spines, only having short folds, and so their only similarities are in general body shape. Members of Arthropleurida also only resemble it on a surface level, as Keurbos lacks both the tubercles and unique leg plates which arthropleurids had.

Keurbos also resembles various other taxa, but unfortunately all are only united by a long, homonomous trunk. Fuxianhuiids are excluded through their unusual trunk ends, Pseudoiulia and Meristosoma have insufficient evidence, and even the "enantiopod" arthropods (a group of long-bodied basal pancrustaceans such as Acheronauta and Tanazios) are only vaguely similar.

Keurbos is likely not a mandibulate, as the preserved muscle groups in its head region seem too small to support chewing mandibles. It also does not match closely with chelicerates, as their head muscles are also too specialised for Keurbos to belong within the group. Placement within Artiopoda is excluded, as while it may have had a pygidium due to the incomplete tail region, this is also associated with homoplasy in various arthropod lineages and particularly as a zone of "frozen growth" in trilobites, making the case for it being an artiopod weaker. All of these combined mean that the "enantiopod" grade, despite being ill-fitting, may still be where Keurbos is placed, as all main arthropod clades are excluded.

== Palaeobiology ==
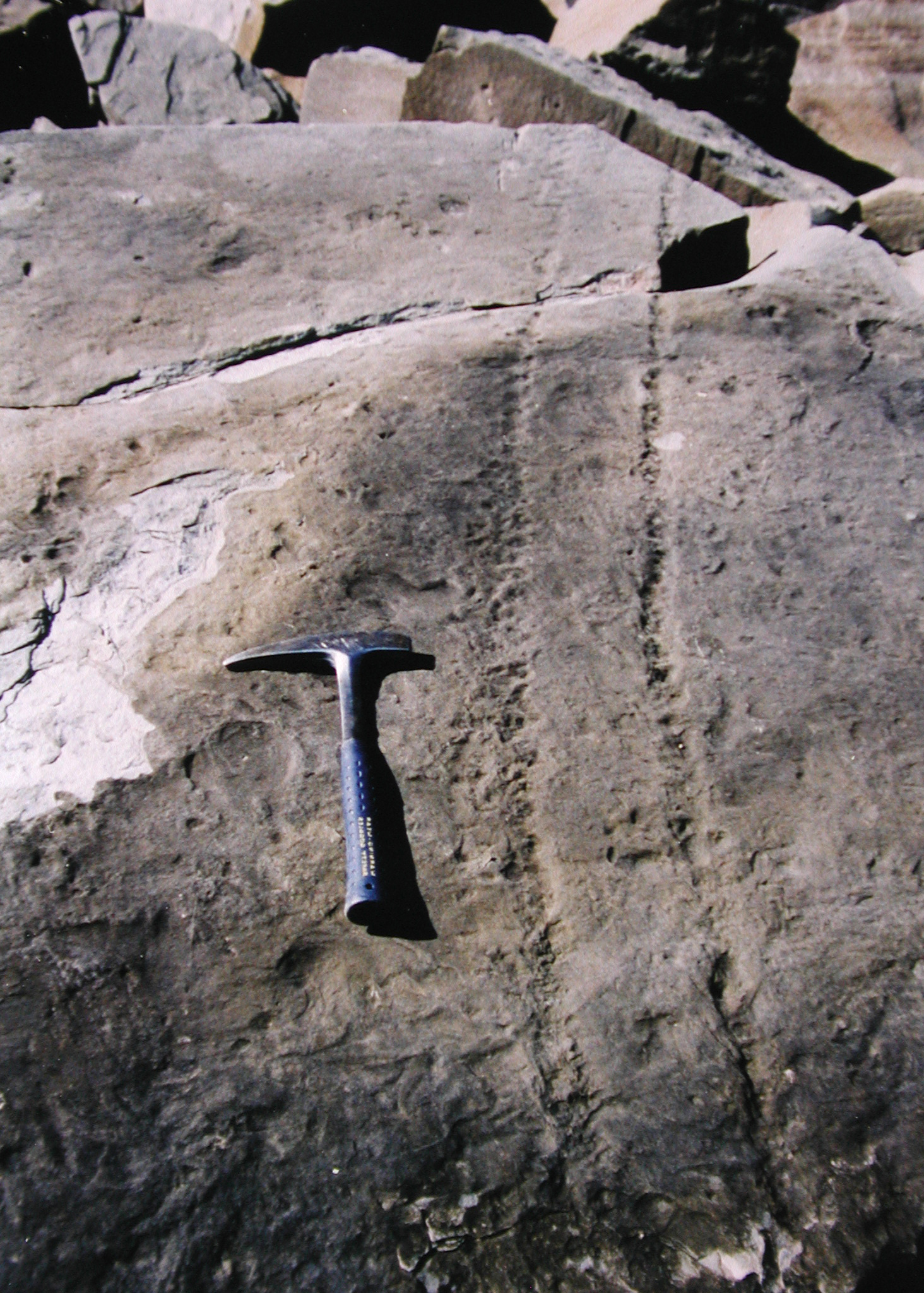
An example of Diplichnites from the Carboniferous, likely from an arthropleurid

Since Keurbos lacks preserved limbs, a detailed palaeobiological analysis cannot be conducted. However, several preserved characters can still give some information. First, it likely did have limbs, as the lower vascularized lamellae are likely exopods, with the corresponding endopods not preserved. These lamellae likely served as gills, a probable adaptation to anoxic conditions (conditions which lack oxygen) in the basin. However, the presence of benthic fauna suggests it was at least somewhat oxygenated for brief periods.

Trackways in the Matjiesgoedkloof locality assigned to Diplichnites may also belong to Keurbos, as their size (trackway width around 8 cm [3.1 in], Keurbos body width up to 15 cm) fits within the range of body sizes for the genus. Alongside this, as Diplichnites is usually associated with arthropleurids elsewhere, the noted similarities between them and Keurbos may further suggest that it created these tracks. Furthermore, both the Keurbos locality where the fossils are from and the Matjiesgoedkloof locality are from virtually the same time and are only around 30 km away from each other (forming a transect), which adds further proof to this hypothesis.

== Palaeoecology ==
Keurbos is known from the Soom Shale, which is dated to around the Ordovician–Silurian boundary (around 445 mya). Due to the absence of a specific chitinozoan species (Spinachitina fragilis), the Soom Shale is interpreted as being latest Ordovician in age. It has also been interpreted as a very cold area (being deposited right after the Hirnantian glaciation), as one locality shows evidence of glacial diamictites. It also contains a wide number of other fauna, such as the conodont Promissum, the nektaspid Soomaspis, an undescribed lobopodian, and the eurypterid Onychopterella. This suggests it was a basin dominated by benthic animals, with pelagic animals having fallen from higher waters.
