= Protoconodont =

Protoconodont Temporal range: Cambrian Possible Carboniferous occurrence in Eoserratosagitta?

Scientific classification
- Kingdom: Animalia
- Phylum: Chaetognatha (?)
- Order: †Protoconodontida; Landing, 1995

Synonyms
- Amphigeisinacea Miller, 1981

Order of jawless fishes

Protoconodonts are an extinct group of Cambrian animals known from fossilized phosphatic tooth-like structures. They were originally described as an informal group of early conodonts, though more recent studies consider them to be more closely related to chaetognaths (arrow worms).

Protoconodont elements are slender and pointed, with a hollow interior which opens towards the base of the structure. They develop entirely by the addition of layers to the inner cavity, extending the rim of the base. There is no additional mineralization on the outer surface, in contrast to paraconodonts or euconodonts (true conodonts). Protoconodont elements are frequently found bundled together into 'superteeth', paired claw-like clusters which may have had a grasping function. These 'superteeth' were previously known by the name "Prooneotodus" tenuis, now classified as a species of Phakelodus. A few protoconodont genera were previously assigned to the class Conodonta and the order Paraconodontida, and the genus Amphigeisina was even given its own superfamily, Amphigeisinacea. Protoconodonts were assumed to have been forerunners to paraconodonts, and by extension euconodonts.

It is now thought that protoconodont elements (e.g., Protohertzina anabarica Missarzhevsky, 1973), are probably grasping jaw spines of stem group chaetognaths rather than the oropharyngeal (mouth or throat) elements of paraconodonts or true conodonts. The jaw spines of Sagitta maxima, a modern chaetognath, are practically identical to the fossils of Phakelodus tenuis in nearly every respect: shape, position, co-occurrence with smaller jaw spicules, and the presence of a sheath-like covering to protect the spines when not in use. This even extends to their three-layered internal microstructure, with a fibrous middle layer and a compatible array of trace elements. Although chaetognath jaws are fully organic (rather than phosphatic), this was likely true of protoconodonts as well, with mineralization only occurring after death due to diagenetic alteration. In light of their taxonomic distinction from paraconodonts and euconodonts, protoconodonts were given their own formal order in 1995: Protoconodontida.

== List of genera ==
- Amphigeisina (Bengtson, 1976)
- Ganloudina He, 1983
- Gapparodus Abaimova, 1978
- Glauderia? Poulsen, 1967
- Gumella Müller & Hinz, 1991
- Hagionella Xie, 1990
- Hertzina Müller, 1959
- Huayuanodontus? (Dong, 1993)
- Kijacus? Missarzhevsky and Mambetov, 1981
- Mongolodus Missarzhevsky, 1977
- Paibiconus? Dong, 1993
- Phakelodus Miller, 1984
- Protohertzina Missarzhevsky, 1973
