= Chappel Limestone =

Geologic formation in Texas, United States

- Stratigraphic range: Carboniferous
- Type: Formation

Lithology
- Primary: limestone

Location
- Region: Texas
- Country: United States

The Chappel Limestone is a geologic formation in Texas. It preserves fossils dating back to the Carboniferous period.

In 1959 Wilbert H. Hass described the conodont genus Dollymae from that formation.

== See also ==
- List of fossiliferous stratigraphic units in Texas
- Paleontology in Texas
