= Conochitina =

Conochitina Temporal range: 466.0–419.2 Ma

Scientific classification
- Domain: Eukaryota
- Kingdom: incertae sedis
- Class: †Chitinozoa
- Order: †Prosomatifera
- Family: †Conochitinidae
- Genus: †Conochitina; Eisenack, 1931

Species
- Several, including: †Conochitina elegans Eisenack, 1931

Genus of marine microfossils

Conochitina is an extinct genus of chitinozoans.

The Luofengxi Group of the Geology of Fujian in China contains metamorphosed sandstone in which Leiomarginata and Conochitina incerta fossils have been found.

== See also ==
- List of chitinozoan genera
