= Balognathidae =

Scientific classification
- Domain: Eukaryota
- Kingdom: Animalia
- Phylum: Chordata
- Infraphylum: Agnatha
- Class: †Conodonta
- Clade: †Prioniodontida
- Family: †Balognathidae; Hass 1959

Genera
- †Amorphognathus; †Baltoniodus; †Birksfeldia; †Icriodella; †Notiodella; †Polyplacognathus; †Prioniodus; †Promissum; †Pterospathodus

Extinct family of jawless fishes

Balognathidae is an extinct conodont family.

== Genera ==
Genera are:

- †Amorphognathus
- †Baltoniodus
- †Birksfeldia
- †Icriodella
- †Notiodella
- †Polyplacognathus
- †Prioniodus
- †Promissum
- †Pterospathodus
