= Cyathochitina =

Scientific classification
- Domain: Eukaryota
- Kingdom: incertae sedis
- Class: †Chitinozoa
- Order: †Prosomatifera
- Family: †Lagenochitindae
- Genus: †Cyathochitina; Eisenack, 1955

Extinct genus of chitinozoans described in 1955

Cyathochitina is an extinct genus of chitinozoans. It was described by Alfred Eisenack in 1955.

== Species ==
- Cyathochitina angusta Nõlvak et Grahn, 1993
- Cyathochitina calix (Eisenack, 1931)
- Cyathochitina campanulaeformis (Eisenack, 1931)
- Cyathochitina costata Grahn, 1982
- Cyathochitina gerdkuhensis Ghavidel-Syooki & Piri-Kangarshahi, 2023
- Cyathochitina giraffa Grahn et Nõlvak, 2010
- Cyathochitina hunderumensis Grahn, Nõlvak et Paris, 1996
- Cyathochitina jagovalensis Schallreuter, 1981
- Cyathochitina kuckersiana (Eisenack, 1934)
- Cyathochitina latipatagium Jenkins, 1969
- Cyathochitina patagiata Jenkins, 1969
- Cyathochitina primitiva Szaniawski, 1974
- Cyathochitina regnelli Eisenack, 1955
- Cyathochitina sebyensis Grahn, 1981
- Cyathochitina? clepsydra Grahn, 1984
