= Pterochitina =

Scientific classification
- Domain: Eukaryota
- Kingdom: incertae sedis
- Class: †Chitinozoa
- Order: †Operculatifera
- Family: †Desmochitinidae
- Genus: †Pterochitina; Eisenack, 1955

Pterochitina is an extinct genus of chitinozoans. It was described by Alfred Eisenack in 1955.

== Species ==
- Pterochitina macroptera Eisenack, 1959
- Pterochitina perivelata (Eisenack, 1937)
- Pterochitina retracta Eisenack, 1955
