= Rhabdochitina =

Scientific classification
- Domain: Eukaryota
- Kingdom: incertae sedis
- Class: †Chitinozoa
- Order: †Prosomatifera
- Family: †Conochitinidae
- Genus: †Rhabdochitina; Eisenack, 1931

Extinct genus of chitinozoans

Rhabdochitina is an extinct genus of chitinozoans. It was described by Alfred Eisenack in 1931.

== Species ==
- Rhabdochitina gracilis Eisenack, 1962
- Rhabdochitina magna Eisenack, 1931
- Rhabdochitina sera Nestor, 2007
