= Lagenochitina =

Lagenochitina Temporal range: Early Ordovician

Scientific classification
- Domain: Eukaryota
- Kingdom: incertae sedis
- Class: †Chitinozoa
- Order: †Prosomatifera
- Family: †Lagenochitindae
- Genus: †Lagenochitina; Eisenack, 1931

Extinct genus of chitinozoans

Lagenochitina is an extinct genus of chitinozoans. It was described by Alfred Eisenack in 1931.

== Species ==
- Lagenochitina baltica Eisenack, 1931
- Lagonochitina estonica eisenack Elsevier Microfossil Wall Chart, F.G Koenig, 1993
- Lagenochitina cylindrica Eisenack, 1931
- Lagenochitina dalbyensis (Laufeld, 1967)
- Lagenochitina deunffi Paris, 1974
- Lagenochitina esthonica Eisenack, 1955
- Lagenochitina longiformis (Obut, 1995)
- Lagenochitina prussica Eisenack, 1931
- Lagenochitina tumida Umnova, 1970
