= Sphaerochitina =

Scientific classification
- Domain: Eukaryota
- Kingdom: incertae sedis
- Class: †Chitinozoa
- Order: †Prosomatifera
- Family: †Lagenochitindae
- Genus: †Sphaerochitina; Eisenack, 1955

Extinct genus of chitinozoans

Sphaerochitina is an extinct genus of chitinozoans. It was described by Alfred Eisenack in 1955.

== Species ==
- Sphaerochitina acanthifera (Eisenack, 1955)
- Sphaerochitina concava Laufeld, 1974
- Sphaerochitina dubia Eisenack, 1968
- Sphaerochitina impia Laufeld, 1974
- Sphaerochitina indecora Nestor, 1982
- Sphaerochitina lycoperdoides Laufeld, 1974
- Sphaerochitina scanicus Grahn, 1996
- Sphaerochitina sphaerocephala (Eisenack, 1932)
