= Angochitina =

Angochitina Temporal range: Ordovician-Carboniferous ~450–326 Ma

Scientific classification
- Domain: Eukaryota
- Kingdom: incertae sedis
- Class: †Chitinozoa
- Order: †Prosomatifera
- Family: †Lagenochitindae
- Genus: †Angochitina; Eisenack 1931

Species
- See text

Angochitina is an extinct genus of chitinozoans. It was described by Alfred Eisenack in 1931.

== Species ==
- A. ambrosi Schweineberg, 1987
- A. capillata Eisenack, 1937
- A. ceratophora Eisenack, 1964
- A. communis Jenkins, 1967
- A. crassispina Eisenack, 1964
- A. curvata Nõlvak et Grahn, 1993
- A. echinata Eisenack, 1931
- A. elongata Eisenack, 1931
- A. filosa Eisenack, 1955
- A. hansonica Soufiane et Achab, 2000
- A. lebaica Eisenack, 1972
- A. longicollis Eisenack, 1959
- A. multiplex (Schallreuter, 1963)
- A. paucispinosa Miller, Sutherland et Dorning, 1997
- A. plicata Noetinger, di Pasquo & Starck 2018

== Fossil distribution ==
Fossils of Angochitina have been found in:

Ordovician

- Pirgu & Vormsi Stages, Estonia

Silurian

- Wutubulake Formation, China
- Kopanina & Pozary Formations, Czech Republic
- Velise Formation, Estonia
- Robledo Formation, Spain
- Malinovtsy series, Ukraine

Devonian

- northwestern Argentina
- Garra Formation, Australia
- Lochkow Formation, Czech Republic
- Saint-Cenere & l'Armorique Formations, France

Carboniferous

- Second Abden Shale, United Kingdom
