= Margachitina =

Scientific classification
- Domain: Eukaryota
- Kingdom: incertae sedis
- Class: †Chitinozoa
- Order: †Operculatifera
- Family: †Desmochitinidae
- Genus: †Margachitina; Eisenack, 1968

Extinct genus of chitinozoans

Margachitina is an extinct genus of chitinozoans. It was described by Alfred Eisenack in 1968.

== Species ==
- Margachitina banwyensis Mullins, 2000
- Margachitina margaritana (Eisenack, 1937)
- Margachitina poculum (Collinson & Schwalb, 1955)
