= Halochitina =

Scientific classification
- Domain: Eukaryota
- Kingdom: incertae sedis
- Class: †Chitinozoa
- Genus: †Halochitina; Eisenack, 1968

Extinct genus of chitinozoans

Halochitina is an extinct genus of chitinozoans. It was described by Alfred Eisenack in 1968. It contains a single species, Halochitina retracta.
