= Clathrochitina =

Scientific classification
- Domain: Eukaryota
- Kingdom: incertae sedis
- Class: †Chitinozoa
- Order: †Prosomatifera
- Family: †Lagenochitindae
- Genus: †Clathrochitina; Eisenack, 1959

Extinct genus of chitinozoans

Clathrochitina is an extinct genus of chitinozoans. It was described by Alfred Eisenack in 1959. It contains a single species, Clathrochitina clathrata.
