= Linochitina =

Scientific classification
- Domain: Eukaryota
- Kingdom: incertae sedis
- Class: †Chitinozoa
- Order: †Operculatifera
- Family: †Desmochitinidae
- Genus: †Linochitina; Eisenack, 1968

Extinct genus of chitinozoans

Linochitina is an extinct genus of chitinozoans. It was described by Alfred Eisenack in 1968. It contains a single species, Linochitina odiosa.
