= Resinodus =

Resinodus Temporal range: Middle Ordovician, Dapingian

Scientific classification
- Kingdom: Animalia
- Phylum: Chordata
- Infraphylum: Agnatha
- Class: †Conodonta
- Order: †Panderodontida
- Family: †Panderodontidae
- Genus: †Resinodus; Mango & Albanesi, 2025

Type species
- †Resinodus nalamamacatus Mango & Albanesi, 2025

Genus of conodont from the Ordovician

Resinodus is a genus of conodont from the Middle Ordovician-aged San Juan Formation of Argentina. It contains the type and only species Resinodus nalamamacatus, named in 2025 by Matías J. Mango and Guillermo L. Albanesi. The generic name is derived from the word resin, referring to the resinous appearance of the fossil elements, whereas the specific name first syllables of the names of the grandparents and great-grandmother of Mango. As with most conodonts, it is only known from conodont elements, tooth structures classified with letter terminology. In total, 76 elements are known, including 32 M elements, 2 S_{a} elements, 2 S_{b} elements, 4 S_{c} elements, 3 S_{d} elements, 6 P_{a} elements, and 27 P_{b} elements. The holotype is CEGH-UNC 27967, a P_{a} element. All specimens are found in the Tripodus precolaevis interval zone of the Portreillos Creek section of the San Juan Formation, dating to the early Dapingian age, alongside 59 other species of conodont.

Anatomically, the jaw is septimembrate, with geniculate M and P elements, and non-geniculate S elements that are coniform and have long bases (the bony support of the tooth). The deep basal cavities of these elements are prominent, occupying a large portion of the base up to the junction with the cusp (the pointed tooth itself). Each of these cusps bears prominent keels on the front and back edges, formed by surface lamellae. This overall morphology is similar to that of Macerodus dianae, but with shorter bases and longer cusps, and the P and M elements are similar to those of Oistodus. All of the elements are hyaline and have a resinous appearance, only otherwise seen in elements of the anatomically dissimilar Westergaardodina. As the material was not an exact match for any one of these genera, Mango and Albanesi concluded it was a novel genus.
