= 1959 in paleontology =

List of years in paleontology	(table)
- … 1949; 1950; 1951; 1952; 1953; 1954; 1955; 1956; 1957; 1958; 1959; 1960; 1961; 1962; 1963; 1964; 1965; 1966; 1967; 1968; 1969 …
- In science 1956 1957 1958 1959 1960 1961 1962
- Art; Archaeology; Architecture; Literature; Music; Philosophy; Science; +...

Paleontology or palaeontology is the study of prehistoric life forms on Earth through the examination of plant and animal fossils. This includes the study of body fossils, tracks (ichnites), burrows, cast-off parts, fossilised feces (coprolites), palynomorphs and chemical residues. Because humans have encountered fossils for millennia, paleontology has a long history both before and after becoming formalized as a science. This article records significant discoveries and events related to paleontology that occurred or were published in the year 1959.

== Arthropods ==
=== Newly named insects ===
Name	Novelty	Status	Authors	Age	Unit	Location	Notes	Images
Penthetria? fryi	Sp nov	valid	Rice	Ypresian	Driftwood Shales	Canada; British Columbia	A bibionid fly	Penthetria (?) fryi
Penthetria whipsawensis	Sp nov	valid	Rice	Ypresian	Allenby Formation	Canada; British Columbia	A bibionid fly	Penthetria whipsawensis
Plecia angustipennis	Comb nov	valid	(Handlirsch)	Ypresian	"Horsefly Shales"	Canada; British Columbia	A bibionid fly Moved from Penthetria angustipennis (1910)	Plecia angustipennis
Plecia avus	Comb nov	valid	(Handlirsch)	Ypresian	Allenby Formation	Canada; British Columbia	A bibionid fly Moved from Penthetria avus (1910)	Plecia avus
Plecia cairnesi	Sp nov	valid	Rice	Ypresian	Driftwood Shales	Canada; British Columbia	A bibionid fly	Plecia cairnesi
Plecia canadensis	Comb nov	valid	(Handlirsch)	Ypresian	Allenby Formation	Canada; British Columbia	A bibionid fly Moved from Penthetria canadensis (1910)	Plecia canadensis
Plecia curtula	Comb and syn nov	valid	(Handlirsch)	Ypresian	"Horsefly Shales"	Canada; British Columbia	A bibionid fly Moved from Penthetria curtula (1910); Senior synonym of Penthetria avunculus (1910)	Plecia curtula
Plecia dilatata	Comb nov	valid	(Handlirsch)	Ypresian	"Horsefly Shales"	Canada; British Columbia	A bibionid fly Moved from Penthetria dilatata (1910)	Plecia dilatata
Plecia elatior	Comb nov	valid	(Handlirsch)	Ypresian	Allenby Formation	Canada; British Columbia	A bibionid fly Moved from Penthetria elatior (1910)	Plecia elatior
Plecia intermedia	Comb nov	jr synonym	(Scudder)	Priabonian	Florissant Formation	United States; Colorado	A bibionid fly Moved from Mycetophaetus intermedius (1892); Moved to Penthetria intermedia (1999)	
Plecia kelownaensis	Sp nov	valid	Rice	Ypresian	Coldwater Beds	Canada; British Columbia	A bibionid fly	Plecia kelownaensis
Plecia minutula	Sp nov	valid	Rice	Ypresian	Allenby Formation	Canada; British Columbia	A bibionid fly	Plecia minutula
Plecia nana	Comb nov	valid	(Handlirsch)	Ypresian	Allenby Formation	Canada; British Columbia	A bibionid fly Moved from Penthetria nana (1910)	Plecia nana
Plecia pictipennis	Comb and syn nov	valid	(Handlirsch)	Ypresian	Allenby Formation	Canada; British Columbia	A bibionid fly Moved from Penthetria pictipennis (1910); Senior synonym of Penthetria lambei, Pe. ovalis, & Pe. separanda (1910)	Plecia pictipennis
Plecia platyptera	Comb nov	valid	(Handlirsch)	Ypresian	"Horsefly Shales"	Canada; British Columbia	A bibionid fly Moved from Penthetria platyptera (1910)	Plecia platyptera
Plecia pulchra	Comb nov	valid	(Handlirsch)	Ypresian	Allenby Formation	Canada; British Columbia	A bibionid fly Moved from Penthetria pulchra (1910)	Plecia pulchra
Plecia pulla	Comb and syn nov	valid	(Handlirsch)	Ypresian	Allenby Formation	Canada; British Columbia	A bibionid fly Moved from Penthetria pulla (1910); Senior synonym of Penthetria brevipes (1910)	Plecia pulla
Plecia reducta	Comb nov	valid	(Handlirsch)	Ypresian	"Horsefly Shales"	Canada; British Columbia	A bibionid fly Moved from Penthetria reducta (1910)	Plecia reducta
Plecia transitoria	Comb and syn nov	valid	(Handlirsch)	Ypresian	"Horsefly Shales"	Canada; British Columbia	A bibionid fly Moved from Penthetria transitoria (1910); Senior synonym of Penthetria falcatula & Pe. fragmentum (1910)	Plecia transitoria
Plecia tulameenensis	Sp nov	valid	Rice	Ypresian	Allenby Formation	Canada; British Columbia	A bibionid fly	Plecia tulameenensis

== Conodonts ==
German paleontologist Klaus J. Müller (1923-2010) described the conodont family Westergaardodinidae.

Name	Novelty	Status	Authors	Age	Unit	Location	Notes	Images
Dollymae		valid	Hass	Carboniferous			Type species D. sagittula	
Furnishina	Gen et sp nov.	valid	Müller	Cambrian			Type species F. furnishi	
Hertzina		valid	Müller	Cambrian			Type species H. bisulcata	
Westergaardodina	Gen et sp nov	valid	Müller	Cambrian			Type species W. bicuspidata	

== Archosauromorphs ==
=== Incertae sedis ===
Name	Status	Authors	Age	Unit	Location	Notes	Images
Palaeosauriscus	Junior synonym	Kuhn	Late Triassic			Junior synonym of Palaeosaurus.	

=== Newly named pseudosuchians ===
Name	Status	Authors	Age	Unit	Location	Notes	Images
Clarencea	Junior synonym	Brink	Early Jurassic (Hettangian-Sinemurian)				

=== Newly named dinosaurs ===
Data courtesy of George Olshevsky's dinosaur genera list.

Name	Status	Authors	Age	Unit	Location	Notes	Images
Chialingosaurus	Valid taxon.	Yang Zhongjian (as Young C. C.)	Late Jurassic (Bathonian-Callovian)		China	A stegosaur.	Chialingosaurus
Pachysauriscus	Disputed	Kuhn	Late Triassic (Norian)			Possible junior synonym of Plateosaurus.	

== Plesiosaurs ==
=== Newly named Plesiosaurs ===
Name	Status	Authors	Age	Unit	Location	Notes
Stretosaurus	Nomen dubium	Tarlo	Late Jurassic (Kimmeridgian)			A dubious pliosaurid belonging to Thalassophonea.

== Birds ==
=== Newly named birds ===
Name	Novelty	Status	Authors	Age	Unit	Location	Notes	Images
Anthropodyptes	Gen. et Sp. nov.	valid	Simpson	Middle Miocene, Balcombian Stage		Australia	A Spheniscidae, type species A. gilli	
Bathoceleus	Gen. nov. et Sp. nov.	valid	Brodkorb	Pleistocene-Late Holocene	Banana Hole, New Providence Island	Bahamas	A Picidae, type species B. hyphalus.	
Burhinus nanus	Sp. nov.	valid	Brodkorb	Pleistocene-Late Holocene	Banana Hole, New Providence Island	Bahamas	A Burhinidae.	
Caracara creightoni	Sp. nov.	valid	Brodkorb	Pleistocene	Banana Hole, New Providence Island	Bahamas	A Falconidae.	
Colinus suilium	Sp. nov.	valid	Brodkorb	Middle Pleistocene	Reddics beds, Arredondo clay	USAFlorida	An Odontophoridae.	
Cremaster tytthus	Gen. et Sp. nov.	valid	Brodkorb	Middle Pleistocene	Arredondo clay	USAFlorida	An Icteridae, type species C. tytthus.	
Henocitta	Gen. et Sp. nov.	valid	Holman	Pleistocene	Arredondo clay	USAFlorida	A Corvidae, type species H. brodkorbi.	
Falco readei	Sp. nov.	synonym	Brodkorb	Pleistocene	Arredondo clay	USAFlorida	A Falconidae, moved to Milvago readei.	
Pliogyps	Gen. et Sp. nov.	valid	Tordoff	Pliocene	Rexroad Formation	USA Kansas	A Cathartidae, type species P. fisheri	
Coltonia recurvirostra	Sp. nov.	synonym	Hardy	Early Eocene	Colton Formation	USAUtah	A Presbyornithidae, moved to Presbyornis recurvirostrus.	

== Pterosaurs ==
=== New taxa ===
Name	Status	Authors	Age	Unit	Location	Notes
Titanopteryx	Preoccupied	Arambourg	Late Cretaceous (Maastrichtian)	Phosphate deposits	Israel; Senegal; USA (New Jersey)	Later renamed Arambourgiana Nesov, Kanznyshkina, and Cherepanov, 1987
