= Muellerilepis =

Muellerilepis Temporal range: Givetian

Scientific classification
- Kingdom: Animalia
- Phylum: Chordata
- Class: †Conodonta
- Genus: †Muellerilepis Bardashev & Bardasheva (2013)

Synonyms
- †Muellerina Bardashev & Bardasheva (2012) (preoccupied); †Muellerina idrisovi

Extinct genus of jawless fishes

Muellerilepis is an extinct genus of conodonts.

The name is a tribute to German paleontologist Klaus J. Müller (1923-2010). It is a replacement generic name for Muellerina Bardashev et Bardasheva, 2012. which is preoccupied.

Muellerina idrisovi is from the Middle Devonian (Givetian) of Tajikistan.
