= Ancyrochitina =

Scientific classification
- Domain: Eukaryota
- Kingdom: incertae sedis
- Class: †Chitinozoa
- Order: †Prosomatifera
- Family: †Lagenochitindae
- Genus: †Ancyrochitina; Eisenack, 1955

Ancyrochitina is an extinct genus of chitinozoans. It was described by Alfred Eisenack in 1955.

== Species ==
- Ancyrochitina ancyrea (Eisenack, 1931)
- Ancyrochitina ansarviensis Laufeld, 1974
- Ancyrochitina bifurcaspina Nestor, 1994
- Ancyrochitina bornholmensis Vandenbroucke & Nõlvak, 2013
- Ancyrochitina brevispinosa Eisenack, 1968
- Ancyrochitina clathrospinosa Eisenack, 1968
- Ancyrochitina convexa Nestor, 1980
- Ancyrochitina diabolus (Eisenack, 1937)
- Ancyrochitina digitata Mullins et Aldridge, 2004
- Ancyrochitina fragilis Eisenack, 1955
- Ancyrochitina gogginensis Sutherland, 1994
- Ancyrochitina gutnica Laufeld, 1974
- Ancyrochitina laevaensis Nestor, 1980
- Ancyrochitina mullinsi Nestor, 2005
- Ancyrochitina paulaspina Nestor, 1994
- Ancyrochitina pedavis Laufeld, 1974
- Ancyrochitina plurispinosa Nestor, 1994
- Ancyrochitina porrectaspina Nestor, 1994
- Ancyrochitina primitiva Eisenack, 1964
- Ancyrochitina ramosaspina Nestor, 1994
- Ancyrochitina rumbaensis Nestor, 1994
- Ancyrochitina tomentosa Taugourdeau et de Jekhowsky, 1960
- Ancyrochitina vikiensis Nestor, 1994
