= Acanthochitina =

Scientific classification
- Domain: Eukaryota
- Kingdom: incertae sedis
- Class: †Chitinozoa
- Order: †Prosomatifera
- Family: †Conochitinidae
- Genus: †Acanthochitina; Eisenack, 1931

Acanthochitina is an extinct genus of chitinozoans. It was described by Alfred Eisenack in 1931. It contains a single species, Acanthochitina barbata.
