= Klaus Jürgen Müller =

Klaus Jürgen Müller may refer to

- Klaus J. Müller (1923–2010), German paleontologist
- Klaus-Jürgen Müller (historian) (1930–2011), German historian, and advisor to Bernd Wegner
