= Geology of Fujian =

Regional geology of China

Fujian is a south-eastern coastal province of China. The eastern half of the province is largely covered by Jurassic Period acid volcanic rocks and Cretaceous tuffaceous sandstone. However, there are rocks of a variety of ages including the oldest around 1800 Ma (million years old). The deposits from the Triassic are predominantly on land, whereas the older ones are marine sediments.

Prior to the Ediacaran the continent was assembled from several terranes. In the early Paleozoic the environment was a continental slope. In the later Paleozoic the area was a platform, and from the Mesozoic period till now it has been affected by the edge of the Pacific Ocean.

== Stratigraphy ==
The Badu Group from the Lower Proterozoic consists of biotite schist and gneiss around 1800 Ma and is found north of Songxi.

The Mayuan Group from middle Proterozoic consists of muscovite schist and includes leptite, marble and graphite beds.

=== Ediacaran ===
The Louziba Group in the southwest of Fujian consists mostly of sandstone.

The Wudan Formation in north-west Fujian contains graywacke and quartz rich sandstone.

The Dikou Formation in north-east Fujian contains biotite leptite.

The Dingwuling Formation in western Fujian.

Longbeixi Formation on eastern Fujian.

Nanyan Group in southwest has grey phyllite.

Huanglian Formation in southwest consists mostly of silicalite. The northwest and east areas are not well differentiated in the Ediacaran, but contain metamorphic rocks such as siltite leptite and actinolite schist.

=== Cambrian ===
The Lintian group contains grey metamorphosed sandstone, phyllite and slate up to 4 km thick in western Fujian. The Dongkengkou Group contains metamorphosed calcareous sandstone. It contains Protospongia fossils. Beds are up to 1 km thick.

=== Ordovician ===
The Weifang Group contains dark phyllite and limestone with Didymograptus graptolite fossils. The Luofengxi Group contains metamorphosed sandstone in which Leiomarginata and Conochitina incerta fossils have been found.

During the Silurian and early Devonian an unconformity formed.

=== Devonian ===
The Devonian saw terrestrial deposits. The Tianwadong Formation contained thick conglomerate beds with plant fossils like Cyclostigma and Leptophloem rhombicum. The Taozikeng Formation also contained conglomerate and included Sublepidodendrum fossils.

=== Carboniferous ===
The Lindi Formation had more conglomerate and sandstone, with traces of limestone and coal. Plant fossils include Rhodeopteridium and neuropteris.

The Huanlong Formation contains clastic limestone and dolomite in the southwest region. |There are Fusulid fossils such as Profusulinella, Fusulinella, and Fusulina. The Chuanshan Formation has beds of limestone and dolomite. Montiparus, Titicites and Pseudoschwagerina fossils are found in it.

Meanwhile, in the Upper Carboniferous mudstone formed in the northeast of the province. Fossils there include Neospirifer a brachiopod and Neostaffella.

=== Permian ===
The Qixia Formation contains dark grey chert interbedded with limestone. The Wenbishan Formation is marine mudstone with phosphate and pyrite nodules. Ammonite fossils such as Altudoceras, Shouchangdoceras are there, and Haydenella a brachipod is also found. The Tongziyan Formation has sandstone, siltstone and mudstone. The upper Permian Cuipingshan Formation has thin beds of sandstone and siltstone and coal. The Dalong Formation has mudstone with limestone lenses in the west. The Changxing formation is primarily limestone.

=== Triassic ===
The Triassic contains Xikou, Xiwei, Anren Dakeng Formations followed by a partial unconformity, then Wenbinshan, and Jiaokeng Formation containing conglomerate. The Xikou Formation in Southwest Fujian, consists of a fine grained turbidite. In the areas near Longyan Yongding and Zhangping there are large blocks of oolitic limestone embedded.

=== Jurassic ===
The Lishan formation contains sandstone and some acid volcanic particles. The Zhangping formation is mostly purple red siltstone. The Changling Formation contains more volcano derived particles. Nanyuan Formation is the main volcanic strata with up to 8 km thick of intermediate and acid volcanic lava, and tuff. A dinosaur Rhynchosaurus orientalis fossil has been found in this. The Bantou Formation has paper shale and mudstone in the west, and tuff and acid volcanic rock in the east.

=== Cretaceous ===
Hekou Formation contains purple-red sandstone and green grey siltstone in the west. Contemporaneously in the east basalt, dacite, rhyolite and quartz trachyte along with sediments derived from these make up the Shimaoshan Group. In the Upper Cretaceous the Shaxian Formation, the Chishi Formation with purple red sandstone is in the west, and Shiniushan Formation contains conglomerate and volcanic particles dated from 88-91 Ma.

=== Neogene ===
In the Paleogene surviving deposits were not formed. The Fotan Group formed with Basalt and conglomerate.

== Volcanic rocks ==
Fujian has two volcanic rock provinces. The East Fujian-Taiwan volcanic rock region includes a strip along the coast. The rest of the province falls into the Zhejiang-Fujian-Guandong volcanic rock region. Both are part of the South China techtono-magmatic province. The Zhejiang-Fujian-Guandong volcanic rocks are mostly rhyolite and dacite rich in potassium, from Late Jurassic to Early Cretaceous. The magmas were formed in an environment first under compression, and later under tension. The East Fujian-Taiwan volcanic rocks in Fujian formed in a continental shelf environment, with alkali basalt erupted around 11.65 Ma on the coast near Fotan.

== Intrusives ==
Numerous granitic intrusions took place along with the volcanoes in the Jurassic and Cretaceous.

== Minerals ==
A number of minerals were discovered in Fujian or have their type locations there.

Nanpingite comes from the Nanping pegmatite in Zenghe County. It has formula CsAl_{2}(AlSi_{3}O_{10})OH,F)_{2} being a cesium mica.

Chiluite was found in the Chilu molybdenum deposit in Fu'an County. The formula is Bi_{3}TeMoO_{10.5}.

== Study ==
The Fujian Geological Museum is in Fuzhou with 1200 square meters of space.

A journal called Geology of Fujian (Fujian Dizhi 福建地質) is published by the Fujian Bureau of Geology and Mineral Exploration Geoscience and publishes four issues per year.

Geology parks have been set up at Taining. The Zhangzhou Coastal Volcano National Geology Park was established in 2001.

== Offshore ==
Offshore from the province northern coast is the East China Sea. The sea floor formed by sea floor spreading starting in the Jurassic and continuing to the Pliocene period. The Taiwan Strait off the south coast is actually continental crust beneath.

== Structure ==
Faults and structure lines are roughly parallel to the coast, northeast-southwest, and reflect interaction with the Pacific Plate.

== Geophysics ==
=== Heat flow ===
Heat flow in the east of Fujian is higher than the west, due to a thinner lithosphere. There are a thermal springs cause by groundwater coming from depth along faults.

== Mining ==
Fujian is noted for its sand, Shoushan stone, barite, kaolin and granite.
