= Hertzina =

Furnishinidae Temporal range: Cambrian

Scientific classification
- Kingdom: Animalia
- Phylum: Chordata
- Order: †Paraconodontida
- Family: †Furnishinidae
- Genus: †Hertzina; Müller, 1959

Species
- †Hertzina antiqua Yang and He 1984; †Hertzina bisulcata Müller 1959; †Hertzina danica Poulsen; †Hertzina guizhouensis Qian and Yin 1984; †Hertzina intermedia Yang and He 1984

Extinct genus of jawless fishes

Hertzina is an extinct genus of conodonts in the family Furnishinidae. Fossils can be found in the Wheeler Shale Cambrian (c. 507 Mya) fossil locality in Utah, United States.
