= Prioniodus =

Prioniodus Temporal range: Ordovician–Carboniferous

Scientific classification
- Kingdom: Animalia
- Phylum: Chordata
- Infraphylum: Agnatha
- Class: †Conodonta
- Clade: †Prioniodontida
- Family: †Balognathidae
- Genus: †Prioniodus; Pander 1856

Species
- †Prioniodus altodus Harlton 1933; †Prioniodus antiquus Zhen et al. 2023; †Prioniodus cacti Gunnell 1933; †Prioniodus dactylodus Gunnell 1933; †Prioniodus elegans Miller 1889 (type); †Prioniodus galesburgensis Gunnell 1933

Extinct genus of jawless fishes

Prioniodus is an extinct genus of conodonts in the family Balognathidae from the Ordovician.

Prioniodus elegans is from the Ordovician of Baltoscandia.
