= Anthochitina =

Scientific classification
- Domain: Eukaryota
- Kingdom: incertae sedis
- Class: †Chitinozoa
- Order: †Prosomatifera
- Family: †Lagenochitindae
- Genus: †Anthochitina; Nestor, 1994

Extinct genus of chitinozoans

Anthochitina is an extinct genus of chitinozoans. It was described by Nestor in 1994. It contains a single species, Anthochitina primula.
