= Protohertzina =

Protohertzina Temporal range: Early Cambrian

Scientific classification
- Kingdom: Animalia
- Phylum: ?Chordata ?Chaetognatha
- Class: ?†Conodonta
- Order: ?Protoconodonta ?Paraconodonta
- Family: ?Amphigeisinidae
- Genus: †Protohertzina Missarzhevsky, 1973

Species
- Protohertzina anabarica Missarzhevsky 1973 (type); Protohertzina compressa Slater, Harvey & Butterfield 2018; Protohertzina cultrata Missarzhevsky 1977; Protohertzina dabashanensis Yang & He 1984; Hastina quadrigoniata Yang & He 1984; Protohertzina robusta Qian 1977; Protohertzina siciformis Missarzhevsky 1973; Protohertzina unguliformis Missarzhevsky 1973

Synonyms
- Emeidus Chen 1982; Hastina Yang and He 1984

Genus of jawless fishes

Protohertzina is a genus of conodonts (protoconodonts or paraconodonts) or, possibly, Chaetognaths, found at the beginning of the Cambrian explosion.

Protoconodonts are an extinct taxonomic group of conodonts. Chaetognaths (also known as arrow worms) were thought possibly to be related to some of the animals grouped with the conodonts. The conodonts themselves, however, are thought to be early vertebrates. It is now thought that protoconodont elements (e.g., Protohertzina anabarica Missarzhevsky, 1973), are probably grasping spines of chaetognaths rather than teeth of conodonts.

Protohertzina fossils have been found in the Ingta Formation of Canada.

== Use in stratigraphy ==
The earliest known fossils of the late Precambrian and early Cambrian come from the small shelly fossil assemblage of the Anabarites trisulcatus Zone of the Lower Nemakit-Daldynian Stage, Siberia. They are analogous to China's Anabarites trisulcatus-Protohertzina anabarica Zone of the basal Meishucunian Stage.
