= Pistillachitina =

Scientific classification
- Domain: Eukaryota
- Clade: incertae sedis
- Class: †Chitinozoa
- Order: †Prosomatifera
- Family: †Conochitinidae
- Genus: †Pistillachitina; Taugourdeau, 1966

Fossil genus of chitinozoans

Pistillachitina is an extinct genus of chitinozoans. It was described by Taugourdeau in 1966.

== Species ==
- Pistillachitina elegans (Eisenack, 1931)
- Pistillachitina pistillifrons (Eisenack, 1939)
- Pistillachitina alborzensis (Ghavidel-Syooki, 2025)
- Pistillachitina iranense (Ghavidel-Syooki, 2025)
