= Sarah Gabbott =

Palaeobiologist

- Education: University of Southampton; University of Leicester
- Scientific career
- Workplaces: University of Leicester
- Thesis: The palaeontology and taphonomy of the Soom Shale : an Upper Ordovician lagerstatte, South Africa. (1996)
- Website: https://www2.le.ac.uk/departments/geology/people/gabbott-s

Sarah Gabbott is a palaeobiologist from the University of Leicester. She is known for her research on decomposition and fossilization. Her focus is soft-bodied animals, details of which are often lost during decay.

== Early life and education ==
Gabbott received an undergraduate degree in geology from the University of Southampton. She went on to receive a doctorate in paleobiology from the University of Leicester on the topic of Soom Shale fossils. She remained at the University of Leicester as a post-doctoral researcher before being appointed lecturer.

== Career ==
Gabbott leads a paleobiology lab at the University of Leicester which studies the way primitive vertebrates, such as hagfish or rag worms, decompose. This work sheds light on the process of fossilization by determining which types of tissues are preserved and which of them rot away rapidly. The findings can improve the quality of modern reconstructions or restorations based on fossils. In particular, features that evolved more recently were among the first to decay, causing fossils to appear like their ancestors and making identification more difficult. Gabbott also studies environmental factors to fossil preservation. She often works with extremely well-preserved fossils such as those from the Burgess Shales or the Soom Shale.

In 2016, Gabbott's team determined that Tullimonstrum is a vertebrate based on cellular structures in the eyes. Further investigations into eye tissues of jawless fish fossils showed that vision was more developed in Carboniferous hagfish than in their modern counterparts. This process is known as regressive evolution.

Gabbott's research interest include soft-bodied animals from the Cambrian Period. In 2017, she studied symbiotic relationships between worms after fossils of Inquicus fellatus were found attached to the larger Cricocosmia jinnigensis and Mafangscolex sinensi. In 2018, Gabbott was a co-discoverer of the chancelloriid species Allonnia nuda.

Since 2017, she has expanded her research focus to address the long-term effects of plastic in the environment.

Gabbott is Director of the Advanced Microscopy Centre at the University of Leicester Department of Engineering.

In 2003, Gabbott was featured on the BBC series "The Big Monster Dig".

== Awards and honours ==
- 1998 President's Award of the Geological Society of London
- 1994 Annual Meeting President's Prize of the Palaeontological Association

== Personal life ==
Gabbott is a contributor to BBC online science articles.
