= Tanuchitina =

Scientific classification
- Domain: Eukaryota
- Kingdom: incertae sedis
- Class: †Chitinozoa
- Order: †Prosomatifera
- Family: †Conochitinidae
- Genus: †Tanuchitina; Jansonius, 1964

Tanuchitina is an extinct genus of chitinozoans. It was described by Jansonius in 1964.

== Species ==
- Tanuchitina anticostiensis (Achab, 1977)
- Tanuchitina bergstroemi Laufeld, 1967
- Tanuchitina tallinnensis Grahn, 1984
