= Salopochitina =

Scientific classification
- Domain: Eukaryota
- Kingdom: incertae sedis
- Class: †Chitinozoa
- Order: †Operculatifera
- Family: †Desmochitinidae
- Genus: †Salopochitina; Swire, 1990

Extinct genus of chitinozoans

Salopochitina is an extinct genus of chitinozoans. It was described by Swire in 1990. It contains a single species, Salopochitina filifera.
