= Notiodella =

Scientific classification
- Domain: Eukaryota
- Kingdom: Animalia
- Phylum: Chordata
- Infraphylum: Agnatha
- Class: †Conodonta
- Family: †Balognathidae
- Genus: †Notiodella; R.J. Aldridge et al 2013

Type species
- †Notiodella keblon

Extinct genus of jawless fishes

Notiodella is an extinct conodont genus in the family Balognathidae. It has been described from a 17-element apparatus from the Soom Shale Lagerstätte (Upper Ordovician) in South Africa.
