= Wilbert H. Hass =

Wilbert Henry Hass (1906–1959) was an invertebrate paleontologist specializing in the study of conodonts. He joined the Section of Paleontology and Stratigraphy of the United States Geological Survey (USGS) in 1930 when he was appointed Junior Scientific Aide. He was promoted to the rank of Geologist in 1940 and remained with the USGS for the remainder of his life.

== Work ==
- Morphology of Conodonts. Wilbert H. Hass, 1941
- Orientation of the Crystal Units of Conodonts. Wilbert H. Hass and Marie L. Lindberg, 1946
- Conodonts of the Barnett Formation of Texas. Wilbert H. Hass, 1952

In 1959, he described the conodont genus Dollymae and the conodont families Balognathidae, Cyrtoniodontidae and Spathognathodontidae from the Chappel limestone of Texas.

== Tributes ==
The conodont species name Dollymae hassi is a tribute to WH Hass.
