= Fungochitina =

Scientific classification
- Domain: Eukaryota
- Kingdom: incertae sedis
- Class: †Chitinozoa
- Order: †Prosomatifera
- Family: †Lagenochitindae
- Genus: †Fungochitina; Taugourdeau, 1966

Fungochitina is an extinct genus of chitinozoans. It was described by Taugourdeau in 1966.

== Species ==
- Fungochitina fungiformis (Eisenack, 1931)
- Fungochitina kosovensis Paris et Křiž, 1984
- Fungochitina pistilliformis (Eisenack, 1931)
- Fungochitina spinifera (Eisenack, 1962)
