= Baltoniodus =

Baltoniodus Temporal range: Dapingian–Sandbian

Scientific classification
- Kingdom: Animalia
- Phylum: Chordata
- Infraphylum: Agnatha
- Class: †Conodonta
- Family: †Balognathidae
- Genus: †Baltoniodus; Lindström, 1971

Species
- †Baltoniodus alobatus; †Baltoniodus cooperi; †Baltoniodus gerdae; †Baltoniodus medius; †Baltoniodus navis; †Baltoniodus norrlandicus; †Baltoniodus prevariabilis; †Baltoniodus triangularis; †Baltoniodus variabilis

Extinct genus of jawless fishes

Baltoniodus is an extinct genus of conodonts.

== Use in stratigraphy ==
The base of the Dapingian, the first stage of the Middle Ordovician, is defined as the first appearance of Baltoniodus triangularis.

The Whiterock Stage refers mainly to the early Middle Ordovician in North America, it is often used in the older literature in a global sense. The Whiterock Stage is given a range from 471.8 (ca. 472) to 462 m.y.a., spanning close to 10 million years. Officially its start is defined by the potentially lowest occurrence of the conodont Protoprioniodus aranda or Baltoniodus triangularis.

B. gerdae has been found in the early Sandbian Bromide Formation, in Oklahoma, USA.
