= Mongolodus =

Mongolodus Temporal range: Early Cambrian

Scientific classification
- Kingdom: Animalia
- Phylum: ?Chordata
- Class: ?†Conodonta ?Chaetognatha
- Order: †Protoconodonta
- Family: †Mongolodidae
- Genus: †Mongolodus Missarzhevsky, 1977

Species
- †Maldeotaia bandalica; †Mongolodus longispinus; †Mongolodus maximi; †Mongolodus platybasalis; †Mongolodus sulcus

Synonyms
- †Maldeotaia Singh and Shukla, 1981

Extinct genus of jawless fishes

Mongolodus is an extinct genus of protoconodonts.
