= Belonechitina =

Belonechitina Temporal range: Early Ordovician–Llandovery

Scientific classification
- Domain: Eukaryota
- Kingdom: incertae sedis
- Class: †Chitinozoa
- Order: †Prosomatifera
- Family: †Conochitinidae
- Genus: †Belonechitina; Jansonius, 1964

Belonechitina is an extinct genus of chitinozoans. It was described by Jansonius in 1964. Fossils of members of this genus have been found mainly in the Northern Hemisphere in Canada, China, Oman, and in Western and Northern Europe.

== Species ==
- Belonechitina aspera (Nestor, 1980)
- Belonechitina cactacea (Eisenack, 1937)
- Belonechitina capitata (Eisenack, 1962)
- Belonechitina comma (Eisenack, 1959)
- Belonechitina crinita (Grahn, 1984)
- Belonechitina gamachiana (Achab, 1978)
- Belonechitina granosa (Laufeld, 1974)
- Belonechitina hirsuta (Laufeld, 1967)
- Belonechitina intonsa Nõlvak et Bauert, 2015
- Belonechitina jaanussonii Grahn et Nõlvak, 2010
- Belonechitina latifrons (Eisenack, 1964)
- Belonechitina meifodensis Mullins et Loydell, 2001
- Belonechitina micracantha (Eisenack, 1931)
- Belonechitina oeselensis Nestor, 2005
- Belonechitina pellifera (Eisenack, 1959)
- Belonechitina postrobusta (Nestor, 1980)
- Belonechitina robusta (Eisenack, 1959)
- Belonechitina synclinalis (Eisenack, 1965)
- Belonechitina villosa (Grahn, 1982)
