= Amorphognathus =

Amorphognathus Temporal range: Ordovician

Scientific classification
- Kingdom: Animalia
- Phylum: Chordata
- Infraphylum: Agnatha
- Class: †Conodonta
- Clade: †Prioniodontida
- Family: †Balognathidae
- Genus: †Amorphognathus; Branson and Mehl 1933

Species
- †Amorphognathus lindstroemi; †Amorphognathus ordovicicus; †Amorphognathus quinquiradiatus

Synonyms
- Balognathus Rhodes 1953

Extinct genus of jawless fishes

Amorphognathus is an extinct conodont genus in the family Balognathidae from the Ordovician.
