= Spinachitina =

Scientific classification
- Domain: Eukaryota
- Kingdom: incertae sedis
- Class: †Chitinozoa
- Order: †Prosomatifera
- Family: †Conochitinidae
- Genus: †Spinachitina; Schallreuter, 1963

Extinct genus of chitinozoans

Spinachitina is an extinct genus of chitinozoans. It was described by Schallreuter in 1963.

== Species ==
- Spinachitina cervicornis (Eisenack, 1931)
- Spinachitina coronata (Eisenack, 1931)
- Spinachitina fragilis (Nestor, 1980)
- Spinachitina maennili (Nestor, 1980)
- Spinachitina multiradiata (Eisenack, 1959)
- Spinachitina suecica (Laufeld, 1967)
- Spinachitina taugourdeaui (Eisenack, 1968)
- Spinachitina tvaerensis Grahn, Nõlvak et Paris, 1996
