= Desmochitina =

Scientific classification
- Domain: Eukaryota
- Kingdom: incertae sedis
- Class: †Chitinozoa
- Order: †Operculatifera
- Family: †Desmochitinidae
- Genus: †Desmochitina; Eisenack, 1931

Extinct genus of marine organisms

Desmochitina is an extinct genus of chitinozoans. It was described by Alfred Eisenack in 1931.

== Species ==
- Desmochitina amphorea Eisenack, 1931
- Desmochitina cocca Eisenack, 1931
- Desmochitina elongata Eisenack, 1958
- Desmochitina erinacea Eisenack, 1931
- Desmochitina grandicolla Eisenack, 1958
- Desmochitina holosphaerica Eisenack, 1968
- Desmochitina juglandiformis Laufeld, 1967
- Desmochitina minor Eisenack, 1931
- Desmochitina nodosa Eisenack, 1931
- Desmochitina ovulum Eisenack, 1962
- Desmochitina papilla Grahn, 1984
- Desmochitina piriformis Laufeld, 1967
- Desmochitina rugosa Eisenack, 1962
