= Ramochitina =

Scientific classification
- Domain: Eukaryota
- Kingdom: incertae sedis
- Class: †Chitinozoa
- Order: †Prosomatifera
- Family: †Lagenochitindae
- Genus: †Ramochitina; Sommer et van Boekel, 1964

Ramochitina is an extinct genus of chitinozoans. It was described by Sommer and van Boekel in 1964.

== Species ==
- Ramochitina angusta (Nestor, 1982)
- Ramochitina cornuta (Laufeld, 1974)
- Ramochitina costata (Umnova, 1981)
- Ramochitina martinssoni (Laufeld, 1974)
- Ramochitina militaris (Laufeld, 1974)
- Ramochitina nestorae Grahn, 1995
- Ramochitina ruhnuensis (Nestor, 1982)
- Ramochitina spinipes (Eisenack, 1964)
- Ramochitina spinosa (Eisenack, 1932)
- Ramochitina swifti (Sutherland, 1994)
- Ramochitina tabernaculifera (Laufeld, 1974)
- Ramochitina uncinata (Laufeld, 1974)
- Ramochitina valbyttiensis (Laufeld, 1974)
- Ramochitina valladolitana (Schweineberg, 1987)
- Ramochitina villosa (Laufeld, 1974)
