= Bursachitina =

Scientific classification
- Domain: Eukaryota
- Kingdom: incertae sedis
- Class: †Chitinozoa
- Order: †Operculatifera
- Family: †Desmochitinidae
- Genus: †Bursachitina; Taugourdeau, 1966

Bursachitina is an extinct genus of chitinozoans. It was described by Taugourdeau in 1966.

== Species ==
- Bursachitina bursa (Taugourdeau et de Jekhowsky, 1960)
- Bursachitina conica (Taugourdeau et de Jekhowsky, 1964)
- Bursachitina nana (Nestor, 1994)
- Bursachitina nestorae Mullins et Loydell, 2001
- Bursachitina umbilicata Vandenbroucke, Rickards et Verniers, 2005
