= Paraconodontida =

Scientific classification
- Kingdom: Animalia
- Phylum: Chordata
- Subphylum: Vertebrata (?)
- Order: †Paraconodontida; Müller, 1962

Subgroups
- †Furnishinacea Miller, 1981; †Westergaardodinidae Müller, 1959; †Furnishinidae Müller & Nogami, 1971

Synonyms
- Paraconodonta; Westergaardodinida Lindström, 1970

Extinct order of chordates

Paraconodonts (Paraconodontida) are an extinct order of probable chordates, closely related or ancestral to euconodonts (true conodonts). The order contains the superfamily Furnishinacea, itself containing the families Westergaardodinidae and Furnishinidae.

Paraconodonts were introduced into the scientific literature by Klaus Müller, who sought out the Cambrian ancestors of conodonts through the 1950s and 1960s and proclaimed success upon the discovery of paraconodont fossils. Like early true conodonts, paraconodont elements were phosphatic fossils which generally had a horn- or tooth-like shape, and some were serrated with multiple cusps. Westergaardodina acquired an even more unusual W- or horseshoe-shaped form.

True conodont 'teeth' have a distinct crown and base tissue, with each component growing independently through the addition of external layers. In contrast, paraconodont 'teeth' have a single main component which only grows downwards via additional sheath-like layers. As a result, the tip of the 'tooth' remains fully exposed and unmodified through its entire lifetime, while the base of the 'tooth' eventually expands into a rimmed cavity.

In the earliest paraconodonts (such as Furnishina and Prooneotodus), the basal cavity is very simple and entirely lacks internal growth. Later paraconodonts are more complex: Problematoconites, for example, has 'cone-filling laminae' (very thin layers which stack up within the basal cavity), while Rotundoconus adds a spherulitic infilling (thicker beady-textured layer) below the 'cone-filling laminae'. This trend of increasing complexity further supports the idea that paraconodonts are ancestral to euconodonts. In fact, the internal structure of Rotundoconus is nearly identical to the base tissue of the early euconodont Granatodontus. In addition, it also demonstrates how conodonts evolved their 'teeth' independently from the enamel-based true teeth of jawed vertebrates.

During the 1970s and early 1980s, paraconodonts were frequently associated with an even more simplistic group of conodont-like Cambrian fossils, the protoconodonts (taxa such as Amphigeisina, Gapparodus, Hertzina, and Protohertzina). Both paraconodonts and protoconodonts were grouped together within the order Paraconodontida in the 1981 Treatise on Invertebrate Paleontology volume on conodonts (Part W revised, supplement 2). Later research found little support for this association, instead arguing that protoconodonts were an unrelated group of invertebrates closer to modern chaetognaths (arrow worms).

== Taxonomy ==
- Superfamily Furnishinoidea Miller, 1981
  - Family Furnishinidae Müller & Nogami, 1971
    - Albiconus Miller, 1980
    - Furnishina Müller, 1959
    - Muellerodus (Miller, 1980)
    - Nogamiconus (Miller, 1980)
    - Proacodus Müller, 1959
    - Problematoconites Müller, 1959
    - Prooneotodus Müller, 1959
    - Prosagittodontus Müller, 1959
    - Proscandodus Müller & Nogami, 1971
  - Family Westergaardodinidae Müller, 1959
    - Westergaardodina Müller, 1959
- incertae sedis:
  - Diaphanodus? Bagnoli, Barnes, & Stevens, 1987
  - Dolabrodus An, 1982
  - Bengtsonella Müller & Hinz, 1991
  - Hunanognathus Dong, 1993
  - Laiwugnathus An, 1982
  - Prodistacodus? An, 1982
  - Rotundoconus? An & Zhang, 1983
  - Serratocambria Müller & Hinz, 1991
  - Shandongodus An, 1982
  - Trolmenia Müller & Hinz, 1991
  - Yongshunella Dong & Bergström, 2001
