= Plectochitina =

Scientific classification
- Domain: Eukaryota
- Kingdom: incertae sedis
- Class: †Chitinozoa
- Order: †Prosomatifera
- Family: †Lagenochitindae
- Genus: †Plectochitina; Cramer, 1964

Extinct genus of chitinozoans

Plectochitina is an extinct genus of chitinozoans. It was described by Fritz H. Cramer in 1964.

== Species ==
- Plectochitina magna (Nestor, 1982)
- Plectochitina nodifera (Nestor, 1980)
- Plectochitina obuti Nestor, 1994
- Plectochitina pachyderma (Laufeld, 1974)
- Plectochitina ralphi Nestor, 1994
- Plectochitina spongiosa (Achab, 1977)
