= Gapparodus =

Furnishinidae Temporal range: Cambrian

Scientific classification
- Kingdom: Animalia
- Phylum: Chordata
- Order: †Paraconodontida
- Family: †Furnishinidae
- Genus: †Gapparodus; Abaimova 1978

Species
- †Gapparodus bisulcatus; †Gapparodus gapparites Yang, Steiner & Keupp 2015

Extinct genus of condonts

Gapparodus is an extinct genus of conodonts in the family Furnishinidae. Gapparodus gapparites is a species of the Early Cambrian of Shuijingtuo Formation in China.
