= Furnishinidae =

Scientific classification
- Kingdom: Animalia
- Phylum: Chordata
- Order: †Paraconodontida
- Family: †Furnishinidae; Müller & Nogami, 1971

Extinct family of jawless fishes

Furnishinidae is an extinct family of paraconodonts.

== List of genera ==
Genera which have placed within Furnishidae include:

- Albiconus Miller, 1980
- Furnishina Müller, 1959
- Gapparodus Abaimova, 1978
- Muellerodus (Miller, 1980)
- Nogamiconus (Miller, 1980)
- Proacodus Müller, 1959
- Problematoconites Müller, 1959
- Prooneotodus Müller, 1959
- Prosagittodontus Müller, 1959
- Proscandodus Müller & Nogami, 1971
