= Furnishina =

Scientific classification
- Kingdom: Animalia
- Phylum: Chordata
- Order: †Paraconodontida
- Family: †Furnishinidae
- Genus: †Furnisina; Müller 1959

Species
- †Furnishina furnishi; †Furnishina holmi Bagnoli & Stouge, 2014; †Furnishina leei Lee 2013; †Furnishina primitiva; †Furnishina wangcunensis Dong & Zhang, 2017

Extinct genus of jawless fishes

Furnishina is an extinct genus of conodonts in the family Furnishinidae from the Cambrian.

The genus name is a tribute to American paleontologist William M. Furnish.
