= Eisenackitina =

Scientific classification
- Domain: Eukaryota
- Kingdom: incertae sedis
- Class: †Chitinozoa
- Order: †Operculatifera
- Family: †Desmochitinidae
- Genus: †Eisenackitina; Jansonius, 1964

Extinct genus of chitinozoans

Eisenackitina is an extinct genus of chitinozoans. It was described by Jansonius in 1964.

== Species ==
- Eisenackitina barrandei Paris et Křiž, 1984
- Eisenackitina causiata Verniers, 1999
- Eisenackitina clunensis Miller, Sutherland et Dorning, 1997
- Eisenackitina dolioliformis Umnova, 1976
- Eisenackitina elongata Eisenack, 1972
- Eisenackitina inanulifera Nestor, 2005
- Eisenackitina intermedia (Eisenack, 1955)
- Eisenackitina invenusta (Wrona, 1980)
- Eisenackitina kerria Miller, Sutherland et Dorning, 1997
- Eisenackitina lagena (Eisenack, 1968)
- Eisenackitina lagenicula (Eisenack, 1971)
- Eisenackitina lagenomorpha (Eisenack, 1931)
- Eisenackitina oviformis (Eisenack, 1972)
- Eisenackitina philipi Laufeld, 1974
- Eisenackitina rhenana (Eisenack, 1939)
- Eisenackitina spongiosa Swire, 1990
