= Klaus J. Müller =

German paleontologist

Klaus Jürgen Müller
- Born: 6 February 1923; Berlin, Germany
- Died: 12 March 2010 (aged 87); Bonn, Germany
- Occupation: Paleontologist

Klaus Jürgen Müller (born 6 February 1923 in Berlin, died 12 March 2010 in Bonn) was a German paleontologist, most famous for the discovery of Orsten-type preservation.

In 1956, he described the Devonian conodont genus Palmatolepis.

In 1959, he described the Cambrian conodont genera Furnishina, Hertzina and Westergaardodina, and the conodont family Westergaardodinidae.

In 1962, he described the conodont order Paraconodontida.

== Awards and tributes ==
In 2003, he was awarded the Pander medal by the Pander Society, an informal organisation founded in 1967 for the promotion of the study of conodont palaeontology.

The conodont genus name Muellerilepis Bardashev & Bardasheva (2013) is a tribute to K.J.Müller. It is replacement generic name for Muellerina Bardashev et Bardasheva, 2012, which is a preoccupied name. The phosphatocopine genus Klausmuelleria is also named after him.
