= Dollymae =

Dollymae Temporal range: Tournaisian

Scientific classification
- Kingdom: Animalia
- Phylum: Chordata
- Infraphylum: Agnatha
- Class: †Conodonta
- Genus: †Dollymae; Hass, 1959

Species
- †Dollymae bouckaerti; †Dollymae hassi; †Dollymae sagittula (type)

Extinct genus of jawless fishes

Dollymae is an extinct genus of conodonts.

== Use in stratigraphy ==
The Tournaisian, the oldest age of the Mississippian (also known as Lower Carboniferous) contains eight conodont biozones, one of which is the zone of Dollymae bouckaerti.
