= Muellerina =

Muellerina may refer to:

- Muellerina (plant), a genus of parasitic shrubs in the family Loranthaceae endemic to Australia
- Muellerina (crustacean), a genus of marine ostracods in the family Hemicytheridae
