= Shoushan stone carvings =

Type of stone carving originating in Fujian Province, China

Shoushan (simplified Chinese: 寿山石; traditional Chinese: 壽山石; pinyin: Shòushān Shí) stone carving is an art originating in Fujian Province (Chinese: 福建省; pinyin: Fújiàn Shěng) in East China.

The stones used in carving are also known as agalmatolite and are mined in the Shoushan village in northern Fujian. This stone is often semi-translucent and can feature vibrant colours. Use of the stone for carving can be traced back as far as the Southern dynasties and have long been used to produce handicrafts and later on in the Ming dynasty, seals.

== See also ==
- Shou (character), meaning longevity
