= Westergaardodinidae =

Scientific classification
- Kingdom: Animalia
- Phylum: Chordata
- Order: †Paraconodontida
- Family: †Westergaardodinidae; Müller, 1959

Genera
- †Westergaardodina

Extinct family of jawless fishes

Westergaardodinidae is an extinct family of conodonts in the order Paraconodontida.

It consists of the genus Westergaardodina.
