= Soom Shale =

Late Ordovician lagerstatte formation in South Africa

- Stratigraphic range: Hirnantian
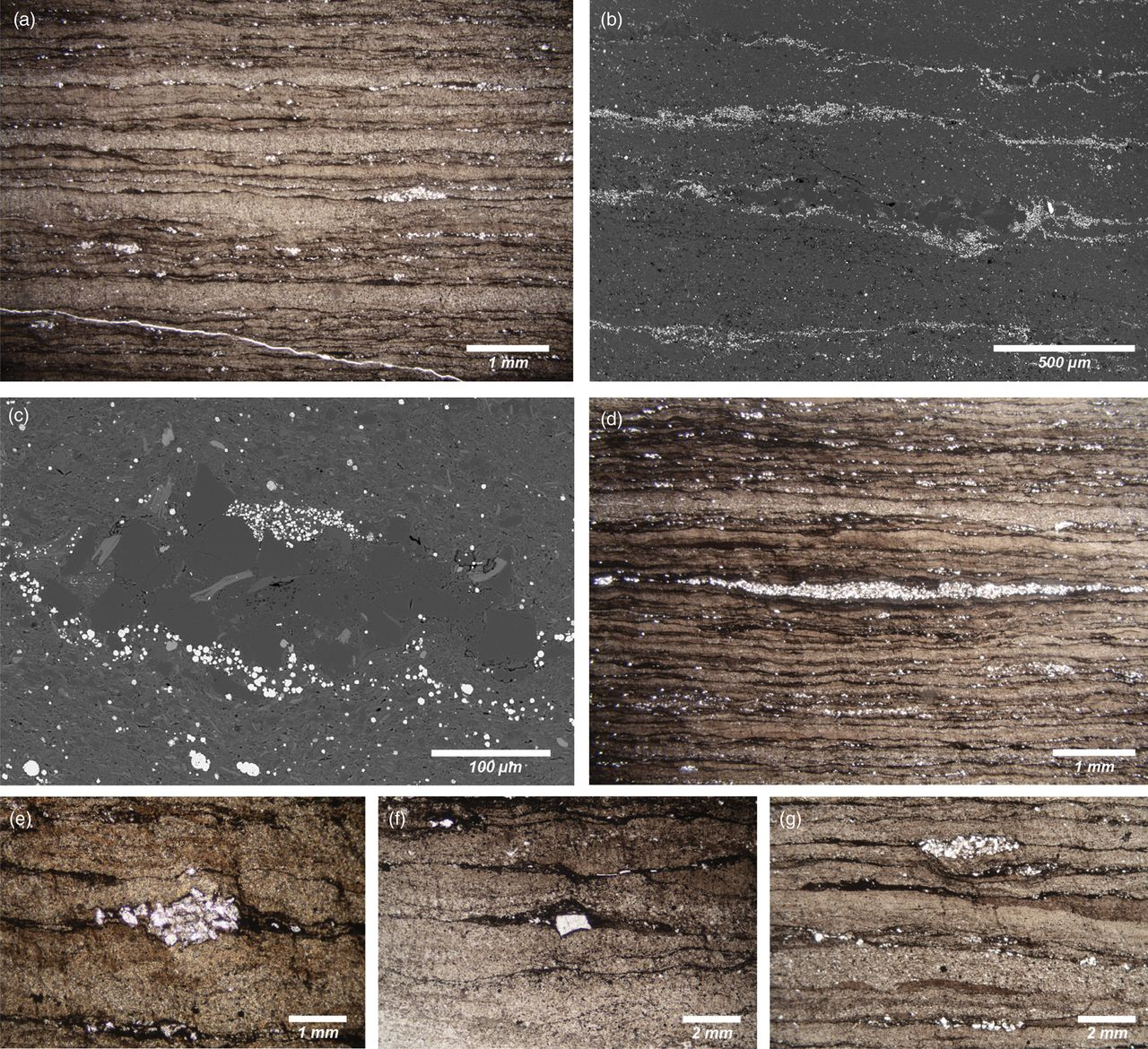
- Typical lithological features of the Soom shale, note the frequent beds of white quartz
- Unit of: Cederberg Formation, Table Mountain Group
- Underlies: Disa Siltstone
- Overlies: Pakhuis Tillite
- Thickness: 10–15 m (33–49 ft)

Lithology
- Primary: Shale

Location
- Coordinates: 33.0°S 19.0°E
- Approximate paleocoordinates: 28.5°S 153.7°E
- Region: Western Cape
- Country: South Africa
- Soom Shale (South Africa)

The Soom Shale is a member of the Late Ordovician (Hirnantian) Cederberg Formation (Table Mountain Group) in South Africa, renowned for its remarkable preservation of soft-tissue in fossil material. Deposited in still waters, the unit lacks bioturbation, perhaps indicating anoxic conditions.

It overlies the Pakhuis tillite and is overlain by the Disa Siltstone.

It contains typical Ordovician microfossils, such as chitinozoa, acritarchs and spores, and its shelly fauna is also typical of this time period.

Its macrofauna comprises pelagic organisms that sank rapidly to a barren sea floor. These include brachiopods, eurypterids, conodonts, nektaspids, trilobites, a lobopodian and orthoconic cephalopods.

== Environment of formation ==
The environment of deposition is considered to be anoxic and occasionally euxinic cold bottom waters, as indicated by the lack of bioturbation and most epibenthic fauna, besides a small amount of transiently colonizing brachiopods during temporary oxic conditions. It was deposited in the immediate aftermath of the Hirnantian glaciation, the most likely primary cause of the Late Ordovician mass extinction.

== Preservation ==
The preservation of fossils in the Soom Shale is the opposite of that of normal fossil deposits. Things that in typical preservation conditions are not preserved in the fossil record like soft tissue are preserved in exquisite detail. While hard parts (exoskeleton, etc.) that are normally preserved in the fossil record are demineralized, and are therefore by comparison poorly preserved, usually being preserved in the form of a mould. There is almost no taphonomic distortion, with little evidence of transport, current alignment and no evidence of scavenging. The process of preservation for soft tissues is under debate, but possibly could involve replacement by aluminosilicates, but this could just be an artifact of diagenesis and metamorphism.

== Biota ==
Color key
Taxon	Reclassified taxon	Taxon falsely reported as present	Dubious taxon or junior synonym	Ichnotaxon	Ootaxon	Morphotaxon

Notes
Uncertain or tentative taxa are in small text; ~~crossed out~~ taxa are discredited.

Genus	Type of organism	Images
Promissum	Conodont	
Notiodella	Conodont	
Onychopterella	Eurypterid	
Soomaspis	Liwiid Nektaspid	
Keurbos	Enigmatic euarthropod	
Mucronaspis	Dalmanitid Trilobite	
Soomicaris	Archaeostracan Phyllocarid	
Myodoprimigenia	Myodocope Ostracod	
Palaeoglossa	Obolid Brachiopod	
Trematis	Trematid Brachiopod	
Kosoidea	Discinid Brachiopod	
Plectothyrella	Rhynchonellid Brachiopod	
Siphonacis	Incertae sedis	
Undescribed Agnathan	Jawless fish	
Undescribed Lobopodian	Lobopodian	
