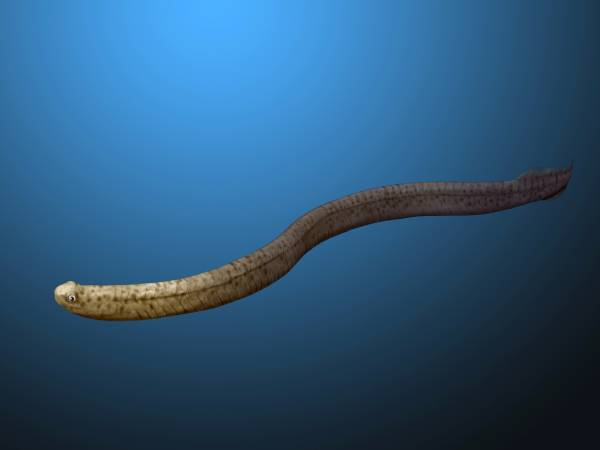

Scientific classification
- Kingdom: Animalia
- Phylum: Chordata
- Infraphylum: Agnatha
- Class: †Conodonta
- Family: †Balognathidae
- Genus: †Promissum; Kovacs-Endrody, 1986
- Species: †P. pulchrum

Binomial name
- †Promissum pulchrum Kovacs-Endrody, 1986

= Promissum =

Promissum Temporal range: Upper Ordovician

Genus of Conodont

Promissum is an extinct genus of conodonts, primitive chordates, that lived during the Upper Ordovician period.

A conodont, Promissum had a primitive mouth under its eyes with mineralized teeth, which are both typical for conodonts. It had a primitive backbone and probably looked like a small eel or large worm, lacking any kind of fins except for perhaps a small one on the tail. It was relatively large for a conodont, reaching about 40 cm (16 inch) in length.

Well-preserved specimens were discovered in the Soom shale of South Africa in 1994.

Promissum was probably capable of maintaining a cruising speed, but not of bursts of speed.
