= Westergaardodina =

Westergaardodina Temporal range: middle Cambrian-lower Ordovician

Scientific classification
- Kingdom: Animalia
- Phylum: Chordata
- Order: †Paraconodontida
- Family: †Westergaardodinidae
- Genus: †Westergaardodina; Müller, 1959

Species
- †Westergaardodina asinina Bagnoli & Stouge, 2014; †Westergaardodina brevidens; †Westergaardodina quadrata; †Westergaardodina matsushitai; †Westergaardodina grandidens; †Westergaardodina lui; †Westergaardodina ani; †Westergaardodina bohlini; †Westergaardodina cf. calix; †Westergaardodina proligula; †Westergaardodina ligula; †Westergaardodina cf. behrae; †Westergaardodina tricuspidata; †Westergaardodina bicuspidata; †Westergaardodina amplicava; †Westergaardodina nogamii; †Westergaardodina moessebergensis; †Westergaardodina curvata; †Westergaardodina latidentata; †Westergaardodina excentrica; †Westergaardodina obliqua; †Westergaardodina cf. ahlbergi; †Westergaardodina auris; †Westergaardodina communis; †Westergaardodina concamerata; †Westergaardodina dimorpha; †Westergaardodina fossa; †Westergaardodina gigantea; †Westergaardodina horizontalis; †Westergaardodina kleva; †Westergaardodina microdentata; †Westergaardodina polymorpha; †Westergaardodina procera; †Westergaardodina prominens; †Westergaardodina sola; †Westergaardodina tetragonia; †Westergaardodina wimani

Extinct genus of jawless fishes

Westergaardodina is a species-rich genus of spine, U or W-shaped paraconodont known from Middle Cambrian to Lower Ordovician strata.

== Use in stratigraphy ==
Paibi, a village in Hunan, China, is the location of the Global Boundary Stratotype Section and Point (GSSP) which marks the boundary between the Miaolingian and Furongian epochs of the Cambrian Period on the geologic time scale. The GSSP was ratified by the International Union of Geological Sciences in late 2003. It established the first formally agreed upon subdivision of the Cambrian. Markers which occur near the boundary include the first appearance of Westergaardodina proligula and the Steptoean positive carbon isotope excursion, a large positive shift in carbon-13 isotopes.
