= Alfred Eisenack =

German paleontologist

- Born: 13 May 1891; Altfelde, West Prussia
- Died: 19 April 1982 (aged 90); Reutlingen
- Education: University of Jena, University of Königsberg
- Scientific career
- Fields: Paleontology
- Workplaces: University of Tübingen

Alfred Eisenack (born 13 May 1891 in Altfelde, West Prussia, died 19 April 1982 in Reutlingen) was a German paleontologist. He was a pioneer of micropaleontology and palynology. His botanical and mycological author abbreviation is "Eisenack".

Eisenack took his photographs using a Leitz monocular microscope, to which he attached a box camera fashioned from a biscuit tin and furnished with glass negatives. He first described chitinozoans and many species of acritarchs, dinoflagellate cysts and graptolites. In 1973 he became an honorary member of the Paleontological Society.

== Biography ==
Eisenack went to school in Elbing and graduated in 1911 at the University of Jena and in 1913 at the University of Königsberg and began a Ph.D. thesis with Sven Tornquist about the stratigraphy of the Portlandium on Garda Lake. He was not able to finish, as his studies were interrupted by the First World War. He volunteered, and after the Battle of Łódź he was taken as a prisoner of war by the Russian army to Chita in Siberia. There he was able to improve the skills of other captive geologists (including Pontoppidan). Eisenack's return was delayed even after the Armistice. Later on he had fond memories of this time. In 1920 he worked for a time as a chemist, and returned by ship via Vladivostok to Germany.

He then studied geology with Karl Erich Andrée in Königsberg, and subsequently took a qualifying exam as a teacher. From 1925 to 1940 he worked at the Bessel High School in Königsberg, where he taught science and mathematics. He also researched microfossils from the Scandinavian Silurian and Ordovician. He began to publish papers in 1930. In 1942 he became a lecturer in Königsberg. In 1945, he was once again in Soviet captivity, in East Prussia.

After returning from Siberia in 1951, he became visiting professor at the University of Tübingen, after he had become a full-time teacher at the Oberreutlinger trade school in Reutlingen. In Tübingen, he was academically very active and also had several students. Two of his students were Hans Gocht and Gerhard Alberti - refugees from the Communist regime of East Germany; another was Karl W. Klement.

Eisenack used pre-War methods of extraction of palynomorphs from limestones. Eisenack's work extended from the Silurian into the Ordovician and Cambrian. Though studies of Jurassic and Oligocene palynomorphs were resumed by Eisenack (,) and work on Aptian (late Lower Cretaceous) forms initiated, his principal work thereafter was on the Palaeozoic fauna.

== Dinoflagellate cyst work ==
Eisenack described ( ) the first Jurassic assemblages of dinoflagellate cysts to have been reported since their first brief mention by Ehrenberg. Eisenack also described assemblages from the Oligocene amber-bearing sediments of East Prussia, now Kaliningrad, Russia, and he reported what he considered to be "hystrichospheres" from German Silurian deposits.

== Acritarch work ==
Eisenack long resisted the use of the term Acritarch, proclaiming "die Einheitlichkeit der Hystrichospharen" - the unity of the hystrichospheres (1963a, b). In 1969 he finally conceded that he had been wrong, and adopted the name 'acritarch'.

== Chitinozoans ==
It was Eisenack who discovered, in those same Baltic Silurian sediments, the first of the usually flask-shaped microfossils which he called chitinozoans. Eisenack considered initially that these were protozoans, perhaps related to the thecamoebians (Rhizopoda). Later he suggested an affinity to the Euglenoidea, a group of freshwater flagellated protozoans. Much later, he and others considered that these fossils were actually gastropod egg cases.
