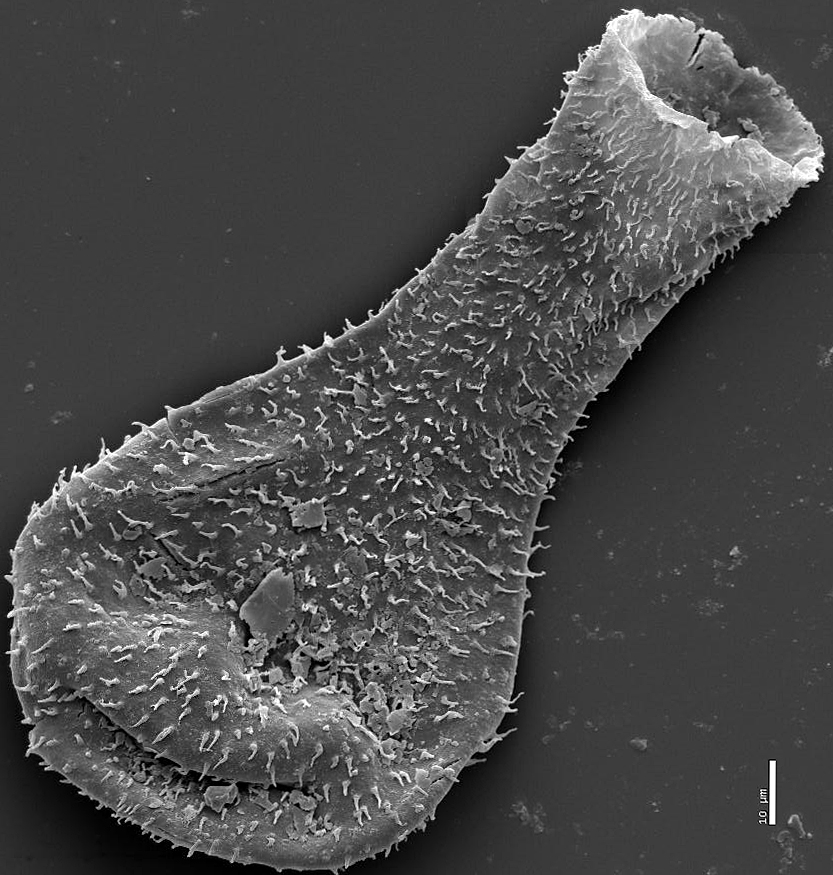
- Scanning electron micrograph of a late Silurian chitinozoan from the Burgsvik beds, showing its flask-like shape

Scientific classification
- Domain: Eukaryota
- Clade: incertae sedis
- Class: †Chitinozoa; Eisenack 1931

Orders
- Operculatifera; Prosomatifera

= Chitinozoan =

Chitinozoan Temporal range: 510–358 Ma Cambrian Stage 5 - Famennian (latest Devonian)

Group of marine microfossils

Chitinozoa (singular: chitinozoan, plural: chitinozoans) are a group of flask-shaped, organic walled marine microfossils produced by an as yet unknown organism. Common from the Ordovician to Devonian periods (i.e. the mid-Paleozoic), the millimetre-scale organisms are abundant in almost all types of marine sediment across the globe. This wide distribution, and their rapid pace of evolution, makes them valuable biostratigraphic markers.

Their bizarre form has made classification and ecological reconstruction difficult. Since their discovery in 1931, suggestions of protist, plant, and fungal affinities have all been entertained. The organisms have been better understood as improvements in microscopy facilitated the study of their fine structure, and it has been suggested that they represent either the eggs or juvenile stage of a marine animal. However, recent research has alternatively suggested that they represent the test of a group of protists with uncertain affinities.

Chitinozoan ecology is also open to speculation; some may have floated in the water column, where others may have attached themselves to other organisms. Most species were particular about their living conditions, and tend to be most common in specific paleoenvironments. Their abundance also varied with the seasons.

== Anatomy ==
Chitinozoa range in length from around 50 to 2000 micrometres. They appear dark to almost opaque when viewed under an optical microscope. Their anatomy is based around the broad chamber, a radially symmetrical region involving a central cavity encased by two layers of a chitin-like substance. The chamber narrows towards the main opening (the aperture), though a circular plug prevents direct contact between the central cavity and its surroundings. This plug may be called an operculum (if it lies at the tip of the aperture) or a prosome (if it lies deep within the narrowed region or neck). The rim of the aperture, known as the collarette, often has a distinctive form or texture.

The base of the chitinozoan lies at the opposite end from the aperture. The base may involve various ornamentation derived from the internal layer. The edge of the base (basal margin) may extend into a sharp radial plate, the carina. Alternatively, it could send out large spines or branches, known as processes. In chitinozoans which attach to substrates or each other in large chains, the center of the base is augmented with apical structures which project down to assist attachment.

External ornamentation is often preserved on the surface of the fossils, in the form of hairs, loops or protrusions, which are sometimes as large as the chamber itself. The range and complexity of ornament increased with time, against a backdrop of decreasing organism size. The earliest Ordovician species were large and smooth-walled; by the mid-Ordovician a large and expanding variety of ornament, and of hollow appendages, was evident. While shorter appendages are generally solid, larger protrusions tend to be hollow, with some of the largest displaying a spongy internal structure. However, even hollow appendages leave no mark on the inner wall of the organisms: this may suggest that they were secreted or attached from the outside. There is some debate about the number of layers present in the organisms' walls: up to three layers have been reported, with the internal wall often ornamented; some specimens only appear to display one such wall layer. The multitude of walls may indeed reflect the construction of the organism, but could be a result of the preservational process.

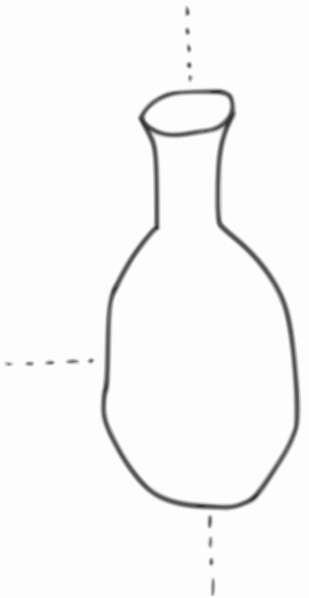
Morphological terms relating to chitinozoans, after Jenkins (1970)

"Immature" or juvenile examples of chitinozoans have not been found; this may suggest that either they did not "grow", that they were moults (unlikely), or that the fossilisable parts of the organism only formed after the developmental process was complete. However, in 2019 a study found that morphological variation of specimens of Desmochitina likely represented a growth series.

Many chitinozoans are found as isolated fossils, but chains of multiple tests, joined from aperture to base, have been reported for all genera. Very long chains twist into helical (spring-shaped) forms. Occasionally, clusters or condensed chains are found, packed in an organic "cocoon".

== Classification ==
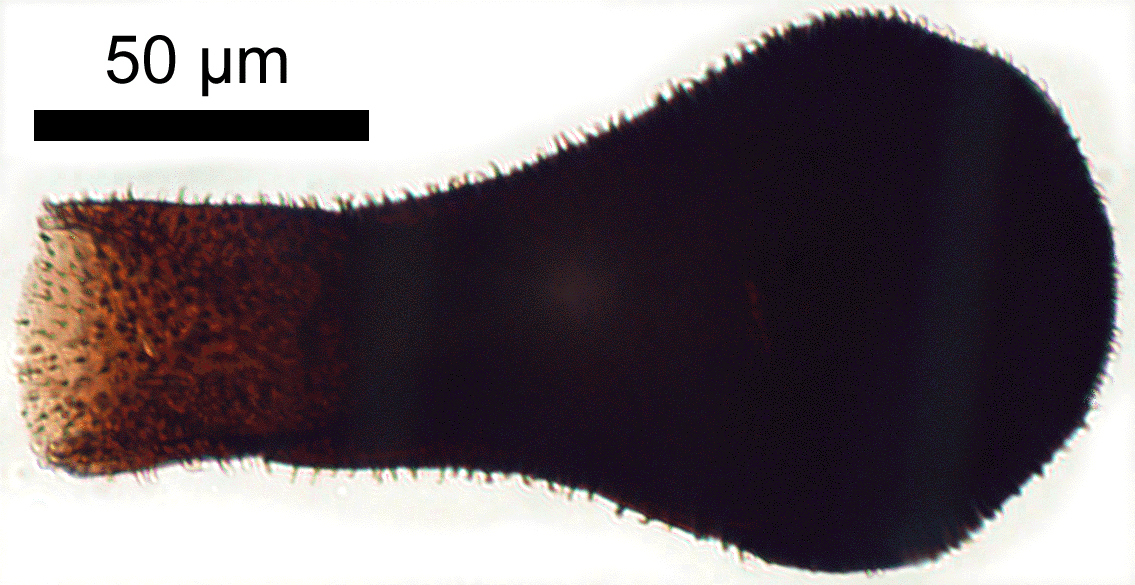
Scanning electron microscope images, such as that in the taxobox, are far more illuminating than those taken in transmitted light.

Alfred Eisenack's original description of the chitinozoans placed them in three families, spanning seven genera, based on morphological grounds. Further genera were identified, at first on an annual basis, as time progressed. Since its publication in 1931, Eisenack's original classification has been much honed by these additional discoveries, as well as advances in microscopy. The advent of the scanning electron microscope in the 1970s allowed the improved detection of surface ornamentation which is hugely important in identification—as can be appreciated by a comparison of the images on this page. Even the light microscope image here is of far greater quality than could have been achieved earlier in the century, using poorly preserved specimens and less advanced microscopes.

The original three families proposed by Eisenack represented the best classification possible with available data, based largely on the presence or absence of chains of organisms and the chamber's shape. The orders were subsequently revised to conform better to Linnean taxonomy, placing related organisms more closely together. This was made possible as scientific advances permitted the identification of distinctive traits in organisms across Eisenack's groups. Features of the base and neck, the presence of spines, and perforations or connections are now considered the most useful diagnostic features.

Chitinozoans are placed into two orders. The order Operculatifera includes those with an operculum over the aperture and no distinct neck. The order Prosomatifera includes those with a clearly discernable neck and an internal prosome.

== Affinities ==
=== Young graptolites ===
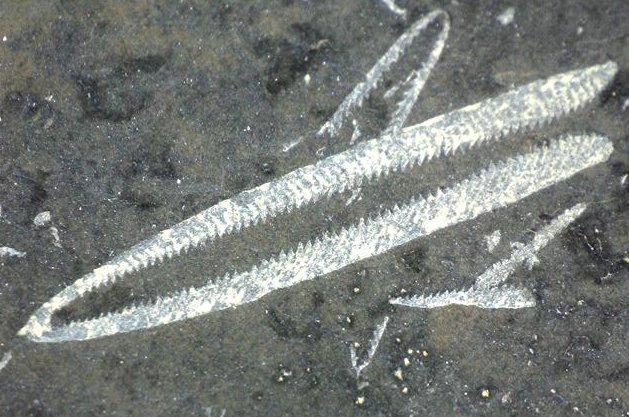
Chitinozoa may have been immature graptolites.

The graptolites are colonial organic walled fossils which also occurred from the Ordovician to the Devonian; only part of their life cycle is known and it is not clear how they reproduced. It has been suggested that the Chitinozoa may represent the pre-sicula stages of graptolites—the period between the colony's sexual reproduction, and the formation of a new colony. This hypothesis appears to be supported by the co-occurrence of graptolite and chitinozoan fossils, whose abundances appear to mirror one another. The similar chemical composition of the fossils has been seized by both sides of the argument. Proponents suggest that the use of the same chemical framework is an indicator that the two may be related. However, this factor means that situations favouring the preservation of one will also tend to preserve the other—and the preparation techniques used to extract the fossils will also favour or disfavour the two groups equally. Therefore, the apparent co-occurrence of the two fossils may merely be an artifact of their similar composition. The hypothesis struggles to explain the continuing abundance of chitinozoans after the middle Devonian, when graptolites became increasingly rare.

=== Eggs ===
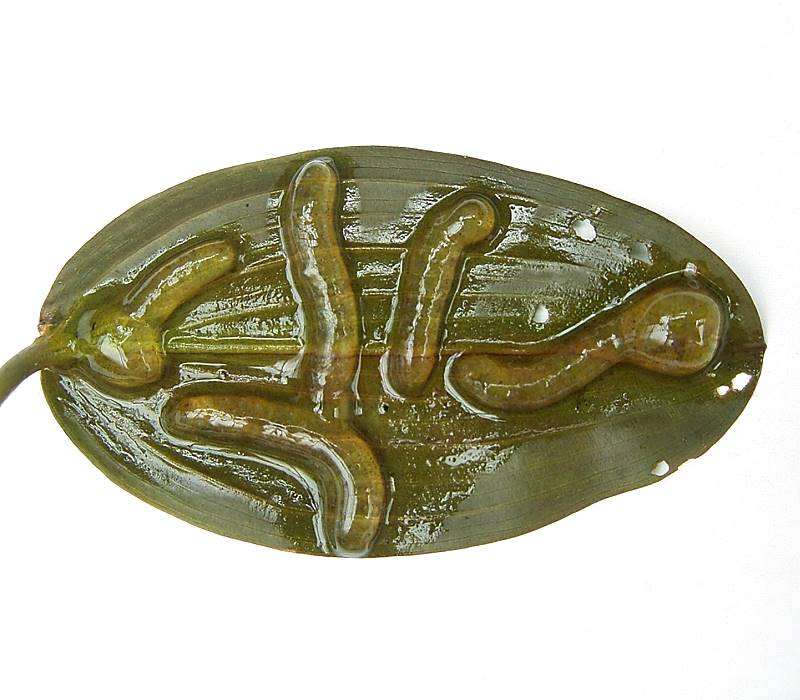
Chitinozoa might represent gastropod egg sacs.

The test of the Chitinozoa was fixed—there was no scope for any parts of it to move or rotate. This makes it seem likely that the tests were containers, to protect whatever was inside—whether that was a "hibernating" or encysted organism, or a clutch of hatching eggs. There are several arguments behind an association of the chitinozoans with annelids or gastropods, and it is not impossible that the chitinozoans are a convergent phenomenon laid by both groups. In fact, the spirally coiled nature of chitinozoan chains has been used to suggest that they were laid by a spirally coiled organism, such as the gastropods; were this inference true, uncoiled chains could be attributed to the (straight) annelid worms or other organisms.

Recent excavations of the Soom Shale, an Ordovician konservat-lagerstätten in South Africa, have yielded chitinozoans alongside a wide range of other organisms. It has been suggested that if whatever organism created the Chitinozoa was fossilisable, it would be present in the Soom biota—from which gastropods and graptolites are notable in their absence. Most organisms present in the shale can be ruled out for a variety of reasons, but polychaete worms, Promissum conodonts and orthocone cephalopods remain as likely candidates. However, further evidence connecting chitinozoans to any of these groups is circumstantial at best.

=== Protists ===
Alfred Eisenack's original guess was that the Chitinozoa were amoebae, specifically the rhizopod order Testacea, since similar chitin-based tests were produced by the extant members of this group. However, the chemistry of these tests differs from that of the fossils, and modern Testacea are almost exclusively fresh-water—an extremely different environment. Within a year, he had abandoned this initial idea.

Arguments put forwards by Obut (1973) proposed that the organisms were one-celled "plants" similar to the dinoflagellates, which would now be grouped into the Alveolata. However, as mentioned previously, spines and appendages are attached from the exterior of the vessel: only animals have the cellular machinery necessary to perform such a feat. Further, no analogy for the cocoon envelope can be found in this kingdom.

The cyst forms of a particular group of ciliates, the tintinnids have been suggested to be affiliated to chitinozoans.

In 2020, exceptionally preserved remains of chitinozoans were described, showing the remains of smaller tests within larger ones, suggesting asexual reproduction.

== Ecology ==
It is not immediately clear what mode of life was occupied by these improbably shaped fossils, and an answer only becomes apparent after following several lines of reasoning.

The fossils' restriction to marine sediments can be taken as sound evidence that the organisms dwelt in the Palæozoic seas—which presents three main modes of life:

- Infaunal – living within the sediment—the "burrowers"
- Benthic – dwelling upon the sea floor, perhaps anchored in place—the "sitters"
- Pelagic – free-floating in the water column—the "drifters"

An infaunal mode of life can be quickly ruled out, as the fossils are sometimes found in alignment with the depositing current; as nothing attached them to the bottom, they must have fallen from the water column.

The ornament of the chitinozoans may cast light on the question. Whilst in some cases a defensive role—by making the vessel larger, and thus less digestible by would-be predators—seems probable, it is not impossible that the protrusions may have anchored the organisms to the sea floor. However, their low-density construction makes this unlikely: perhaps more plausible is that they acted to attach to other organisms. Longer spines also make the organisms more buoyant, by decreasing their Rayleigh number (i.e. increasing the relative importance of water's viscosity)—it is therefore possible that at least the long-spined chitinozoans were planktonic "floaters". On the other hand, the walls of some chitinozoans were probably too thick and dense to allow them to float.

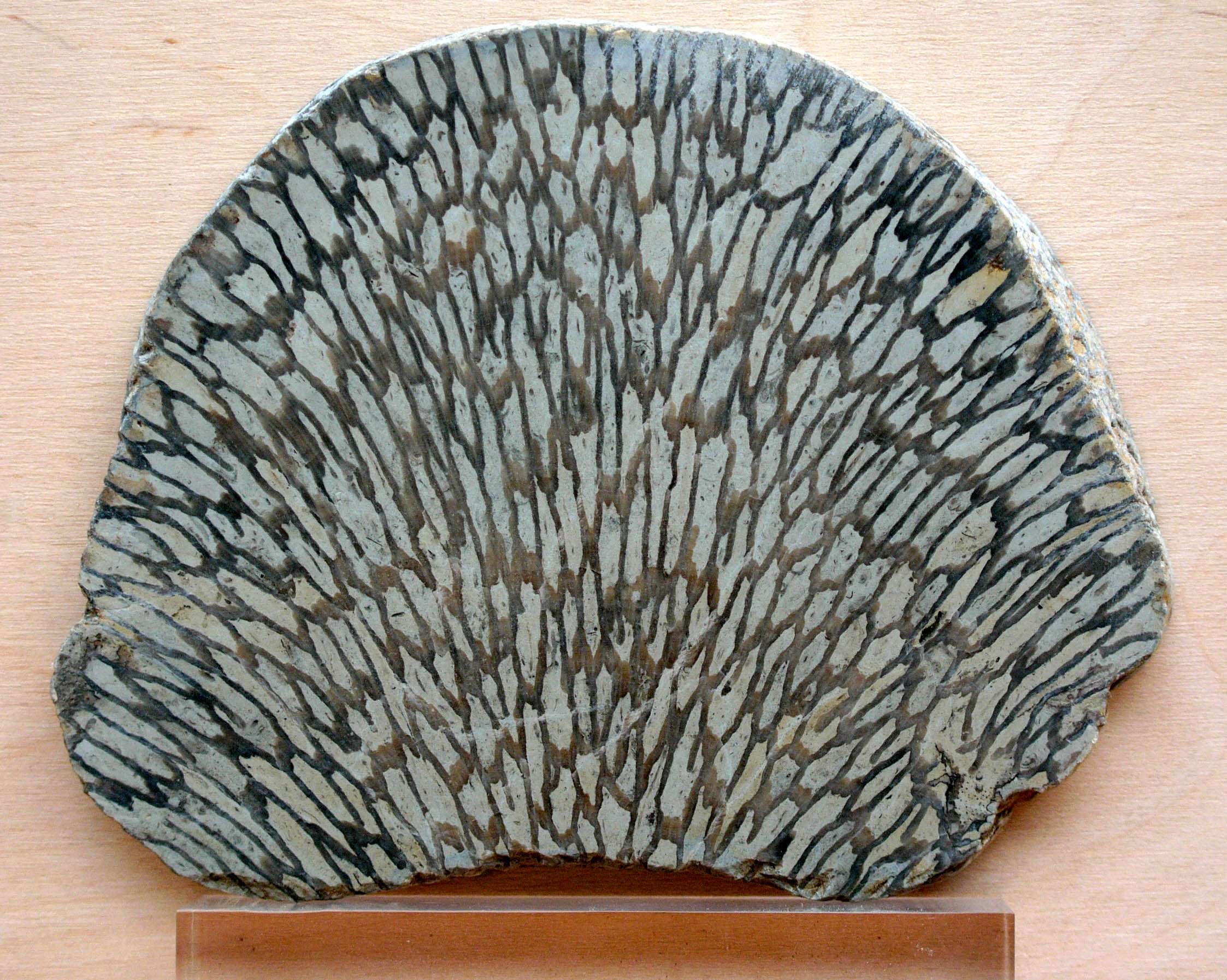
Silurian fossil coral from Gotland

Whilst little is known about their interactions with other organisms, small holes in the tests of some chitinozoans are evidence that they were hosts to some parasites. Although some forms have been reinterpreted as "pock-marks" caused by the disintegration of the diagenetic mineral pyrite, the clustering of cylindrical holes around the chamber—where the flesh of the organism was likely to be concentrated—is evidence for a biological cause. Corals in Gotland with daily growth markings have been found in association with abundant chitinozoans, which allow the detection of seasonal variation in chitinozoan abundance. A peak in abundance during the late autumn months is observed, with the maxima for different species occurring on different dates. Such a pattern is also observed in modern-day tropical zooplankton. The diversity of living habits is also reflected by the depth of water and distance from the shore. Different species are found in highest abundance at different depths. While deeper waters around 40 km from the shoreline are generally the optimal environment, some species appear to prefer very shallow water. On the whole, chitinozoans are less abundant in turbulent waters or reef environments, implying an aversion to such regimes when alive, if it is not an effect of sedimentary focusing. Chitinozoans also become rarer in shallower water—although the reverse is not necessarily true. They cannot survive freshwater input.

== Stratigraphic application ==
Since Alfred Eisenack first recognised and named the group in 1930, the Chitinozoa have proven incredibly useful as a stratigraphic markers in biostratigraphy during the Ordovician, Silurian and Devonian periods. Their utility is due to the rapidity of their morphological evolution, their abundance—the most productive samples bearing almost a thousand tests per gram—and the easy identification (due largely to the large variation in shapes) and short lifetimes (<10 million years) of most species. They are also widely distributed and appear in a variety of marine depositional settings, making correlation easier; better still, they can often be recognised in even quite strongly metamorphosed rocks. However, convergence of morphological form to similar environments sometimes leads to the mistaken identification of a species in several areas separated by vast differences in space and time, but sharing a similar depositional environment; clearly, this can cause major problems if the organisms are interpreted as being the same species. Aside from the acritarchs, chitinozoans were the only reliable means of correlating palæozoic units until the late 1960s, when the detailed study of conodonts and graptolites fully unleashed their stratigraphic potential.

The oldest known chitinozoans appear to be phosphatized remains tentatively referred to the genus Eisenackitina. They were recovered from the Middle Cambrian (Stage 5)–age Gaotai Formation, more than 20 million years before the group is found elsewhere in the Ordovician. Chitinozoans appear to have become extinct at the end of the Devonian; rare Carboniferous and Permian remains may represent reworked fossils or fungal spores.
