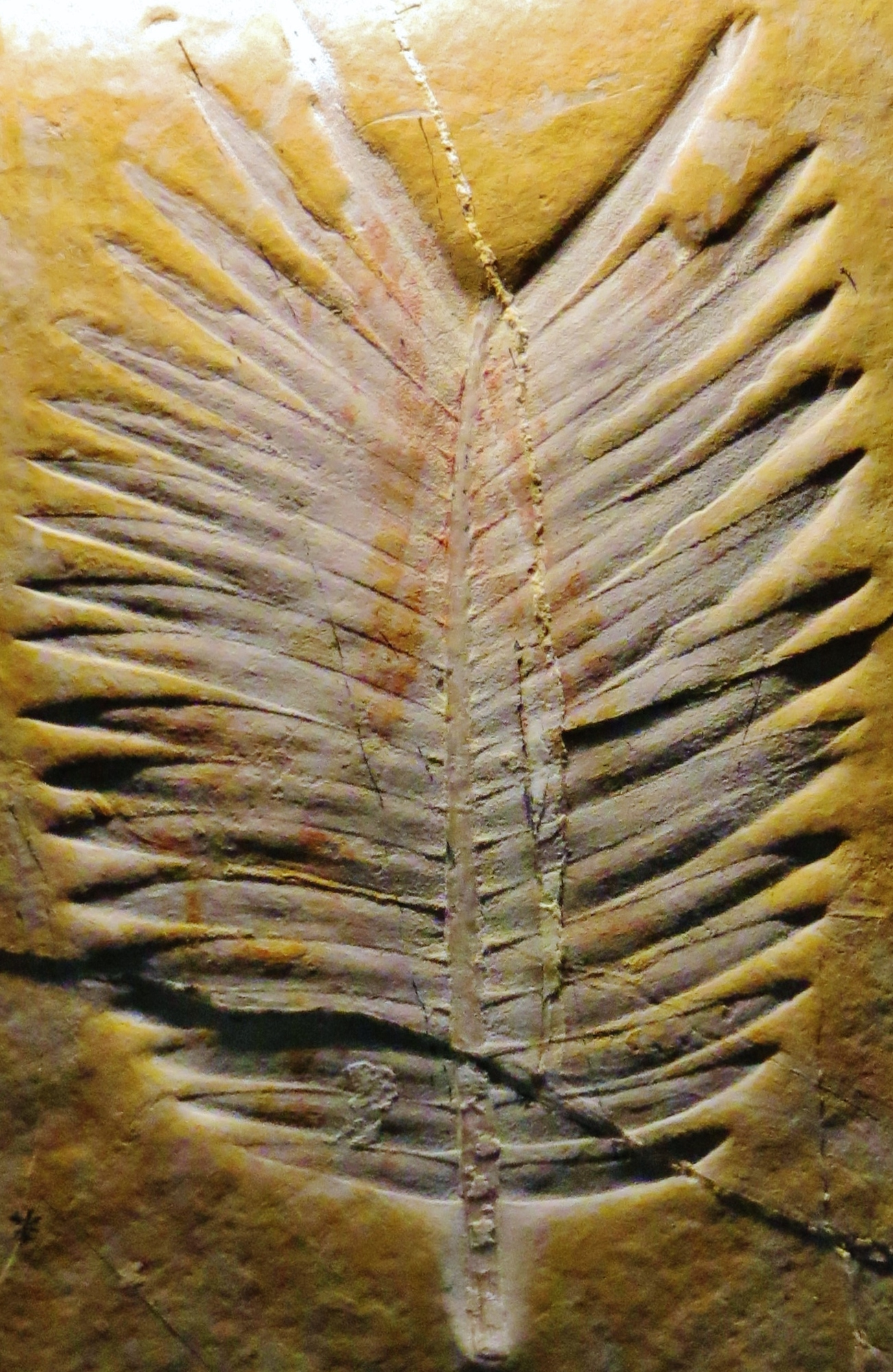

Scientific classification
- Kingdom: Plantae
- Clade: Tracheophytes
- Order: †Bennettitales
- Family: †Williamsoniaceae
- Genus: †Zamites; Brongniart, 1828

Species
- See text

= Zamites =

Zamites Temporal range: Early Triassic-Eocene ~242–37 Ma

Extinct genus of bennettitalean foliage

Zamites is an extinct genus of plants in the family Williamsoniaceae that lived from the Triassic to the Eocene. This plant is reported in the Mesozoic from North and South America, Europe, Asia, Africa, and Antarctica, and in the Cenozoic only in North America.

== Naming ==
As explained by Zijlstra & van Konijnenburg-van Cittert (2020), the application of the genus name Zamites has over time drifted away from Brongniart's original concept to one where the species Z. gigas (Lindl. & Hutton) Morris has been treated as a de facto type, to the degree that none of Brongniart's four original species would now be assigned to it, instead being allocated to Otozamites and possibly elsewhere; this includes Z. bucklandii, designated as the type of Zamites by Pfeiffer in a publication dating from 1871-1875, but now (as O. bucklandii) the type of Otozamites. Technically, unless otherwise addressed, this renders Otozamites a synonym of Zamites and would mean that Z. gigas plus all the species recognisably closer to it than to Z. bucklandii would require a new genus name. Zijlstra & van Konijnenburg-van Cittert chose to attempt to circumvent this situation by proposing that Zamites should be re-defined based on designating Z. gigas as a new type to replace Z. bucklandii, a proposal that was recommended for acceptance by the Nomenclature Committee for Fossils in 2022.

== Description ==
The leaf blade is lanceolate to linear-lanceolate, and its dimensions vary between 50 and 60 centimeters. The pinnules are symmetrically clustered at the base and are connected obliquely to the upper surface of the rachis by this base. The apex of the pinnule is obtuse (sharp). The veins emerge from the clustered part and are divergent from each other. They are dichotomized once or more times and cut the pinnule edge. The midribs can extend to the end of the pinnule. It is associated with the ovulate cone Williamsonia and male cone Weltrichia.

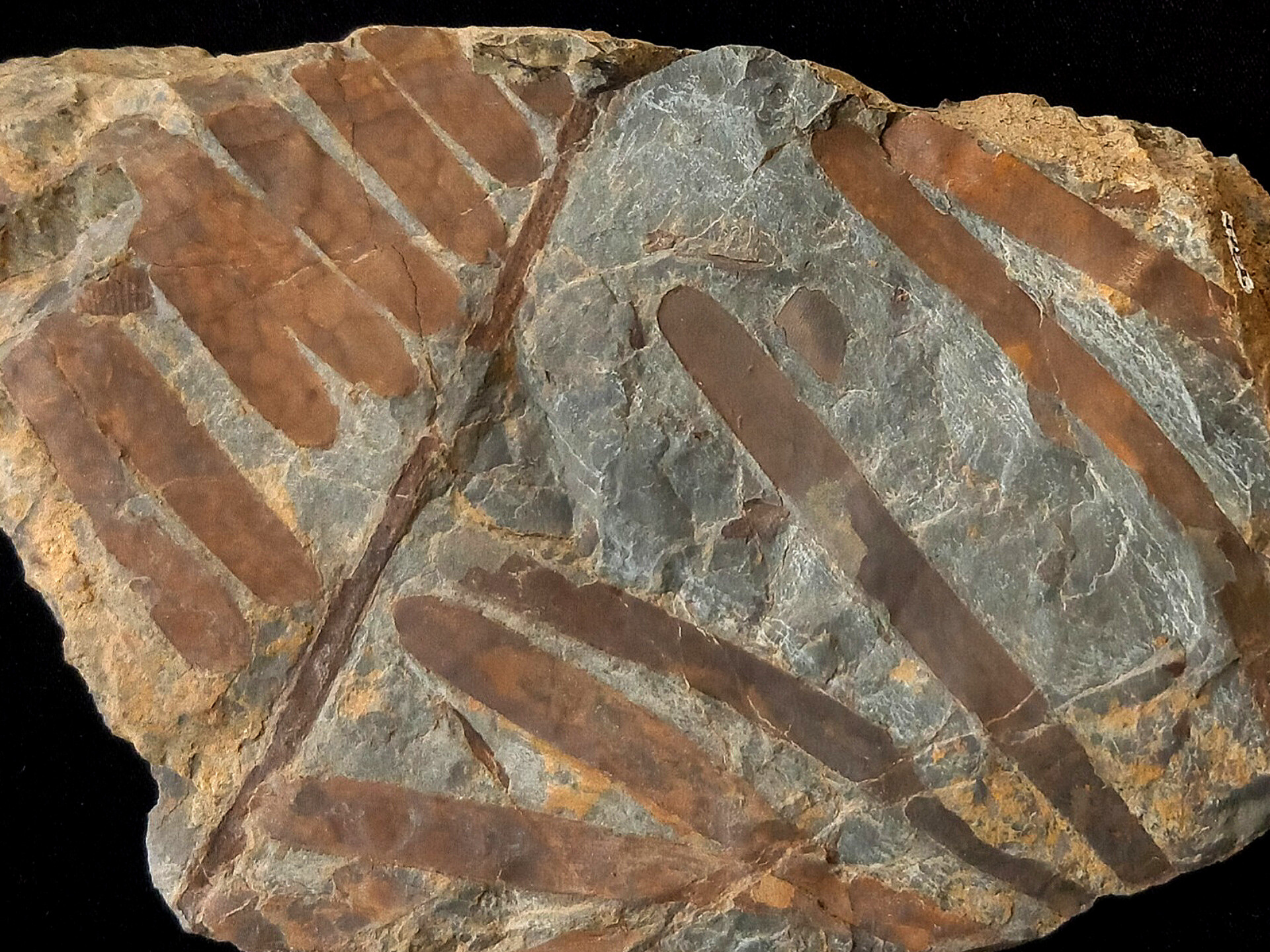
Zamites persica, from the Triassic of Iran. The leaves are attached to the rachis at an angle of about 20°. The rachis is more than half the size of the smaller leaf and is rectangular in cross section. The leaf is round at first but becomes pointed at the end.Leaf veins gather at the beginning and end.

== Taxonomy ==
It was erected as a form taxon for leaves that superficially resembled. Due to the presence of the reproductive structure of Williamsonia and Weltrichia, this genus is placed in the family Williamsoniaceae.

== Species ==
This genus includes 32 confirmed species, some of which are listed below.

- Z. alaskana
- Z. apertus
- Z. arcticus
- Z. bayeri
- Z. brevipennis
- Z. buchianus
- Z. californica
- Z. carruthersii
- Z. corderi
- Z. dowellii
- Z. manoniae
- Z. mariposana
- Z. montanensis
- Z. nicolae
- Z. notokenensis
- Z. occidentalis
- Z. ovalis
- Z. pennsylvanicus
- Z. persica
- Z. powelli
- Z. subfalcatus
- Z. tatianae
- Z. truncatus
- Z. wendyellisae
- Z. yorkensis
- Z. feneonis

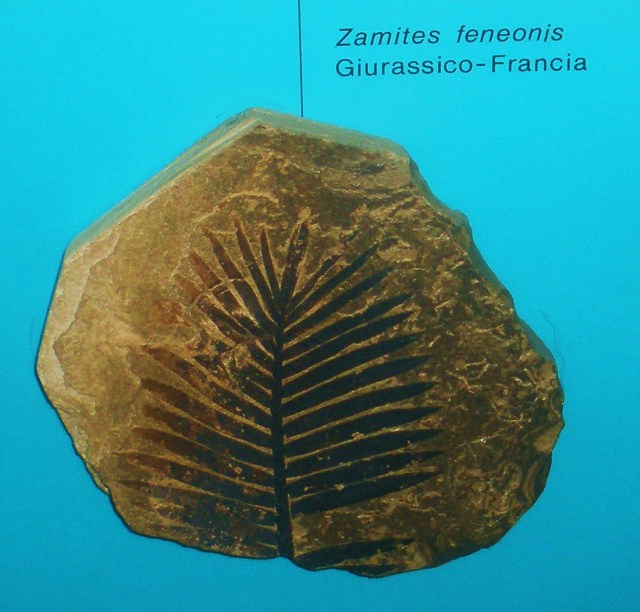
Zamites feneonis

== Distribution ==
Fossils of Zamites have been found in:

Triassic (to Jurassic)

Antarctica, Austria, China, France, Germany, Honduras, Hungary, Italy, Japan, Mexico, Romania, Iran, Tajikistan, Ukraine, and the United States (New Mexico, North Carolina, Utah, Virginia, Virginia/North Carolina).

Jurassic (to Cretaceous)

Antarctica, Argentina, Azerbaijan, Belarus, Chile, China, Colombia (Valle Alto Formation, Caldas), Egypt, France, Georgia, Germany, Iran, Italy, Japan, Kazakhstan, Mexico, Mongolia, Portugal, Romania, the Russian Federation, Serbia and Montenegro, Switzerland, Tajikistan, Turkey, Ukraine, the United Kingdom, and the United States (Montana, Wyoming).

Cretaceous

Canada (Alberta, British Columbia), Ecuador, Japan, Mexico, South Africa, Spain, and the United States (Montana, Virginia, Wyoming).

Eocene

United States (California)
