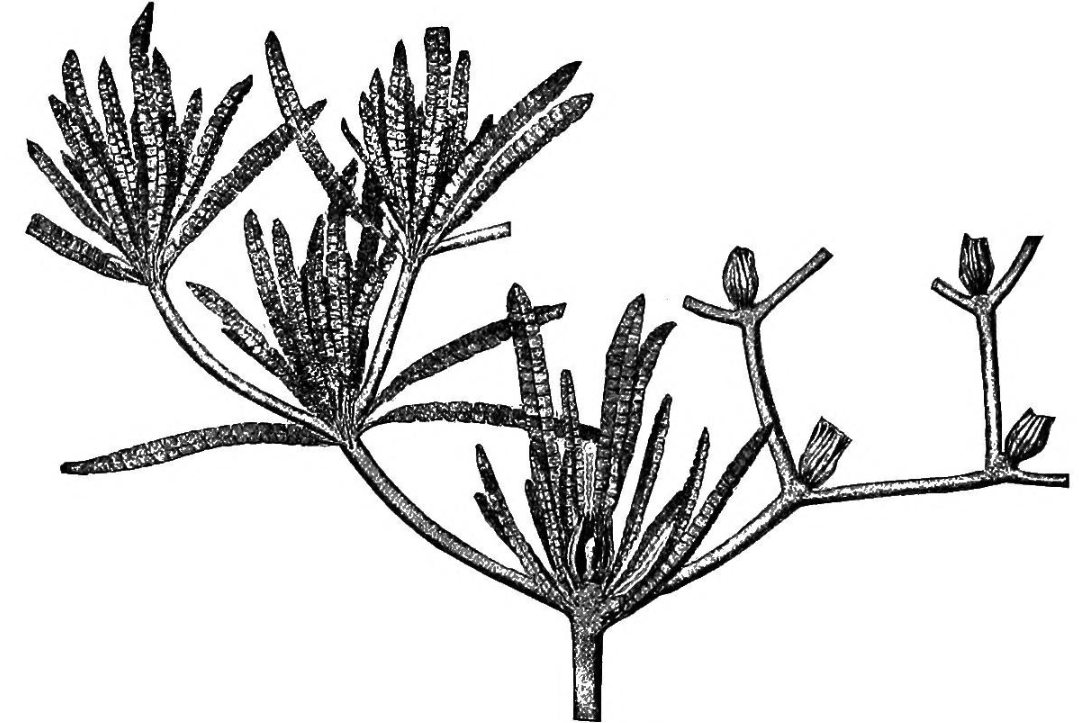
- Restoration of Wielandiella
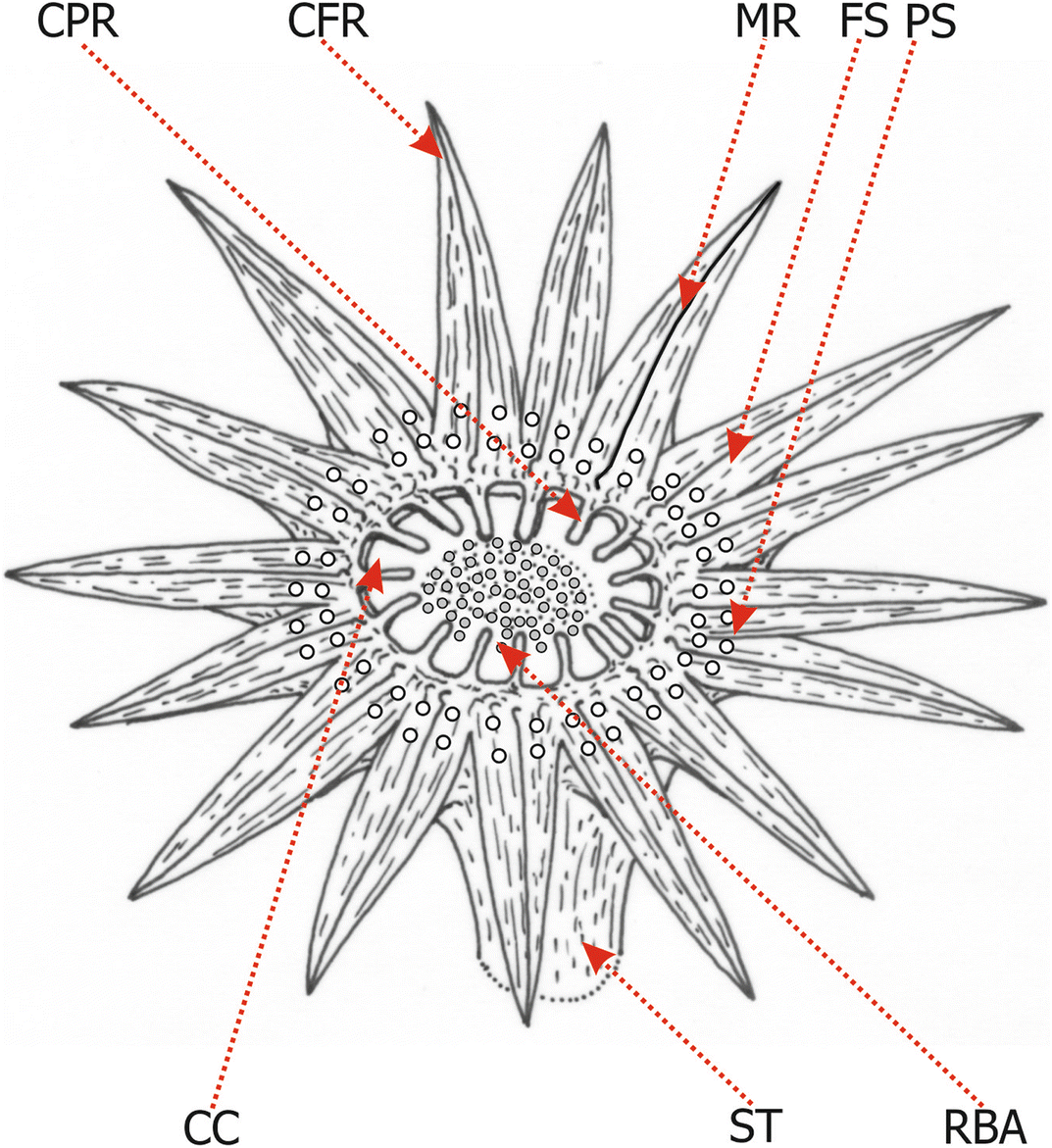
- Diagram of Weltrichia, a male reproductive structure

Scientific classification
- Kingdom: Plantae
- Clade: Tracheophytes
- Order: †Bennettitales
- Family: †Williamsoniaceae (Carruthers) Nathorst, 1913

Genera
Axis Taxa
- Bucklandia (stem)
- "Sahnioxylon" (wood)
Foliage Taxa
- Anomozamites (leaf)
- "Coreanophyllum" (leaf)
- Cycadolepis (bract)
- Dictyozamites (leaf)
- Eoginkgoites (leaf)
- Moltenia (leaf)
- Nilssoniopteris (leaf)
- "Nipponoptilophyllum" (leaf)
- Otozamites (leaf)
- Pterophyllum (leaf)
- Ptilophyllum (leaf)
- Zamites (leaf)
Reproductive Structure Taxa
Ovule-bearing Structures:
- Bennetticarpus
- Bennettitolepis
- Fredlindia
Monosporangiate/Ovulate Cones:
- Vardekloeftia
- Wielandiella
- Williamsonia
Bisporangiate/Bisexual Cones:
- Amarjolia
- Bennetticarpus
- Williamsoniella
Seeds:
- Bysmatospermum
Pollen Organs:
- Haitingeria
- Leguminanthus
- Wonnacottia
Pollen Cones:
- Bennettistemon
- Ontheanthus
- Welsbergia
- Weltrichia
- Williamsonianthus
- Wonnacottia
Pollen:
- Bennettitaepollenites
- Bennettiteaepollenites
Whole-plant Taxa
- Ischnophyton
- Kimuriella
- Monanthesia
- Ohaniella
- Pterophyllum
- Wielandiella
- Williamsoniella coronata

= Williamsoniaceae =

Williamsoniaceae Temporal range: Triassic–Cretaceous

Extinct family of plants

Williamsoniaceae is a family within the Bennettitales, an extinct group of seed plants. Members of this family are believed to have been around two meters tall and with widely serrate leaves along a central stem. Reproductive organs of the Williamsoniaceae have varied widely in the fossil record but almost all have been found to be borne on stalks emerging from a ring of leaves.

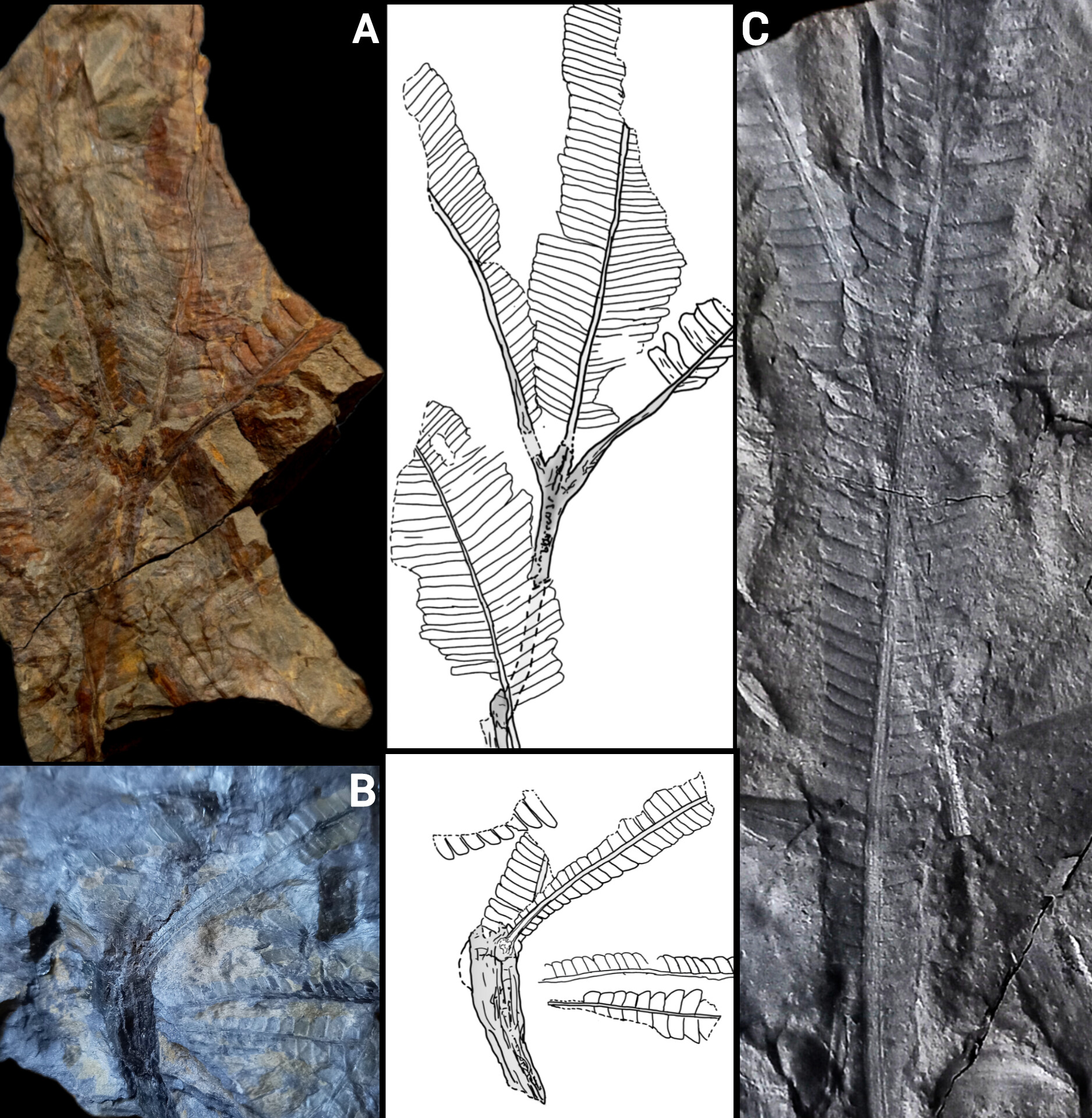
Fossils and schematic diagram of Pterophyllum bavieri from the Late Triassic (Rhaetian) of northern Iran, Shemshak Group, A and B: leaves attached to a branch C: complete leaf

== Reproduction ==
This family is different from Cycadeoidaceae by having the presence of cones leaving the major axis and lateral branches associated with a long peduncle covered by bracts. Some of this family reproduce by sporangia and others only produce ovule or pollen sacs.
