= Ekblom =

Ekblom may refer to:

- Annette Ekblom (born 1956), English actress
- Axel Ekblom (1893–1957), Swedish sport shooter
- Elisabeth Ekblom (born 1958), former professional tennis player from Sweden
- Emil Ekblom (born 1994), Norwegian football striker
- Fredrik Ekblom (born 1970), Swedish race car driver from Kumla
- Helena Ekblom (1790–1859), Swedish writer and preacher
- Thérèse Ekblom (1867–1941), Swedish botanical and zoological illustrator
- Tommy Ekblom (born 1959), retired long-distance runner from Finland
- Ulla Ekblom (born 1943), retired Swedish athlete
