= Thérèse Ekblom =

Swedish illustrator

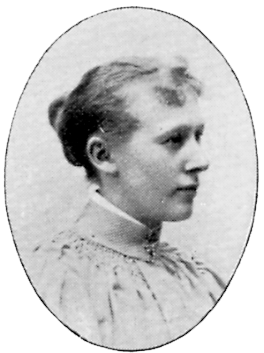
- Ekblom in a 1901 publication

Thérèse Ekblom (1867–1941) was a Swedish botanical and zoological illustrator. She often collaborated with her husband, Axel Richard Ekblom (1858–1914). Ekblom was born Lovisa Teresia Jansson, in Stockholm, Sweden, to a family of artists. Her father and brothers were scene painters at the Royal Swedish Opera. Ekblom attended the Academy of Art in Stockholm, where she met her husband. They married in 1895 and had five children.

While pursuing their studies, the Ekbloms worked with Veit Brecher Wittrock, Professor at the Bergius Botanic Garden. They painted watercolors of species that Professor Wittrock was investigating.

From the 1890s, the Ekbloms worked in various departments at the Swedish Museum of Natural History and for botanists at the botanical garden.

After the death of artist Carl Axel Hedelin in 1894, Ekblom succeeded him to work on a project creating pencil illustrations of plant fossils from Iceland being studied by paleobotanist Alfred Gabriel Nathorst. She worked with Nathorst on illustrations and photography until his death in 1921.

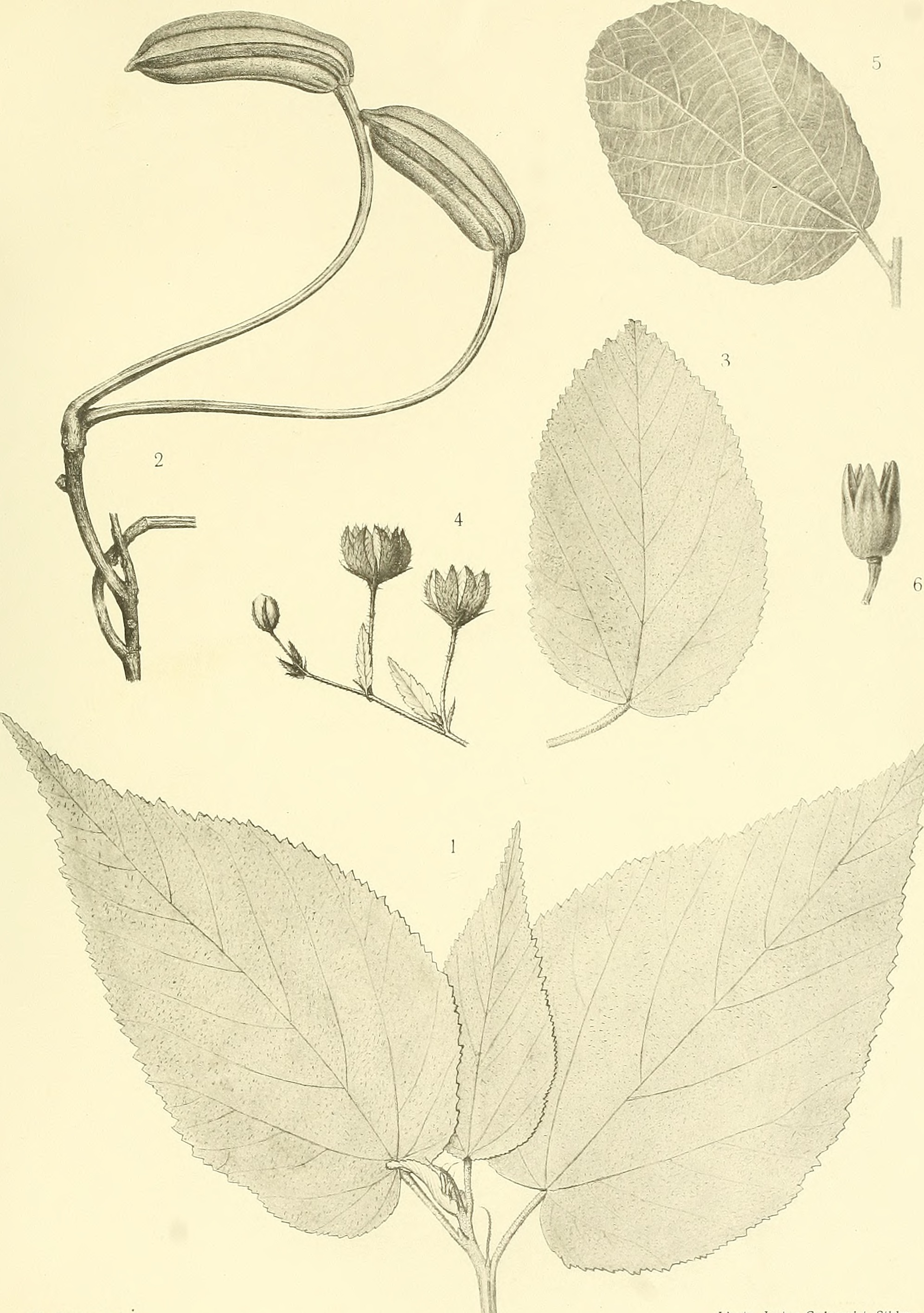
Botanical illustrations, 1907

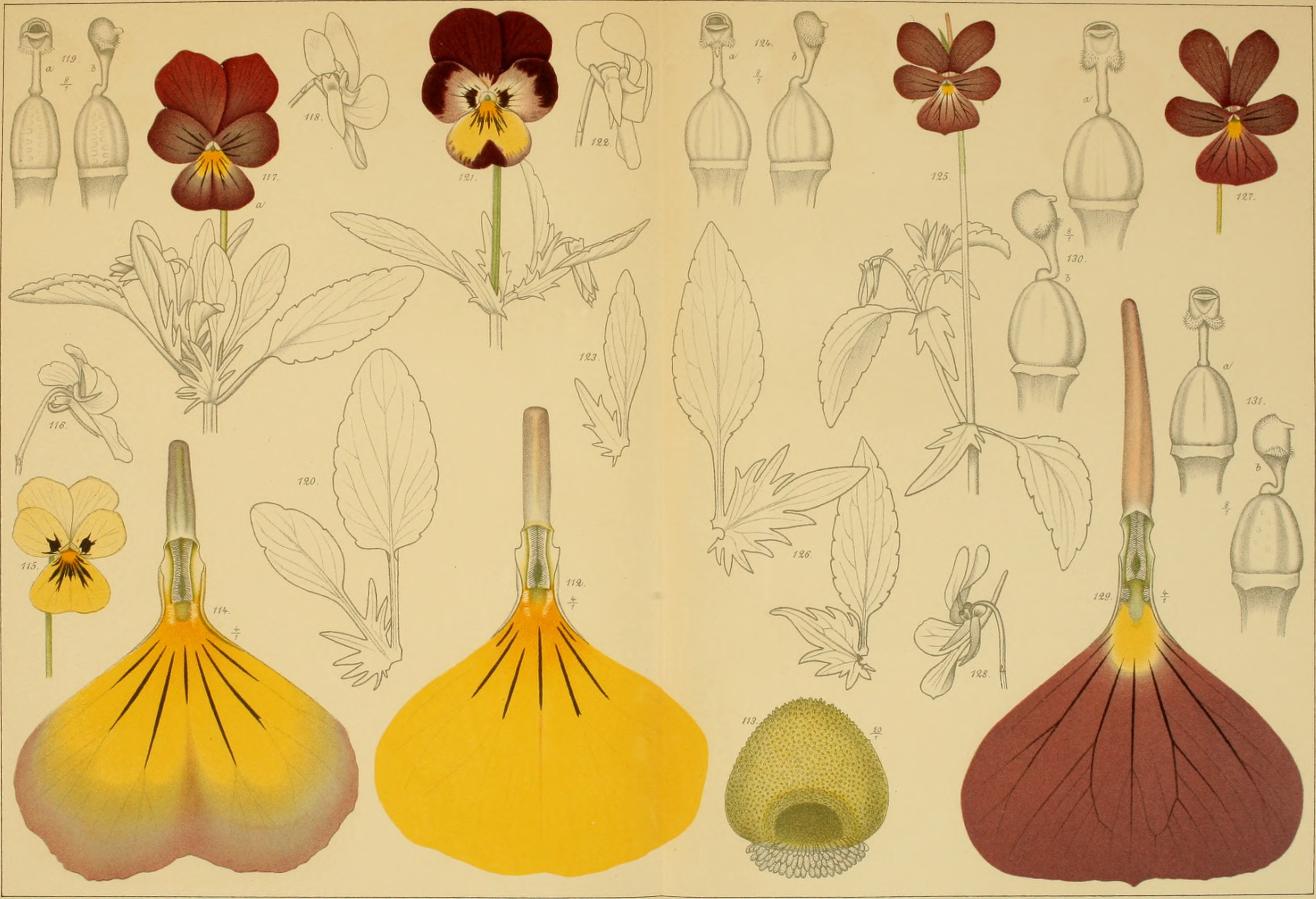
Violets co-illustrated by the Ekbloms, 1897

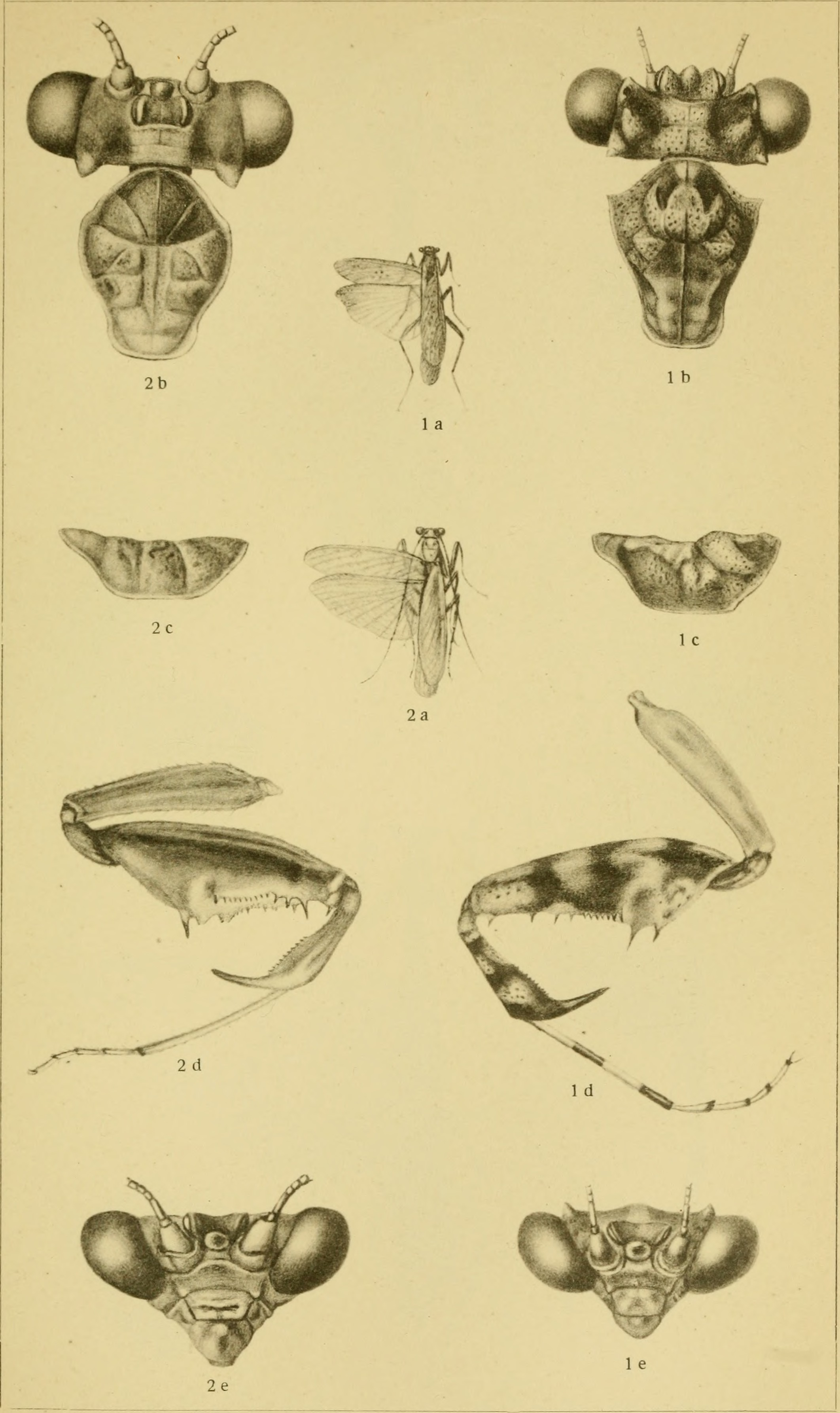
Mantis illustrations, 1907

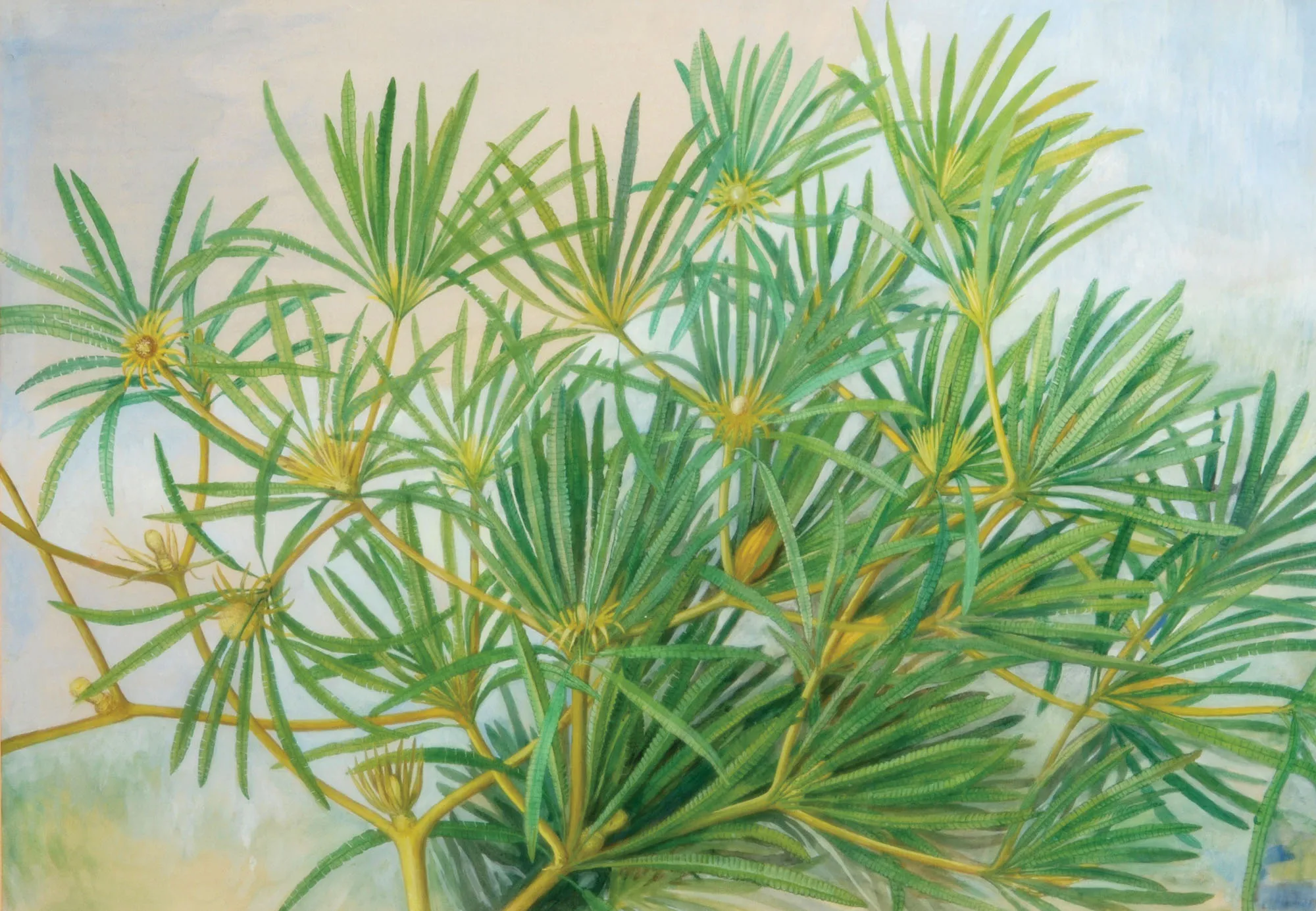
Restoration of a member of Williamsoniaceae (Bennettitales), 1916

== Selected works ==
- Osborn, Herbert. (1924). "Neotropical Homoptera of the Carnegie Museum." Illustrated by Thérèse Ekblom. In Annals of the Carnegie Museum. Vol. 15. pp. 383–462.
- Sjöstedt, Yngve. (1917). "Results of Dr. E. Mjöberg's Swedish scientific expeditions to Australia 1910-1913. 16 Odonaten." Illustrated by Thérèse Ekblom. In Arkiv för zoologi. Vol. 11. pp. 1–44.
- Drake, Carl J., and Margaret Eva Poor Hurd. (1937). "The South American Tingitidae (Hemiptera) described by Stål." Illustrated by Thérèse Ekblom. In Memoirs of the Carnegie Museum, Vol. 11, Issue 5, pp. 301–314.
