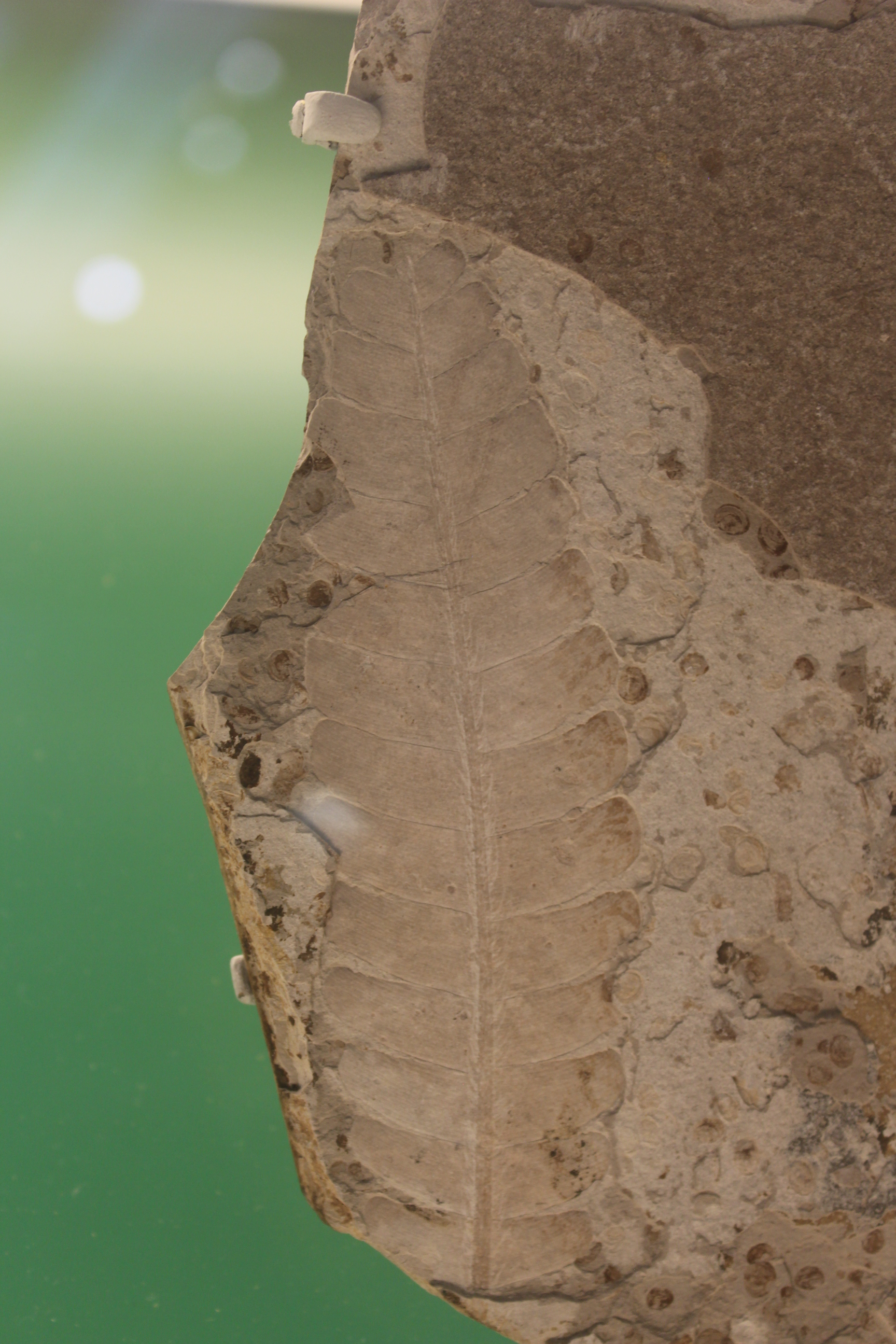
- W. villosa specimen (CNU-PLA-NN-2006-251), National Museum of Natural History

Scientific classification
- Kingdom: Plantae
- Clade: Tracheophytes
- Order: †Bennettitales
- Family: †Williamsoniaceae
- Genus: †Wielandiella; Nathorst 1910

Species
- Wielandiella angustifolia (type); Wielandiella villosa

= Wielandiella =

Wielandiella Temporal range: Rhaetian–Middle Jurassic

Extinct genus of bennettitalean plant

Wielandiella is an extinct genus of bennettitalean shrub known from the Late Triassic (Rhaetian) of Europe and Greenland, and the Middle Jurassic of China.

== Description ==
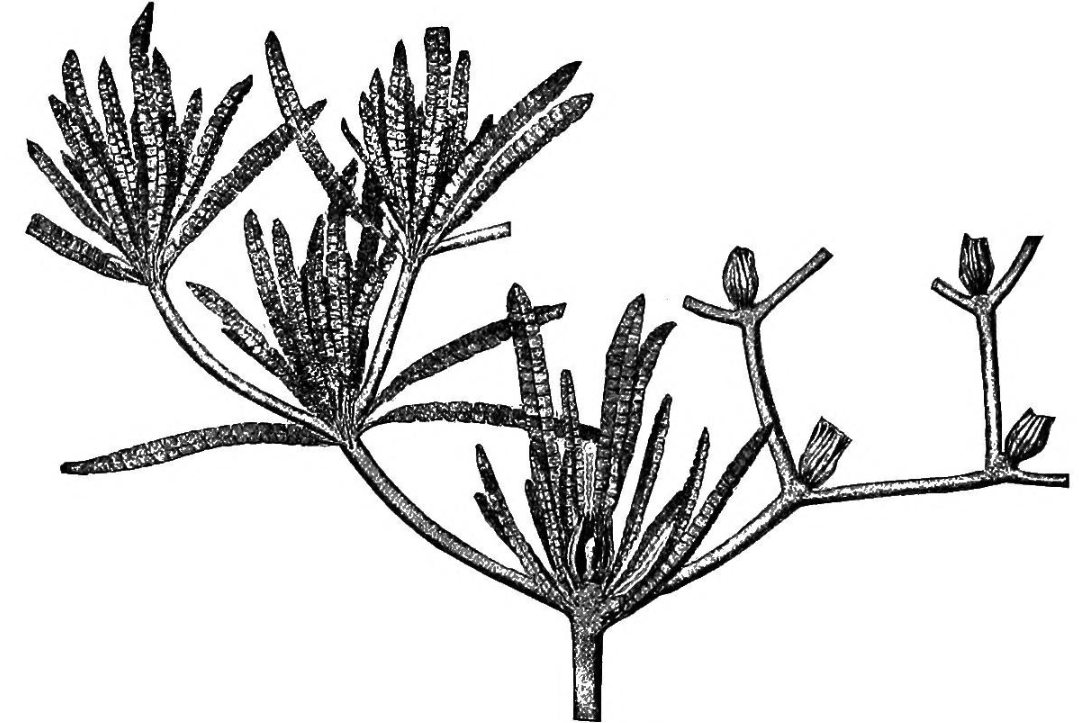
Illustration from 1916 showing divaricate branching pattern

Wielandiella is a whole plant concept, which grew as woody shrubs with divaricately branching axes. The leaves are of Anomozamites type, and are arranged in whorls at the ends of the axes. In W. villosa, the leaves are covered in trichomes (hair like structures). The leaves were gradually shed on the lower branches over the course of growth, leaving persistent leaf scars. The reproductive structures grew at the termination of the axes. While the reproductive structures were previously interpreted as bisexual (i.e. having the male and female structures on a single organ) this interpretation is now thought to be erroneous, with the male and female structures being separate. It is unclear whether the plants were monoecious or dioecious. The microsporangiate structure is poorly known, though isolated specimens assigned to the genus Bennettistemon may represent it. The mature seed cone is likely represented by the genus Vardekloeftia. The ovulate cone is spherical to ovoid, with a central elongate pear-shaped receptacle, which bears interseminal scales and interspersed ovuliferous structures. The micropyles of the ovules extend above the surface of the cone. The cone is surrounded by scale leaf bracts, which extend above the cone.

== Taxonomy ==
The type species W. angustifolia was originally named as a species of Williamsonia in a small note by Alfred Gabriel Nathorst in 1880, based on an ovulate cone collected in the 1860s from near Höör in Skane in southern Sweden. In 1902 Nathorst published a more full description of the whole plant. In 1909, he created the genus Wielania to accommodate the plant, with the name being in honour of George Reber Wieland, who had done important work on Bennettitales. He later amended the genus to Wielandiella a year later, due to Wielandia being occupied by another plant. In 2015, Anomozamites villosa from the Middle Jurassic of Inner Mongolia, China, which had been described in 2012, was reassigned to the genus. While historically assigned to its own family the Wielandiellaceae, today it is usually assigned to the Williamsoniaceae.

== Distribution ==
The type species Wielandiella angusifolia is known from the latest Triassic (Rhaetian) of Greenland (Jameson Land), Sweden (Höör Sandstone) and southern Germany. Leaves of the same morphology as the species have also been reported from equivalently aged strata in the Donetsk Basin in Ukraine, Iran, and China. Wielandiella villosa is known from the Daohugou Bed in Inner Mongolia, China, probably dating to the late Middle Jurassic.

== Ecology ==
Wielandiella is interpreted to have grown in lowland habitats prone to disturbance, such on the shores of lakes and on floodplains.
