= Eoginkgoites =

Eoginkgoites Temporal range: Late Triassic

Scientific classification
- Kingdom: Plantae
- Clade: Tracheophytes
- Order: †Bennettitales
- Family: †Williamsoniaceae
- Genus: †Eoginkgoites; Bock 1952

Type species
- Eoginkgoites sectoralis Bock 1952

Species
- E. davidsonii; E. gigantea; E. sectoralis; E. sydneyi

Extinct genus of seed plants

Eoginkgoites is an extinct form genus of bennettitalean leaves from the Late Triassic of North America. Despite its palmate (hand-shaped) appearance similar to some early ginkgo species, it belongs to a different gymnosperm order, the Bennettitales. The leaf is deeply segmented into five to seven narrow, club-shaped lobes (pinnae or leaflets) which twist around a very short rhachis. This leads to an overall fan-shaped leaf (similar to a ginkgo but much more strongly segmented) situated at the end of a long petiole (leaf stalk). The leaf has paracytic stomata (with subsidiary cells laterally flanking the guard cells) and veins which strongly branch and lead to a marginal vein at the edge of each leaflet. These structural traits are all shared with benettitaleans. Williamsonia carolinensis, an ovule-bearing bennettitalean cone, has been found closely associated with Eoginkgoites leaves, seemingly confirming its benettitalean identity.
