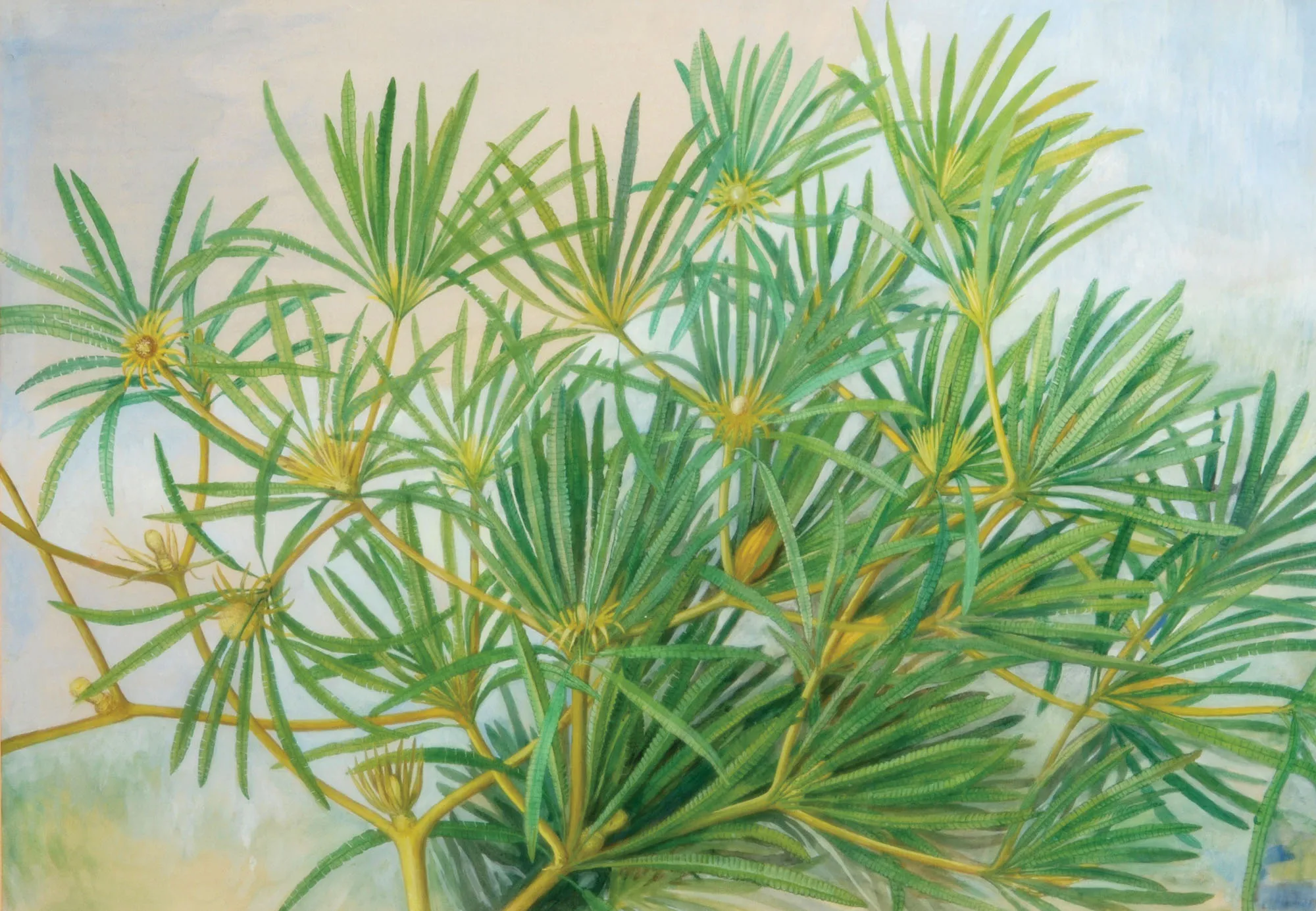
- Restoration of a member of Williamsoniaceae by Thérèse Ekblom
- Life restoration of Cycadeoidea (Cycadeoidaceae)

Scientific classification
- Kingdom: Plantae
- Clade: Embryophytes
- Clade: Tracheophytes
- Clade: Spermatophytes
- Order: †Bennettitales; Engler, 1892

Families
- Cycadeoidaceae; Williamsoniaceae

= Bennettitales =

Bennettitales Temporal range: Permian - Late Cretaceous, Kungurian –Maastrichtian Possible Oligocene record

Extinct order of seed plants

Bennettitales (also known as cycadeoids) is an extinct order of seed plants that first appeared in the Permian period and became extinct in most areas toward the end of the Cretaceous. Bennettitales were amongst the most common seed plants of the Mesozoic, and had morphologies including shrub and cycad-like forms. The foliage of bennettitaleans is superficially nearly indistinguishable from that of cycads, but they are distinguished from cycads by their more complex flower-like reproductive organs, at least some of which were likely pollinated by insects.

Although certainly gymnosperms sensu lato (cone-bearing seed plants), the relationships of bennettitaleans to other seed plants is debated. Their general resemblance to cycads is contradicted by numerous more subtle features of their reproductive systems and leaf structure. Some authors have linked bennettitaleans to angiosperms (flowering plants) and gnetophytes (a rare and unusual group of modern gymnosperms), forming a broader group known as Anthophyta. Molecular data contradicts this, with gnetophytes found to be much more genetically similar to conifers. The exact position of Bennettitales remains uncertain.

== Description ==
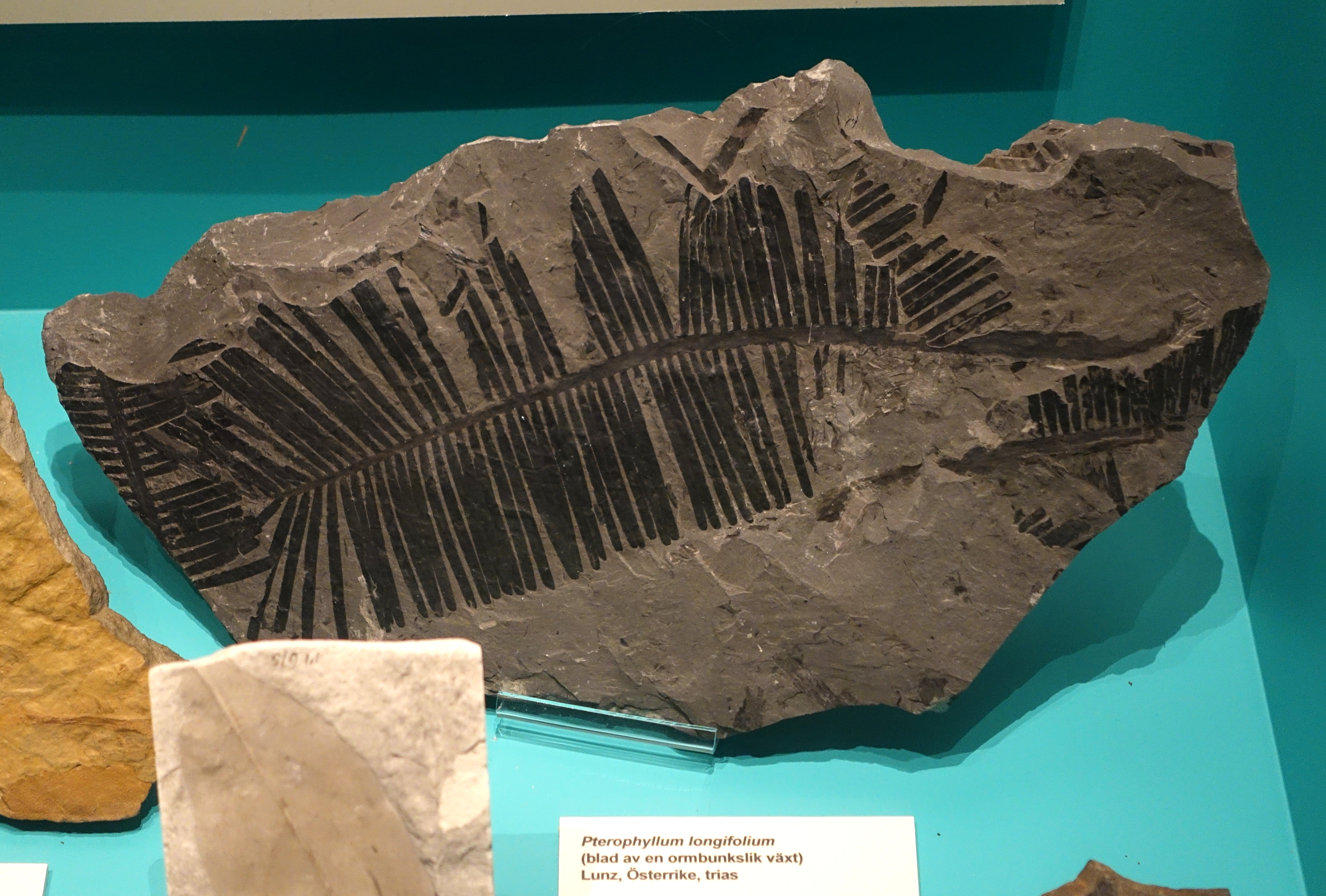
Bennettitales foliage assigned to the genus Pterophyllum

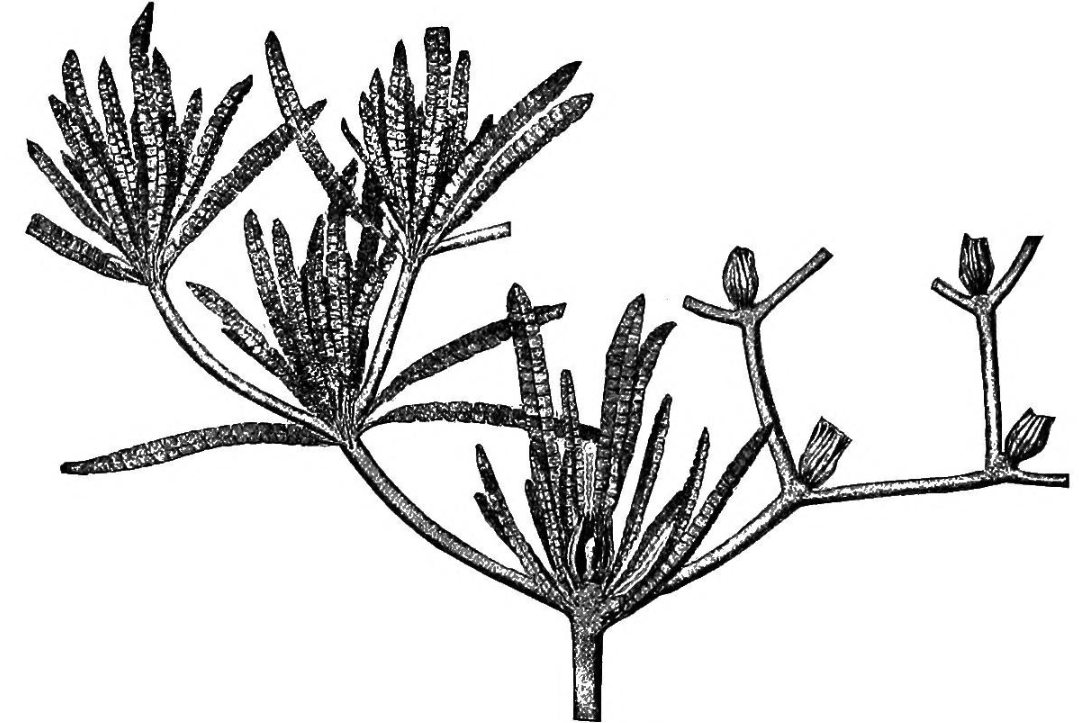
Restoration of the willamsoniacean shrub Wielandiella angustifolia showing divaricate branching habit

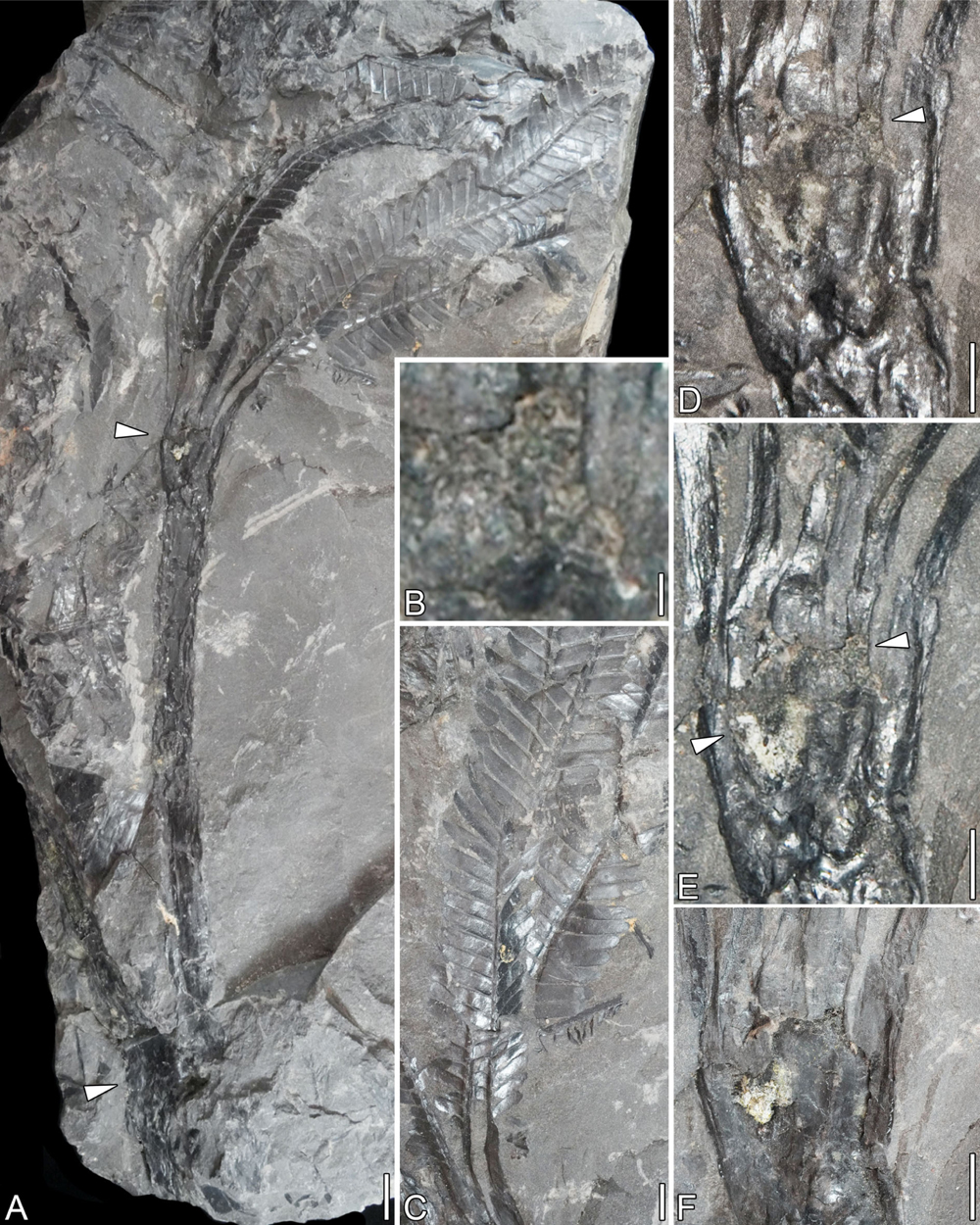
Fossil of Ohaniella, a williamsoniaceous bennettitalean known from a whole plant, showing Ptilophyllum-type leaves attached to a stem

Bennettitales are divided into two families, Cycadeoidaceae and Williamsoniaceae, which have distinct growth habits. Cycadeoidaceae had stout, cycad-like trunks with bisporangiate (containing both megaspores and microspores) strobili (cones) serving as their reproductive structures. Williamsoniaceae either had bisporangiate or monosporangiate cones, and distinctly slender and branching woody trunks. The Williamsoniaceae grew as woody shrubs with a divaricate branching habit, similar to that of Banksia. It has been suggested that Williamsoniaceae are a paraphyletic (not containing all descendants of a common ancestor) assemblage of all Bennettitales that do not belong to the Cycadeoidaceae.

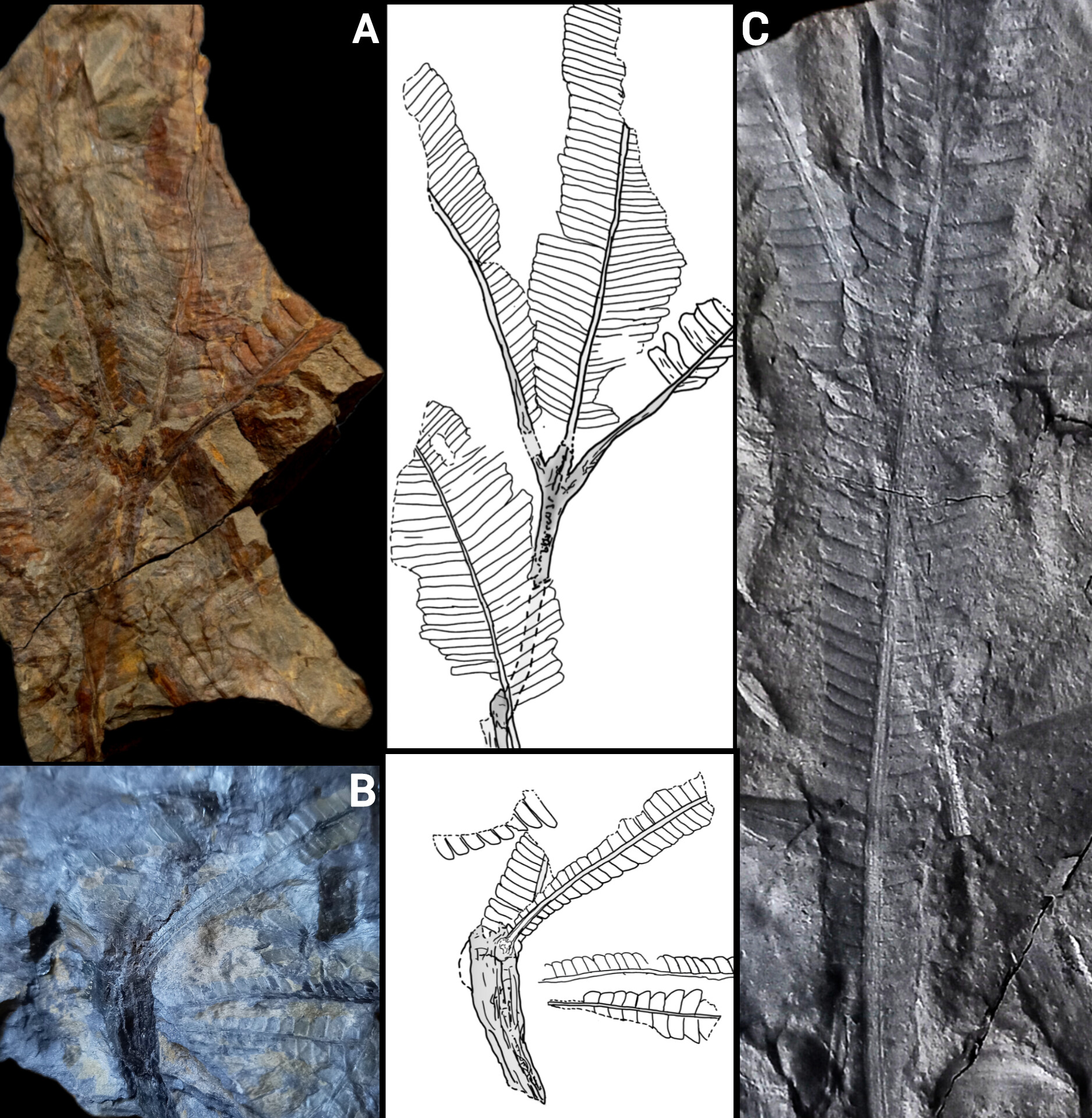
Fossils and schematic drawing of Pterophyllum bavieri from the Triassic of Iran

=== Foliage ===
In general, bennettitalean leaves are attached to the stem with a helical (corkscrew) arrangement. Some leaves (most species of Nilssoniopteris, etc.) are narrow, solitary blades with a smooth-edged ("entire") margin. Most leaf morphotypes (Pterophyllum, Ptilophyllum, Zamites, Otozamites, etc.) are pinnate (feather-shaped), with many small leaf segments attached to a central shaft. Others (Anomozamites, a few species of Nilssoniopteris) are incompletely pinnate (sawtooth-shaped) and transitional between these two end members. One unusual leaf form, Eoginkgoites, even approaches a palmate appearance similar to early species of Ginkgo.

The foliage of bennettitaleans resembles that of cycads to such an extent that the foliage of the two groups cannot be reliably distinguished based on gross morphology alone. However, fossil foliage which preserves the cuticle can be assigned to either group with confidence. The stomata of bennettitaleans are described as syndetocheilic. This means that the main paired guard cells develop from the same mother cells as the subsidiary cells which surround them. This contrasts with the haplocheilic stomata of cycads and conifers. In haplocheilic stomata, the ring of subsidiary cells are not derived from the same original structures as the guard cells. This fundamental difference is the main way to differentiate bennettitalean and cycad foliage.

=== Cones and seeds ===
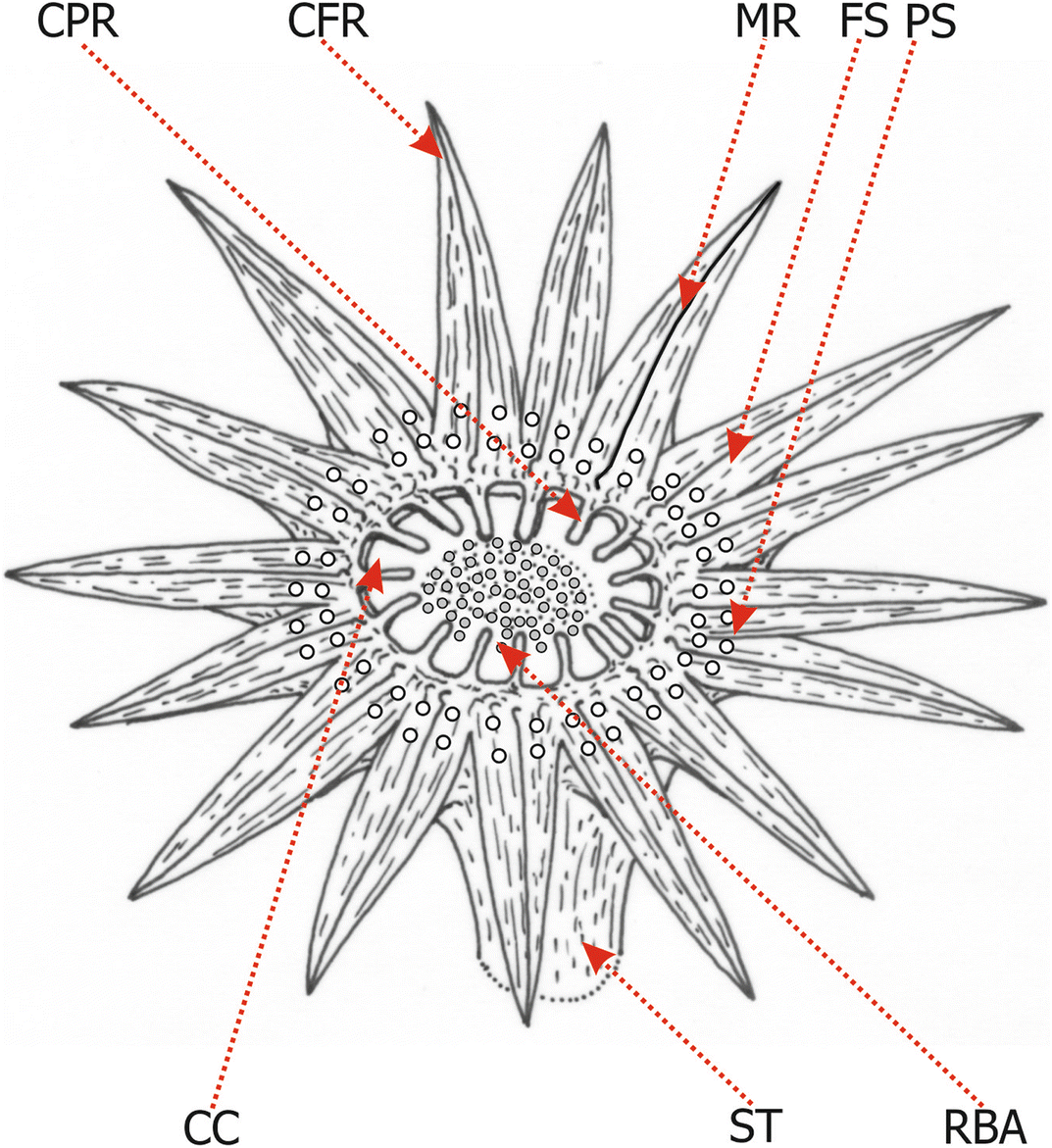
Diagram of male Williamsoniaceae reproductive structure Weltrichia. Labels: CFR Centrifugal ray; CPR Centripetal ray; MR Median ridge; FS Fibrous strand; PS Pollen sac position (in this case, pollen sac attachment); CC Central cup; RBA Resin (resinous) body or attractant; ST Stalk

Cross section of the female williamsoniaceous seed cone Williamsonia harrisiana

Like other gymnosperms, bennettitalean reproductive inflorescences come in the form of cones, which produce pollen and ovules (unfertilized seeds). The cones have a thick central receptacle surrounded by simple, helically-arranged fertile and infertile structures. Tissue at the base of the cone forms layers of scale-like or petal-like bracts to protect the radiating inner structures. Some authors refer to bennettitalean cones as "flowers", though they are not equivalent to true angiosperm flowers. Pollen is often enclosed in paired synangia (pollen sacs). The synangia lie on the adaxial (inner) edge of pollen-bearing leaf-like structures known as microsporophylls. This contrasts with cycads, all of which lack discrete synangia and bear pollen on the abaxial (outer) surface of their microsporophylls.

Many bennettitaleans are bisporangiate, where the pollen and ovules are hosted on the same (bisexual or hermaphrodite) cone. Cavities filled with curved synangia-bearing microsporophylls are encased by thin radiating structures, including thick, infertile interseminal scales and fertile sporophylls with ovules at their tips. The presence of ovules at the tips of sporophylls, rather than the tips of stems, is a major difference between the cones of bennettitaleans and gnetophytes. As the cone is fertilized and matures, the microsporophylls wither away and the ovules transform into seeds.

Most bennettitaleans in the family Williamsoniaceae are instead monosporangiate, with separate pollen and ovule-producing (unisexual) cones on the same plant. The ovule-producing (female) cones (Williamsonia, etc.) are similar to mature bisporangiate cones, with interseminal scales and ovule-tipped sporophylls enclosed by bracts. Pollen-producing (male) cones (Weltrichia, etc.), on the other hand, feature an exposed crown of tapering microsporophylls with adaxial rows of synangia. The microsporophylls may host a single linear row of paired synangia, or instead synangia arranged in a pinnate (feather-shaped) pattern.

Seeds are dicotyledonous (possess two embryonic leaves), with a central embryo surrounded by three layers: the thin megagametophyte, the slightly thicker nucellus, and the protective integument. The upper tip of the seed is tapered and opens through a thin and often extended micropyle. A long, narrow micropyle extending out of the seed is superficially similar to the condition in living gnetophytes. Once the seed is fertilized, the micropyle is sealed by a plug-shaped extension of the nucellus. Unlike living gymnosperms, the tip of the nucellus lacks a pollen chamber (receptacle for stored pollen). The integument is dense and thick, with many layers of differentiated cells. This contrasts with the thin, biseriate (two cell-layer) integument of gnetophytes. Bennettitaleans also lack another gnetophyte-like trait: a sheath of fused bracteoles enveloping the seed. Most integument cells are not unusual in size or shape. However, near the micropyle the innermost layer of integument cells become radially-oriented and elongated, partially closing in on the micropyle. The nucellus and integument are unfused above the chalaza (base of the seed), unlike cycads or gnetophytes, where the layers are fused for much of their height.

Cycadeoidaceans have been suggested to have been self-pollinating, with their stems and cones buried underground, although it has alternatively been proposed that they were pollinated by beetles. The flower-like williamsoniacean male reproductive structure Weltrichia is associated with the female reproductive structure Williamsonia, though it is uncertain whether the parent plants were monoecious (male and female reproductive structures being present on the same plant) or dioecious (where each plant has only one gender of reproductive organ). Weltrichia was likely primarily wind-pollinated, with some species possibly pollinated by beetles.

Several groups of Jurassic and Early Cretaceous insects possessed a long proboscis, and it has been suggested that they fed on nectar produced by bennettitalean reproductive structures, such as the bisexual williamsoniacean reproductive structure Williamsoniella, which had a long, narrow central receptacle which was likely otherwise inaccessible. Early Cretaceous bennettitalean pollen has been found directly associated with a proboscis bearing fly belonging to the extinct family Zhangsolvidae, providing evidence that this family acted as pollinators for the group. The interseminal scales of Bennettitales ovulate cones may have become fleshy at maturity, which could have potentially made then attractive to wild animals that served as seed dispersers.

== Taxonomy ==
=== History of discovery ===
The Cycadeoideaceae (originally "Cycadeoideae") were named by English geologist William Buckland in 1828, from fossil trunks found in Jurassic strata on the Isle of Portland, England, which Buckland gave the genus name Cycadeoidea. Buckland provided a description of the family and two species, but failed to give a description of the genus, which has led to Buckland's description of the family being considered invalid by modern taxonomic standards. In publications in 1870, Scottish botanist William Carruthers and English paleobotanist William Crawford Williamson described the first known reproductive organs of the Bennettitales from Jurassic strata of Yorkshire and Jurassic-Cretaceous strata of the Isle of Wight and the Isle of Portland. Caruthers was the first to recognise that Bennettitales had distinct differences from cycads, and established the tribes "Williamsonieae" and "Bennettiteae", with the latter being named after the genus Bennettites named by Caruthers in the same publication, the name being in honour of British botanist John Joseph Bennett. The order Bennettitales was erected by German botanist Adolf Engler in 1892, who recognised the group as separate from the Cycadales.

=== Relationships to other seed plants ===
The Anthophyte hypothesis erected by Arber and Parkin in 1907 posited that angiosperms arose from Bennettitales, as suggested by the wood-like structures and rudimentary flowers. Based on morphological data, however, Bennettitales were classified as a monophyletic group when paired with Gnetales. A study in 2006 suggested that Bennettitales, Angiosperms, and Gigantopteridales form a clade based on the presence of oleanane. Molecular evidence has consistently contradicted the Anthophyte hypothesis, finding that Angiosperms are the sister group to all living gymnosperms, including Gnetales. Some authors have suggested, due to similarities between their seed coats, Bennettitales form a clade with the gymnosperm orders of Gnetales and Erdtmanithecales, dubbed the "BEG group". However, this proposal has been contested by other authors, who contend that these similarities are only superficial and do not indicate a close relationship. A 2017 phylogeny based on molecular signatures of fossilised cuticles found that Bennettitales were more closely related to the Ginkgo+Cycads clade than conifers, and were closely related to Nilssonia and Ptilozamites.

== Evolutionary history ==
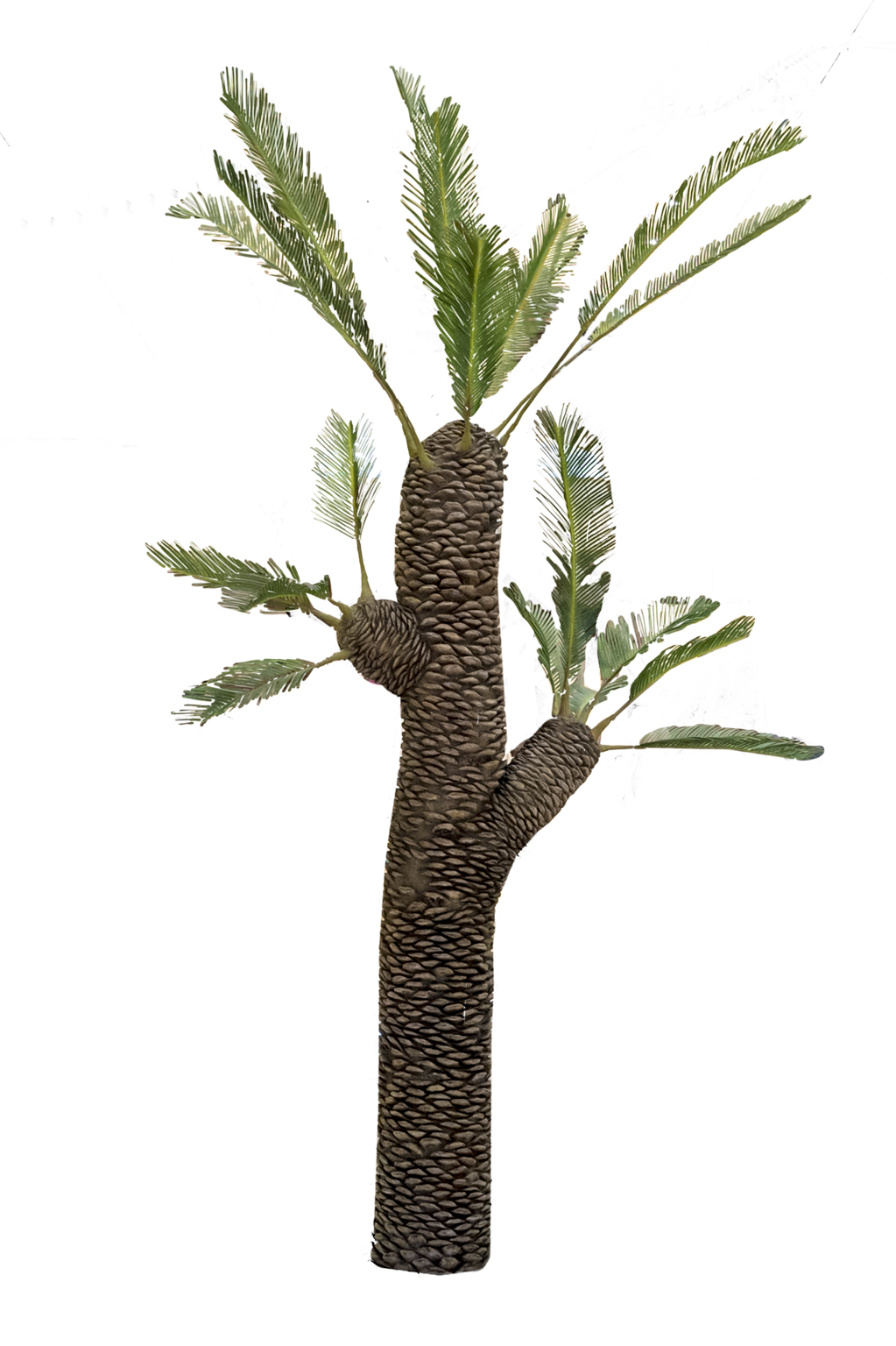
Life restoration of "Williamsonia" sewardiana from the Early Cretaceous of India, which may represent a primitive member of Cycadeoidaceae

The oldest confirmed fossils of bennettitaleans are leaves of Nilssoniopteris shanxiensis, a species from the upper part of the Upper Shihhotse Formation in Shanxi Province, China. This strata is dated to the early Kungurian stage of the early Permian (Cisuralian), around 281 million years ago. Supposed Carboniferous-Permian records of Pterophyllum do not have conclusive bennettitalean affinities or have been reinterpreted as cycad foliage in the form genus Pseudoctenis. True Permian records of benettitalean leaves are rare; outside of the Shihhotse Formation they are only found in the Late Permian (likely Changhsingian)-age Umm Irna Formation in Jordan. This formation is notable for the early occurrence of other Mesozoic-style flora, including the earliest records of corystospermalean foliage (Dicroidium). The order Fredlindiales (containing the genus Fredlindia) from the Late Triassic of Gondwana appears to be closely related to Bennettitales, but differs from it in some aspects of its reproductive organs.

The oldest bennettitalean reproductive structures are Williamsonia "flowers" from the Early Triassic of Australia. Williamsoniaceans became globally distributed by the end of the Triassic. TheWhile Williamsoniaceae had a global distribution, Cycadeoidaceae appear to have been primarily confined to the western parts of Laurasia, and are primarily known from the Cretaceous. Bennettitales were widespread and abundant during the Jurassic and Early Cretaceous, however Bennettitales severely declined during the Late Cretaceous, coincident with the rise of flowering plants, being mostly extinct by the end of the period, with the final known remains from the Northern Hemisphere being found in the polar latitude Kakanaut Formation in Chukotka, Russia, dating to the Maastrichtian, assignable to Pterophyllum. A possible late record has been reported from the early Oligocene of eastern Australia and Tasmania, assignable to the genus Ptilophyllum, but no cuticle was preserved, making the referral inconclusive.

== Subgroups ==
- Cycadolepis (scales or bracts, unplaced in family)
- Haitingeria? (pollen organ?)
- Lunzia (pollen organ, unplaced in family)
- Leguminanthus? (pollen organ?)
- Leuthardtia? (pollen organ?)
- Westersheimia (ovulate organ, unplaced in family)
- Anthrophyopsis? (leaf)
- Family Cycadeoidaceae
  - Cycadeoidea
  - Monanthesia
- Family Williamsoniaceae
  - Anomozamites (leaf)
  - Bennetticarpus (female seed cone)
  - Bennettistemon (male pollen organ)
  - Bucklandia (axes)
  - Eoginkgoites (leaf)
  - Ischnophyton
  - Kimuriella (whole plant)
  - Nilssoniopteris (leaf)
  - Ohaniella
  - Otozamites (leaf)
  - Pterophyllum (leaf)
  - Ptilophyllum (leaf)
  - Vardekloeftia (female seed cone)
  - Weltrichia (male pollen organ)
  - Wielandiella (whole plant)
  - Williamsonia (female seed cones)
  - Williamsoniella (bisexual reproductive structure)
  - Zamites (leaf, in partim)
  - Haitingeria (pollen organ)

Bennettitales is typically considered the sole order in the class Bennettitopsida Engler (1897) or Cycadeoideopsida Scott (1923). Most paleobotanists prefer the two families as used here, though some authors, such as Anderson & Anderson (2007), classify the order via a larger number of families. Anderson & Anderson also classified the orders Fredlindiales Anderson & Anderson (2003) and Pentoxylales Pilger & Melchior (1954) within Bennettitopsida.

== Gallery ==
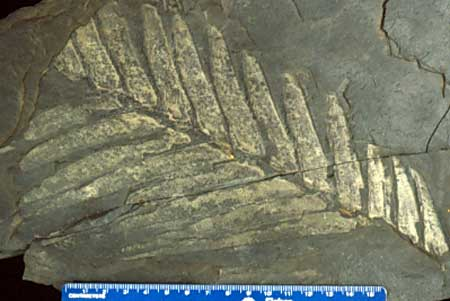
Fossil leaf of Zamites mariposana from the Jurassic.

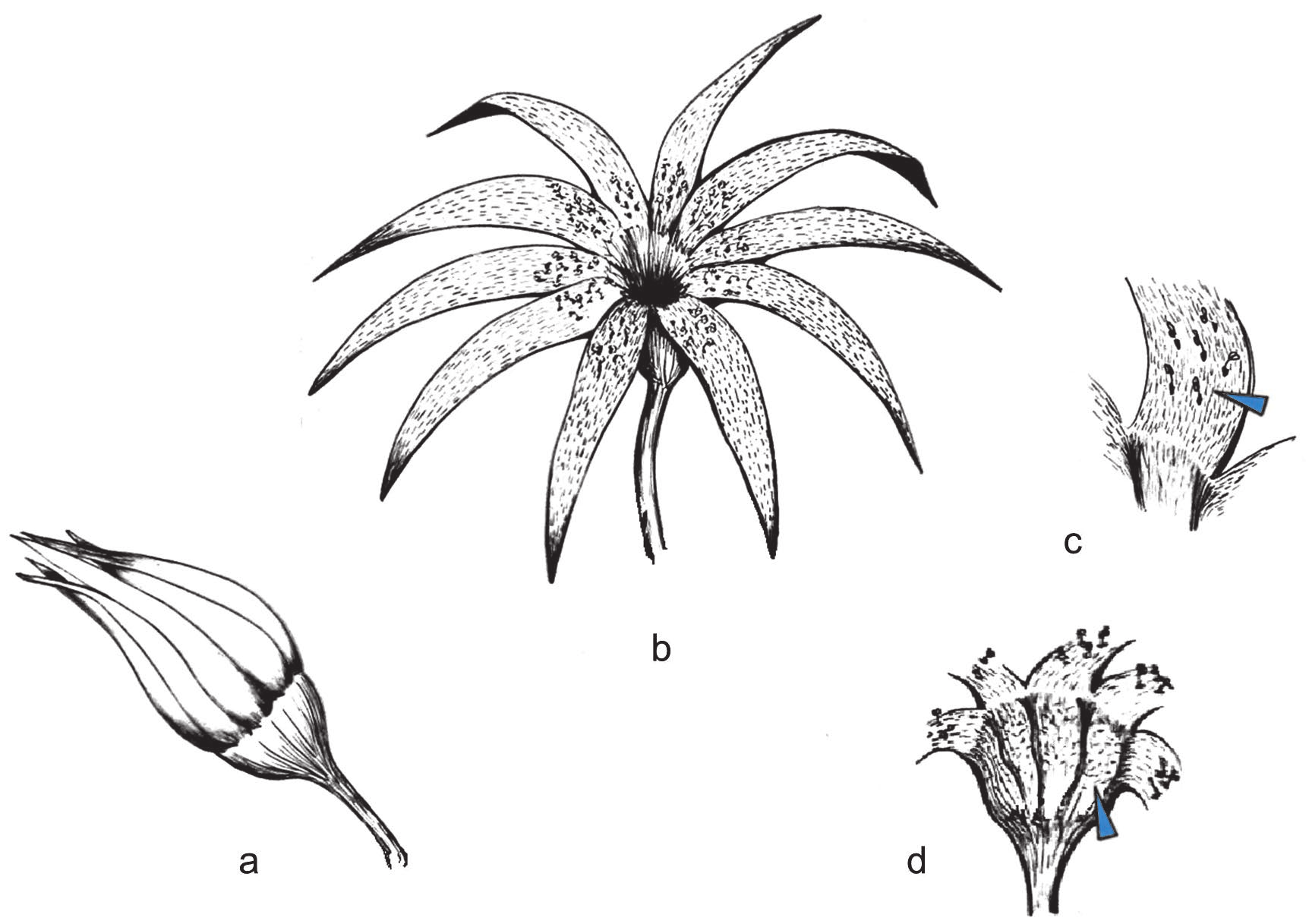
Restoration of Weltrichia magna from the Jurassic of Mexico

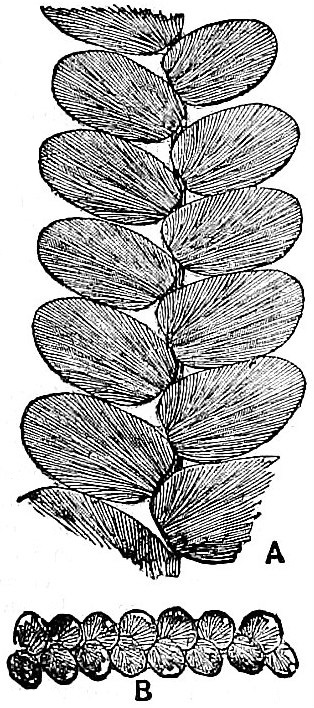
Otozamites leaf

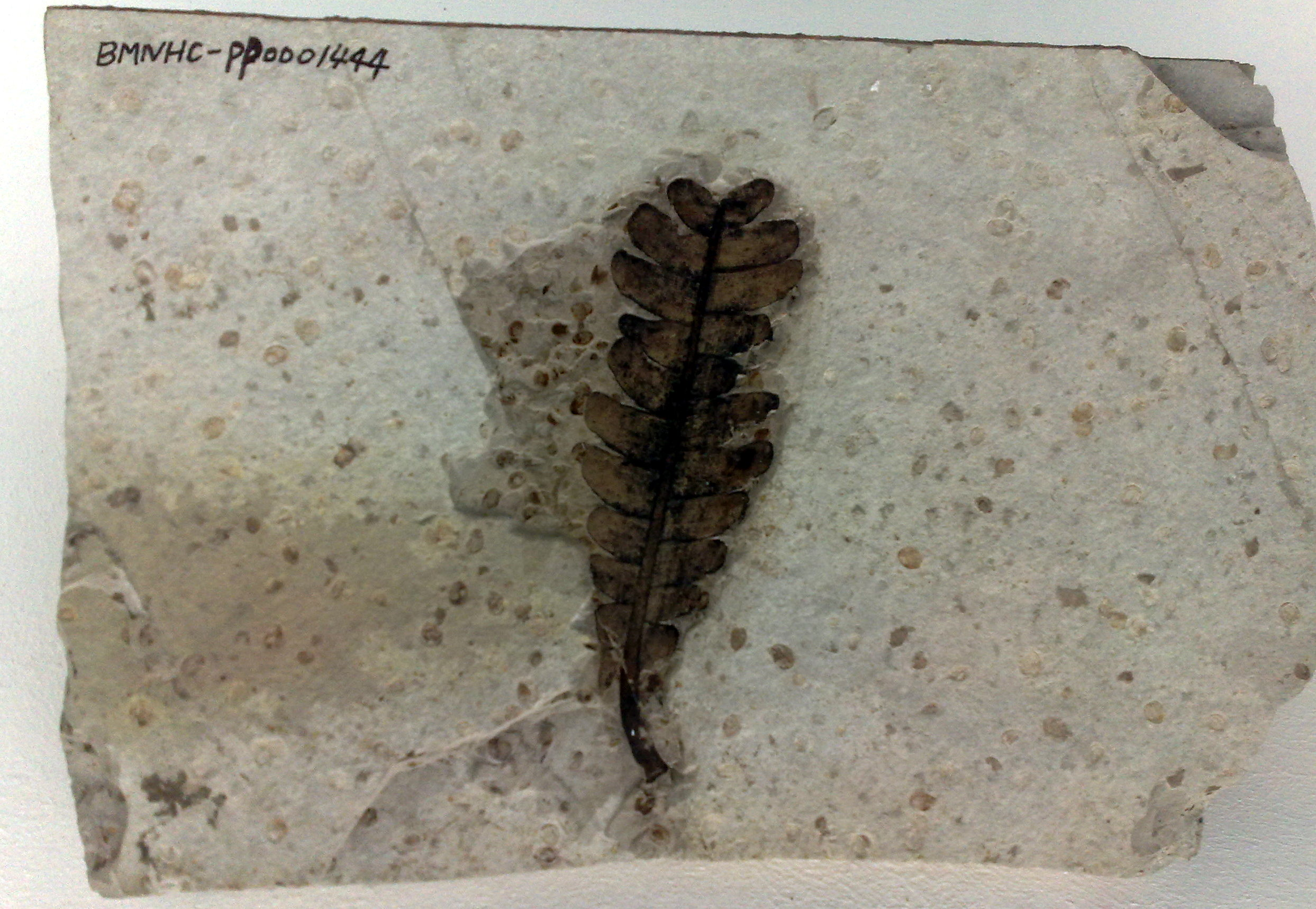
Leaf of Anomozamites

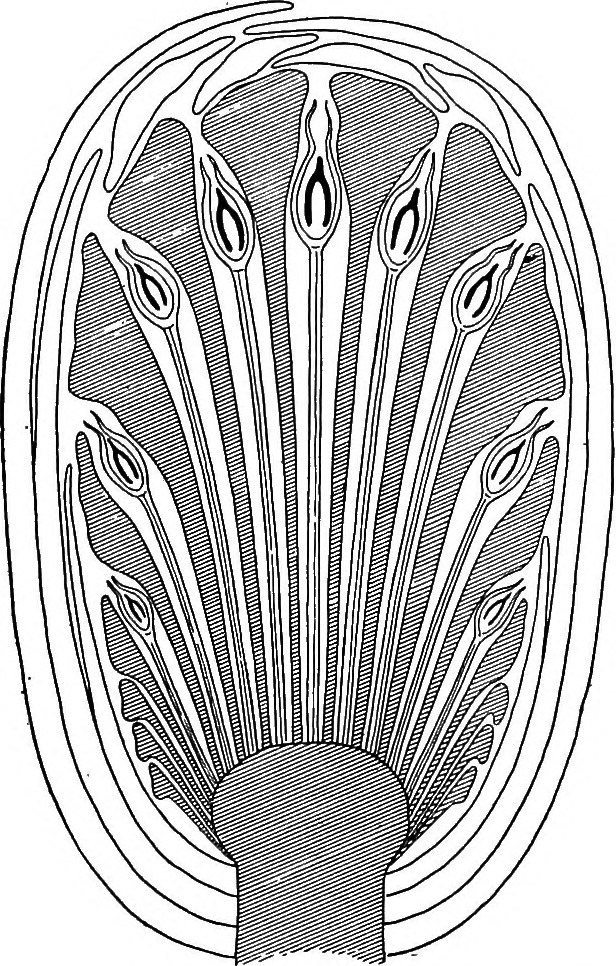
Seed bearing strobilus of Bennettites

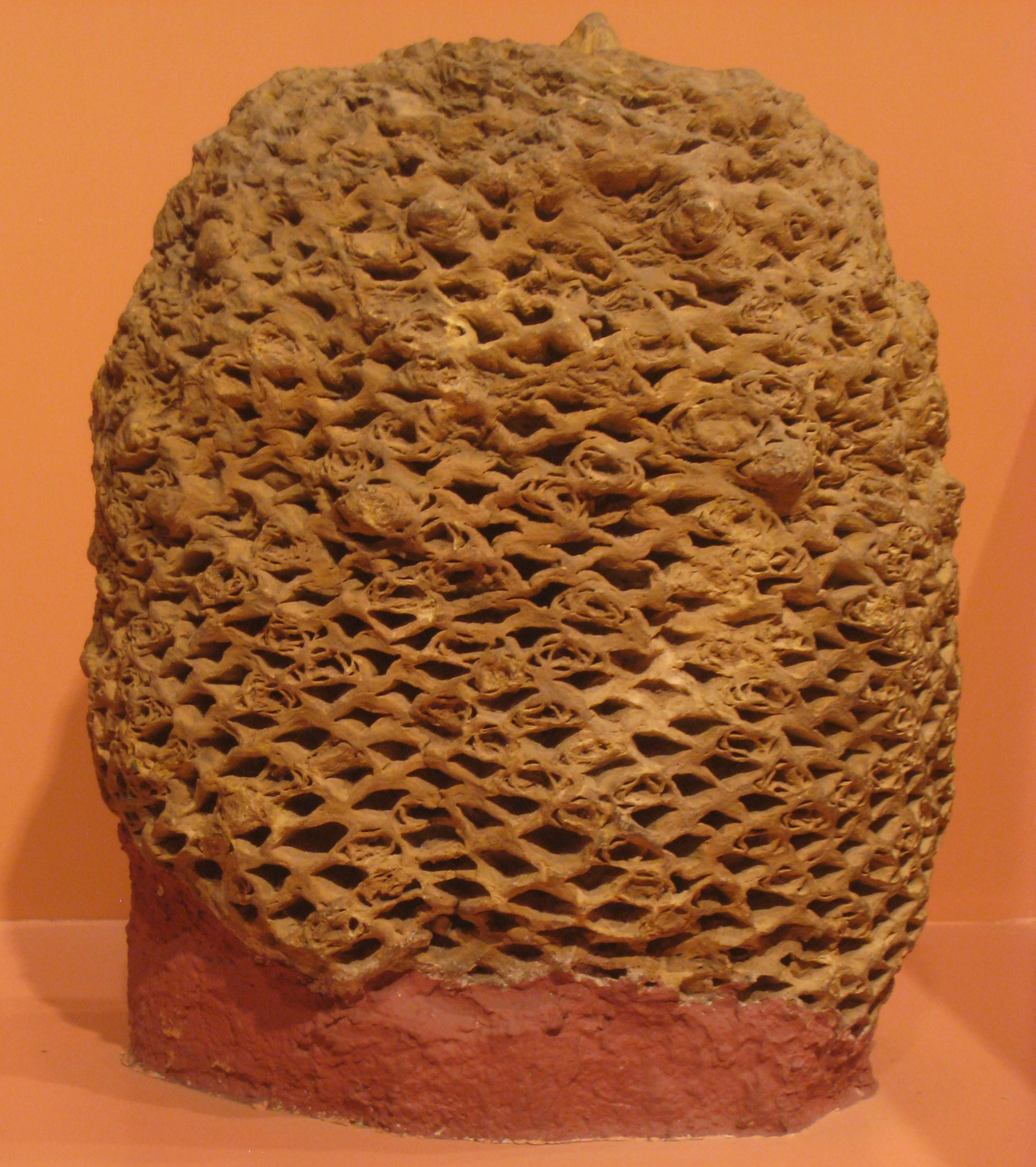
Trunk of Cycadeoidea

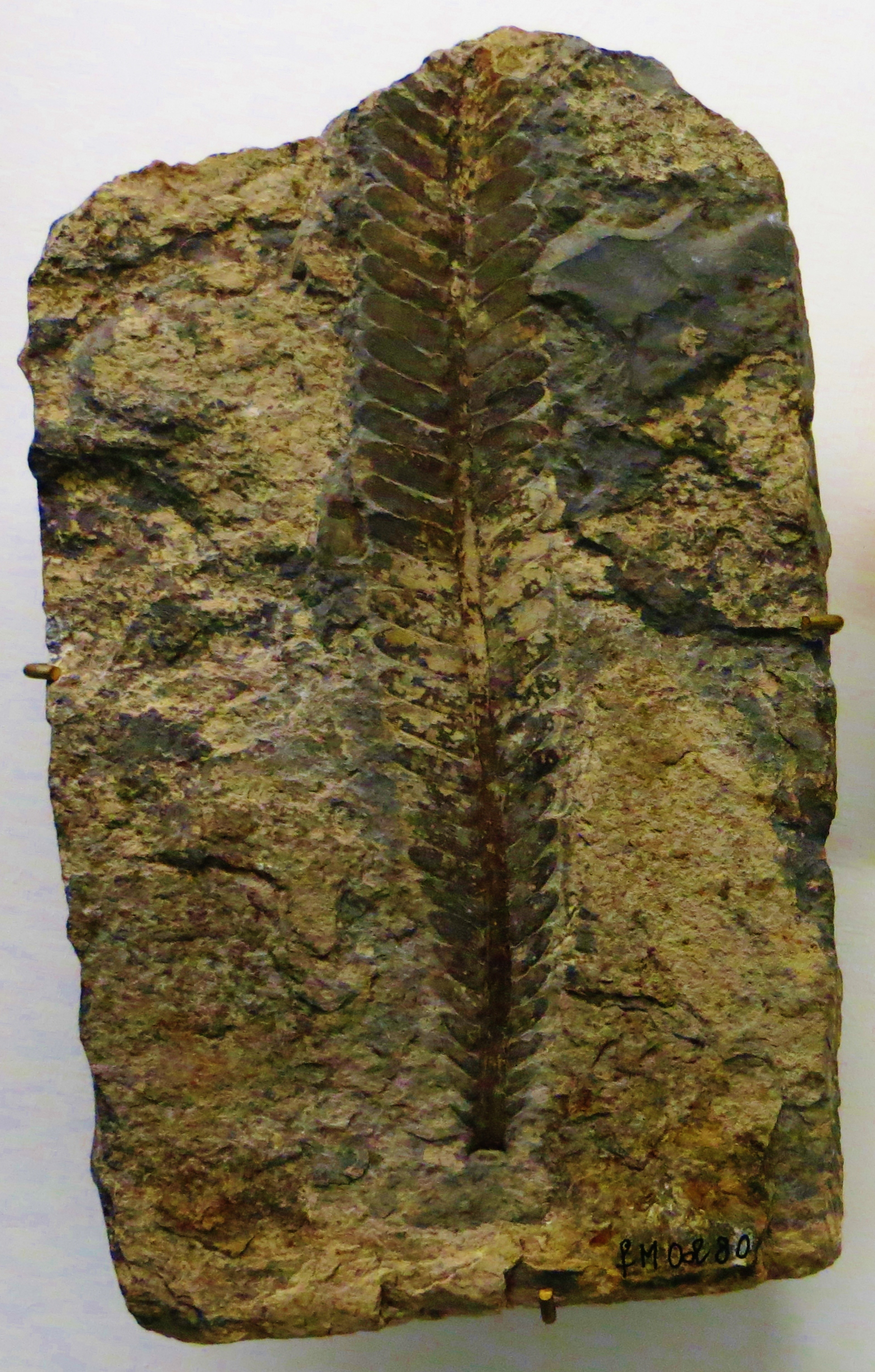
Fossil of Ptilophyllum grandifolium
