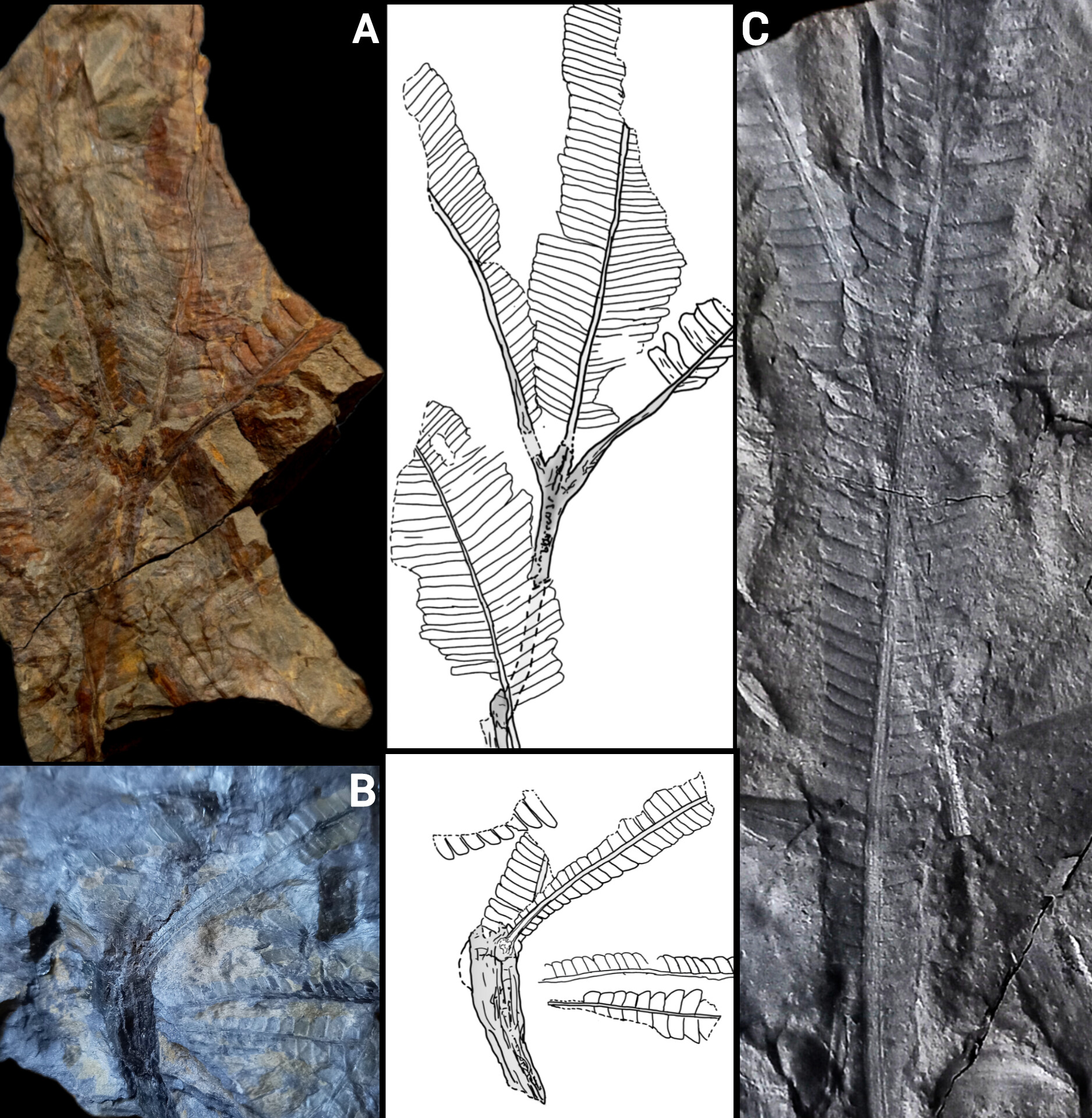
- Fossils and schematic diagram of Pterophyllum bavieri from the Late Triassic (Rhaetian) of northern Iran, Shemshak Group, A and B: leaves attached to a branch C: complete leaf

Scientific classification
- Kingdom: Plantae
- Clade: Tracheophytes
- Order: †Bennettitales
- Family: †Williamsoniaceae
- Genus: †Pterophyllum; Brongniart 1825

Type species
- †Pterophyllum filicoides (Schlotheim) René Zeiller, 1906

Synonyms
- Ctenophyllum Schimper 1870; Osmundites Jaeger 1827

= Pterophyllum (plant) =

Pterophyllum Temporal range: Carnian–Maastrichtian

Extinct genus of seed plants

Pterophyllum is an extinct form genus of leaves known from the Carnian to the Maastrichtian, belonging to the Bennettitales (family Williamsoniaceae). It contains more than 50 species, and is mainly found in Eurasia and North America.

== Description ==
Pterophyllum are characterized by their completely segmented leaves, with slender leaflets more than twice as long as they are high. The leaflets are regularly spaced, arranged opposite to each other, and have nearly parallel edges, only slightly broader at their bases and narrower at their tips. They are covered with fine longitudinal veins with minor bifurcation. The leaflets slightly lengthen towards the middle of the leaf and shrink towards its tip, for an overall lanceolate (long and tapered) or oblong shape to the leaf. At the tip of the leaf sits a terminal leaflet which can vary in shape from the rest. Like other bennettitaleans, the leaf's cuticle was syndetocheilic (with guard and subsidiary cells of the stomata having the same mother cells) and hypostomatic (with stomata located entirely underneath the leaf).

In the Mesozoic Era, the Pterophyllum thrived and could be found in great abundance together with the rest of the Bennettitales order. Pterophyllum probably grew as a shrub, like other Williamsoniaceae.

== Taxonomy ==
Pterophyllum filicoides, a species named by Schlotheim in 1822, was established as the type species of Pterophyllum by Zeiller in 1906. The name Pterophyllum was first introduced in 1825 by Brongniart, who described two species from the Upper Triassic found in Sweden. These species were P. minus and P. majus. At this time, what now is the type species was thought to be an alga, but later Brongniart expanded his diagnosis to include more species, including the type species. Later, the two originally described species were moved to the genus Anomozamites, resulting in the illegitimatization of the name. Since Pterophyllum as a name had been widely used, the new type species P. filicoides was assigned to the name to retain legitimacy. Species of Pterophyllum are generally separated by the shape of their leaves as well as other features on the leaves such as vein density, anatomy of the stomata and epidermal cell shape.

=== Difficulties in classification ===
Pterophyllum can at times be very similar to Anomozamites, and the need to review the diagnostics of these genera has been raised, since the two genera have no distinct characteristics from one another in regards to their cuticles or epidermal cells. This means that the morphology of their leaves are the only method to differentiate between the two: the fossil is classified as a Pterophyllum if the leaf has a length which is at least twice its width, and as an Anomozamite if it does not. This can be difficult at times, and there are several examples where plants have been erroneously placed in one genus, before being correctly placed in the other. The similar form genus Ctenophyllum from the Late Triassic of Germany (as well as misattributed North American leaves) is likely a junior synonym of Pterophyllum.

== Significance ==
Pterophyllum can be used as a proxy to reconstruct past climates using the stomatal method to estimate CO_{2} concentrations. Due to the similarities between Pterophyllum and Anomozamites, these can be used interchangeably to increase the amount of data. Considering the abundance of these plants during the Mesozoic era, this can be of great value for scientists reconstructing the Mesozoic climate.

== Gallery ==
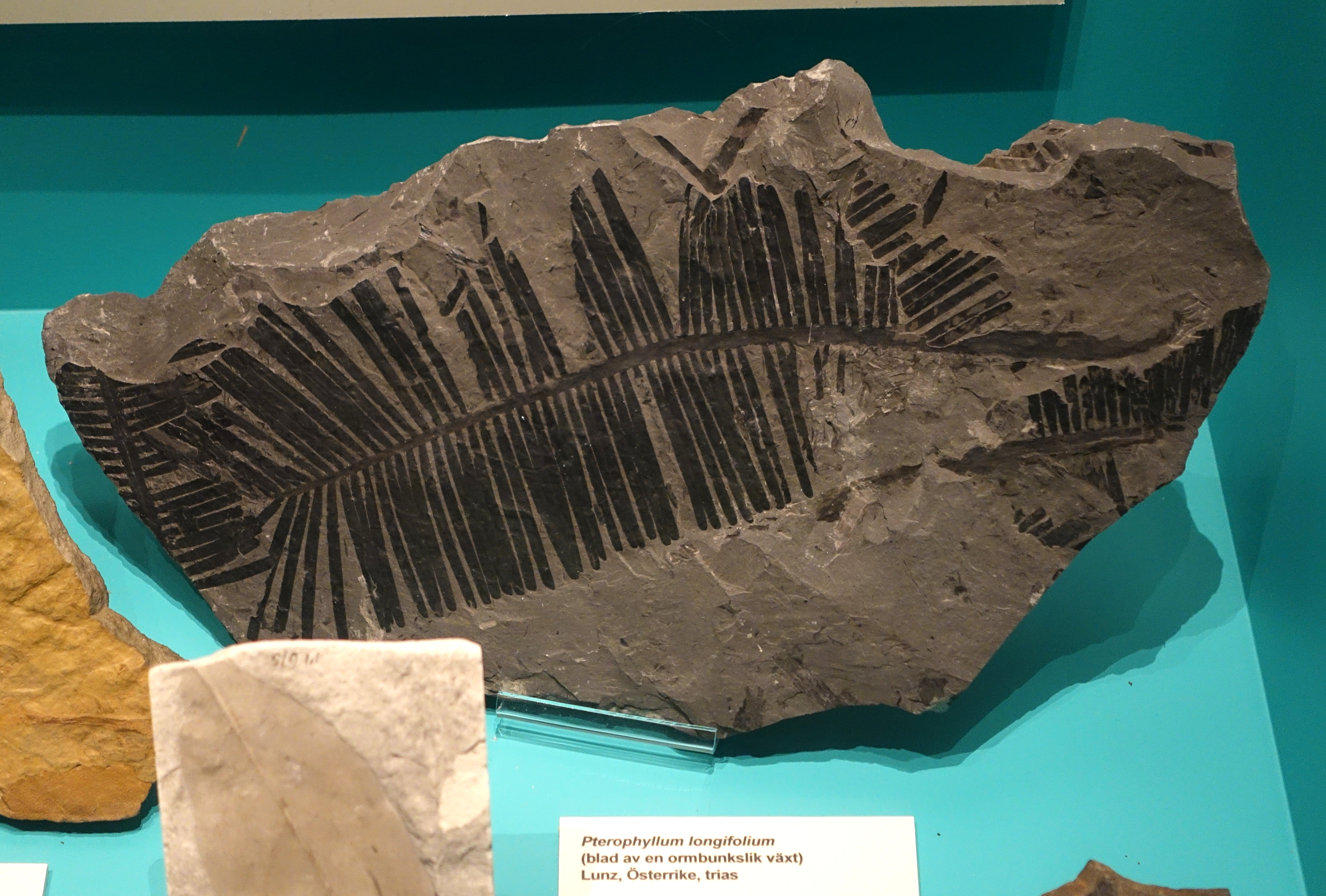
Pterophyllum longifolium

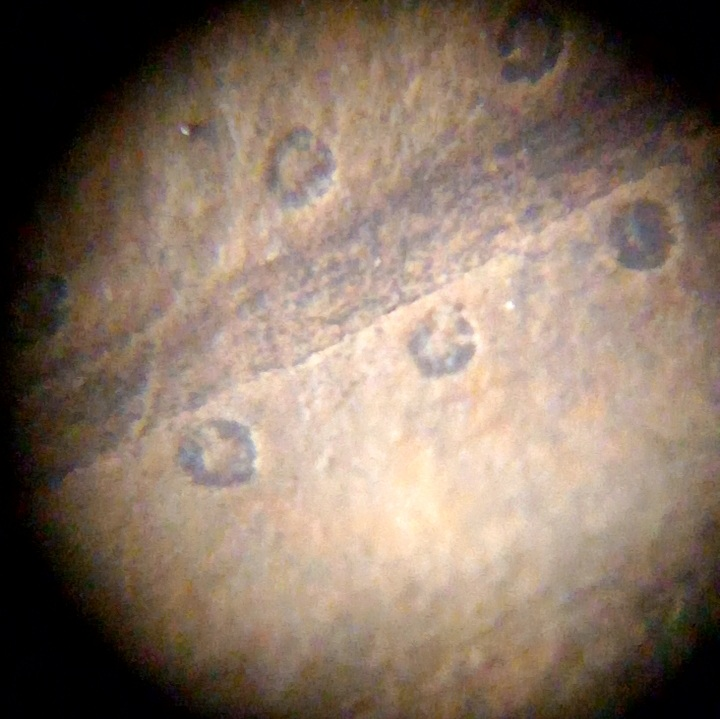
Fossil spores of Pterophyllum fern from Late Triassic, Alborz, Iran

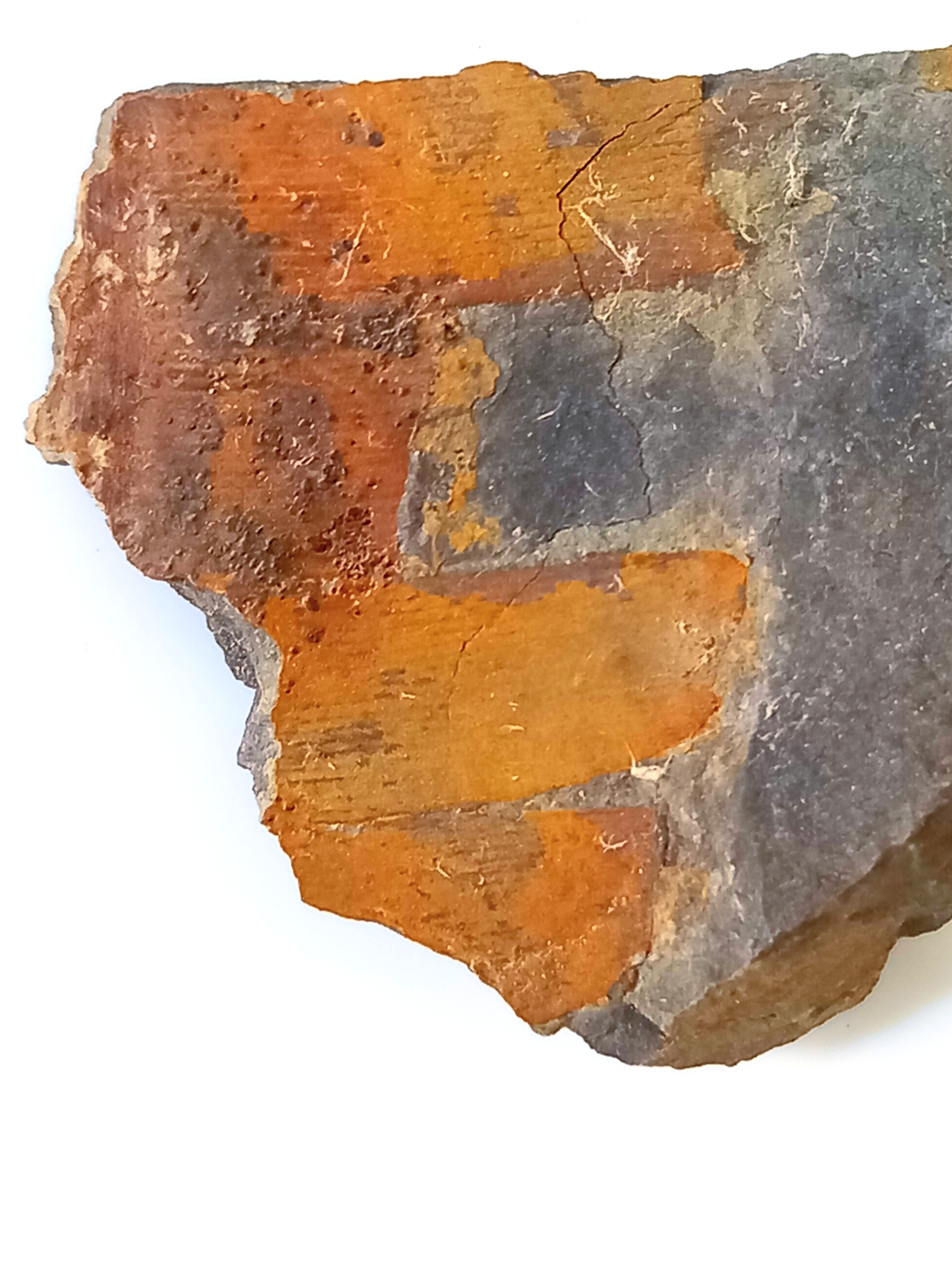
Fossil fern with galls, from Late Triassic, Alborz, Iran
