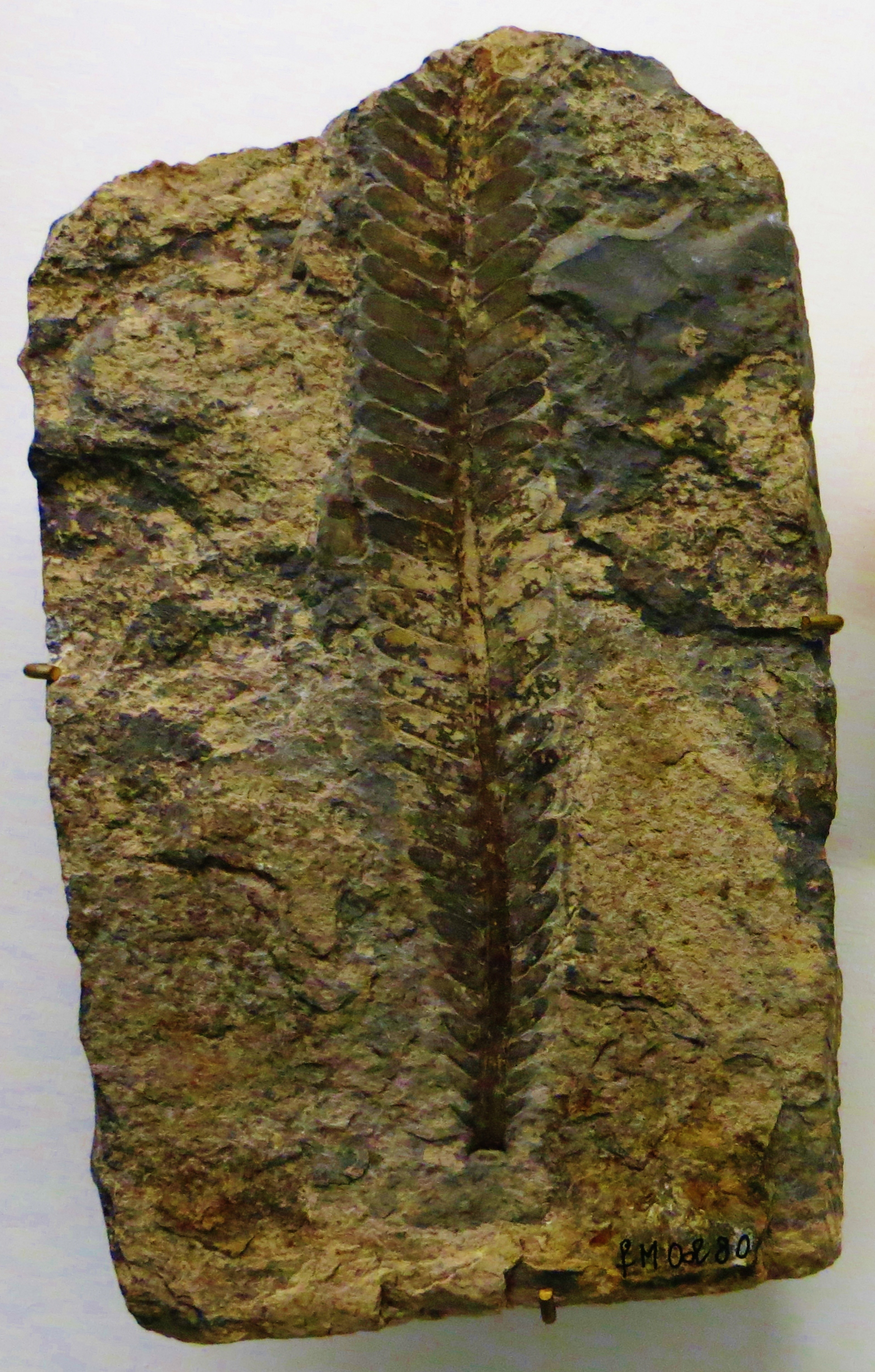
- Fossil of Ptilophyllum grandifolium

Scientific classification
- Kingdom: Plantae
- Clade: Tracheophytes
- Order: †Bennettitales
- Family: †Williamsoniaceae
- Genus: †Ptilophyllum

Type species
- †Ptilophyllum acutifolium Morris, 1840

= Ptilophyllum =

Ptilophyllum Temporal range: Norian–Cenomanian Possible Oligocene record

Extinct genus of seed plants

Ptilophyllum is an extinct form genus of leaves belonging to the extinct seed plant order Bennettitales. The leaves, like other Bennettitales morphogenera are generally pinnate. Leaves possibly attributable to the genus are known from the Oligocene of Australia, which may be the last known representatives of the order.
