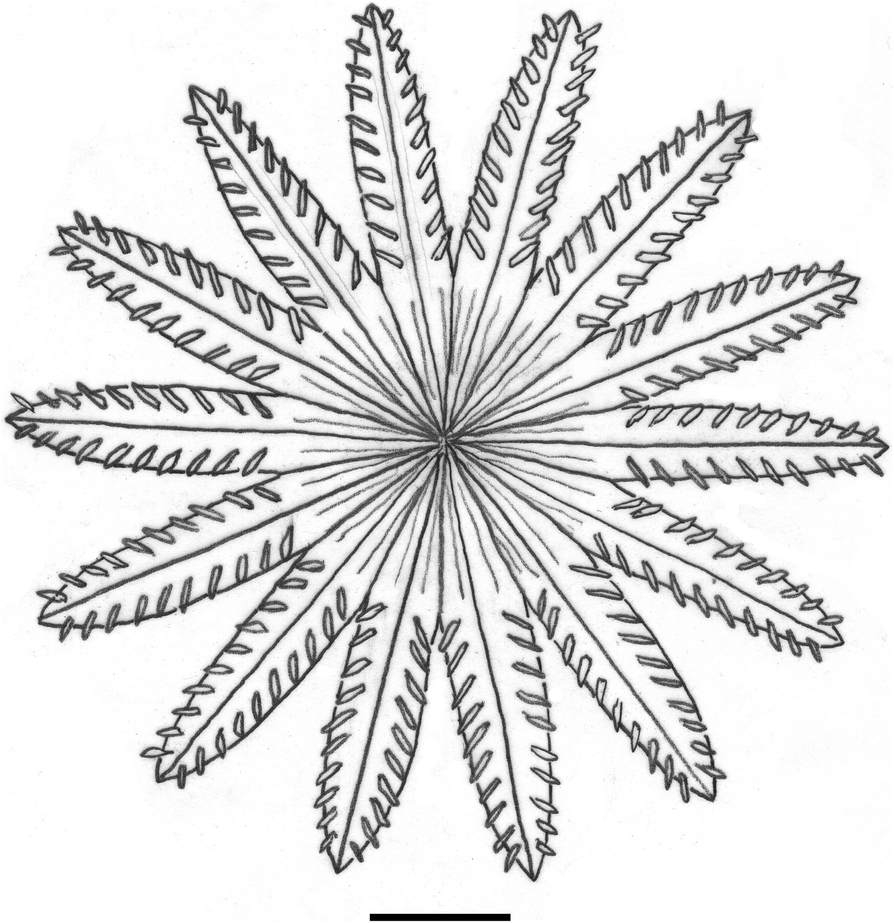
- Drawing of Weltrichia mirabilis

Scientific classification
- Kingdom: Plantae
- Clade: Tracheophytes
- Order: †Bennettitales
- Family: †Williamsoniaceae
- Genus: †Weltrichia; Braun

Type species
- Weltrichia mirabilis Braun

Species
- See text

= Weltrichia =

Weltrichia Temporal range: Late Triassic–Late Jurassic

Extinct genus of bennettitalean plant

Weltrichia is a genus belonging to the extinct seed plant group Bennettitales. It is a form genus representing flower-like male pollen-producing organs. It is associated with the female ovulate cone Williamsonia.

== Description ==
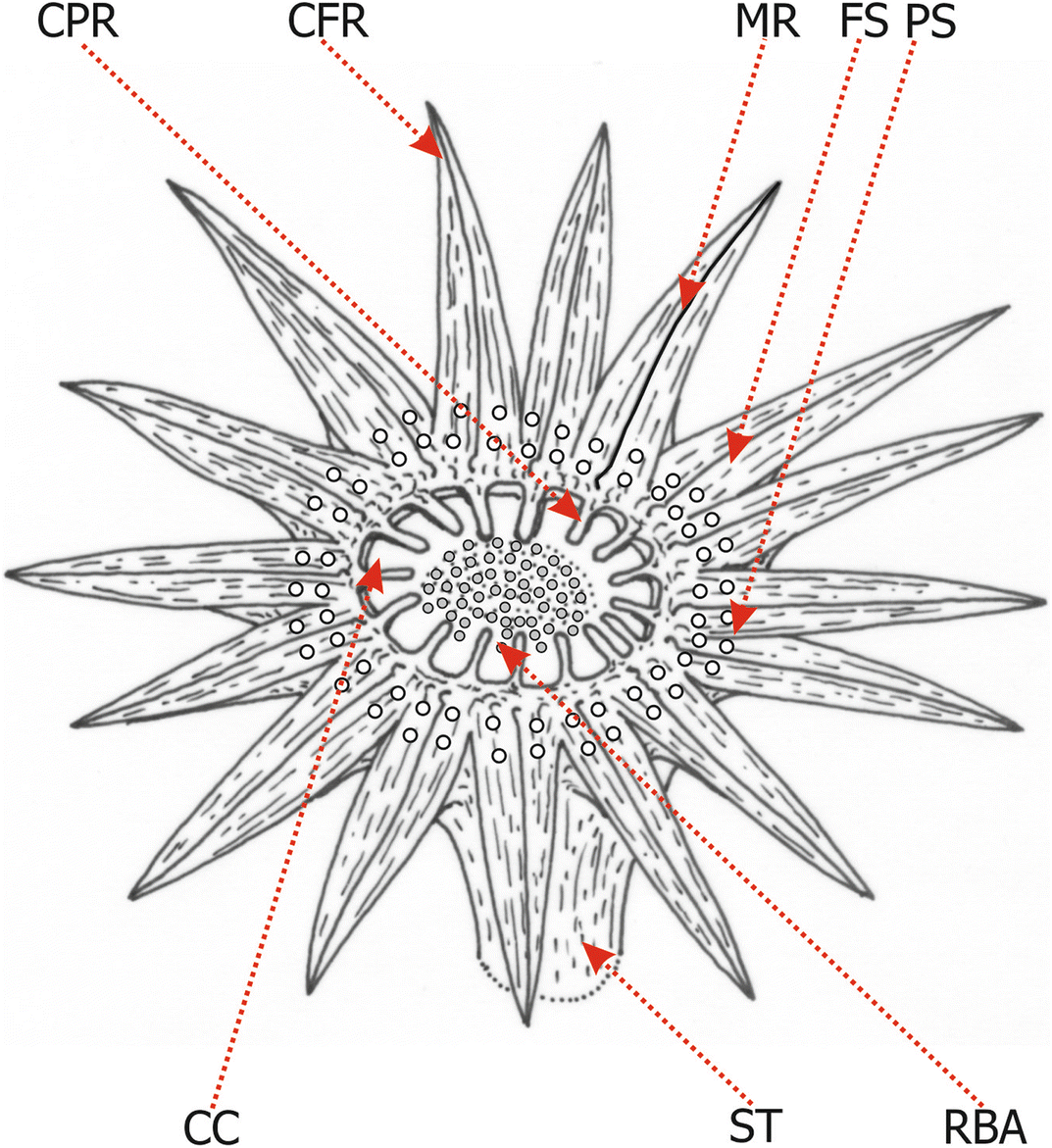
Diagram of Weltrichia givulescui. Labels: CFR Centrifugal ray; CPR Centripetal ray; MR Median ridge; FS Fibrous strand; PS Pollen sac position (in this case, pollen sac attachment); CC Central cup; RBA Resin (resinous) body or attractant; ST Stalk

Although the morphology of Weltrichia is highly variable, the overall morphology consists of a central cup-like structure surrounded by a number of radially symmetrical outward projecting rays, to which are attached bivalve-shaped pollen sacs/synangia. The number of rays varies from 9/10 to 30, depending on the species, and the total diameter from 3 centimetres (1.2 in) to over 20 centimetres (7.9 in). Both the cup and rays usually (but not always) have substantial thickness, in some of the thicker species the structure is noticeably woody. The pollen is monocolpate and elliptical. In some species, additional rays project over the central cup, and attractants/resinous substances are present within the cup. The rays also sometimes have ridges, trichomes, appendages, striae and/or unipinnate (pedicellate) pollen sacs present. Species of Weltrichia appear to have primarily been wind pollinated, though some species may have been pollinated by insects, such as beetles. They were borne by the same plants that also bore female ovulate cones assigned to Williamsonia. It is unclear whether the parent plants were monoecious (having both structures on one plant) or dioecious (where each plant only has one gender of reproductive organ). At least some bearers of Weltrichia, such as Kimuriella from Late Jurassic of Japan were low growing divaricately branching shrubs with a maximum height of 2–3 metres, while others such as Williamsonia gigas may have been more cycad-like in morphology.

== Distribution ==
Weltrichia is known from Asia, Europe, and North America, as well as India (which formed part of the separate landmass Gondwana at the time), spanning from the Late Triassic to the Late Jurassic/Early Cretaceous.

== Species ==
After Popa (2019) and subsequent literature.

| Species | Location | Age | Notes | Image |
|---|---|---|---|---|
| Weltrichia alfredii | Romania | Early Jurassic (Sinemurian) | About 120 mm in diameter | |
| Weltrichia alpina | Germany | Late Triassic | About 54 mm in diameter | |
| Weltrichia antonii | Romania | Early Jurassic (Sinemurian) | About 100 mm in diameter, with only 9/10 rays, has the lowest number of rays of any species | |
| Weltrichia ayuquiliana | Mexico | Middle Jurassic | Around 60 mm in diameter | |
| Weltrichia daohugouensis | China | Middle Jurassic | Around 100 mm in diameter | |
| Weltrichia fabrei | France | Late Triassic-Early Jurassic | Only known from fragmentary remains | |
| Weltrichia givulescui | Romania | Early Jurassic (Sinemurian) | Maximum of 100 mm in diameter | |
| Weltrichia harrisiana | India | Middle Jurassic | Approximately 120–150 mm in diameter | |
| Weltrichia hirsuta | Iran | Early Jurassic | Approximately 130–140 mm in diameter | |
| Weltrichia huangbanjingouensis | China | Late Jurassic/Early Cretaceous | Only central cup is preserved | |
| Weltrichia johannae | Romania | Early Jurassic (Sinemurian) | 70 mm in diameter | |
| Weltrichia maldaensis | India | Late Jurassic | 70 mm in diameter | |
| Weltrichia microdigitata | Mexico | Middle Jurassic | Diameter of only 30 mm, making it smallest known species | |
| Weltrichia mirabilis (type) | Germany | Early Jurassic | Approximately 100 mm in diameter | |
| Weltrichia mixtequensis | Mexico | Middle Jurassic | Diameter of 160 mm | |
| Weltrichia oolithica | Italy | Late Jurassic | 70–80 mm in diameter, holotype specimen currently unlocated | |
| Weltrichia pecten | England | Middle Jurassic | Typically 100–120 mm in diameter. Has been suggested to be synonymous with Weltrichia spectabilis and Weltrichia whitbiensis. | |
| Weltrichia primaeva | Iran | Early Jurassic | Only known from large (over 60 mm in length) ray fragments with a complex morphology | |
| Weltrichia santalensis | India | Middle-Late Jurassic | With a diameter of 220–230 mm, it is one of the largest species in the genus | |
| Weltrichia setosa | England | Middle Jurassic | Typically 120 mm in diameter. | |
| Weltrichia sol | England | Middle Jurassic | One of the largest species, at 170–200 mm in diameter, associated with the female cone Williamsonia gigas and the leaves Zamites gigas | |
| Weltrichia spectabilis | England | Middle Jurassic | Central cup 40 mm in diameter and rays 30-50 mm in length, which bear apical filiform whiskers, which can reach 30-60 mm in length. Has been suggested to be synonymous with Weltrichia pecten and Weltrichia whitbiensis. | |
| Weltrichia steierdorfensis | Romania | Early Jurassic (Sinemurian) | Around 105–120 mm in diameter | |
| Weltrichia whitbiensis | England | Middle Jurassic | Around 120–130 mm in diameter. Has been suggested to be synonymous with Weltrichia pecten and Weltrichia spectabilis. | |
| Weltrichia magna | Mexico | Middle Jurassic | Around 226 mm in diameter. | |
| Weltrichia xochitetlii | Mexico | Middle Jurassic | Approximately 30–45 mm in diameter | |
