= Monanthesia =

Monanthesia Temporal range: Early Cretaceous

Scientific classification
- Kingdom: Plantae
- Clade: Tracheophytes
- Order: †Bennettitales
- Family: †Cycadeoidaceae
- Genus: †Monanthesia; Wieland, 1934

Species
- †M. saxbyana R.Br.; †M. magnifica; †M. gigantea

Extinct genus of plants

Monanthesia is an extinct genus of bennettitalean plant that is known from fossil finds in Europe and North America, which existed during the Early Cretaceous period.

== Species ==
At least three species have been named:

- Monanthesia saxbyana
- Monanthesia magnifica
- Monanthesia gigantea
