= Cycadeoidaceae =

Cycadeoidaceae Temporal range: Cretaceous
- Life reconstruction of Cycadeoidea

Scientific classification
- Kingdom: Plantae
- Clade: Tracheophytes
- Order: †Bennettitales
- Family: †Cycadeoidaceae

Genera
- Cycadeoidea; Monanthesia

Extinct family of plants

Cycadeoidaceae is a family of bennettitalean plants which flourished in the Mesozoic era. Two genera, Cycadeoidea and Monanthesia, are currently recognised though most species are poorly known. They had a similar morphology to cycads, with thick, branchless trunks covered in scale leaves.

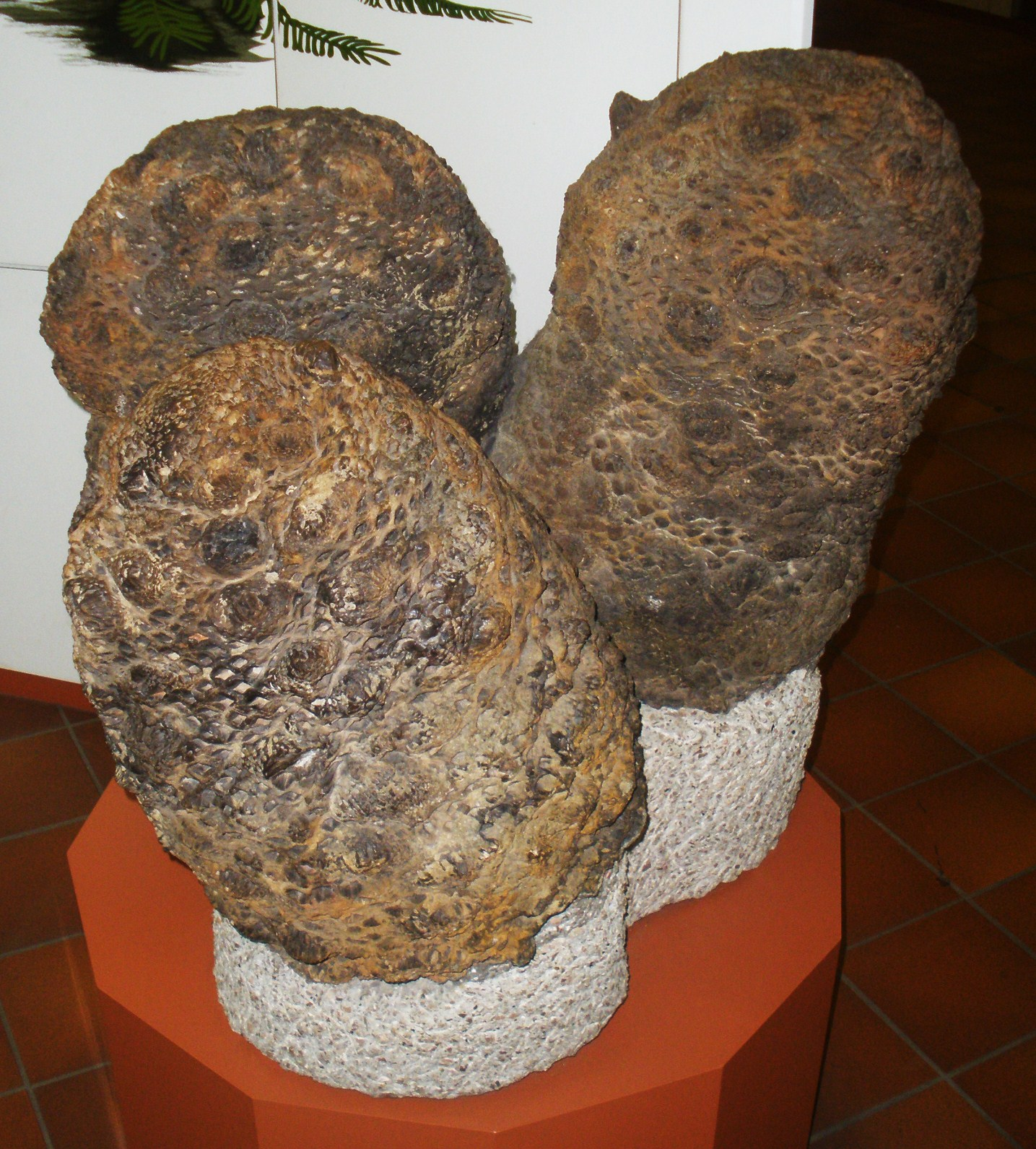
Cycadeoidea (a member of the Cycadeoidaceae) on display at the Naturmuseum Senckenberg
