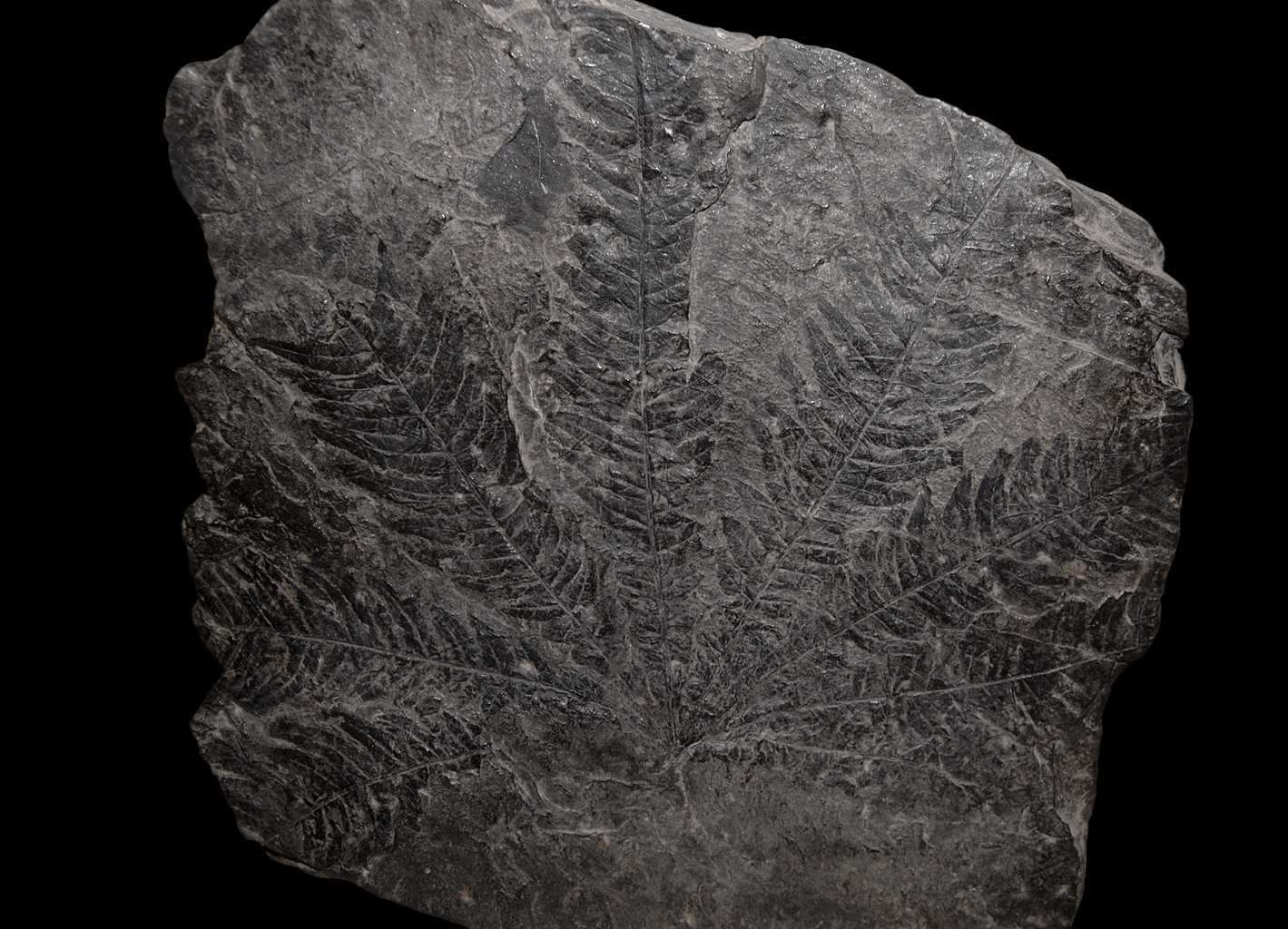
- Otozamites Anina

Scientific classification
- Kingdom: Plantae
- Clade: Tracheophytes
- Order: †Bennettitales
- Family: †Williamsoniaceae
- Genus: †Otozamites; C.F.W.Braun

Type species
- †Otozamites brevifolius

Other species
- O. meyenii

= Otozamites =

Otozamites Temporal range: Upper Triassic–Lower Cretaceous

Extinct genus of seed plants

Otozamites is a genus of plants in the order Bennettitales and the family Williamsoniaceae. The leaves are usually ovate to slightly lanceolate and have branched veins. The genus is found on all continents, although it is more widespread in Eurasia.

== Description ==
The compound leaf is arranged in a row of pinnae, the petioles are alternate and adjacent, and have an earring-shaped base that is attached to the stem at only one point. The veins emerge from a point and radially intersect the entire margin of the pinnule in succession. The base is bayonet-shaped or linear-bayonet-shaped, rarely oval. The pinnules are usually ovate to ovate-bayonet-shaped and are located obliquely on the upper surface of the stem. The base of the pinnules is usually asymmetrical, such that the upper earring is often more developed than the lower earring. The veins are radial, divergent, and bifurcate once or more times. (Description of the type species Otozamites bechei (Brongniart, 1825) Braun, 1842)

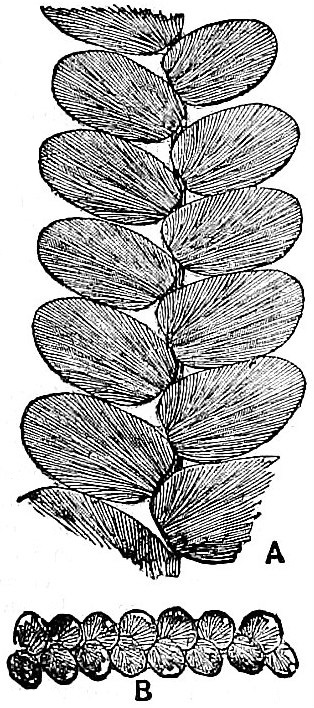
Drawing of two Otozamites fossils from Inferior Oolite, England: A, O. Beani. B, O. Bunburyanus.
