= Rotzo Formation =

Jurassic geological formation in Italy

- Stratigraphic range: Pliensbachian; ~192.30–185.99 Ma
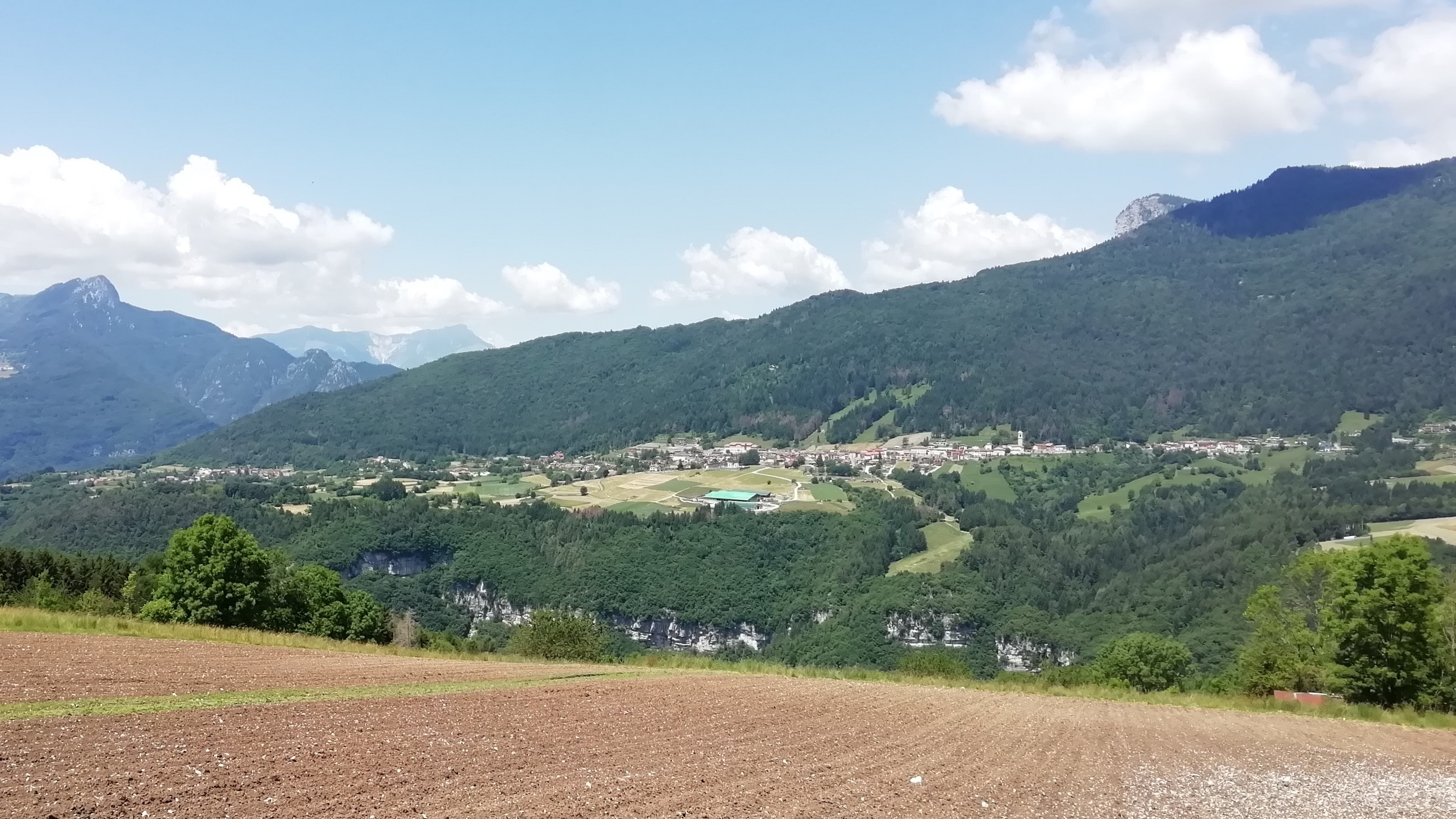
- Panorama of the Rotzo area with several of the Outcrops visible: Tonezza mountain at the left, Val d´Assa cliff in the center-front and Campolongo mountain in the right
- Type: Geological formation
- Unit of: Calcari Grigi Group
- Sub-units: Tovel Member
- Underlies: Massone Oolitic Limestone
- Overlies: Monte Zugna Formation; Loppio Oolitic Limestone
- Area: Trento Platform
- Thickness: 250 m

Lithology
- Primary: Lithified gray silty marl, gray grainstone, bioturbated/intraclastic/ooidal gray wackestone, mud banks and sand deposits.
- Other: Light-grey to yellowish-grey packstone with oolites, bioclasts, algal lumps, pellets, dasycladacean algae, foraminifera, lituolids, and miliolids

Location
- Location: Vicenza Province: Trentino-Alto Adige, Southern Alps
- Coordinates: 45.7°N 11.1°E
- Approximate paleocoordinates: 32.1°S 16.7°E
- Region: Veneto
- Country: Italy

Type section
- Named for: Rotzo
- Rotzo Formation (Italy)

The Rotzo Formation (also known in older literature as the Noriglio Grey Limestone Formation) is a geological formation in Italy, dating to roughly between 192 and 185 million years ago and covering the Pliensbachian stage of the Jurassic Period in the Mesozoic Era. Known mostly for being the main formation with recorded Plicatostylidae reefs, yet dinosaur tracks have been reported from the formation.

== Paleoenvironment ==
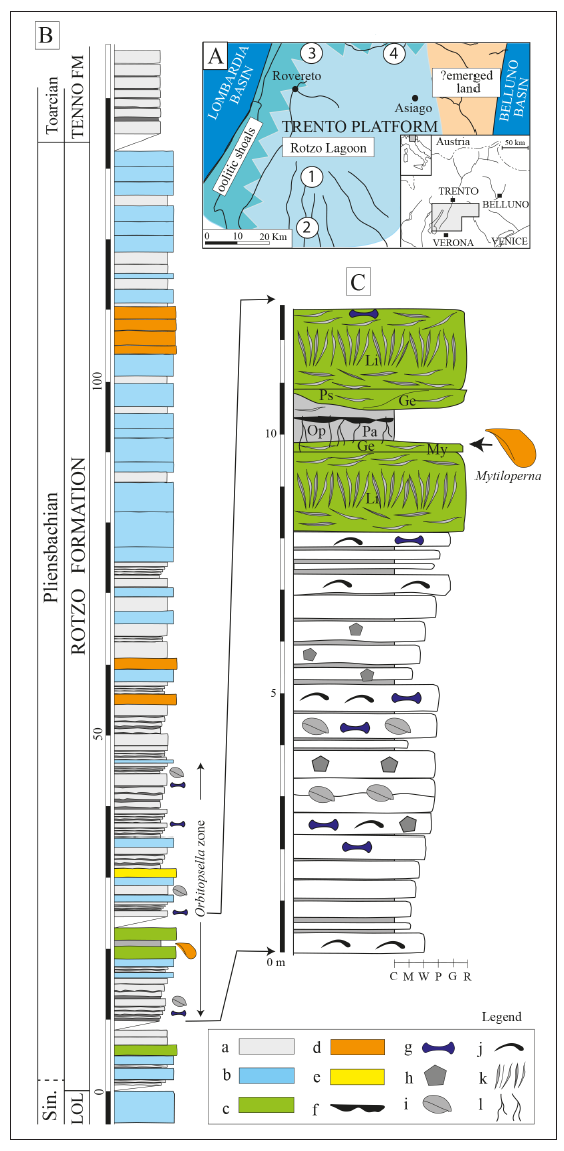
Succession of the Formation in Vajo dell'Anguilla (Verona Province)

Has been traditionally classified as a Sinemurian-Pliensbachian Formation, but a large and detailed dataset of isotopic ^{13}C and ^{87}Sr/^{86}Sr data, estimated the Rotzo Formation to span only over the Early Pliensbachian, bracketed between the Jamesoni-Davoei biozones, marked in the Loppio Oolitic Limestone-Rotzo Fm contact by a carbon isotope excursion onset similar to the Sinemu-Pliens boundary event, while the other sequences fit with the a warm phase that lasts until the Davoei biozone. A more recent work reinforced this datation, constraining the lowermost levels to 192.30 Ma and the uppermost to 185.99 Ma. The Rotzo Formation represented the Carbonate Platform, being located over the Trento Platform and surrounded by the Massone Oolite (marginal calcarenitic bodies), the Fanes Piccola Encrinite (condensed deposits and emerged lands), the Lombadian Basin Medolo Group and Belluno Basin Soverzene Formation (open marine), and finally towards the south, deep water deposits of the Adriatic Basin. The Pliensbachian Podpeč Limestone of Slovenia, the Aganane Formation & the Calcaires du Bou Dahar of Morocco represent regional equivalents, both in deposition and faunal content.

This formation was deposited within a tropical lagoon environment, similar to modern Bahamas which was protected by oolitic shoals and bars from the open deep sea located to the east (Belluno Basin) and towards the west (Lombardia Basin). It is characterized by a rich paleontological content. It is notable mostly thanks to its great amount of big aberrant bivalves, among which is the genus Lithiotis, described in the second half of the nineteenth century. The unusual shape of Lithiotis and Cochlearites shells, extremely elongated and narrow, characterized by a spoon-like body space placed in a high position, rarely preserved, seems to suggest their adaptation to soft and muddy bottoms with a high sedimentation rate. The Bellori outcrop displays about 20 m of limestones with intercalated clays and marls rich in organic matter and sometimes fossil wood (coal) and amber. The limestones are well stratified, with beds 10 cm to more than one metre thick, whereas the clayey levels range between 3 and 40 cm in thickness.

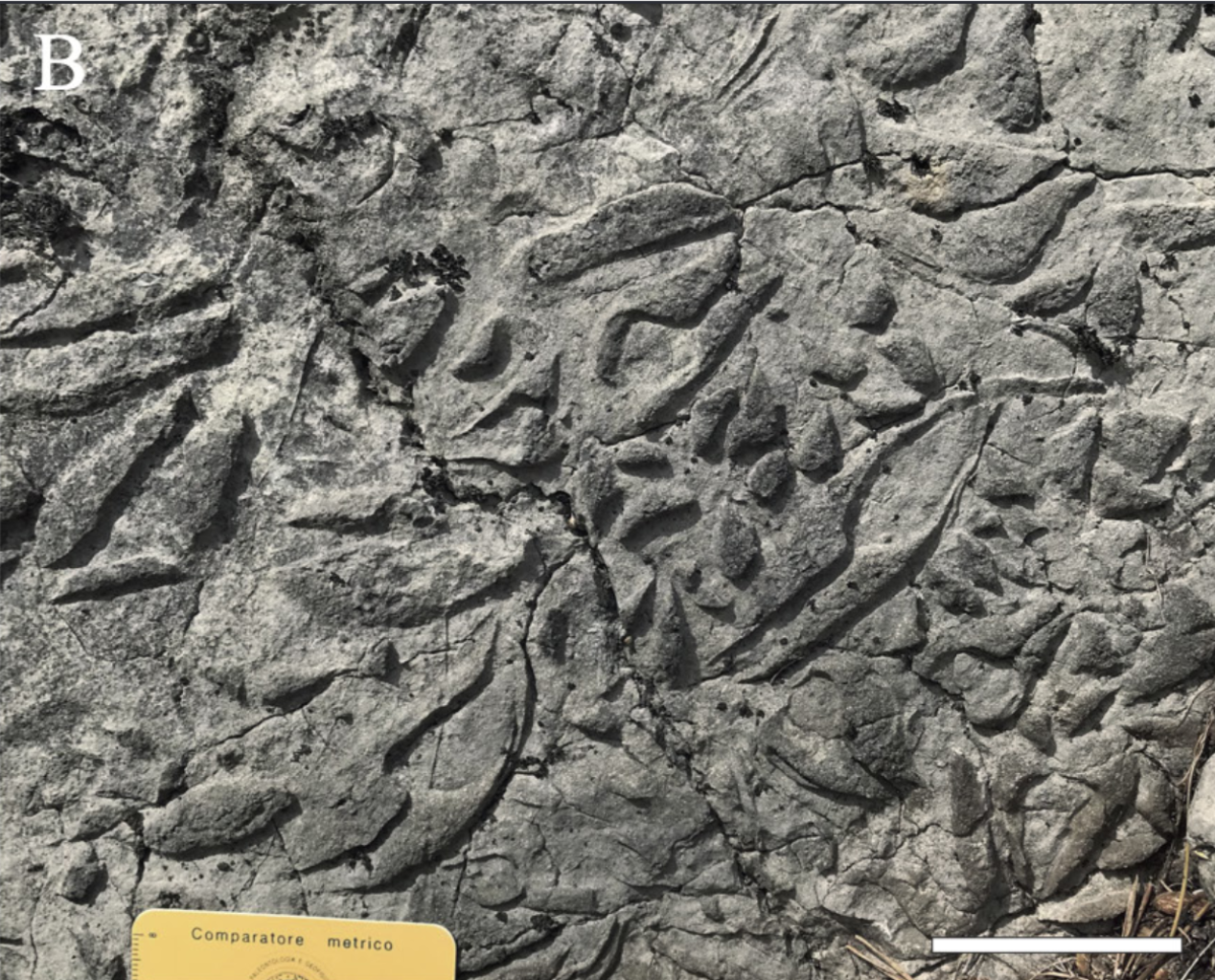
An in-situ bed of Pachygervillia from the lower Rotzo Formation

The sedimentary cover of the Southern Alps has been recognized as a well-preserved section of the Mesozoic Tethys' southern continental margin, featuring a horst and graben structure linked to the rifting associated with the opening of the central North Atlantic that in the Late Triassic and Early Jurassic, created elevated blocks separated by troughs. While the western margin (Piedmont and Lombardy) quickly submerged in the Early Jurassic (As seen by the Moltrasio Formation), the eastern regions maintained shallow water sedimentation, including the Friuli and Trento Platforms, this last one latter evolving into a pelagic plateau, and separated from the Lombardian basin by the Garda escarpment fault system.

The Early Jurassic Calcari Grigi Group represents the shallow-water sedimentation phase of the Trento Platform, revealing several sites over an area of about 1,500 km^{2}. The continuity of dinosaur tracks from the Hettangian-Pliensbachian interval indicates a stable connection between the Southern Alps' carbonate tidal flats and nearby vegetated lands and freshwater sources, although the exact locations of these lands remain uncertain. Detailed sedimentological studies of the Calcari Grigi Group, particularly the Rotzo Formation, describe it as a shallow subtidal platform with an inner lagoon bordered by oolitic shoals.

The Coste dell'Anglone ichnosite for example, situated on the margin of this lagoon within a sandy barrier complex, was influenced by pioneer plants like Hirmeriellaceae in semi-arid conditions. Sedimentary structures indicate a shallow water tidal environment with heterolithic stratification pointing to steady flows at low current velocities. The presence of dinosaur tracks and supratidal markers suggests repeated subaerial exposure, contrasting with previous interpretations of the site as fully subtidal.

These findings align with the lagoon-barrier island complex scenario, featuring a subtidal ramp gently inclined to the west and an intertidal-supratidal barrier island complex trending approximately N-S, now corresponding to the Mt. Brento-Biaina and Mt. Baldo chains.

== Biota ==
=== Amoebae ===
Color key
Taxon	Reclassified taxon	Taxon falsely reported as present	Dubious taxon or junior synonym	Ichnotaxon	Ootaxon	Morphotaxon

Notes
Uncertain or tentative taxa are in small text; ~~crossed out~~ taxa are discredited.

The presence of the families Centropyxidae and Difflugiidae testifies the presence of a mixed marine-terrestrial depositional system, lacking large bodies of water.

Genus/Family	Species	Provenance	Material	Notes	Images
Centropyxis	C. sp.	Tonezza del Cimone	Isolated Tests/Shells	A testate amoebae, member of the family Centropyxidae inside Arcellinida.	Extant Centropyxis
Difflugia	D. sp.	Tonezza del Cimone	Isolated Tests/Shells	A testate amoebae, member of the family Difflugiidae inside Arcellinida.	Extant Difflugia
Pontigulasia	P. sp.	Tonezza del Cimone	Isolated Tests/Shells	A testate amoebae, member of the family Difflugiidae inside Arcellinida.	Extant Pontigulasia

=== Foranimifera ===
Genus/Family	Species	Provenance	Material	Notes	Images
Agerina	A. martana	Altopiano di Asiago; Tonezza del Cimone; Altopiano di Folgaria; Recoaro; Gruppo del Pasubio; Monte Baldo; Monte Scandolara	Isolated Tests/Shells	A foraminifer of the Cornuspiridae family	
Ammobaculites	A. coprolithiformis	Altopiano di Asiago; Tonezza del Cimone; Altopiano di Folgaria; Recoaro; Gruppo del Pasubio; Monte Baldo; Monte Scandolara	Isolated Tests/Shells	A foraminifer of the family Ammomarginulininae.	
Amijiella	A. amiji	Altopiano di Asiago; Tonezza del Cimone; Altopiano di Folgaria; Recoaro; Gruppo del Pasubio; Monte Baldo; Monte Scandolara	Isolated Tests/Shells	A foraminifer of the Hauraniidae family	
Bosniella	B. oenensis	Altopiano di Asiago; Tonezza del Cimone; Altopiano di Folgaria; Recoaro; Gruppo del Pasubio; Monte Baldo; Monte Scandolara	Isolated Tests/Shells	A foraminifer of the Biokovinidae family	
Cymbriaella	C. Iorigae	Monte di Campoluzzo; Alpe Alba	Isolated Tests/Shells	A foraminifer of the Hauraniidae family	
Duotaxis	D. metula	Altopiano di Asiago; Tonezza del Cimone; Altopiano di Folgaria; Recoaro; Gruppo del Pasubio; Monte Baldo; Monte Scandolara	Isolated Tests/Shells	A foraminifer of the Duotaxidae family	
Everticyclammina	E. praevirguliana	Camporosa; Rotzo; Monte Cimoncello di Toraro; Monte di Campoluzz	Isolated Tests/Shells	A foraminifer of the Everticyclamminidae family.	
Frondicularia	F. sp.	Bellori; Garzon di Scotto; Ponte dell`Anguillara	Isolated Tests/Shells	A foraminifer of the family Nodosariinae.	
Glomospira	G. sp.	Altopiano di Asiago; Tonezza del Cimone; Altopiano di Folgaria; Recoaro; Gruppo del Pasubio; Monte Baldo; Monte Scandolara	Isolated Tests/Shells	A foraminifer of the family Ammodiscidae.	
Haurania	H. amiji; H. deserta; H. ssp.	Altopiano di Asiago; Tonezza del Cimone; Altopiano di Folgaria; Recoaro; Gruppo del Pasubio; Monte Baldo; Monte Scandolara; Bellori; Garzon di Scotto; Ponte dell`Anguillara	Isolated Tests/Shells	A foraminifer of the family Hauraniinae.	
Kristanita	K. inflata	Altopiano di Asiago; Tonezza del Cimone; Altopiano di Folgaria; Recoaro; Gruppo del Pasubio; Monte Baldo; Monte Scandolara	Isolated Tests/Shells	A foraminifer of the Duotaxidae family	
Lituosepta	L. recoarensis; L. compressa; L. ssp.	Altopiano di Asiago; Tonezza del Cimone; Altopiano di Folgaria; Recoaro; Gruppo del Pasubio; Monte Baldo; Monte Scandolara; Bellori; Ponte dell`Anguillara	Isolated Tests/Shells	A foraminifer of the Mesoendothyridae family.	
Meandrovoluta	M. asiagoensis	Altopiano di Asiago; Tonezza del Cimone; Altopiano di Folgaria; Monte Baldo	Isolated Tests/Shells	A foraminifer of the Cornuspiridae family	
Mayncina	M. termieri	Garzon di Scotto; Bellori; Ponte dell`Anguillara	Isolated Tests/Shells	A foraminifer of the Mayncinidae family	
Orbitopsella	O. primaeva; O. preacursor; O. dubari; O. circumvulvata; O. spp.	Altopiano di Asiago; Tonezza del Cimone; Altopiano di Folgaria; Recoaro; Gruppo del Pasubio; Monte Baldo; Campomolon; Bellori; Ponte dell`Anguillara; Sega di Noriglio; Rotzo; Val d'Assa; Monte Gallo	Isolated Tests/Shells	A foraminifer of the Mesoendothyridae family.	
Ophtalmidium	O. concentricum; O. sp.	Altopiano di Asiago; Tonezza del Cimone; Altopiano di Folgaria; Recoaro; Gruppo del Pasubio; Monte Baldo; Monte Scandolara	Isolated Tests/Shells	A foraminifer of the family Ophthalmidiidae.	
Paleomayncina	P. termieri	Altopiano di Asiago; Tonezza del Cimone; Altopiano di Folgaria; Recoaro; Gruppo del Pasubio; Monte Baldo; Monte Scandolara	Isolated Tests/Shells	A foraminifer of the Planiseptinae family.	
Pseudocyclammina	P. liasica; P. spp.	Altopiano di Asiago; Tonezza del Cimone; Altopiano di Folgaria; Recoaro; Gruppo del Pasubio; Monte Baldo; Monte Scandolara	Isolated Tests/Shells	A foraminifer of the Pfenderinidae family.	
Pseudopfenderina	P. cf. butterlini	Altopiano di Asiago; Tonezza del Cimone; Altopiano di Folgaria; Recoaro; Gruppo del Pasubio; Monte Baldo; Monte Scandolara	Isolated Tests/Shells	A foraminifer of the Pseudopfenderininae family.	

=== Sponges ===
Genus/Family	Species	Provenance	Material	Notes	Images
Ceractinomorpha indet.	Indeterminate	Vette Feltrine	Colonial Imprints	A Demosponge.	
Bauneia	B. zignoi	Monte Alba; Roverè di Velo; Rovereto	Imprints	A Demosponge, member of Chaetetidae.	
Ellipsactinia	E. bonomi	Vette Feltrine	Colonial Imprints	A Demosponge, Incertade Sedis.	
Hexactinellid indet.	Indeterminate	Vette Feltrine	Colonial Imprints	A Glass sponge.	
Pseudoseptifer	P. beneckei; P. waehneri	Lancia refuge; Alpe Alba; Col Santo; Roverè di Velo	Colonial Imprints	A Demosponge, member of Suberitidae. Monospecific assamblages with encrusting and symbiont forms are found abundantly on lagoonal facies, distributed in several stratigraphic horizons.	Modern relative, Aaptos tenta
Stylothalamia	S. spp.	Vette Feltrine	Colonial Imprints	A Demosponge, member of Verticillitidae.	
Tetractinomorpha indet.	Indeterminate	Vette Feltrine	Colonial Imprints	A Demosponge.	

=== Anthozoa ===
Genus/Family	Species	Provenance	Material	Notes	Images
Isastrea	I. sp.	Rotzo	Colonial Imprints	A Scleractinian Coral, member of Montlivaltiidae. This Coral is often found in the Early Jurassic Tethys range, from the Iberian peninsula to Morocco.	
Montlivaltia	M. trochoidiformis	Rotzo; Sega di Noriglio	Colonial Imprints	A Scleractinian Coral, member of Montlivaltiidae.	
Oppelismilia	O. sp.	Rotzo	Imprints	A Scleractinian Coral, member of Oppelismiliidae.	
Pinacophyllum	cf. P. sp.	Rotzo	Colonial Imprints	A Scleractinian Coral, member of Stylophyllidae	
Stylophyllopsis	S. ex gr. rudis	Rotzo	Colonial Imprints	A Scleractinian Coral, member of Stylophyllidae	
Synastrea	S. sp.	Rotzo	Colonial Imprints	A Scleractinian Coral, member of Synastraeidae	

=== Bryozoa ===
Genus/Family	Species	Provenance	Material	Notes	Images
Orbipora	O. circumvulvata	Sega di Noriglio	Imprints	A Stenolaematan of the family Aisenvergiidae	

=== Brachiopod ===
Genus/Family	Species	Provenance	Material	Notes	Images
Gibbirhynchia	G. curviceps	Sospirolo	Shells	A Rhynchonellidan, member of Gibbirhynchiinae. Unusual genus in the Mediterranean region, more common on NW Europe	
Hesperithyris	H. renieri	Cornacalda; Roveredo	Shells	A Rhynchonellidan, member of Zeilleriidae.	
Linguithyris	L. aspasia	Ballino; Sospirolo	Shells	A Terebratulidan, member of Nucleatidae. Typical Mediterranean region taxon in the Pliensbachian	
Liospiriferina	L. obtusa; L. torbolensis	Cortina d'Ampezzo; Sospirolo; Torbole; Roveredo	Shells	A spiriferidan, member of Spiriferinidae.	
Liothyrina	L. norigliensis	Rotzo; Sega di Noriglio; Cornacalda	Shells	A Terebratulidan, member of Terebratellidae.	
Lobothyris	L. punctata	Cornacalda; Roveredo	Shells	A Terebratulidan, member of Lobothyrididae.	
Lychnothyris	L. rotzoana	Sette Comuni; Erbezzo; Vajo dell'Anguilla; Cimoncello di Toraro; Campomolon; Monte Toraro; Tonezza-Folgaria	Shells	A Terebratulidan, member of Plectoconchidae. The main Branchiopod locally associated with Lithiotid facies, where they formed rare mass occurrences.	
Merophricus	M. mediterranea	Val d'Assa	Shells	A Terebratulidan, member of Plectoconchidae.	
Plectothyris	P.? fimbrioides	Cornacalda; Roveredo	Shells	A Terebratulidan, member of Loboidothyrididae.	
Prionorhynchia	P.? flabellum	Cortina d'Ampezzo; Sospirolo	Shells	A spiriferidan, member of Spiriferinidae.	
Spiriferina	S. torbolensis	Roveredo	Shells	A spiriferidan, member of Spiriferinidae.	
Waldheimia	W. hexagona	Roveredo	Shells	A Terebratulidan, member of Terebratellidae.	

=== Mollusks ===
Genus/Family	Species	Provenance	Material	Notes	Images
Androgynoceras	A. striatum	Vedana near Sospirolo	Shells	An ammonite of the family Liparoceratidae.	Androgynoceras
Anisocardia	A. sp.	Monte Toraro	Shells	A clam, member of Arcticidae.	
Anticonulus	A. acutus	Certosa di Vedana	Shells	A Top Snail of the family Trochidae.	
Aptyxiella	A. norigliensis; A. desvoidyiformis; A. spp.	Bellori; Between Pedescala and Castelletto; Between Ferrazza and Campodalbero; Nosellari; Sega di Noriglio; Chiesa; Carbonare; Osteria alla Stanga; Between Chiesa S.Martino and Zaffoni; Between Boccaldo and Pozza; Rovereto; Leno di Terragnolo	Shells	A snail of the family Nerinellidae. Dominant gastropod, a large taxon (+15 cm) found in gregarious communities.	
Astarte	A. kamarika; A. depressaeformis	Serrada; Albaredo; Castel Lizzana; Rotzo; Cornacalda	Shells	A clam, member of Astartidae.	Extant specimen of the genus
Ataphrus	A. (Ataphrus) latilabrus; A. (Ataphrus) cordevolensis	Certosa di Vedana	Shells	A snail of the family Ataphridae.	
Austriacopsis	A. austriaca	Certosa di Vedana	Shells	A keyhole limpet of the family Fissurellidae.	
Avicula	A. spinicosta	Noriglio	Shells	A clam, member of Aviculidae.	
Cardinia	C. rotzoana	Rotzo	Shells	A clam, member of Cardiniidae.	
Ceromya	C. tirolensis	Sega di Noriglio; Cornacalda; Rotzo; Serrada	Shells	A piddock, member of Ceromyidae.	
Ceritella	C. rotzoana	Rotzo	Shells	A snail of the family Cerithiidae.	
Cerithium	C. rotzoanum	Rotzo	Shells	A snail of the family Cerithiidae.	Extant specimen of the genus
Charmasseiceras	C. sp.	Serrada, Folgaria	Shells	An ammonite of the family Schlotheimiidae.	
Cochlearites	C. loppianus	Vaio del Paradiso; Bellori; Vaio dell'Anguilla; Campodalbero; Pasubio; Albaredo; Giazzera; Valgola; Valbona; Rotzo; Mezzaselv	Shells	An oyster, member of Plicatostylidae. It is one of the Three main bivalves recovered on the Lithiotis Facies.	Cochlearites
Cylindrites	C. bullatiformis	Rotzo	Shells	A barrel bubble snail of the family Acteonidae.	
Cucullaea	C. cf.hettangiensis	Rotzo; Roveredo	Shells	A clam, member of Cucullaeidae.	Extant specimen of the genus
Cypricardinia	C. incurvata; C. sp.	Noriglio; Cornacalda; Rotzo; Serrada	Shells	A clam, member of Trapezidae.	
Cyprina	C. candataeformis; C. grandiformis	Rotzo	Shells	A clam, member of Arcticidae.	
Discohelix	D. excavata	Certosa di Vedana	Shells	A snail of the family Discohelicidae.	Specimen of the genus
Emarginula	E. (Emarginula) vadanaei; E. orthogonia	Certosa di Vedana; Val d'Arsa	Shells	A keyhole limpet of the family Fissurellidae.	Extant specimen of the genus
Eomiodon	E. serradensis	Vaio del Paradiso; Bellori; Serrada bei Rovereto; Vaio dell'Anguilla; Campodalbero; Pasubio; Albaredo; Giazzera; Valgola; Valbona; Rotzo; Mezzaselv	Shells	A clam, member of Neomiodontidae. The so-called Eomiodon horizon represents the lower Rotzo Formation, with this genus considered an opportunistic shallow infaunal suspension feeder, and the marker genus for brackish environments.	
Eucyclus	E. (Lokuticyclus) kericserensis	Certosa di Vedana	Shells	A snail of the family Eucyclidae.	Extant specimen of the genus
Fuciniceras	F. suejense; F. cornacaldense; F. portisi	Fontana di Naole; Cornacalda, Rovereto	Shells	An Ammonite of the Family Hildoceratidae	Fuciniceras
Gastrochaenolites	G. messisbugi	Column at Main Post Office of Ferrara, Italy	Clavate, smooth borings	Borings over Opisoma shells	Example of Gastrochaenolites
Gervillia	G. buchi; G. lamellosa; G. volanensis; G. mandriolana; G. spp.	Vaio del Paradiso; Bellori; Vaio dell'Anguilla; Campodalbero; Pasubio; Albaredo; Giazzera; Valgola; Valbona; Rotzo; Mezzaselv; Noriglio; Cornacalda; Serrada	Shells	An Oyster, member of Bakevelliidae. Found on greater accumulations on lower shale-dominated levels	Specimen of the genus
Gervilleioperna	G. ombonii; G. sp.	Vaio del Paradiso; Bellori; Vaio dell'Anguilla; Campodalbero; Pasubio; Albaredo; Giazzera; Valgola; Valbona; Rotzo; Mezzaselv	Shells	An oyster, member of Plicatostylidae. On the Rotzo formation this genus become abundant along rootlets, indicative of a very shallow and restricted lagoon or marsh environment.	Gervillioperna
Globularia	G. sp.	Tonezza del Cimone	Shells	A snail of the family Ampullinidae.	Extant specimen of the genus
Gresslya	G. elongata; G. mandriolana	Vajo dell'Anguilla; Cimoncello di Toraro; Campo Mandriolo; Campomolon; Noriglio	Shells	A clam, member of Ceratomyidae.	
Gryphaea	G. mimaeformis	Rotzo	Shells	A clam, member of Gryphaeidae.	
Guidonia	G. pseudorotula	Certosa di Vedana	Shells	A snail of the family Trochonematidae.	
Homomya	H. cf. punctifera	Sega di Noriglio	Shells	A clam, member of Pleuromyidae.	
Juraphyllites	J. libertus	Contrada Ronchi; Vedana near Sospirolo	Shells	Type member of the family Juraphyllitidae.	Juraphyllites
Lima	L. norigliensis; L. choffati; L. gigantea	Cornacalda; Sega di Noriglio	Shells	A clam, member of Limidae.	Extant specimen of the genus
Liostrea	L. sublamellosa; L. sp.	Sega di Noriglio	Shells	A oyster, member of the family Flemingostreidae.	
Liparoceras	L. (Becheiceras) bechei	Vedana near Sospirolo	Shells	An ammonite of the family Liparoceratidae.	Liparoceras
Lithophaga	L. tirolensis	Sega di Noriglio	Shells	A mussel, member of the family Mytilidae.	
Lithioperna	L. scutata; L. spp.	Vaio del Paradiso; Bellori; Vaio dell'Anguilla; Campodalbero; Pasubio; Albaredo; Giazzera; Valgola; Valbona; Rotzo; Mezzaselv	Shells	An oyster, member of Plicatostylidae. A large bivalve, up to 70 cm length. This genus was found to be a bivalve with a byssate juvenile stage that developed different modes of life on the adulthood depending on the individual density and bottom firmness.	Lithioperna
Lithiotis	L. problematica; L. spp.	Altipiano d'Asagio; Vaio del Paradiso; Bellori; Vaio dell'Anguilla; Campodalbero; Pasubio; Albaredo; Giazzera; Valgola; Valbona; Rotzo; Mezzaselv	Shells	An oyster, member of Plicatostylidae. It is the major Bivalve identified on the formation, and the genus that gives the name to the "Lithiotis fauna".	Lithiotis
Lucina	L spp.	Val d'Assa; Cornacalda	Shells	A clam, member of Lucinidae.	
Meretrix	M. (Cytherea) serradensis	Serrada bei Rovereto	Shells	A venus clam, member of Veneridae.	Extant specimen of the genus
Modiolus	M. tirolensis; M. cf. hillana; M. cuneataeformis; M. alataeformis; M. schaurothi	Rotzo; Val d'Assa; Val Ghelpa	Shells	A mussel, member of the family Mytilidae.	Extant specimen of the genus
Mytilus	M. mirabilis; M. bittneri; M. lepsii; M. transalpinus; M. cf. pernoides; M. spp.	Vaio del Paradiso; Bellori; Vaio dell'Anguilla; Val d'Assa; Sega di Noriglio; Cornacalda; Mandrielle; Monte Gaza; Ciago bei Verzano; Campodalbero; Pasubio; Albaredo; Giazzera; Valgola; Valbona; Rotzo; Mezzaselv; Monte Gaza; Verzano	Shells	A mussel, member of the family Mytilidae	Extant specimen of the genus
Natica	N. tridentina; N. spp.	Albaredo bei Roveredo; Noriglio	Shells	A moon snail of the family Naticidae.	Extant specimen of the genus
Neritopsis	N. fabianii; N. minulaeformis; N. spp.	Rotzo; Certosa di Vedana; Bellori	Shells	A snail of the family Neritopsidae.	Extant specimen of the genus
Opisoma	O. excavatum; O. menchikoffi	Vaio del Paradiso; Bellori; Vaio dell'Anguilla; Campodalbero; Pasubio; Albaredo; Giazzera; Valgola; Valbona; Rotzo; Mezzaselv	Shells	A clam, member of Astartidae. Is considered a genus that evolved from shallow burrowing ancestors, becoming a secondarily semi-infaunal edgewise recliner adapted to photosymbiosis.	
Pachygervillia	P. anguillaensis; P. taramellii	Vaio dell'Anguilla; Vajo del Paradiso; Val di Sella; Viote section	Shells	An oyster, member of Plicatostylidae.	Pachygervillia
Pachyrisma	P. (Pachymegalodon) chamaeformis; P. vaceki; P. trigonalis; P. (Durga) crassa; P. (Durga) nicolisi; P. ssp.	Bellori; Between Pedescala and Castelletto; Between Ferrazza and Campodalbero; Nosellari; Chiesa; Carbonare; Osteria alla Stanga; Between Chiesa S.Martino and Zaffoni; Between Boccaldo and Pozza; Rovereto; Leno di Terragnolo; Cimoncello di Toraro; Campomolon; Folgaria; Cornacalda	Shells	A clam, member of Megalodontidae.	
Paleonucula	P. sp.	Monte Toraro	Shells	A nut clam of the family Nuculanidae	
Partschiceras	P. tenuistriatum; P. cf. retroplicatum	Vedana near Sospirolo	Shells	An Ammonite of the family Phylloceratidae.	
Patella	P. conoidea; P. costata; P. (Scurria?) tirolensis	Noriglio; Cornacalda; Val d'Arsa	Shells	A limpet of the family Patellidae.	Extant specimen of the genus
Pecten	P. norigliensis; P. textoriformis; P. clathrataeformis; P. lens; P. cf. norigliensis; P. cf. spatulatus	Sega di Noriglio; Cornacalda; Rotzo; Mte. Erio	Shells	A scallop, member of the family Pectinidae.	Extant specimen of the genus
Pholadomya	P. athesiana; P. norigliensis	Vajo dell'Anguilla; Sega di Noriglio; Cimoncello di Toraro; Campomolon; Serrada	Shells	A clam, member of Pholadomyidae.	Specimen of the genus
Pinna	P. sepiaeformis; P. cuneataeformis; P. sp.	Rotzo; Serrada; Roveredo	Shells	An oyster, member of Pinnidae.	Extant specimen of the genus
Placunopsis	P. italica; P. ghelpensis	Val Ghelpa	Shells	A scallop, member of the family Anomiidae.	
Plectotrochus	P. sp.	Certosa di Vedana	Shells	A snail of the family Trochidae.	
Pleurotomaria	P. obesaeformis	Rotzo	Shells	A snail of the family Pleurotomariidae.	Specimen of the genus
Plicatula	P. rotzoana	Rotzo	Shells	A clam, member of Plicatulidae.	Extant specimen of the genus
Pleuromya	P. elegans; P. gibbosiformis; P. jurassiformis; P. cf. elongata	Sega di Noriglio; Cornacalda; Rotzo; Serrada	Shells	A clam, member of Pleuromyidae.	
Proacirsa	P. (Schafbergia) crenata; P. (Schafbergia) zirettoensis	Certosa di Vedana	Shells	A snail of the family Gordenellidae.	
Pronoella	P. sp.	Monte Toraro	Shells	A clam, member of Arcticidae.	
Protodiceras	P. pumilum; P. spp.	Vajo dell'Anguilla; Cimoncello di Toraro; Campomolon	Shells	A clam, member of Megalodontidae.	
Protogrammoceras	P. gr. celebratum-italicum; P. celebratum; P. dilectum	Monte Baldo; Vedana near Sospirolo	Shells	An Ammonite of the family Hildoceratidae.	
Pseudonerinea	P. terebra	Tonezza del Cimone	Shells	A snail of the family Pseudonerineidae.	
Pseudorhytidopilus	P. detonii	Certosa di Vedana	Shells	A limpet of the family Acmaeidae.	
Pseudopachymytilus	P. mirabilis; P. spp.	Vaio del Paradiso; Bellori; Vaio dell'Anguilla; Campodalbero; Pasubio; Albaredo; Giazzera; Valgola; Valbona; Rotzo; Mezzaselv	Shells	A clam, incertae sedis inside Pterioida. On the Rotzo formation this byssate bivalve indicates a shallow subtidal or intertidal environment.	
Pteria	P. volanensis	Vajo dell'Anguilla; Cimoncello di Toraro; Campomolon	Shells	An oyster, member of Pteriidae.	Extant specimen of the genus
Rissoina	R. acutaeformis	Rotzo	Shells	A snail of the family Rissoinidae.	Extant specimen of the genus
Tellina	T?. cornacaldensis	Cornacalda	Shells	A clam, member of Tellinidae.	Extant specimen of the genus
Tretospira	T. tridentina; T. morrisiiformis	Rotzo; Tonezza del Cimone	Shells	A periwinkle of the family Purpurinidae.	
Trochus	T. sinister	Noriglio	Shells	A top snail of the family Trochidae.	Extant specimen of the genus
Turritella	T. rotzoana; T. terebra	Rotzo; Sega di Noriglio; Val d'Assa	Shells	A snail of the family Turritellidae.	Extant specimen of the genus
Unicardium	U. abbreviatiforme; U. zonariaeforme	Rotzo	Shells	An oyster, member of Unicardiidae.	

=== Echinodermata ===
Genus/Family	Species	Provenance	Material	Notes	Images
Asteriacites	A. lumbricalis; A. isp.	Coste dell'Anglone	Star-shaped impressions	Resting trace of brittle stars (Ophiuroidea). Probably from specimens trapped on tidal changes.	Asteriacites specimen
Hypodiadema	H. sp.	Noriglio	Sclerites	A Pseudodiadematidae Euechinoidean	
Pentacrinites	P. basaltiformis	Cornacalda; Roveredo	Columnals	A Sea lily of the family Pentacrinitidae.	Pentacrinites
Polydiadema	P. depressum	Monte Roite	Two specimens (MCV.20/02 and MCV.20/03)	An Emiratiidae Phymosomatoidan.	
Pseudodiadema	P. roveredanum; P. cobellii; P. veronense; P. spp.	Monte Pombo; Sega di Noriglio; Albaredo bei Roveredo.	Multiple specimens	A Pseudodiadematidae Euechinoidean	

=== Arthropoda ===
Genus/Family	Species	Provenance	Material	Notes	Images
Cypris	C. rotzoana	Rotzo; Sega di Noriglio	Valves	An Ostracodan of the family Cyprididae	
Eryma	E. (Phlyctisoma) cf.sinemurianum	Tonezza-Folgaria area	Slightly deformed Exuvia	An Erymid Decapodan Crustacean. With a total length between 9-10 cm is one of the largest specimens belonging to this species.	Example of Eryma specimen
Klieana	K. sp.	Tonezza del Cimone	Valves	An Ostracodan of the family Cytherideidae. The earliest record of the genus.	
Limnocythere	L. sp.	Tonezza del Cimone	Valves	An Ostracodan of the family Limnocytherinae. High probability to be a new species.	
Ophiomorpha	O. irregulaire; O. cf.nodosa; O. isp. A; O.? isp. B	RVB section in Campomolon; Tonezza-Folgaria area	Lined or peloidal burrows	Record “tamping or carrying activities” typical of decapods, identical to modern Callianassa and Upogebia.	Example of Ophiomorpha trace fossil
Phraterfabanella	P. tridentinensis	Tonezza del Cimone	Valves	An Ostracodan of the family Cytherideidae. The assemblage is dominated (>95%) by this taxon.	
Thalassinoides	T. suevicus; T.? isp. B	Campomolon, Valbona; Coste dell'Anglone; Bella Lasta; Stol dei Campiluzzi; Tonezza del Cimone; Vajo dell'Anguilla; Val Gola area of Folgaria; PVB section in Toraro; RVB section in Campomolon; Monte Pasubio; Monte Cimone	Branched burrows	Local forms are likely derived from giant decapods (probably Erymids). Turning chambers are linked to the behaviour of animals such as Callianassa. The atypical "isp. B" resemble more tunnels done by either Stomatopods or Malacostraca.	Example of Thalassinoides specimens.

=== Annelida ===
Genus/Family	Species	Provenance	Material	Notes	Images
Schistomeringos	S. expectatus	Between Ferrazza and Campodalbero; Between Nosellari and Dazio; Between Virti and Osteria alla Stanga; Between Chiesa S. Martino and Zaffoni	Isolated scolecodonts	A polychaete of the family Dorvilleidae. Unlike the modern counterparts that live in deeper environments, this species is found linked with shallow marine facies	Extant specimen of the same genus
Serpula	S. spp.	Noriglio; Bellori; Castelletto; Campodalbero; Nosellari; Chiesa; Carbonare; Rovereto	Isolated or accumulated tubes	A sessile Annelid of the family Serpulidae.	Example of modern Serpulid Tube

=== Ichnofossils ===
Ichnogenus/Ichnofamily	Species	Provenance	Material	Made By	Images
Chomatichnus	C. wegberensis	Campomolon, Valbona	Vertical burrows with preserved entrances	Callianassa; Serpulidae	
Chondrites	C. isp.	RVB section in Campomolon; Tonezza-Folgaria area	Minute branching burrows	Annelids (Polychaeta); Sipuncula	Example of Chondrites trace fossil
Glossifungites	G. isp.	Campomolon, Valbona; Tonezza-Folgaria area	Infilled abandoned burrows by coarse-grained skeletal debris	Priapulida; Serpulidae; Siboglinidae; Sabellidae; Oweniidae	
Skolithos	S. isp.	Campomolon, Valbona; Tonezza-Folgaria area	Vertical burrows	Polychaetes; Phoronidans	Representation of Skolithos along the possible makers.

=== Chondrichthyes ===
Genus/Family	Species	Provenance	Material	Notes	Images
Chimaeriformes? indet.	Indeterminate	Monte Pasubio	Dermal denticle	Incertade Sedis	
Hybodontiformes indet.	Indeterminate	Campiluzzi Tunnel; Monte Pasubio	Isolated teeth & Scales	Incertade Sedis	
Hybodus	H. sp.	Monte Pasubio	Isolated teeth, scales & first dorsal fin spine	A member of the family Hybodontidae.	Hybodus
Piscichnus?	P.? isp.	Tonezza-Folgaria area	Episodic surficial bioturbation	Assigned to mollusc predatory Chondrichthyes (Hybodontidae and Heterodontidae). It also resemble traces left by present day Squatinidae and Guitarfish.	
Strophodus	S. tenuis; S. sp.	Campiluzzi Tunnel; Monte Pasubio; Rotzo	Isolated teeth & Scales	A member of the family Acrodontidae.	

=== Actinopterygii ===
A specimen found in Roverè di Velo, housed in the University of Padua collection under the number 27519 and previously indentified as a marine reptile, was latter found to be a fish lower jaw.

Genus/Family	Species	Provenance	Material	Notes	Images
Apomesodon?	A.? bucklandi; A.? cf. gigas	Rotzo	Fragment of splenial dentition; A large elliptical tooth	A Bony fish of the family Pycnodontidae. Also referred to the genera "Mesodon" and Gyronchus.	
Dorsetichthys?	D.? beggiatianus	Sega di Noriglio	Partial specimen	A potential member of the family Dorsetichthyidae. Inferred as closely repted to "Pholidophorus" bechei (Now D. bechei) or as P.? sp.	Dorsetichthys
Ginglymodi indet.	Indeterminate	Campiluzzi Tunnel; Monte Pasubio	Ganoid scales, teeth, and cranial elements	Previously referred to Semionotiformes and/or the genus Lepidotes.	
Gyrodus?	G. trigonus?; Aff. G.? sp.	Pernigotti; Sega di Noriglio	A semi-articulated specimen; Referred isolated teeth	A Bony fish of the family Gyrodontidae.	Gyrodus
Lepisosteiformes indet.	Indeterminate	Campiluzzi Tunnel; Monte Pasubio	Ganoid scales, teeth, and cranial elements	Previously referred to Semionotiformes and/or the genus Lepidotes.	
Lepidotes?	L.? spp.	Rovere di Velo; Rotzo	Few scales and many teeth, mostly hemispherical	A Bony fish of the family Lepidotidae.	Lepidotes
Pachycormiformes indet.	Indeterminate	Campiluzzi Tunnel; Monte Pasubio	Articulated skeletons	The oldest record of the family.	Pachycormus, example of Pachycormiform
Pholidophoriformes? indet.	Indeterminate	Campiluzzi Tunnel; Monte Pasubio	Articulated skeletons	Incertade Sedis	
Pycnodontiformes indet.	Indeterminate	Campiluzzi Tunnel; Monte Pasubio; Sega di Noriglio; Rotzo	Isolated teeth, mostly molariform	Previously referred to the genus Pycnodus, concretely "P." mantelli (=Turbomesodon).	
Semionotiformes? indet.	Indeterminate	Campiluzzi Tunnel	Isolated teeth & scales	Incertade Sedis	

=== Crocodyliformes ===
Genus/Family	Species	Provenance	Material	Notes	Images
Thalattosuchia indet.	Indeterminate	Monte Pasubio	Isolated teeth	It was cited the presence of fragmentary and poorly preserved remains of "Teleosauridae?".	Example of Thallatosuchian, Macrospondylus

=== Dinosaurs ===
Color key: Taxon / Reclassified taxon / Taxon falsely reported as present / Dubious taxon or junior synonym / Ichnotaxon / Ootaxon / Morphotaxon

Notes
Uncertain or tentative taxa are in small text
~~crossed out~~ taxa are discredited.

Genus/Family	Species	Provenance	Material	Notes	Images
Anchisauripus	A. isp.	Coste dell'Anglone tracksite	Footprints	All tracks were probably produced by individuals with the same functional anatomy of the hind foot.	Anchisauripus may belong to a genus similar to Procompsognathus
Kayentapus	K. ispp.	Bella Lasta tracksite; Coste dell'Anglone tracksite; Stol dei Campiluzzi tracksite	Footprints	The Coste dell´Anglone trackmaker had a pes with the metatarsal III elongated, as found on Dilophosaurus.	Kayentapus footprints may belong to a genus similar to Sarcosaurus
Moyenisauropus?	M.? isp.	Marocche di Dro tracksite	Footprints	The tracks adscribed share some morphological affinity with those referred to the Ankylosauridae, such as the ichnogenera Metatetrapodus and Tetrapodosaurus, and probably belonged to medium-sized Scelidosaurs or other kind of Thyreophorans.	Scelidosaurus feet matches with the Moyenisauropus trackmaker
Sauropoda indet.	Indeterminate	Bella Lasta tracksite; Marocche di Dro tracksite	Footprints	Sauropod tracks. The larger tracks comprise elliptic pes, what are among the largest known dinosaur tracks of the lower jurassic.	Local Sauropod tracks resemble the feet of the genus Vulcanodon
Sauropodomorpha? indet.	Indeterminate	Marocche di Dro tracksite	Footprints	It wears morphological and morphometrical appearance that suggests relationships with a "prosauropod" trackmaker.	The local footprints may have belonged to a genus similar to Lamplughsaura

=== Flora ===
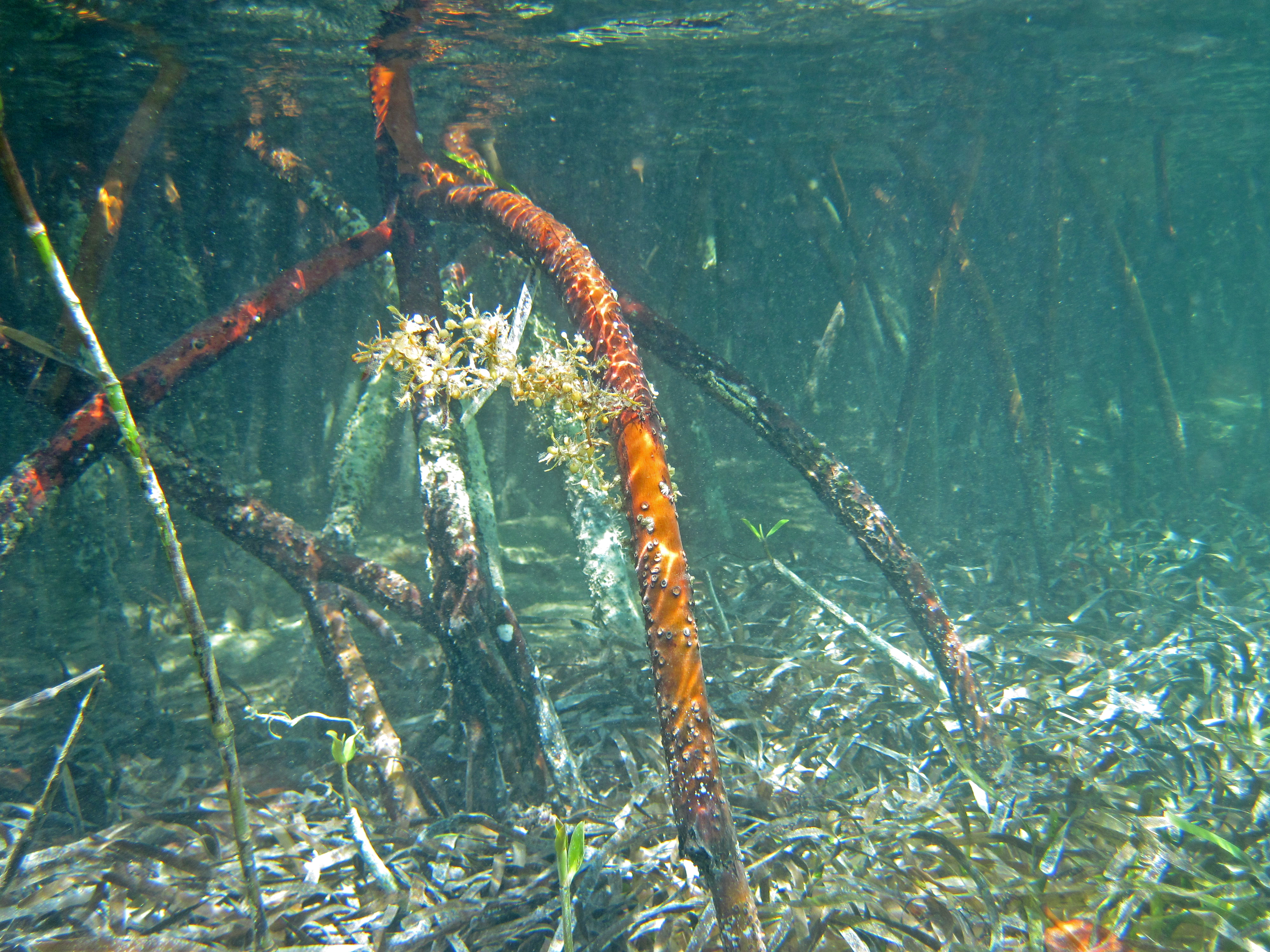
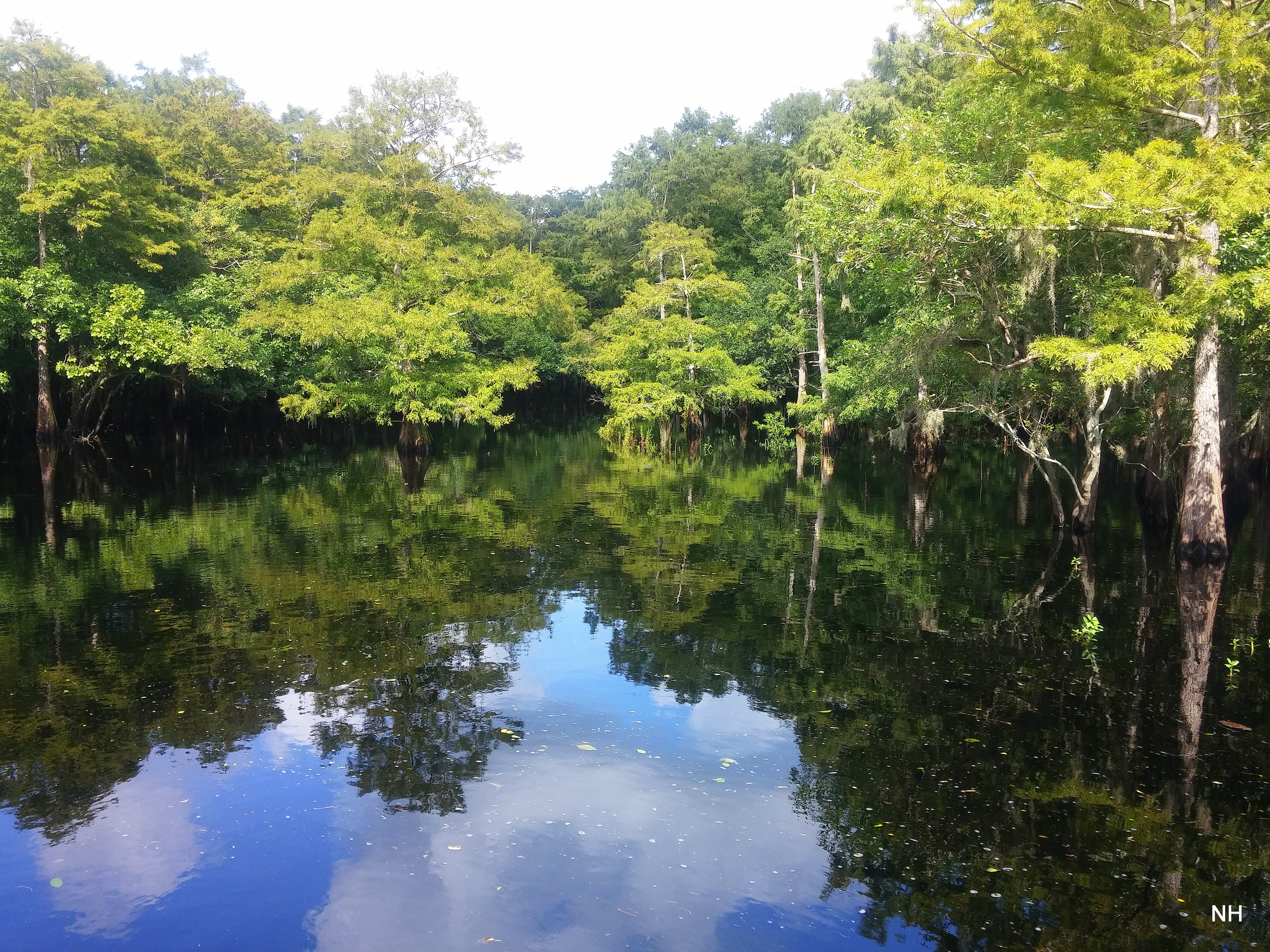
Rotzo Formation nearby land hosted Bahamian-type biomes (San Salvador Island Mangroves in the picture) with nearby "Taxodium swamp"-like coniferous associations dominated by the Pagiophyllum producer

The Rotzo Formation was deposited on a Lagoon on the emerged Trento Platform, leading to a well preserved fossil flora record, collected and studied since the 19th century. The great level of floral fossilization has even allow to discovery fossil amber on the Bellori section. This amber has allowed to determine that the environment was a shallow tropical lagoon, only a few metres deep, closed seawards by oolitic shoals and bars. This levels are dominated by a high abundance of Classopollis sp. (Cheirolepidiaceae), associated with dry and wet climates in coastal areas. The abundance of this group of conifers is also proven by the high presence of cuticles of Pagiophyllum cf. rotzoanum. Beyond this genera, spores are highly diversified, including from Sphenophyta, Selaginellales to Ferns, with abundance (more than 50%) of trilete spores (Deltoidospora), what suggest a good freshwater availability corresponding to a wet climate, proven also by the presence of aquatic miospores of algae such as Botryococcus and Pseudoschizaea. The climate was arid on some seasons with monsoon months. The abundance of marine fauna on this sediments, including fragments of corals, bryozoans, bivalves, echinoids, and foraminifera, suggest transport from brackish lagoons and marshes, probably occurred during storm events. Overall data points to a marshy and/or submerged paleoenvironment, comparable to the present-day Taxodium swamp or cypress swamp and a Bahamian-type marine environment in a rather wet monsoonal climate as in the modern southeastern Asia. The abundant presence of glossy black charcoal little fragments point to wildfires being a consistent local landscape feature.

==== Amber ====
The Rotzo Formation records one of the few Early Jurassic assamblages with Amber in the world, the nicknamed "Bellori amber" found near the village of the same name. Made mostly of small droplets of less than 1 mm with exceptionally preserved morphology its likely the amber producing plants were likely not stressed or affected by disease. Due to the small size animal inclusion have not been found. However various plant materials, identified "mummified wood" and wood tissue are known. Additionally large amounts of Circumpolles Cheirolepidiaceous pollen, and occasional freshwater algae Pseudoschizaea remains are included. Several cuticle fragments are attributed to the araucariaceous or Hirmeriellaceae genus Pagiophyllum. Those lived on a coastal and wet palaeoenvironment similar to the present-day Taxodium swamps with monsoonal seasons as in the modern southern Asia. More recently, an additional outcrop with amber, located in Vajo dell'Anguilla, was recovered, with again samples in thousands of thin filaments.

==== Algae ====
Genus/Family	Species	Provenance	Material	Notes	Images
Palaeodasycladus	P. fragilis; P. gracilis; P. mediterraneus; P. spp.	Coste dell'Anglone; Marocche di Dro; Bellori; Garzon di Scotto; Foza section; Chizzola	Imprints	A green alga of the family Dasycladaceae. A reefal algae usually found in carbonate settings along all the Mediterranean	P. mediterraneus specimens
Pseudoschizaea	P. spp.	Bellori village	Miospores	Likely an alga, maybe Euglenid	
Sestrosphaera	S. liasina	Malga Mandrielle; Bellori; Ponte Basaginocchi; Vajo dell'Anguilla	Imprints	A green alga of the family Triploporellaceae.	
Solenopora	S. cf. liasina	Bellori; Ponte Basaginocchi; Vajo dell'Anguilla	Imprints	A red alga of the family Solenoporaceae	Example of Solenopora specimens agreggation
Schizosporis	S. cf. reticulatus; S. sp.	Bellori; Ponte Basaginocchi; Vajo dell'Anguilla; Pedescala-Castelletto; Ferrazza-Campodalbero; Dazio-Chiesa-Zaffoni-Rovereto; Buse-Nosellari-Dazio-Carbonare; Virti-Osteria; Boccaldo-Pozza; Leno di Terragnolo	Cysts	Affinities with the extant genus Spirogyra (Zygnemataceae)	Extant Spirogyra
Thaumatoporella	T. parvovesiculifera	Bellori; Ponte Basaginocchi; Vajo dell'Anguilla; Pedescala-Castelletto; Ferrazza-Campodalbero; Dazio-Chiesa-Zaffoni-Rovereto; Buse-Nosellari-Dazio-Carbonare; Virti-Osteria; Boccaldo-Pozza; Leno di Terragnolo	Imprints	A green alga of the Thaumatoporellales group. The dominant alga locally	

==== Equisetales ====
Genus/Family	Species	Provenance	Material	Notes	Images
Calamospora	C. sp	Bellori; Ponte Basaginocchi; Vajo dell'Anguilla	Spores	Affinities with the Calamitaceae.	
Equisetites	E. bunburyanus; E. veronensis; E. minor; E. spp.	Roverè di Velo; Campo Fontana; Val d´Assa; Pernigotti; RPC section, Coe Pass	Stems	Affinities with Equisetaceae.	
Phyllotheca	P. brongniartiana; P. equisetiformis	Roverè di Velo	Leaf Whorl	Affinities with Phyllothecaceae.	Phyllotheca brongniartiana from the Rotzo Formation

==== Lycophytes ====
Genus/Family	Species	Provenance	Material	Notes	Images
Aratrisporites	A. sp	Bellori; Ponte Basaginocchi; Vajo dell'Anguilla	Spores	Affinities with Lycopodiaceae.	
Camarozonosporites	C. cf. heskemensis	Bellori; Ponte Basaginocchi; Vajo dell'Anguilla; Pedescala-Castelletto; Ferrazza-Campodalbero; Dazio-Chiesa-Zaffoni-Rovereto; Buse-Nosellari-Dazio-Carbonare; Virti-Osteria; Boccaldo-Pozza; Leno di Terragnolo	Spores	Affinities with Lycopodiaceae.	
Cabochonicus	cf. C. carbunculus	Bellori; Ponte Basaginocchi; Vajo dell'Anguilla	Spores	Affinities with Selaginellaceae	
Densosporites	D. fissus; D. sp.	Bellori; Ponte Basaginocchi; Vajo dell'Anguilla; Pedescala-Castelletto; Ferrazza-Campodalbero; Dazio-Chiesa-Zaffoni-Rovereto; Buse-Nosellari-Dazio-Carbonare; Virti-Osteria; Boccaldo-Pozza; Leno di Terragnolo	Spores	Affinities with Selaginellaceae	
Foveosporites	F. visscheri; F. sp.	Bellori; Ponte Basaginocchi; Vajo dell'Anguilla; Pedescala-Castelletto; Ferrazza-Campodalbero; Dazio-Chiesa-Zaffoni-Rovereto; Buse-Nosellari-Dazio-Carbonare; Virti-Osteria; Boccaldo-Pozza; Leno di Terragnolo	Spores.	Affinities with Selaginellaceae	
Horstisporites	H. harrisii	Bellori; Ponte Basaginocchi; Vajo dell'Anguilla	Spores	Affinities with Selaginellaceae	
Hughesisporites	cf. H. orlowskae	Bellori; Ponte Basaginocchi; Vajo dell'Anguilla	Spores	Affinities with Selaginellaceae	
Leptolepidites	L. cf. major; L. sp.	Bellori; Ponte Basaginocchi; Vajo dell'Anguilla; Pedescala-Castelletto; Ferrazza-Campodalbero; Dazio-Chiesa-Zaffoni-Rovereto; Buse-Nosellari-Dazio-Carbonare; Virti-Osteria; Boccaldo-Pozza; Leno di Terragnolo	Spores	Affinities with Lycopodiaceae.	
Limbosporites	L. sp.	Bellori; Ponte Basaginocchi; Vajo dell'Anguilla	Spores	Affinities with Lycopodiaceae.	
Lycopodiumsporites	L. semimuris; L. sp.	Bellori; Ponte Basaginocchi; Vajo dell'Anguilla; Pedescala-Castelletto; Ferrazza-Campodalbero; Dazio-Chiesa-Zaffoni-Rovereto; Buse-Nosellari-Dazio-Carbonare; Virti-Osteria; Boccaldo-Pozza; Leno di Terragnolo	Spores	Affinities with Lycopodiaceae.	
Retitriletes	R. semimuris	Bellori; Ponte Basaginocchi; Vajo dell'Anguilla; Pedescala-Castelletto; Ferrazza-Campodalbero; Dazio-Chiesa-Zaffoni-Rovereto; Buse-Nosellari-Dazio-Carbonare; Virti-Osteria; Boccaldo-Pozza; Leno di Terragnolo	Spores	Affinities with Lycopodiaceae.	
Retusotriletes	R. sp.	Bellori; Ponte Basaginocchi; Vajo dell'Anguilla; Pedescala-Castelletto; Ferrazza-Campodalbero; Dazio-Chiesa-Zaffoni-Rovereto; Buse-Nosellari-Dazio-Carbonare; Virti-Osteria; Boccaldo-Pozza; Leno di Terragnolo	Spores	Affinities with Lycopodiaceae.	
Trileites	cf. T. murrayi	Bellori; Ponte Basaginocchi; Vajo dell'Anguilla	Spores	Affinities with Selaginellaceae	

==== Pteridophytes ====
Genus/Family	Species	Provenance	Material	Notes	Images
Accincitisporites	A. sp.	Bellori; Ponte Basaginocchi; Vajo dell'Anguilla	Spores	Incertae sedis; affinities with the Pteridophyta	
Auritulinasporites	A. scanicus	Bellori; Ponte Basaginocchi; Vajo dell'Anguilla; Pedescala-Castelletto; Ferrazza-Campodalbero; Dazio-Chiesa-Zaffoni-Rovereto; Buse-Nosellari-Dazio-Carbonare; Virti-Osteria; Boccaldo-Pozza; Leno di Terragnolo	Spores	Incertae sedis; affinities with the Pteridophyta	
Baculatisporites	B. comaumensis; B. sp	Bellori; Ponte Basaginocchi; Vajo dell'Anguilla; Pedescala-Castelletto; Ferrazza-Campodalbero; Dazio-Chiesa-Zaffoni-Rovereto; Buse-Nosellari-Dazio-Carbonare; Virti-Osteria; Boccaldo-Pozza; Leno di Terragnolo	Spores	Affinities with the family Osmundaceae.	
Concavisporites	C. crassexinius; C. sp. A; C. sp. B; C. sp. C	Bellori; Ponte Basaginocchi; Vajo dell'Anguilla; Pedescala-Castelletto; Ferrazza-Campodalbero; Dazio-Chiesa-Zaffoni-Rovereto; Buse-Nosellari-Dazio-Carbonare; Virti-Osteria; Boccaldo-Pozza; Leno di Terragnolo	Spores	Incertae sedis; affinities with the Pteridophyta	
Coniopteris	C. hymenophylloides	Rotzo	Fronds	Affinities with Polypodiales.	
Danaeites	D. heeri; D. brongniartiana	Rotzo; Val d´Assa; Bienterle; Selva di Progno	Fronds	Affinities with Marattiales.	
Deltoidospora	D. minor; D. toralis; D. sp.	Bellori; Ponte Basaginocchi; Vajo dell'Anguilla; Pedescala-Castelletto; Ferrazza-Campodalbero; Dazio-Chiesa-Zaffoni-Rovereto; Buse-Nosellari-Dazio-Carbonare; Virti-Osteria; Boccaldo-Pozza; Leno di Terragnolo	Spores	Incertae sedis; affinities with the Pteridophyta	
Dictyophyllum	D. sp.	Roverè di Velo	Fronds	Affinities with Dipteridaceae.	
Gleichenites	G. elegans	Roverè di Velo	Fronds	Affinities with Gleicheniaceae.	
Hymenophyllites	H. leckenbyi	Roverè di Velo	Fronds	Affinities with either Dicksoniaceae or Polypodiidae. Similar to the genus Coniopteris.	
Ischyosporites	I. variegatus; I. sp.	Bellori; Ponte Basaginocchi; Vajo dell'Anguilla; Pedescala-Castelletto; Ferrazza-Campodalbero; Dazio-Chiesa-Zaffoni-Rovereto; Buse-Nosellari-Dazio-Carbonare; Virti-Osteria; Boccaldo-Pozza; Leno di Terragnolo	Spores	Incertae sedis; affinities with the Pteridophyta	
Laccopteris	L. rotzana	Rotzo	Fronds	Affinities with Matoniaceae.	
Lycopodiacidites	L. cerebriformis; L. regulatus; L. sp.	Bellori; Ponte Basaginocchi; Vajo dell'Anguilla; Pedescala-Castelletto; Ferrazza-Campodalbero; Dazio-Chiesa-Zaffoni-Rovereto; Buse-Nosellari-Dazio-Carbonare; Virti-Osteria; Boccaldo-Pozza; Leno di Terragnolo	Spores	Affinities with the Ophioglossaceae.	
Marzaria	M. paroliniana	Roverè di Velo	Fronds	Affinities with Matoniaceae.	Marzaria paroliniana from the Rotzo Formation
Matonidium	M. rotzoana	Roverè di Velo	Fronds	Affinities with Matoniaceae.	
Phlebopteris	P. polypodioides	Val d´Assa	Fronds	Affinities with Matoniaceae.	
Protorhipis	P. asarifolia	Roverè di Velo	Fronds	Affinities with Dipteridaceae. A rather lower Fern, with great resemblance with the modern genus Dipteris.	
Skarbysporites	S. puntii; S. elsendoornii; S. sp.	Bellori; Ponte Basaginocchi; Vajo dell'Anguilla; Pedescala-Castelletto; Ferrazza-Campodalbero; Dazio-Chiesa-Zaffoni-Rovereto; Buse-Nosellari-Dazio-Carbonare; Virti-Osteria; Boccaldo-Pozza; Leno di Terragnolo	Spores	Incertae sedis; affinities with the Pteridophyta	
Tigrisporites	T. jonkeri; T. sp.	Bellori; Ponte Basaginocchi; Vajo dell'Anguilla; Pedescala-Castelletto; Ferrazza-Campodalbero; Dazio-Chiesa-Zaffoni-Rovereto; Buse-Nosellari-Dazio-Carbonare; Virti-Osteria; Boccaldo-Pozza; Leno di Terragnolo	Spores	Incertae sedis; affinities with the Pteridophyta	
Todisporites	T. minor; T. cinctus; T. sp.	Bellori; Ponte Basaginocchi; Vajo dell'Anguilla; Pedescala-Castelletto; Ferrazza-Campodalbero; Dazio-Chiesa-Zaffoni-Rovereto; Buse-Nosellari-Dazio-Carbonare; Virti-Osteria; Boccaldo-Pozza; Leno di Terragnolo	Spores	Affinities with the family Osmundaceae.	
Trachysporites	T. fuscus	Bellori; Ponte Basaginocchi; Vajo dell'Anguilla; Pedescala-Castelletto; Ferrazza-Campodalbero; Dazio-Chiesa-Zaffoni-Rovereto; Buse-Nosellari-Dazio-Carbonare; Virti-Osteria; Boccaldo-Pozza; Leno di Terragnolo	Spores	Incertae sedis; affinities with the Pteridophyta	
Verrutriletes	cf.V. compostipunctatus	Bellori; Ponte Basaginocchi; Vajo dell'Anguilla	Spores	Incertae sedis; affinities with the Pteridophyta	

==== Corystospermales ====
Genus/Family	Species	Provenance	Material	Notes	Images
Alisporites	A. sp.	Bellori; Ponte Basaginocchi; Vajo dell'Anguilla	Spores	Affinities with Corystospermales and Peltaspermales	
Cycadopteris	C. brauniana; C. heerii; C. heterophylla	Valle Zuliani; Rotzo; Roverè di Velo; Albaredo	Fronds	Affinities with Corystospermaceae. On the Roverè di Velo collection, C. brauniana is the most common Frond found.	Cycadopteris brauniana and Cycadopteris sp., both recovered from different locations of the Rotzo Formation
"Cyclopteris"	"C." minor	St. Bortolomeo	Fronds	Affinities with Corystospermaceae.	
Dichopteris	D. rhomboidalis; D. paroliniana; D. angustifolia; D. visianica; D. micophylla	Roverè di Velo; Val d´Assa; Val Juliani; Val Salorno	Fronds	Affinities with Corystospermaceae. Represents the largest "Seed Fern" Leaf in the fossil record, with leaves up to 70 cm, having an habit resembling the extant angiosperm Nypa fruticans.	Dichopteris visianica from the Rotzo Formation

==== Caytoniales ====
Genus/Family	Species	Provenance	Material	Notes	Images
Pseudosagenopteris	P. angustifolia	Roverè di Velo	Leaflets	Affinities with Caytoniaceae.	
Sagenopteris	S. reniformis; S. goeppertiana; S. nilssoniana	Roverè di Velo	Leaflets	Affinities with Caytoniaceae.	Sagenopteris nilssoniana from the Rotzo Formation
Vitreisporites	V. pallidus	Bellori; Ponte Basaginocchi; Vajo dell'Anguilla; Pedescala-Castelletto; Ferrazza-Campodalbero; Dazio-Chiesa-Zaffoni-Rovereto; Buse-Nosellari-Dazio-Carbonare; Virti-Osteria; Boccaldo-Pozza; Leno di Terragnolo	Pollen	Affinities with the family Caytoniaceae.	

==== Erdtmanithecales ====
Genus/Family	Species	Provenance	Material	Notes	Images
Eucommiidites	E. troedssoni	Bellori; Ponte Basaginocchi; Vajo dell'Anguilla	Pollen	Type pollen of the Erdtmanithecales, related to the Gnetales.	

==== Cycadophyta ====
Genus/Family	Species	Provenance	Material	Notes	Images
Androstrobus	A. ssp.	Roverè di Velo; Rotzo	Reproductive structure	Incertade sedis inside Cycadophyta.	
Apoldia	A. tenera	Apolda; Roverè di Velo; Rotzo	Leaflets	Incertade sedis inside Cycadophyta.	
Chasmatosporites	C. sp	Bellori; Ponte Basaginocchi; Vajo dell'Anguilla	Pollen	Affinities with the family Zamiaceae. Was found to be similar to the pollen of the extant Encephalartos laevifolius.	
Cycadopites	C. sp.	Bellori; Ponte Basaginocchi; Vajo dell'Anguilla; Pedescala-Castelletto; Ferrazza-Campodalbero; Dazio-Chiesa-Zaffoni-Rovereto; Buse-Nosellari-Dazio-Carbonare; Virti-Osteria; Boccaldo-Pozza; Leno di Terragnolo	Pollen	Affinities with the family Cycadaceae.	
Cycadospadix	C spp.	Roverè di Velo; Rotzo	Reproductive structure	Incertade sedis inside Bennettitales or Cycadophyta	
Taeniopteris	T. sp.	Valgola/Val Gola area	Leaves	Affinities with either Cycadales, Bennettitales or Pentoxylales. Suggested habit similar to that of brambles	

==== Bennettitales ====
Genus/Family	Species	Provenance	Material	Notes	Images
Blastolepis	B. otozamitis; B. acuminata	Roverè di Velo; Rotzo	Reproductive structure	Incertade sedis inside Bennettitales.	
Cycadeospermum	C spp.	Roverè di Velo; Rotzo	Reproductive structure	Incertade sedis inside Bennettitales or Cycadophyta	
Deltolepis	D. mitra	Rotzo	Reproductive structure	Incertade sedis inside Bennettitales or Cycadophyta	
Lomatopteris	L. jurensis	Roverè di Velo	Fronds	Incertade sedis inside Bennettitales.	Lomatopteris jurensis from the Rotzo Formation
Otozamites	O. bunburyanus; O. veronensis; O. vicentinus; O. mattiellianus; O. nathorstii; O. feistmantelii; O. molinianus; O. massalongianus; O. spp.	Roverè di Velo; Rotzo; Val d´Assa; M. Pernigotti; S. Bortolomeo	Pinnate leaf fragments	Affinities with Williamsoniaceae. Otozamites is among the most abundant flora genus recovered on some of the levels.	Otozamites bunburyanus from the Rotzo Formation
Pterophyllum	P. venetum; P. platyrachis	Roverè di Velo; Rotzo; Vall d´Assa; M. pernigotti; Scandolara	Leaflets	Affinities with Williamsoniaceae.	
Ptilophyllum	P. grandifolium; P. triangulare; P. spp.	Roverè di Velo	Leaves	Affinities with Williamsoniaceae. Was previously ascribed to Pachypteris visianica and Cycadopteris brauniana.	Ptilophyllum grandifolium from the Rotzo Formation
Sphenozamites	S. rossii; S. geylerianus; S. spp.	Rotzo; Roverè di Velo	Leaflets	Affinities with Williamsoniaceae.	
Weltrichia	W. oolithica; W. sp.	Roverè di Velo; Selva di Progno	Bennettite "Flower"	Affinities with Williamsoniaceae.	
Wielandiella	W. angustifolia	Roverè di Velo	'strobilus'	Affinities with Williamsoniaceae.	
Williamsonia	W. italica	Monte raut; Roverè di Velo	Bennettite "Flower"	Affinities with Williamsoniaceae.	Williamsonia italica from the Rotzo Formation
Zamites	Z. goepperti; Z. ribeiroanus; Z. rotzoanus	Rotzo; M. pernigotti; S. Bortolomeo	Leaflets	Incertade sedis inside Bennettitales.	

==== Ginkgoopsida ====
Genus/Family	Species	Provenance	Material	Notes	Images
Monosulcites	M. sp.	Bellori; Ponte Basaginocchi; Vajo dell'Anguilla	Pollen	Affinities with the family Karkeniaceae and Ginkgoaceae.	
Trevisania	T. furcellata	Val d´Assa	Leaves	Affinities with the genus Trichopitys, as probably a member of Karkeniaceae, with strong resemblance with the genus Baiera, lumped in some papers as Baiera lindleyana.	Baiera a taxon that has been said to include Trevisania

==== Conifers ====
Genus/Family	Species	Provenance	Material	Notes	Images
Brachyphyllum	B. tropidimorphyrn; B. graciliforme; B. kendallianum; B. appropinquatum; B. praetermissum	Roverè di Velo; Pernigotti; Boca di Trappola; Rotzo; Valle Zulliani	Branched shoots; Isolated leaves	Affinities with Araucariaceae or Cheirolepidiaceae. Brachyphyllum tropidimorphyrn shows close resemblance between African and Venetian conifers and its distribution suggests a lowland araucarian forest.	Brachyphyllum kendallianum from the Rotzo Formation
Classopollis	C. sp; C. classoides; C. meyeriana; C. torosus	Bellori; Ponte Basaginocchi; Vajo dell'Anguilla; Pedescala-Castelletto; Ferrazza-Campodalbero; Dazio-Chiesa-Zaffoni-Rovereto; Buse-Nosellari-Dazio-Carbonare; Virti-Osteria; Boccaldo-Pozza; Leno di Terragnolo	Pollen	Affinities with the Hirmeriellaceae.	
Dactylethrophyllum	D. peristictum	Scandolara	Branched shoots	Affinities with the Hirmeriellaceae.	
Desmiophyllum	D. zeillerianum; D. rigidum	Pernigotti; Roverè di Velo; Valle Zuliani	Isolated leaves	A possible Conifer leaf. Was suggested to have affinities with Czekanowskiales, sometimes found inside Ginkgoopsida, yet recent finds of it associated with the cone genera Sphaerostrobus and Ourostrobus points to a coniferophyte affinity, maybe as a member of Palissyaceae.	
Elatocladus	E. zignoi; E. veronensis; cf. E. sp.	Roverè di Velo; Val d´Assa; Rotzo	Branched shoots	Affinities with Cupressaceae. Arboreal plants similar to the modern genus Cunninghamia.	Elatocladus zignoi from the Rotzo Formation
Granuloperculatipollis	G. sp.	Bellori; Ponte Basaginocchi; Vajo dell'Anguilla	Pollen	Affinities with the Hirmeriellaceae.	
Pagiophyllum	P. rotzoanum; P. vicentinum; P. veronense; P. magnipapillare; P. valdassense; P. robustum; P. revoltinum	Roverè di Velo; Val d´Assa; Rotzo; Pernigotti; Monte Carpani	Isolated Leaves; Branched Shoots; Cuticles	Affinities with Araucariaceae or Cheirolepidiaceae. One of the specimens was assigned to Otozamites massalongianus.	Pagiophyllum rotzoanum from the Rotzo Formation
Pelourdea	P. megaphylla	Roverè di Velo; Val d´Assa; Rotzo; Scandolara; Squaranton; Bienterle	Isolated Leaves; Pollen Organ	Incertae sedis inside Coniferales, initially identified as "Yuccites schimperianus", suggested as a member of its own family, the "Pelourdeaceae". A hygrophytic riparian conifer with herbaceous or shrubby habit.	
Perinopollenites	P. sp.	Bellori; Ponte Basaginocchi; Vajo dell'Anguilla	Pollen	Affinities with the family Cupressaceae.	
Pinuspollenites	P. sp.	Bellori; Ponte Basaginocchi; Vajo dell'Anguilla	Pollen	Affinities with the family Pinaceae.	
Pityophyllum	P. crassicostatum	Pernigotti	Isolated leaves	Affinities with Schizolepisaceae in the Pinaceae.	
Spheripollenites	S. sp.	Bellori; Ponte Basaginocchi; Vajo dell'Anguilla	Pollen	Affinities with the Hirmeriellaceae.	
Stachyotaxus	S. spp.	Valle Zuliani; Roverè di Velo	Branched shoots	Affinities with Palyssiaceae. Extinct group conifer leaves with similarities with Sequoia or Amentotaxus. Maybe Includes the species "Taxites vicentina".	"Taxites vicentina"
