= Calcari Grigi Group =

Geological formation in Italy

- Stratigraphic range: Hettangian-Pliensbachian; ~201–185.99 Ma
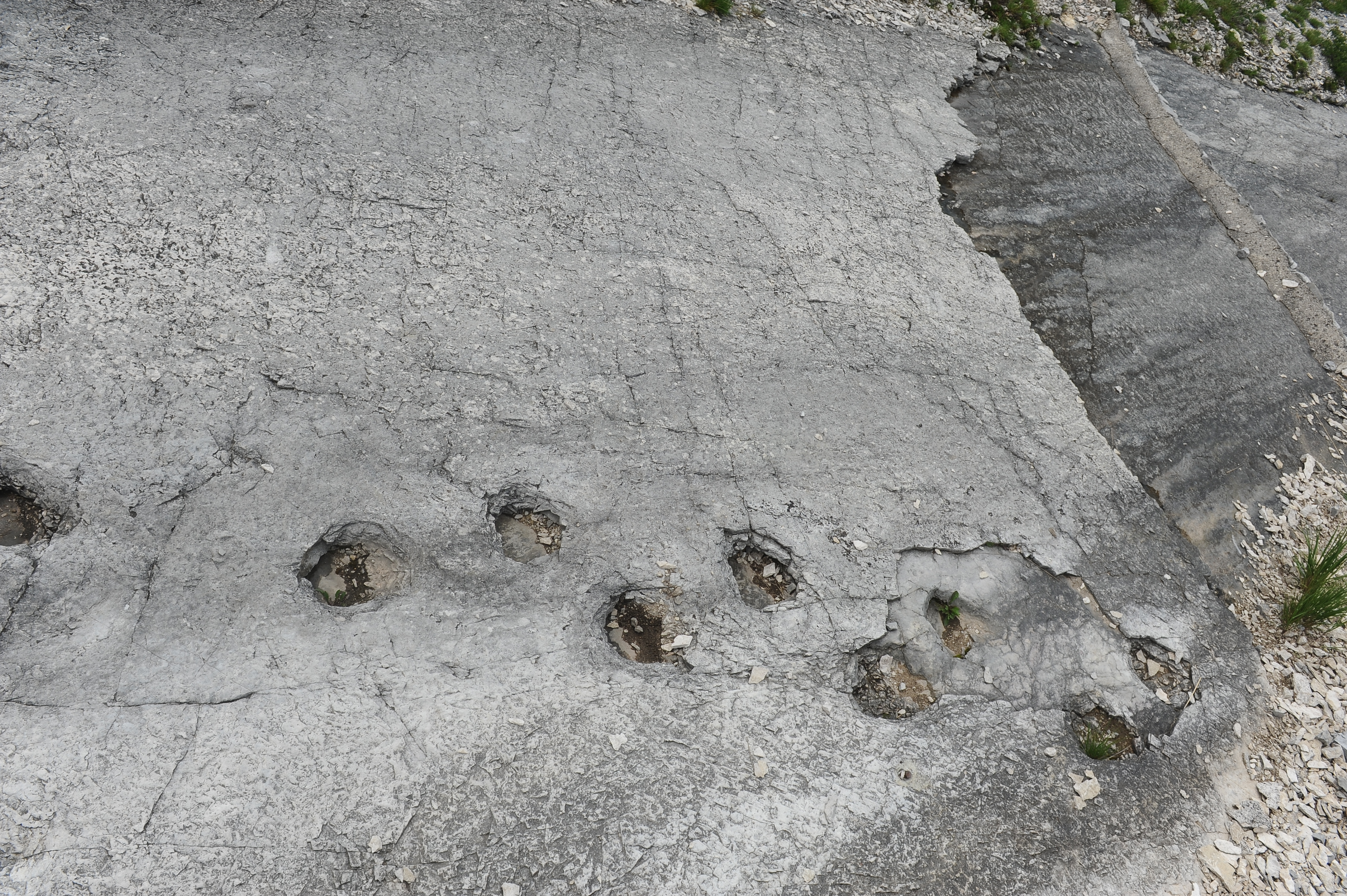
- Outcrop with dinosaur tracks at Lavini di Marco
- Type: Geological formation
- Sub-units: Loppio Oolitic Limestone; Monte Zugna Formation; Rotzo Formation
- Area: Trento

Location
- Country: Italy

The Calcari Grigi di Group is a geological group in Italy, dating to roughly between 200 and 190 million years ago and covering the Hettangian to Pliensbachian stages of the Jurassic System. Fossil prosauropod tracks have been reported in the formation. It represented a carbonate platform, being located over the Trento Platform and surrounded by the Tofino Formation (deep-water), Massone Oolite (marginal calcarenitic bodies), the Fanes Piccola Encrinite (condensed deposits and emerged lands), the Lombadian Basin Medolo Group and Belluno Basin Soverzene Formation (open marine), and finally towards the south, deep water deposits of the Adriatic Basin. This formation was deposited within a tropical lagoon environment, similar to modern Bahamas which was protected by oolitic shoals and bars from the open deep sea located to the east (Belluno Basin) and towards the west (Lombardia Basin).

The sedimentary cover of the Southern Alps has been recognized as a well-preserved section of the Mesozoic Tethys' southern continental margin, featuring a horst and graben structure linked to the rifting associated with the opening of the central North Atlantic that in the Late Triassic and Early Jurassic, created elevated blocks separated by troughs. While the western margin (Piedmont and Lombardy) quickly submerged in the Early Jurassic (As seen by the Moltrasio Formation), the eastern regions maintained shallow water sedimentation, including the Friuli and Trento Platforms, this last one latter evolving into a pelagic plateau, and separated from the Lombardian basin by the Garda escarpment fault system.

== Subunits ==
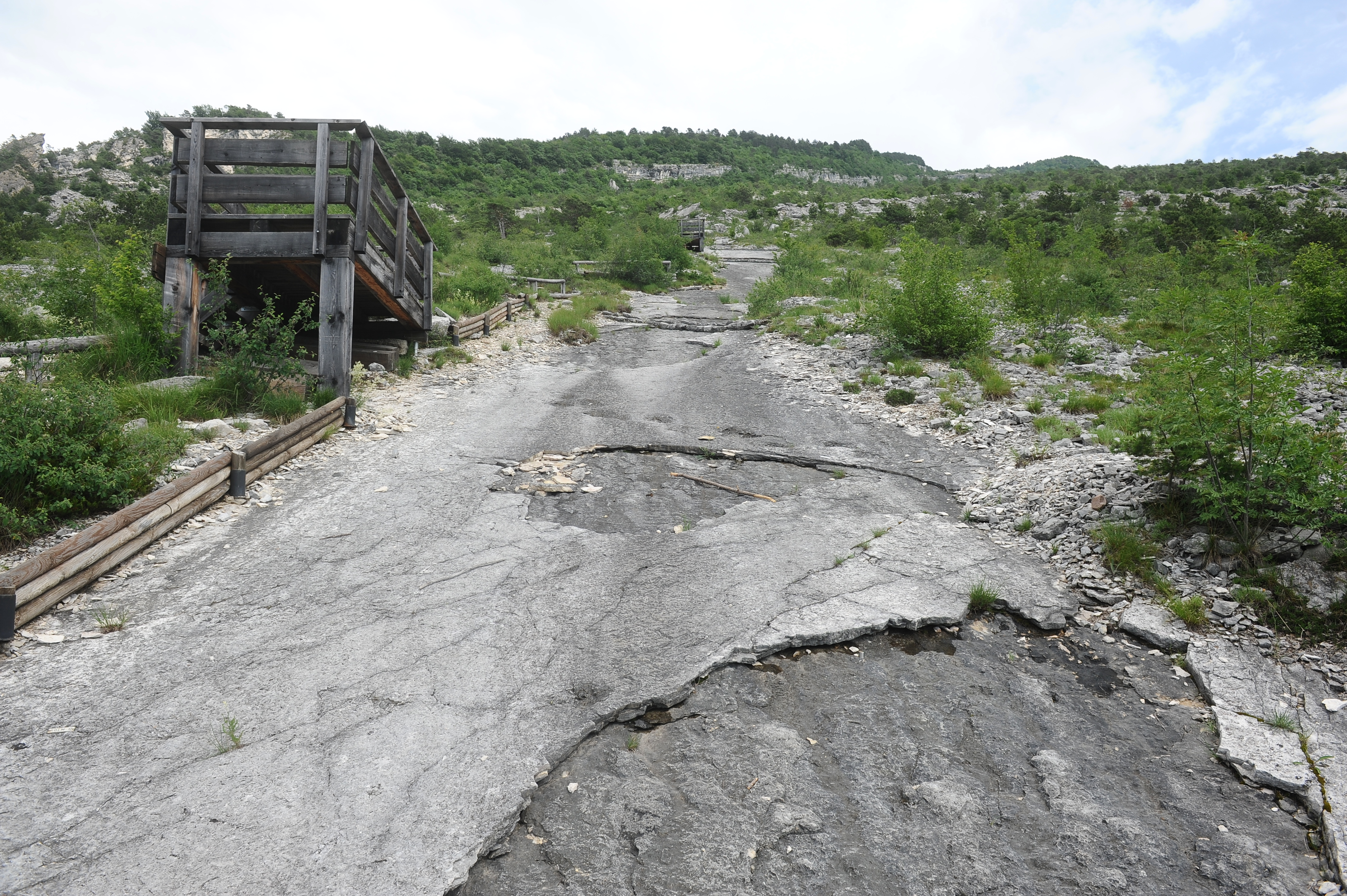
Panoramic of Lavini di Marco

=== Monte Zugna Formation (Hettangian–upper Sinemurian) ===
This formation consists of shallow-water carbonate deposits, several hundred metres thick, organised in metre-scale shallowing-upward cycles. It includes three main informal units: a lower cyclic subtidal unit (bioturbated micritic to bioclastic limestones with green clay interbeds), a middle peritidal unit (alternating stromatolitic bindstones, peloidal mudstones, bioclastic wackestones, and reddish mudstones with mud cracks, teepees, and pedogenic features), and an upper subtidal unit (nodular mudstone-wackestones with increasing grainy intercalations). It was deposited on a broad peritidal to shallow subtidal platform in a warm, tropical shallow sea. The middle peritidal unit records tidal-flat conditions with microbial mats, periodic subaerial exposure, dinosaur tracks and freshwater influence (evidenced by stable isotopes and karst-like features). This surfaces are of less extent than the Latest Triassic local counterparts, maybe as result of size change of the exposed landmasses. Overall arid to semi-arid climate with occasional humid pulses.

=== Loppio Oolitic Limestone (upper Sinemurian) ===
A prominent, poorly bedded to massive oolitic grainstone unit, up to tens of metres thick, composed mainly of ooids with minor intraclasts and bioclasts, cemented by sparry calcite. It shows progradational geometry and transitions upward from the Monte Zugna Formation. High-energy shallow subtidal shoals and ooid bars on the carbonate platform during a phase of increased carbonate production and relative sea-level stability/highstand. It represents a shift to more open-marine, agitated conditions compared to the underlying peritidal facies. Syn-sedimentary faulting affected this rigid, early-cemented unit, creating extensional structures later sealed by overlying deposits. Locally the so called "Arnioceras time Event", and to a larger extent the Sinemurian-Pliensbachian Event, analogue to the Carnian pluvial episode is seen.

== Biota ==
The richest assamblage of the group is the Rotzo Formation.

Color key: Taxon / Reclassified taxon / Taxon falsely reported as present / Dubious taxon or junior synonym / Ichnotaxon / Ootaxon / Morphotaxon	Notes; Uncertain or tentative taxa are in small text; ~~crossed out~~ taxa are discredited.

=== Foraminifera ===
Genus/Family	Species	Provenance	Material	Notes	Images
Aeolisaccus	A. dunningtoni	Monte Cumieli	Isolated Tests/Shells	A foraminifer of the Earlandiidae family	
Everticyclammina	E. praevirguliana	Foza section; Monte Cumieli	Isolated Tests/Shells	A foraminifer of the Everticyclamminidae family.	
Meandrovoluta	M. asiagoensis	Monte Cumieli	Isolated Tests/Shells	A foraminifer of the Cornuspiridae family	
Mayncina	M. (Paleomayncina) termieri	Chizzola section; Foza section; Monte Cumieli	Isolated Tests/Shells	A foraminifer of the Mayncinidae family	
Rectocyclammina	R. spp.	Monte Cumieli	Isolated Tests/Shells	A foraminifer of the Everticyclamminidae family.	
Siphovalvulina	S. spp.	Monte Cumieli	Isolated Tests/Shells	Shallow-subtidal benthic foraminifera of Siphovalvulinidae	

=== Invertebrates ===
Indeterminate Ostracod, Gastropod and Echinoderm material is known in the Lavini di Marco ichnosite.

Genus/Family	Species	Provenance	Material	Notes	Images
Aulichnites	cf. A. isp.	Lavini di Marco	Locomotion/feeding traces	Gastropod traces, Present on subtidal beds.	
Gervillioperna	G. buchi	Chizzola section; Foza section; Lavini di Marco; Monte Cumieli	Shells	Plicatostylidae oyster	
Favreina	F. sp.	Foza section	Coprolites	Decapod coprolites	
Pisirhynchia	P. uhligi	Lavini di Marco	Shells	Norellidae brachiopod	
Rhizocorallium	cf. R. isp.	Lavini di Marco	Burrows / traces	Part of a moderately diversified assemblage.	
"Terebratula"	''T.'' ''dubiosa''	Lavini di Marco	Shells	Terebratulida brachiopod	
Thalassinoides	T. isp.	Lavini di Marco	Burrows	Decapod? convex structures at the base of subtidal beds; also in inter-supratidal interval.	
Zoophycos	Z. isp.	Lavini di Marco	Traces	Present in the inter-supratidal bed-set.	

=== Non-Dinosaur ===
Genus/Family	Species	Provenance	Material	Notes	Images
Brasilichnium?	B.? isp.	Lavini di Marco	Footprints	Synapsid track reported at the site	Done by small taxa such as Morganucodon
Crocodylomorpha indet.	Indeterminate	Lavini di Marco	Footprints	Small terrestrial taxon	Done by small taxa such as Dibothrosuchus
Lepidosauria indet.	Indeterminate	Lavini di Marco	Footprints	"Lizard-like" trackmaker	Done by small taxa such as Planocephalosaurus

=== Dinosaurs ===
Genus/Family	Species	Provenance	Material	Notes	Images
Anchisauripus	A. ispp.	Lavini di Marco	Footprints	Small theropod tracks	Anchisauripus may belong to a genus similar to Coelophysis
Anomoepus	A. isp.	Lavini di Marco	Footprints	Primitive ornithischian tracks; some indicate sitting posture.	"Stormbergia"´s feet matches with the Anomoepus tracks
Ceratosauria? indet.	Indeterminate	Lavini di Marco	Footprints	Referred to the coeval genus Saltriovenator.	Saltriovenator
Eubrontes	E. ispp.	Lavini di Marco; Chizzola; Pizzo di Levico; Monte Pasubio, Becco di Filadonna	Footprints	Medium to large-sized theropod tracks; common in Upper Subtidal Unit.	
Grallator	G. ispp.	Lavini di Marco; Monte Pelmo; other Monte Zugna sites	Footprints	Small tridactyl theropod tracks.	Grallator may belong to a genus similar to Dracoraptor
Kayentapus	K. hopii; K. soltykovensis; K. minor; K. isp.	Lavini di Marco; Chizzola; Pizzo di Levico; Monte Pelmo	Footprints	Most abundant theropod ichnotaxon in Middle Peritidal Unit; Dilophosaur-like trackmakers.	Kayentapus may belong to a genus similar to Sarcosaurus
Lavinipes	L. cheminii	Lavini di Marco	Footprints	Basal Gongxianosaurus-like sauropod.	
Ornithischia indet. (Iguanodontidae-like)	Indeterminate	Lavini di Marco; other Monte Zugna sites	Footprints	Very deep tridactyl bipedal footprints similar to later iguanodontids; possibly large graviportal forms.	
Parabrontopodus/Breviparopus-like	Indeterminate	Lavini di Marco; Becco di Filadonna; Monte Pasubio	Footprints	Narrow-gauge quadrupedal sauropodomorph tracks; pear-shaped pes, kidney/horseshoe-shaped manus. Larger forms in Upper Subtidal Unit.	Local sauropod tracks resemble the feet of the genus Vulcanodon
Sauropodomorpha indet.	Indeterminate	Lavini di Marco; Monte Pasubio (Dente Italiano/Cima Palon); Becco di Filadonna; Monte Finonchio; Malga Buse Bisorte	Footprints	Medium to large sauropodomorphs; sub-circular underprints with raised rims at Monte Pasubio.	
Theropoda indet.	Indeterminate (Panguraptor-like and Sinosaurus-like pes)	Lavini di Marco; Sega di Ala; Monte Pelmo; Chizzola	Footprints	Most abundant dinosaur group across megasites.	

=== Flora ===
Genus/Family	Species	Provenance	Material	Notes	Images
Aratrisporites	A. minor	Chizzola section	Spores	Affinities with Isoetaceae.	Extant Isoetes.
Cayeuxia	C. spp.	Monte Cumieli	Imprints	Maybe Bryopsidales.	
Cerebropollenites	C. thiergartii	Chizzola section	Pollen	Aff. Sciadopityaceae conifer	Extant Sciadopitys.
Chasmatosporites	C. sp	Chizzola section	Pollen	Affinities with the family Zamiaceae.	Extant Encephalartos
Classopollis	C. spp.	Lavini di Marco	Pollen	Cheirolepidiaceae Conifer, dominant palynomorph	
Eodasycladus	E. spp.	Foza section	Imprints	A green alga of the family Dasycladaceae.	
Eucommiidites	E. troedssoni	Chizzola section	Pollen	Type pollen of the Erdtmanithecales, related to the Gnetales.	
Fanesella	F. dolomitica	Foza section	Imprints	A green alga of the family Dasycladaceae.	
Linoporella	L. spp.	Foza section	Imprints	A green alga of the family Dasycladaceae.	
Palaeodasycladus	P. mediterraneus; P. gracilis; P. spp.	Foza section; Lavini di Marco; Monte Cumieli	Imprints	A green alga of the family Dasycladaceae. A reefal algae usually found in carbonate settings along all the Mediterranean	P. mediterraneus specimens
Porcellispora	P. longdonensis	Lavini di Marco	Spores	Affinities with Bryophyta or Marchantiophyta, potentially Riellaceae.	
Retitriletes	R. clavatoides	Chizzola section	Spores	Aff. Lycopodiaceae	Extant Lycopodium.
Sestrosphaera	S. liasina	Monte Cumieli	Imprints	A green alga of the family Triploporellaceae.	
Terquemella	T. spp.	Foza section	Imprints	A green alga of the family Dasycladaceae.	
Tersella	T. genotii; T. alpina	Monte Cumieli	Imprints	A green alga of the family Dasycladaceae.	
Thaumatoporella	T. parvovesiculifera; T. spp.	Lavini di Marco; Monte Cumieli	Imprints	A green alga of the Thaumatoporellales group. The dominant alga locally	

== See also ==
- List of dinosaur-bearing rock formations
- Rotzo Formation
  - List of stratigraphic units with sauropodomorph tracks
    - Prosauropod tracks
