= Seoca Lithiotis Limestone =

Geological formation in Montenegro

- Stratigraphic range: Late Pliensbachian-Lower Toarcian; ~185–183 Ma
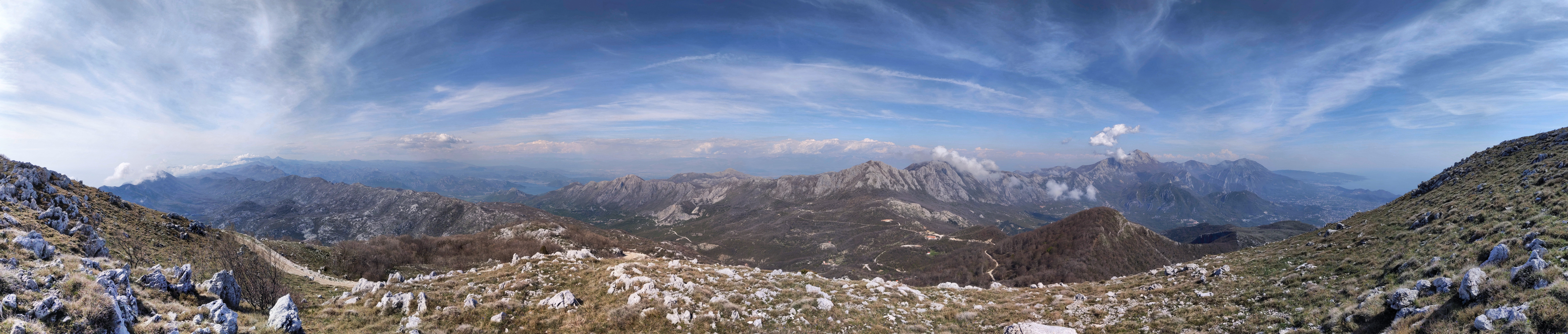
- Rumija, where the southernmost Seoca Lithiotis Limestone emerges
- Type: Geological formation
- Unit of: Adriatic–Dinaric Carbonate Platform
- Sub-units: Unnamed shoaling-upward meter-scale cycles
- Underlies: Oolites of Mount Rumija II
- Overlies: Late Triassic Lofer limestones
- Thickness: ~450 m (1,480 ft)

Lithology
- Primary: Limestone (bioclastic wackestone/packstone, fenestral pelmicrite)
- Other: Oncoid–peloid grainstone; lumachelle beds rich in Lithiotis

Location
- Coordinates: 42°59′30″N 18°54′20″E
- Region: Nikšić to Lake Skadar margin (Seoca–Golik–Maručići)
- Country: Montenegro, Albania?
- Extent: Mostly NE slopes of Mt. Rumija across Seoca and Golik to Maručići, outcrops in isolated patches towards Nikšić

Type section
- Named for: Seoca (Румија/Rumija area)
- Named by: Čađenović, Radulović, Ostojić & Milutin
- Year defined: 2005
- Seoca Lithiotis Limestone (Montenegro)

The Seoca Lithiotis Limestone ("Budoš Mountain Limestone", also known simply as High Karst Bioclastic limestone) is a geological formation in Montenegro and possibly Albania that dates to 185–183 million years ago, covering the Pliensbachian–Toarcian stage of the Jurassic Period. It is located within the high karst zone and represents a unique terrestrial setting with abundant plant material, one of the few known from the Toarcian of Europe. It is the regional equivalent to the Toarcian–Aalenian units of Spain (such as the Turmiel Formation and the El Pedregal Formation), the Sinemurian Coimbra Formation in Portugal, the Aganane Formation and Tafraout Group of Morocco, the Posidonia Beds of Greece, and the Marne di Monte Serrone of Italy. In the Adriatic section, this unit is equivalent to the Calcare di Sogno of Northern Italy. It represents almost the same type of ecosystem recovered in the older (Pliensbachian) Rotzo Formation of the Venetian region and the Podpeč Limestone of Slovenia, also known for its rich floral record.

== Regional Context ==
In Montenegro, Lower Jurassic carbonate deposits are seen intermittently along the Adriatic Carbonate Platform extending from Herzegovina into the region and reaching northern Albania. The Toarcian palaeogeography of Montenegro was characterised by two major units, mostly found in the Dinarides: the High Karst Zone, representing the Carbonate Platform, and the Budva Basin, which represented a shallow marine setting where ammonites were abundant, separated at the W of the Apulian Carbonate Platform by the deep-water Adriatic Basin. The previous Pliensbachian platform suffered partial flooding in some sectors and simultaneous emergence in others during the Toarcian, with the carbonate facies recovered west of Nikšić, northeast of Podgorica, and in the Rumija Mountain range remaining as environments close to the marginal part. These layers, generally overlaid by younger sediments, exhibit oolitic limestone characteristics, with late-diagenetic dolomite intercalations indicative of formation near the platform's margin. Key exposures appear west of Nikšić, northeast of Podgorica, and within the Rumija Mountain range.

During the Pliensbachian, most of the area was dominated by the Lithiotis Facies from Tolmin to Podgorica, with no proper emergent lands nearby. In the Toarcian, the nearest emergent lands were located to the northeast–southeast, from the west of Zagreb to Prozor, while the sectors at Montenegro and Albania were located in between ooid grainstone levels, representing a proximal carbonate ramp. The Budva basin evolution in the Toarcian was marked by the changes in the sea level, developing a distally steepened ramp until the Lower Toarcian and an accretionary rimmed platform in younger layers. The Adriatic-Dinaric Carbonate Platform is well measured at Mount Rumija where the transitional facies between the platform setting and the deeper pelagic environment are seen, recovering a lateral transition from a lagoonal environment exposed in Seoce to the platform edge, exposed in Tejani (called Tejani section), and finally, the deeper water environment, called Livari section, can be observed at Mount Rumija.

== Description ==
The formation is ~450 m thick and comprises well-bedded light brown to light grey limestones organized into meter-scale shoaling-upward cycles. Typical microfacies include lumachelle beds of Plicatostylidae, bioclastic packstone/wackestone, oncoid–peloid grainstone, and fenestral pelmicrites. Fenestral textures, vadose features (mouldic/corrosion voids with meteoric cements), and intermittent nodular horizons occur toward the top of cycles. Deposition took place in intratidal to supratidal lagoons along the platform interior; the uppermost part records opening toward deeper settings that were rapidly blanketed by Aalenian oolites. The base lies on Late Triassic Lofer Limestones without angular discordance; the top transitions sharply to Aalenian oolitic sands (Oolites of Mt. Rumija II). The Liassic age (likely Pliensbachian–early Toarcian) is constrained by the Plicatostylidae facies, Foraminifera content, and upward passage into Middle Jurassic oolitic units documented on Rumija. The main unit at Budoš is lithologically almost identical to the major fossiliferous levels of the Rotzo Formation, composed of bituminous limestones and marly limestones (fenestrate limestones and tempestites) with several episodes of emersion, all of coastal origin and rich in plant detritus and leaf remains, connected to the typical Lithiotis reefs found in the Pliensbachian–Toarcian carbonate platforms of the Adriatic region.

The unit is mostly known by its rich macroflora, the most complete of the Mediterranean Toarcian realm along with the Marne di Monte Serrone, with several characteristics such as the abundant presence of thermophilic Bennettitales and the dominance of the Seed Fern Pachypteris that grew in semi-arid climates. This particular province is characterized by fossil plants that belonged to the specific vegetation of intra-oceanic islands with the dominance of mangrove type swamps where Pachypteris dominated, and drier vegetation within the island regions of Maquis shrubland type (probably a number of species of the genera Brachyphyllum and Pagiophylum). The nearest emerged areas were present in the terrains of Sinjavina and Durmitor, marked by a paleorelief of Jurassic Bauxite-abundant deposits within karstified limestones and rare dolomites.

== Paleoenvironment ==
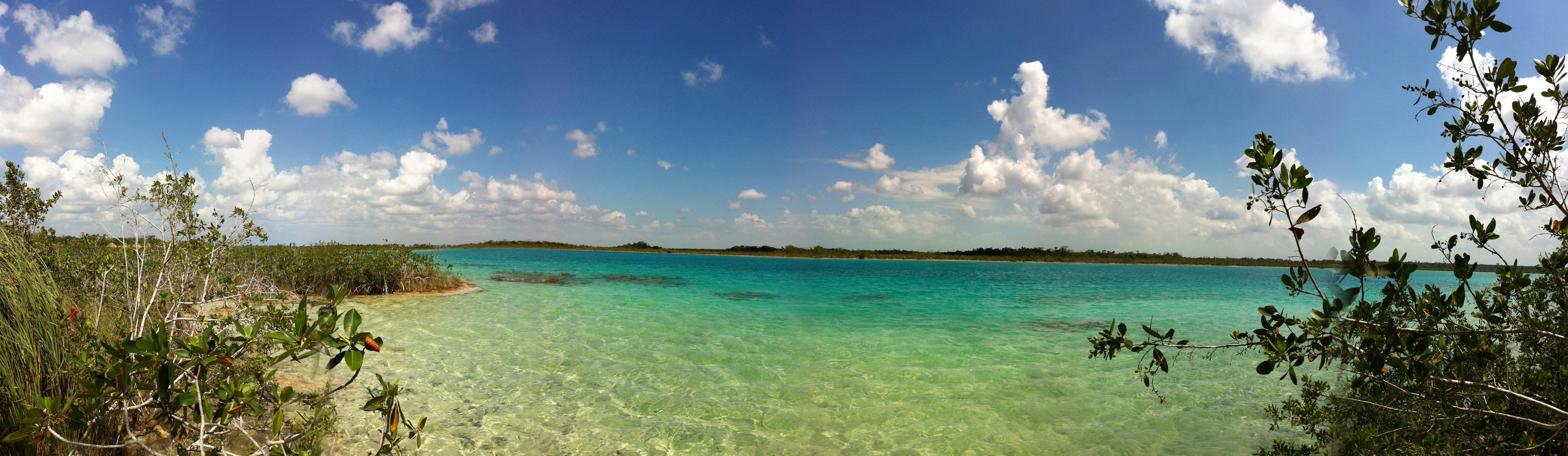
The Budoš Limestone was developed in a coastal setting with marine ingressions, likely a Mangrove-type environment (ex. with modern plants from Quintana Roo).

Facies architecture and fossil content indicate a low-energy, protected lagoon on the inner to middle ramp, with repeated shoaling-upward parasequences from Plicatostylidae-rich subtidal packstones to fenestral supratidal mud-rich beds. Local hardgrounds, vadose cements, and rare breccias record brief emersion events before progradation of oolitic shoals during the Middle Jurassic. Local Budos flora developed on an island setting in the Dinaric Carbonate Platform, likely linked with the exposed layers of Seoce. This setting would be made of the emerged Budoshi High, representing an island flora; a humid belt would have existed along the shore, while coniferous vegetation would have prevailed in the drier interior. The Budoš flora, as well as the Rumija and Seoce Lithiotis facies, developed after the Livari supersequence created a massive lagoon on the inner ramp. A common facies in the 3 locations shows about 1–2 m thick lagoon parasequences, from Lithiotis rich subtidal packstone to shallower wackestone, where the lagoonal shale facies recovering the flora is deposited.

The main consensus is that the layers rich in flora belong to a Bahamian-type Mangrove system developed on a coastal setting with a nearby Macchia arid inland setting dominated by Hirmeriellaceae and Araucariaceae conifers, as well as Bennettites, that was either an island inside a Carbonate platform or part of a larger landmass. The mangrove system was mostly composed of seed ferns bearing the leaf genus Pachypteris linked with complex root systems that cover most of the layers which then developed over and linked with the local aberrant bivalve (Lithiotis) reefs as a belt around the coast, yet it is unknown how far it reached. The inland setting was dry and had common wildfire activity, as shown by the great amount of charcoal recovered in some of the layers. The Lithiotis layers are intercalated by oolitic and oncolitic layers of likely subtidal/lagoonal origin, with several coastal cycles measured, such as the development of lagoons and complete flooding of the vegetation levels, as well small coal-dominated sections. The ingression-regression trend allowed the development of the local mangroves.

The same type of ecosystem was also recovered more recently on slightly older (Late Pliensbachian) rocks on Albania that may belong to the same unit, also with great dominance of the genus Pachypteris linked with root systems along Lithiotis reefs, with evidence of catastrophic events which killed the flora. These types of layers have been vinculated with the early evolution of crabs.

== Fossil content ==
Color key: Taxon / Reclassified taxon / Taxon falsely reported as present / Dubious taxon or junior synonym / Ichnotaxon / Ootaxon / Morphotaxon

Notes
Uncertain or tentative taxa are in small text
~~crossed out~~ taxa are discredited.

=== Foraminifera ===
Genus	Species	Location	Material	Notes	Images
Glomospira	G. sp.	Seoce	Isolated Tests/Shells	Ammodiscidae	
Involutina	I. jurassica	Seoce	Isolated Tests/Shells	Trocholinidae	
Orbitopsella	O. praecursor	Seoce	Isolated Tests/Shells	Mesoendothyridae	
Pseudocyclammina	P. liasica; P. spp.	Seoce	Isolated Tests/Shells	Pfenderinidae	
Spirilina	S. spp.	Seoce	Isolated Tests/Shells	Spirillinidae	
Vidalina	V. martana	Seoce	Isolated Tests/Shells	Cornuspiridae	

=== Brachiopoda ===
Genus	Species	Location	Material	Notes	Images
Cuneirhynchia	C. dalmasi	Livari, Rumija	Isolated Shells	A Rhynchonellidan brachiopoda, member of Prionorhynchiidae	
Livarirhynchia	L. rajkae	Livari, Rumija	Isolated Shells	A Rhynchonellidan brachiopoda, member of Allorhynchidae	
Homoeorhynchia	H. lubrica	Livari, Rumija	Isolated Shells	A Rhynchonellidan brachiopoda, member of Rhynchonellidae	
Prionorhynchia	P. fraasi	Livari, Rumija	Isolated Shells	A Rhynchonellidan brachiopoda, member of Prionorhynchiidae	
Rhapidothyris	R. sp.	Livari, Rumija	Isolated Shells	A Terebratulidan brachiopoda, member of Lobothyrididae	
Sepkoskirhynchia	S. sphaerica	Livari, Rumija	Isolated Shells	A Rhynchonellidan brachiopoda, member of Basiliolidae	
Skadarirhynchia	S. semicostata	Livari, Rumija	Isolated Shells	A Rhynchonellidan brachiopoda, member of Basiliolidae	

=== Mollusks ===
Accumulations of Nerineidae gastropods are common. Large, thick-walled gastropods are common in the middle and upper parts of the section. High-spired lagoonal gastropods (non-marine tolerant taxa) are found.

Genus	Species	Location	Material	Notes	Images
Cochlearites	C. loppianus	Budos Mountain; Livari, Rumija; Seoce; Tejani	Isolated & acummulated Shells	An oyster of the family Plicatostylidae.	Cochlearites
Gervilleioperna	G. ombonii; G. sp.	Budos Mountain; Livari, Rumija; Seoce	Isolated & acummulated Shells	An oyster of the family Plicatostylidae.	Gervillioperna
Lithioperna	L. (Lithiopedalion) kuehni; L. scutata; L. spp.	Budos Mountain; Livari, Rumija; Seoce; Tejani	Isolated & acummulated Shells	An oyster of the family Plicatostylidae.	Lithioperna
Lithiotis	L. problematica; L. sp.	Budos Mountain; Livari, Rumija; Seoce	Isolated & acummulated Shells	An oyster of the family Plicatostylidae.	Lithiotis
Manticula	M. problematica	Budos Mountain	Isolated Shells	An oyster of the family Pergamidiidae.	
Mytiloperna	M. lepsii	Budos Mountain; Livari, Rumija; Seoce	Isolated Shells	An oyster of the family Malleidae.	
Mytilus	M. spp.	Budos Mountain; Livari, Rumija; Seoce	Isolated Shells	A mussel of the family Mytilidae	Mytilus
Pleurotomaria	P. sp.	Budos Mountain; Livari, Rumija; Seoce	Shells	A Snail of the family Pleurotomariidae.	Pleurotomaria

=== Echinodermata ===
Common crinoid ossicles and sea urchin fragments mark brief open-marine incursions into the lagoons.

Genus	Species	Location	Material	Notes	Images
Cotylederma	C. sp.	Tejani	Multiple ossicles	A Crinoidean, member of the family Cotyledermatidae	
Isocrinus	I. psilonoti; I. spp.	Tejani	Multiple ossicles	A Crinoidean, member of the family Isocrininae	
Pentacrinites	P. cf. fossilis	Tejani	Sections	A Crinoidean, member of the family Pentacrinitidae	Pentacrinites

=== Algae ===
Unspecified stromatolitic laminae (Cyanophyceae?) are found in multiple levels.

Genus	Species	Location	Material	Notes	Images
Cayeuxia	C. liasica; C.? piae; C. spp.	Seoce	Imprints	A Green alga of the Halimedaceae or Udoteaceae family.	
Palaeodasycladus	P. mediterraneus; P. spp.	Seoce	Imprints	A green alga of the family Dasycladaceae.	P. mediterraneus specimens
Scrinocassis	S. sp.	Budoš	Cysts	Affinities with Scriniocassiaceae. Brackish Green Algae, related to lagoonar water bodies.	
Thaumatoporella	T. parvovesiculifera	Seoce	Imprints	A encrusting green alga of the Thaumatoporellales group. The dominant alga locally.	

=== Bryophyta ===
Genus	Species	Location	Material	Notes	Images
Porcellispora	P. longdonensis	Budoš	Spores	Incertae sedis; affinities with Bryophyta.	

=== Lycophytes ===
Genus	Species	Location	Material	Notes	Images
Aratrisporites	A. sp	Budoš	Spores	Affinities with Isoetaceae.	
Densoisporites	D. "sp. A"; D. "sp. B"; D. "sp. C"	Budoš	Spores	Affinities with Isoetaceae.	
Foveosporites	F. vissheri; F. sp."	Budoš	Spores	Affinities with the family Lycopodiaceae.	Extant Lycopodium.

=== Polypodiophyta ===
Genus	Species	Location	Material	Notes	Images
Calamospora	C. sp.	Budoš	Spores	Affinities with Calamitaceae or Equisetaceae.	Modern Equisetum
Concavisporites	C. cf. kaiseri; C. "sp. A"; C. "sp. B"; C. cf. G. unbonatus	Budoš	Spores	Affinities with Gleicheniaceae. Tropical Ferns related to humid ferric soils.	Extant Gleichenia.
Coniopteris	C. sp.	Budoš	Isolated pinnae	A Fern related with Polypodiales.	Coniopteris specimen
Deltoidospora	D. minor	Budoš	Spores	Incertade Sedis Pteridophytes.	
Duplexisporites	D. problematicus	Budoš	Spores	Affinities with Cibotiaceae.	Extant Cibotium
Equisetites	E. columnaris; E. sp.	Budoš	Isolated Stems	Affinities with Equisetaceae.	
Granulatisporites	G. "sp. A"; G. "sp. B"; G. "sp. C"	Budoš	Spores	Affinities with Dipteridaceae inside Pteridophyta. Fern spores related to freshwater ponds.	Extant Dipteris.
Ischyosporites	I. sp.	Budoš	Spores	Incertade Sedis Pteridophytes.	
Klukisporites	K. variegatus; K. neovariegatus	Budoš	Spores	Affinities with the family Lygodiaceae.	Extant Lygodium
Leptolepidites	L. macroverrucosus; L. cf. crassibalteus	Budoš	Spores	Affinities with Dennstaedtiaceae.	Extant Dennstaedtia.
Matonisporites	M. cf. phlebopteroides	Budoš	Spores	Affinities with Matoniaceae. It resembles the spores of the extant Gleichenia dicarpa.	Extant Gleichenia
Monolites	M. couperi	Budoš	Spores	Affinities with Polypodiaceae.	Extant Drynaria.
Murospora	M. cf. bicolateralis	Budoš	Spores	Incertade Sedis Pteridophytes.	
Obtusisporites	O. sp	Budoš	Spores	Affinities with Cyatheaceae.	Extant Cyathea
Skarbysporites	S. sp.	Budoš	Spores	Incertade Sedis Pteridophytes.	
Styxisporites	S. sp	Budoš	Spores	Incertade Sedis Pteridophytes.	
Verrucosisporites	V. "sp. A"; V. "sp. B"	Budoš	Spores	Incertade Sedis Pteridophytes.	

=== Spermatophyta ===
Genus	Species	Location	Material	Notes	Images
Bennettiteaepollenites	B. sp.	Budoš	Pollen	Affinities with Bennettitales.	
Brachyphyllum	B. crucis	Budoš	Branched shoots	Affinities with Araucariaceae or Hirmeriellaceae.	Brachyphyllum
Callialasporites	C. sp.	Budoš	Pollen	Affinities with the family Araucariaceae.	Extant Araucaria.
Caytonia	C. sp.	Budoš	Pollen Organs	Pollen organ of Caytoniales.	
Cerebropollenites	C. macroverrucosus	Budoš	Pollen	Affinities with Sciadopityaceae.	Extant Sciadopitys.
Classopollis	C. cf. chateaunovi; C. "sp. A"; C. "sp. B"; C. "sp. C"; C. meyeriana; C. cf. simplex	Budoš	Pollen	Affinities with Hirmeriellaceae.	
Cycadopites	C. "sp. A"; C. "sp. B"; C. cf. follicularis	Budoš	Pollen	Affinities with the family Cycadaceae.	Extant Cycas.
Elatides	E. williamsoni	Budoš	Branched shoots	Affinities with Cupressaceae.	Elatides
Eretmophyllum	E. sp.	Budoš	Branched shoots	Affinities with Ginkgoales.	
Lindleycladus	L. lanceolatus	Budoš	Branched shoots	Affinities with Krassiloviaceae.	
Otozamites	O. beani; O. cf.gramineus; O. tenuatus; O. sp.	Budoš	Isolated leaflets	Affinities with Williamsoniaceae.	Otozamites specimen
Pachypteris	P. papillosa; P. sp	Budoš	Isolated pinnae	Affinities Corystospermaceae. Mangrove-type plant.	
Pagiophyllum	P. kurri	Budoš	Branched shoots	Affinities with Araucariaceae or Hirmeriellaceae.	Pagiophyllum
Ptilophyllum	P. pectinoides; P. cf. pecten	Budoš	Isolated leaflets	Affinities with Williamsoniaceae.	Ptilophyllum
Pityosporites	P. sp	Budoš	Pollen	Affinities with the family Pinaceae.	Extant Tsuga.
Podocarpidites	P. sp.	Budoš	Pollen	Affinities with the Podocarpaceae.	Extant Podocarpus.
Vitreisporites	V. pallidus	Budoš	Pollen	Pollen from the family Caytoniaceae.	
Zamites	Z. sp.	Budoš	Isolated leaflets	Affinities with Williamsoniaceae.	Zamites

== See also ==
- List of fossiliferous stratigraphic units in Montenegro
- Toarcian turnover
- Pliensbachian formations
- Toarcian formations
- Marne di Monte Serrone, Italy
- Calcare di Sogno, Italy
- Posidonia Shale, Lagerstätte, Germany
- Ciechocinek Formation, Germany and Poland
- Krempachy Marl Formation, Poland and Slovakia
- Lava Formation, Lithuania
- El Pedregal Formation, Spain
- Tafraout Group, Morocco
- Azilal Formation, Morocco
- Calcaires du Bou Dahar, Morocco
- Whitby Mudstone, England
- Fernie Formation, Alberta and British Columbia
- Poker Chip Shale
- Whiteaves Formation, British Columbia
- Navajo Sandstone, Utah
- Los Molles Formation, Argentina
- Mawson Formation, Antarctica
- Kandreho Formation, Madagascar
- Kota Formation, India
- Cattamarra Coal Measures, Australia
