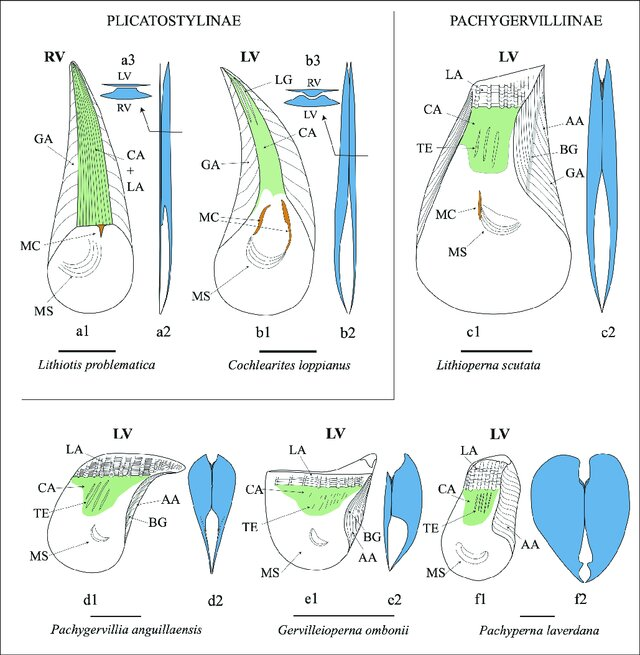
- Selection of members of the family

Scientific classification
- Kingdom: Animalia
- Phylum: Mollusca
- Class: Bivalvia
- Order: Pteriida
- Superfamily: Pterioidea
- Family: †Plicatostylidae; Lupher & Packard, 1929

Synonyms
- Cochlearitidae Benini & Loriga, 1977; Lithiotidae Cox, 1971

= Plicatostylidae =

Plicatostylidae Temporal range: Early Jurassic-Eocene (Sinemurian-Priabonian) 199–37 Ma

Extinct family of molluscs

Plicatostylidae is a family of extinct large-sized epifaunal marine-brackish bivalves that inhabited Europe, Asia, Africa and America during the Jurassic, though they survived until the Eocene. These groups are informally known as "Lithiotids" or "Lithiotid Bivalves". They represent large reef builders, analogues to their extant relative Isognomon, as well younger Rudists and modern Crassostrea, Magallana and less extent to Tridacna. The genera of this family were likely photosymbiotic suspension feeders similar to Malleidae.

== Systematics ==
Plicatostylidae was stablished by Lupher & Packard in 1929. The family was originally established for the aberrant stick-like genus Plicatostylus (Lithiotis?), but then subsequent works synonymized Plicatostylus with Lithiotis, and treated the names Lithiotidae Cox, 1971 and Cochlearitidae Accorsi Benini & Broglio Loriga, 1977 as junior synonyms of Plicatostylidae. A major systematic revision in 2023 redefined the family primarily on the basis of shell microstructure: an outer layer of prismatic calcite, a middle nacreous layer, and a thick inner layer of fibrous, irregular, spherulitic prismatic aragonite (FISphP microstructure).

The family is divided into two subfamilies:

- Plicatostylinae Lupher & Packard, 1929 – highly elongated, stick- or spoon-shaped forms attached by a thick pedestal valve.
- Pachygervilliinae Posenato & Crippa, 2023 – medium-sized to large, mytiliform to flattened or cup-shaped forms.

The genus Pachygervillia was erected in 2023 for material previously recorded in open nomenclature as "Isognomon (Mytiloperna) spp". Phylogenetic relationships to other pterioids (especially Isognomonidae and Bakevelliidae) remain incompletely resolved, although the shared microstructure and stratigraphic sequence suggest that the Pachygervilliinae may include ancestral forms from which the more specialized stick-like Plicatostylinae evolved.

== Description ==
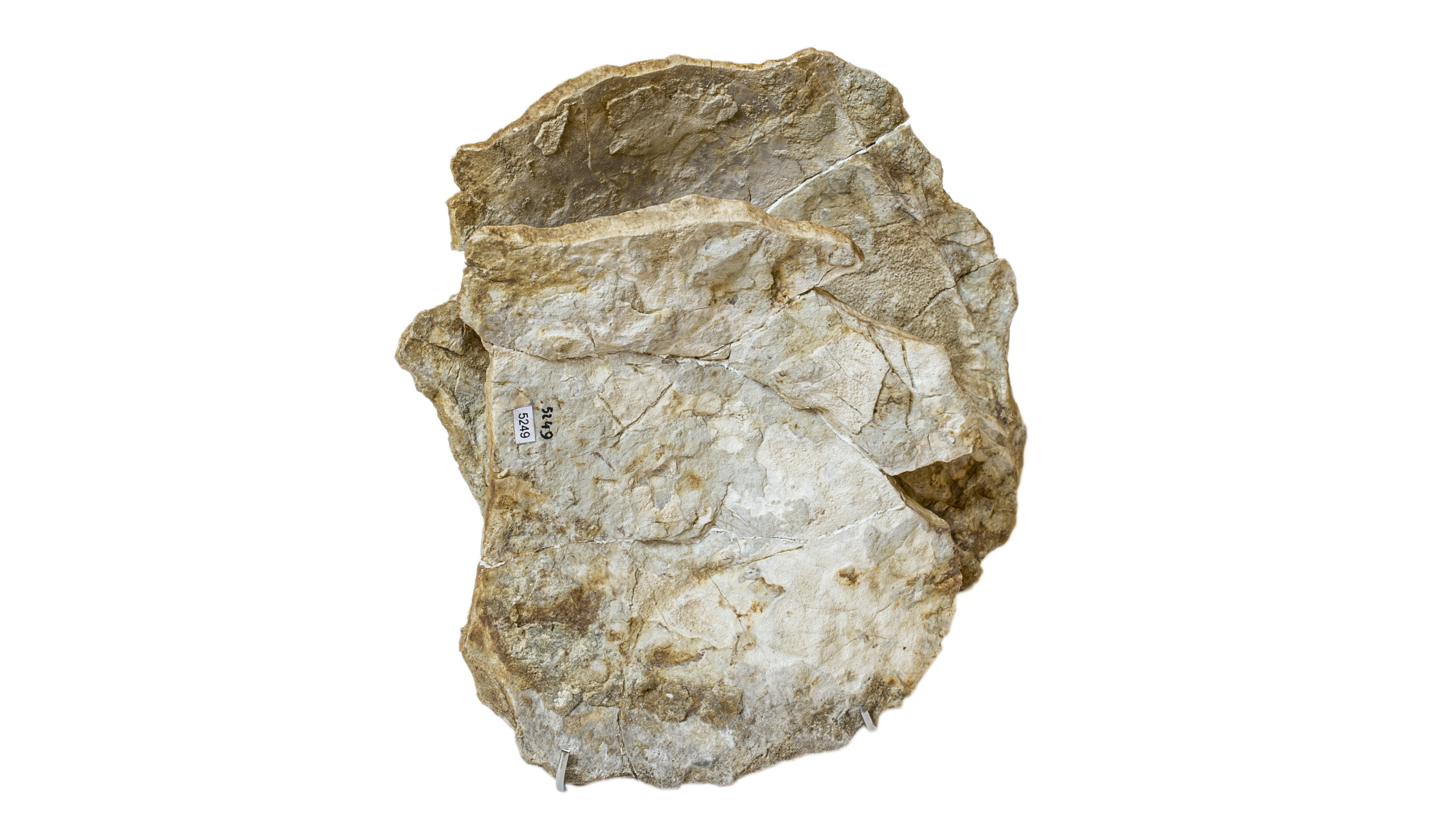
Lithioperna scutata specimen from MUSE

Members of Plicatostylidae are characterized by large to very large, thick, monomyarian shells with a markedly reduced body cavity confined to the ventral (adapertural) end. Shells range from strongly elongated and compressed (stick- or spoon-shaped in Plicatostylinae) to mytiliform, linguiform, or cup-shaped (Pachygervilliinae). The spoon-shaped Lithiotis reaching heights of 25-30 cm and a thickness of up to 1.5-3 cm, with the largest as high as 50 cm and some specimens of Lithioperna reaching 70 cm and 4 cm thick. Valves may be strongly inequivalve (especially Lithiotis, with one thick pedestal valve and one thin free valve) or subequivalve. The internal surface is typically tripartite: a median cardinal (or contact) area flanked by lateral “feather-like” zones formed by successive growth increments. In Plicatostylinae the cardinal area is elongated and may be furrowed by parallel ligament grooves (Lithiotis) or bear a complementary ridge-and-groove system (Cochlearites). In Pachygervilliinae the cardinal area is broad and often bears irregular, elongated teeth in adult stages. A byssal notch or gape is present in some genera.

== Ecology ==
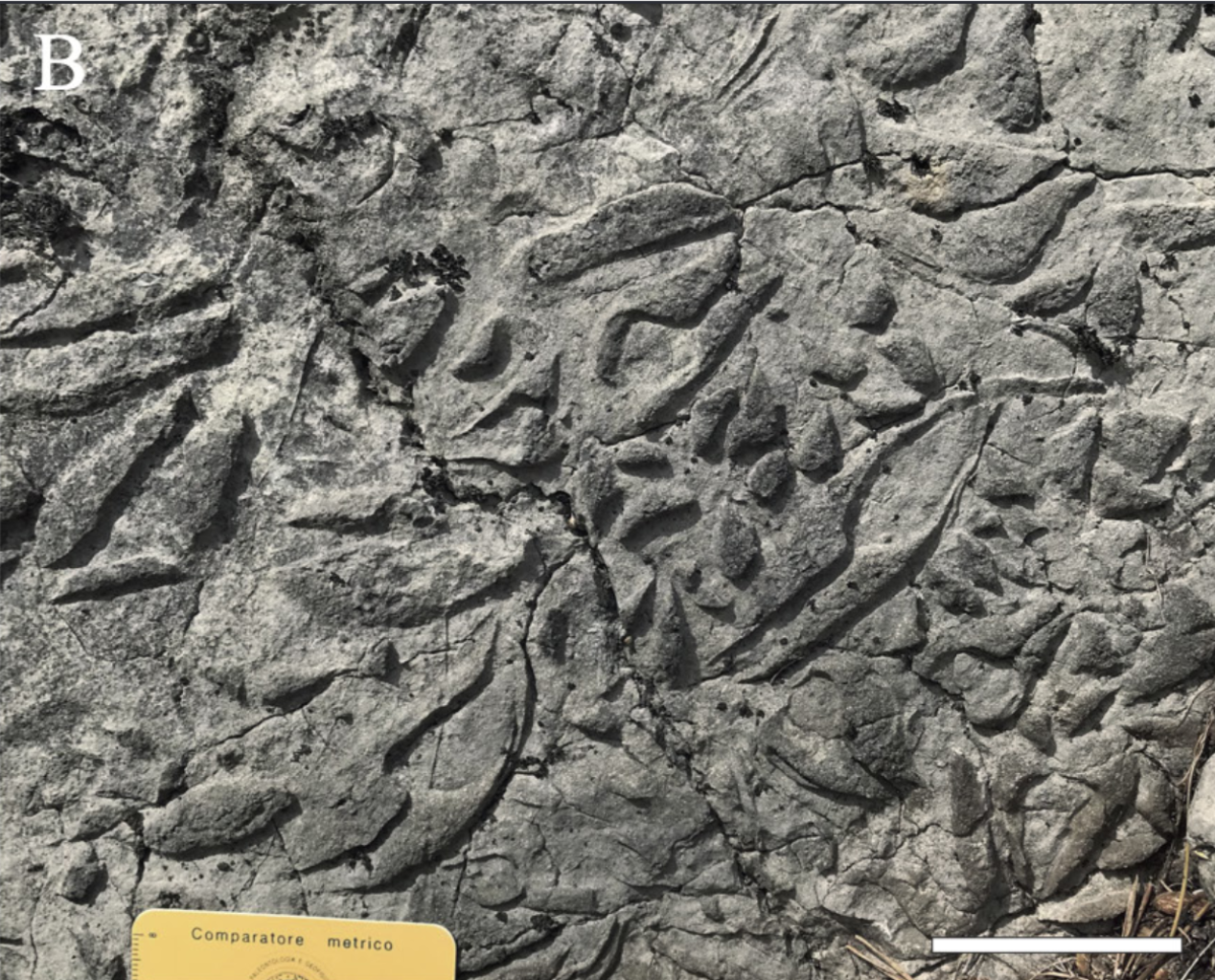
An in-situ bed of Pachygervillia from the lower Rotzo Formation

Plicatostylids radiated rapidly in the aftermath of the End-Triassic mass extinction, temporarily occupying the ecological niche of reef builders during the Early Jurassic “reef eclipse” when scleractinian coral reefs were rare. They represent classic crisis progenitors: morphologically specialized forms adapted to the unusual environmental conditions of the recovery interval.

They developed in large reef systems like modern Crassostrea, but in warm, shallow seas, with some bioherms attaining lengths over 60 m and thicknesses of 3-5 m. They were rapid growers, with their shells often made of aragonite, leading to massive shell accumulations that shaped the sea floor, known as the "Lithiotis Facies". This facies not only include this family, but also the myalinid Pseudopachymytilus, the carditid Opisoma, and the megalodontids or potential stem hippuritids Pachymegalodon and Protodiceras.

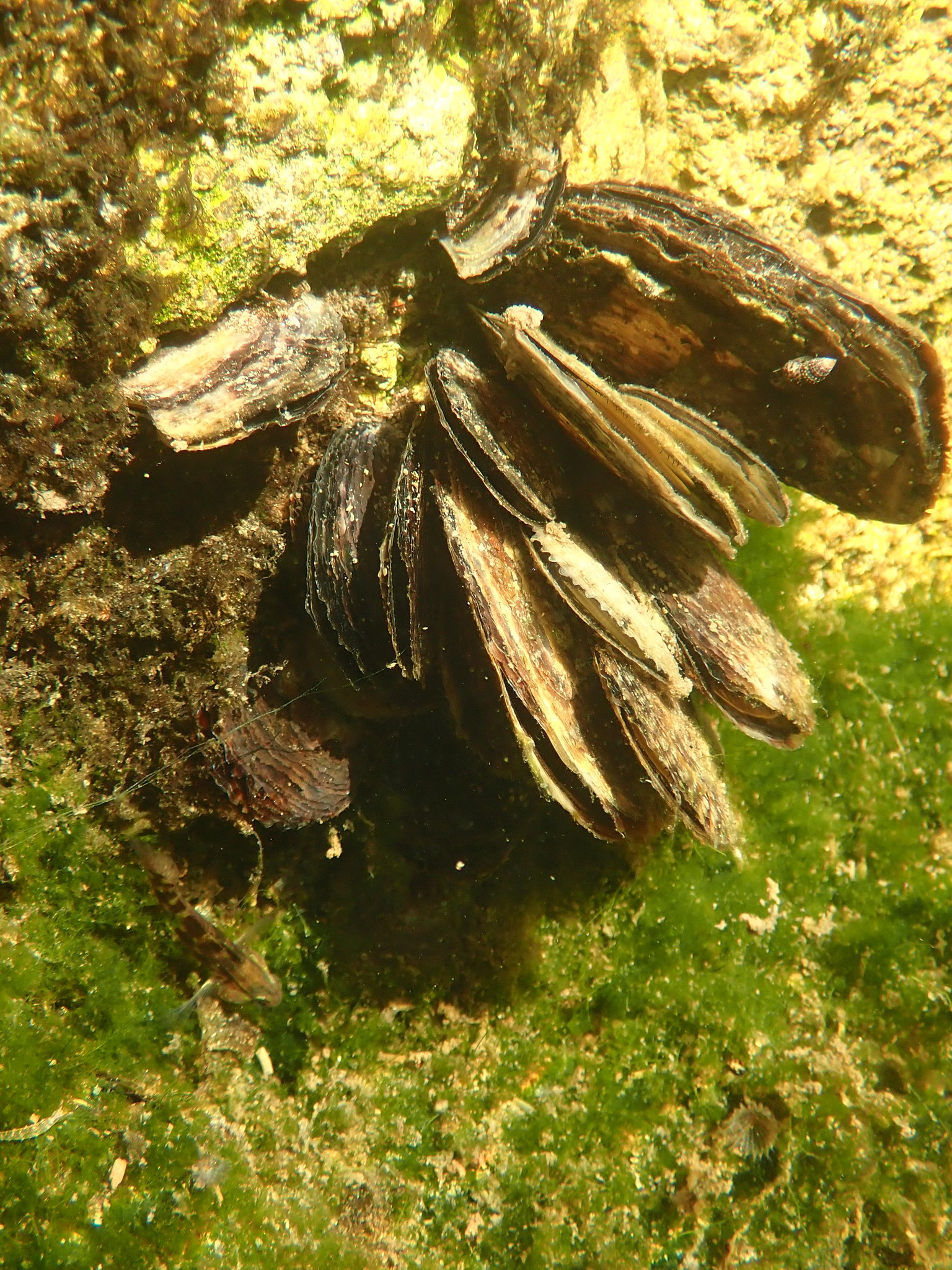
Some plicatostylid taxa like Gervilleioperna and Pachygervillia occupied a similar niche to the extant Isognomon (pictured here)

Individuals grew in an upright (subvertical) orientation with the ventral margin directed upward. Rapid sedimentation of carbonate mud required continuous upward growth so that the small soft-body cavity remained above the sediment–water interface. Specimens that grew too slowly were buried. Aggregates provided mutual physical support; juveniles frequently settled on the shells of adults. Cementation to the substrate or to neighbouring shells occurred at least in early ontogeny and may have persisted throughout life in Lithiotis. Some genera retained a functional byssus. Shells frequently show “bent-knee” morphologies indicating active reorientation during growth when an individual became tilted.

Sclerochronological analyses of well-preserved aragonitic shells reveal first-order growth increments interpreted as annual. Maximum ventral growth rates reach approximately 20 mm per year in Lithioperna; most other genera grew more slowly (typically a few to ~15 mm per year). Longevity estimates for large individuals of Lithiotis are on the order of several decades. The dense calcification, upright radiating growth habit of Lithiotis and Cochlearites (often forming bouquet-like clusters that do not align commissures with prevailing currents), and occupation of oligotrophic settings have led to the suggestion that these genera harboured photosymbionts, analogous to some modern pterioids and giant clams.

A consistent ecological partitioning is observed: Gervilleioperna and Pachygervillia occupied Tidal flat to inner-platform and restricted settings. Lithioperna was widespread in lagoonal subtidal environments, including some low-oxygen or marsh-influenced facies. Lithiotis and Cochlearites constructed subtidal buildups, the largest of which exceed 60 m in length and 3-5 m in thickness.

These bivalves were major players in their marine ecosystems, contributing to the geological structure of carbonate platforms. Plicatosylids were notably widespread in the Lower Jurassic, specially within the Sinemurian-Pliensbachian, with significant occurrences in Tethyan and Panthalassan margins, from areas in Italy (Rotzo Formation of the Trento Platform, Apennine Carbonate Platform), Slovenia (Podpeč Limestone), Montenegro (Budoš Limestone), Spain, Switzerland and parts of North America (e.g. California, Nevada & Oregon). In High Atlas of Morocco (ex. Aganane Formation & Tafraout Group) they are found in association with Corals, suggesting a different ecological context during their later survival. Some endemic species (ex. Lithiotis timorensis) were described from Timor. Other faunas are seen in the Himalayas. The oldest records are Middle-Late Sinemurian specimens of Gervilleioperna in the Calcari Grigi Group. Most of these bivalves met their end during a significant environmental upheaval known as the Toarcian Oceanic Anoxic Event, which altered ocean chemistry and made survival challenging. Yet, in some areas like Morocco or the Apennine Mountains, they persisted, showing some adaptability. Gervilleioperna survived until at least the Aalenian in Chile, likely due to having a small shell. Potential members of the family are found in the Bajocian member IV of the Agoudim Formation. The genus Pachyperna is known from the Eocene (Bartonian-Priabonian?), revelating the group also survived the Cretaceous–Paleogene extinction event.

== Genera, subgenera & species ==
Subfamily Pachygervilliinae:

- †Gervilleioperna
  - G. ombonii
  - G. timorensis
  - G. atlantis
  - G. buchi
  - G. termieri
  - G. (Gervilleiognoma) aurita
  - G. (Gervilletia) turgida
- †Lithioperna
  - L. scutata
  - L. (Lithiopedalion) kuehni
- †Pachygervillia
  - P. anguillaensis
  - P. taramellii
- †Pachyperna
  - P. goniglensis
  - P. joaquinensis
  - P. laverdana

Subfamily Plicatostylinae:

- †Cochlearites
  - C. loppianus
- †Lithiotis
  - L. problematica
  - L. timorensis
- †Plicatostylus(?) (type; junior synonym of Lithiotis?)
  - P. gregarius

== See also ==
- Alatoconchidae large sized Paleozoic Bivalves
- Isognomon close extant relative capable of develop bioherms along mangroves
- Magallana extant bioherm developing bivalve
- Rudists reef developing Bivalves
- Tridacna extant lage-sized reef dwelling bivalve
