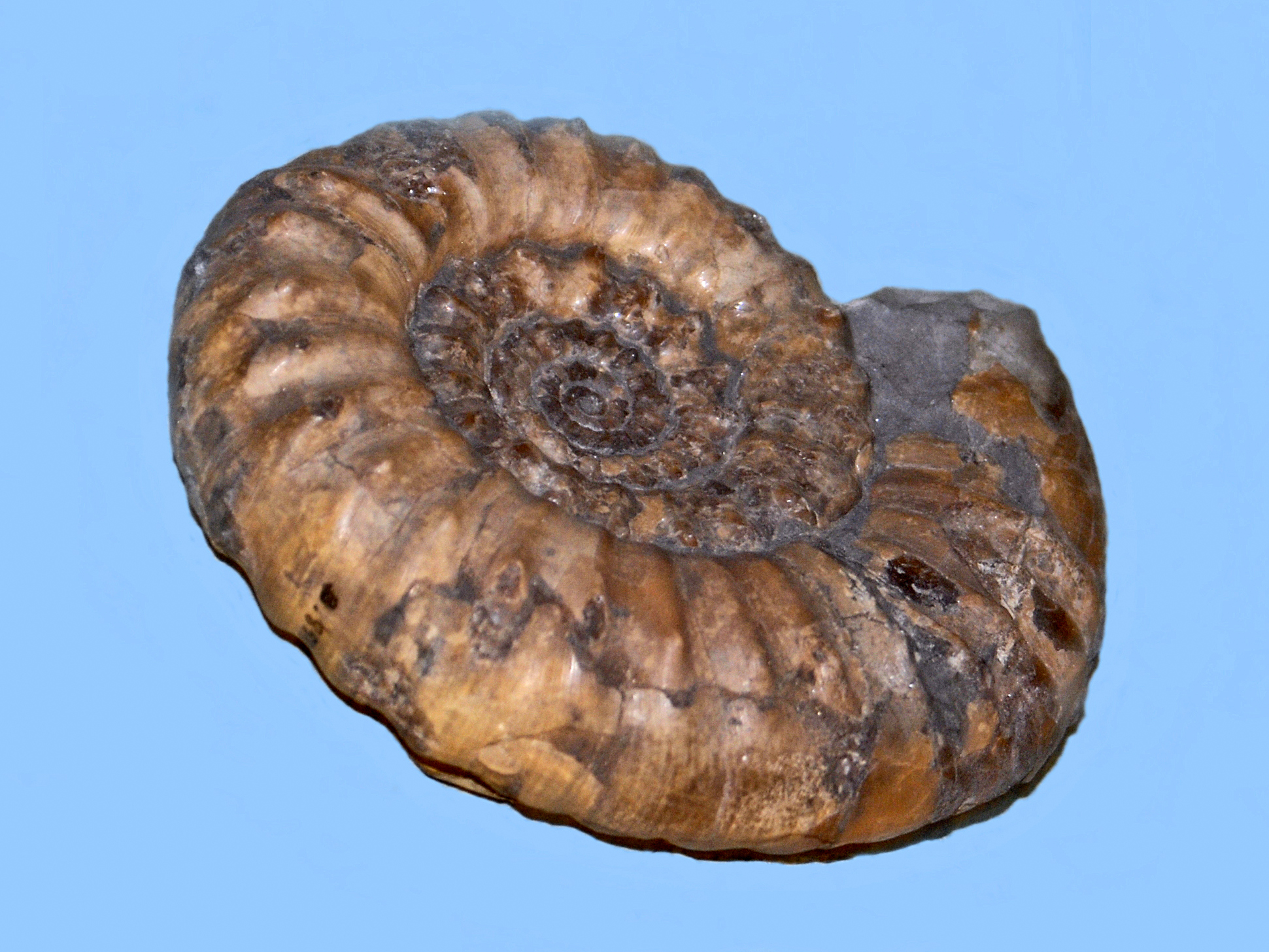
- Fossil shells of Androgynoceras species from Lyme Regis (England), on display at Galerie de paléontologie et d'anatomie comparée in Paris

Scientific classification
- Kingdom: Animalia
- Phylum: Mollusca
- Class: Cephalopoda
- Subclass: †Ammonoidea
- Order: †Ammonitida
- Family: †Liparoceratidae
- Genus: †Androgynoceras; Hyatt, 1867

Species
- A. alloeotypus; A. capricornum; A. geyeri; A. heterogenes; A. hybrida; A. lataecosta; A. mickletonense; A. naptonense; A. sparsicosta

= Androgynoceras =

Androgynoceras Temporal range: Pliensbachian

Genus of molluscs (fossil)

Androgynoceras is an extinct genus of cephalopod belonging to the ammonite subclass. The Green Ammonite Beds of the Dorset Coast are named after Androgynoceras lataecosta which has chambers filled with green calcite.

== Distribution ==
Jurassic of Austria, France, Germany, Serbia and Montenegro, Spain, Switzerland and the United Kingdom.
