= Adriatic Basin =

Oceanic basin under the Adriatic Sea

Coordinates: 43°N 15°E

Depth of the Adriatic Sea

The Adriatic Abyssal Plain, more commonly referred to as the Adriatic Basin, is an oceanic basin under the Adriatic Sea. The Adriatic Sea's average depth is 252.5 metres (828 ft), and its maximum depth is 1,233 metres (4,045 ft); however, the North Adriatic basin rarely exceeds a depth of 100 metres (330 ft).

== Expanse ==
The North Adriatic basin, extending between Venice and Trieste towards a line connecting Ancona and Zadar, is only 15 metres (49 ft) deep at its northwestern end; it gradually deepens towards the southeast. It is the largest Mediterranean shelf and is simultaneously a dilution basin and a site of bottom water formation. The Middle Adriatic basin is south of the Ancona–Zadar line, with the 270-metre (890 ft) deep Middle Adriatic Pit (also called the Pomo Depression or the Jabuka Pit). The 170-metre (560 ft) deep Palagruža Sill is south of the Middle Adriatic Pit, separating it from the 1,200-metre (3,900 ft) deep South Adriatic Pit and the Middle Adriatic basin from the South Adriatic Basin. Further on to the south, the sea floor rises to 780 metres (2,560 ft) to form the Otranto Sill at the boundary to the Ionian Sea.

The South Adriatic Basin is similar in many respects to the Northern Ionian Sea, to which it is connected.

== See also ==
- List of submarine topographical features

== Sources ==
- Blake, Gerald Henry; Topalović, Duško; Schofield, Clive H (1996). The maritime boundaries of the Adriatic Sea. IBRU. ISBN 978-1-897643-22-8.
- Bombace, Giovanni (1992). "Fisheries of the Adriatic Sea". In Colombo, Giuseppe (ed.). Marine Eutrophication and Population Dynamics: With a Special Section on the Adriatic Sea: 25th European Marine Biology Symposium, Institute of Zoology, University of Ferrara. Olsen&Olsen. ISBN 978-87-85215-19-2.
- Cushman-Roisin, Benoit; Gačić, Miroslav; Poulain, Pierre-Marie (2001). Physical oceanography of the Adriatic Sea. Springer. ISBN 978-1-4020-0225-0.
