= Kota Formation =

Geological formation in India

- Stratigraphic range: Jurassic; ~190.8–161.5 Ma
- Type: Geological formation
- Sub-units: Lower & Upper members
- Underlies: Unconformity with the Gangapur Formation and Chikiala Formation
- Overlies: Dharmaram Formation
- Thickness: 550–600 m (1,800–1,970 ft)

Lithology
- Primary: Mudstone, sandstone
- Other: Limestone

Location
- Coordinates: 18.9°N 80.0°E
- Approximate paleocoordinates: 31.6°S 31.9°E
- Region: Telangana
- Country: India
- Extent: Pranhita-Godavari Basin

Type section
- Named for: Kota Village
- Kota Formation (India)

The Kota Formation is a geological formation in India. The age of the Kota Formation is uncertain; it is commonly considered to date to the Early Jurassic, but some studies have suggested it may extend into the Middle Jurassic or even later. It conformably overlies the Lower Jurassic Upper Dharmaram Formation and is unconformably overlain by the Lower Cretaceous Gangapur Formation. It is split into a Lower Member and Upper Member. The Lower Member is approximately 100 m thick while the Upper Member is 490 m thick. Both subunits primarily consist of mudstone and sandstone, but near the base of the upper unit there is a 20-30 metre thick succession of limestone deposited in a freshwater setting.

== Stratigraphy ==
The lower boundary of the Kota Formation is made of pebbly sandstone, covering the topmost clay seen in the Dharmaram Formation. The Kota Formation has been traditionally divided into 2 main members, the Lower and Upper members, yet more recent work have redivided it into 3. The Lower member can be seen at locations such as Adamilli, Kamavarapukota and Sudikonda, being made of sandstones, with clay clasts, with greater or lower stratification. The Middle Member is well developed along the Continental Gondwana basin, specially towards the northwestern part, and is made of medium to fine white sandstone with clay and concretionary limestone, suggesting the development of paleosols associated with alluvial floodplains. The last member is mostly made of broad sandstone sheets with large clay casts associated with fluvial channels, and has an extension that can be easuly seen on several continuous kilometers. The Uppermost section of the unit is mostly made of limestones and is overlain on an angular unconformity by the Gangapur Formation.

== Age ==
The age of the Kota Formation is controversial. There are no magmatic rocks or volcanic ash beds associated with the Kota Formation, which means that its age cannot be determined directly through radiometric dating. The maximum age of the Kota Formation is constrained by the underlying Upper Dharmaram Formation, which is Early Jurassic, probably Hettangian or Sinemurian, in age. Various researchers have attempted to date the Kota Formation using biostratigraphy. Krishnan (1968), Jain (1973), and Yadagiri and Prasad (1977) favored an Early Jurassic age based on the fish fauna. Govindan (1975) suggested a Middle Jurassic age based on ostracods. In 2006, Bandyopadhyay and Sengupta argued that the fish fauna suggested a Toarcian age for the Upper Kota Formation, possibly extending into the Aalenian, and in turn estimated the Lower Kota to be Sinemurian to Pliensbachian in age. Guntupalli V. R. Prasad, along with various coauthors, has argued for a younger age. In 2001, Vijaya and Prasad proposed based on palynological evidence that the Kota Formation was deposited between the Callovian age of the Middle Jurassic and the Barremian age of the Early Cretaceous. In 2002, Prasad and Manhas argued that the mammal genus Dyskritodon, known only from the Kota Formation and the Early Cretaceous of Morocco, provides evidence for a young age for the Kota Formation. In 2020, Prasad and Parmar argued that the similarity of the dinosaur fauna of the Kota Formation to that of the Middle Jurassic of the United Kingdom supported a Middle Jurassic age for the Kota Formation.

== Paleoenvironment ==
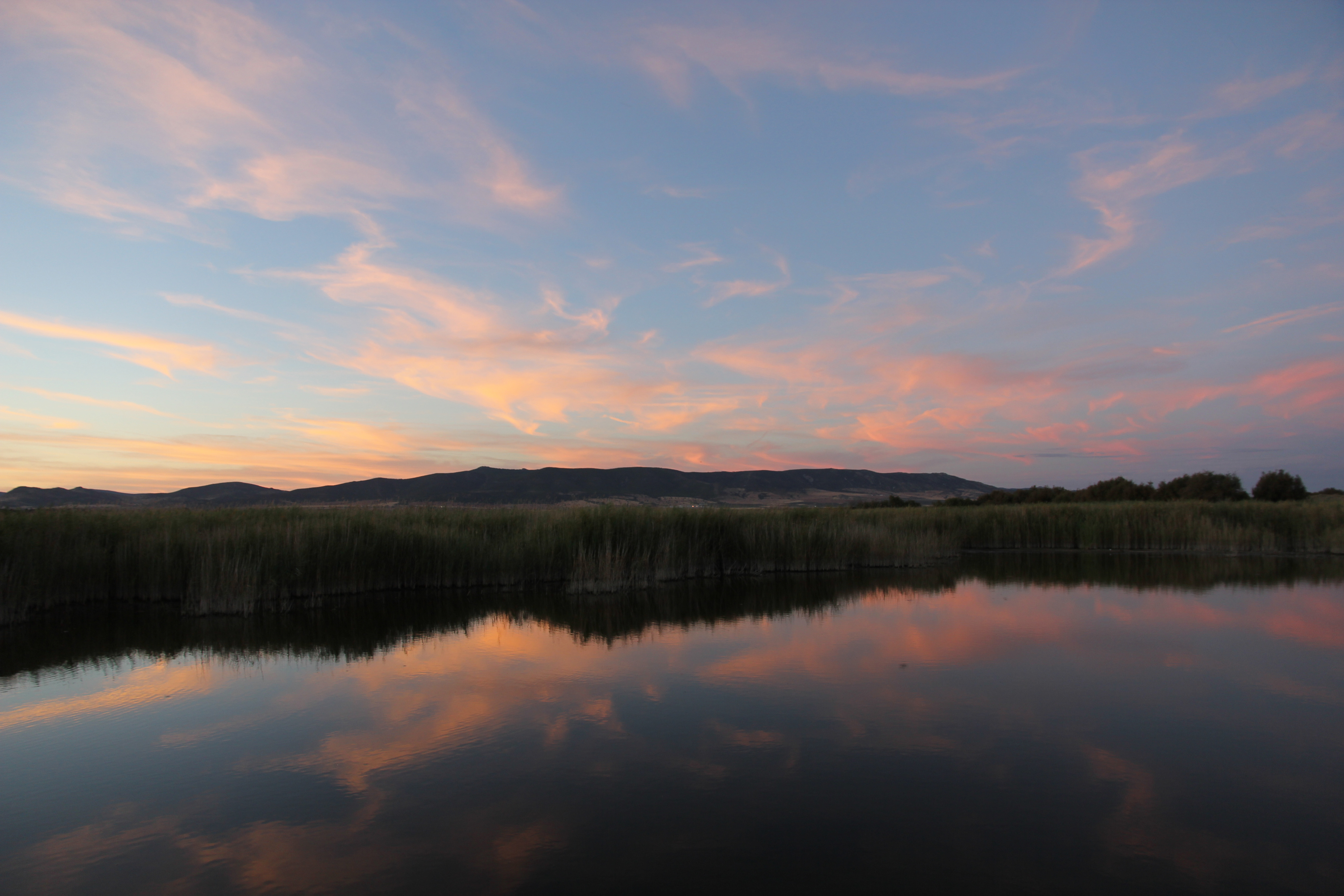
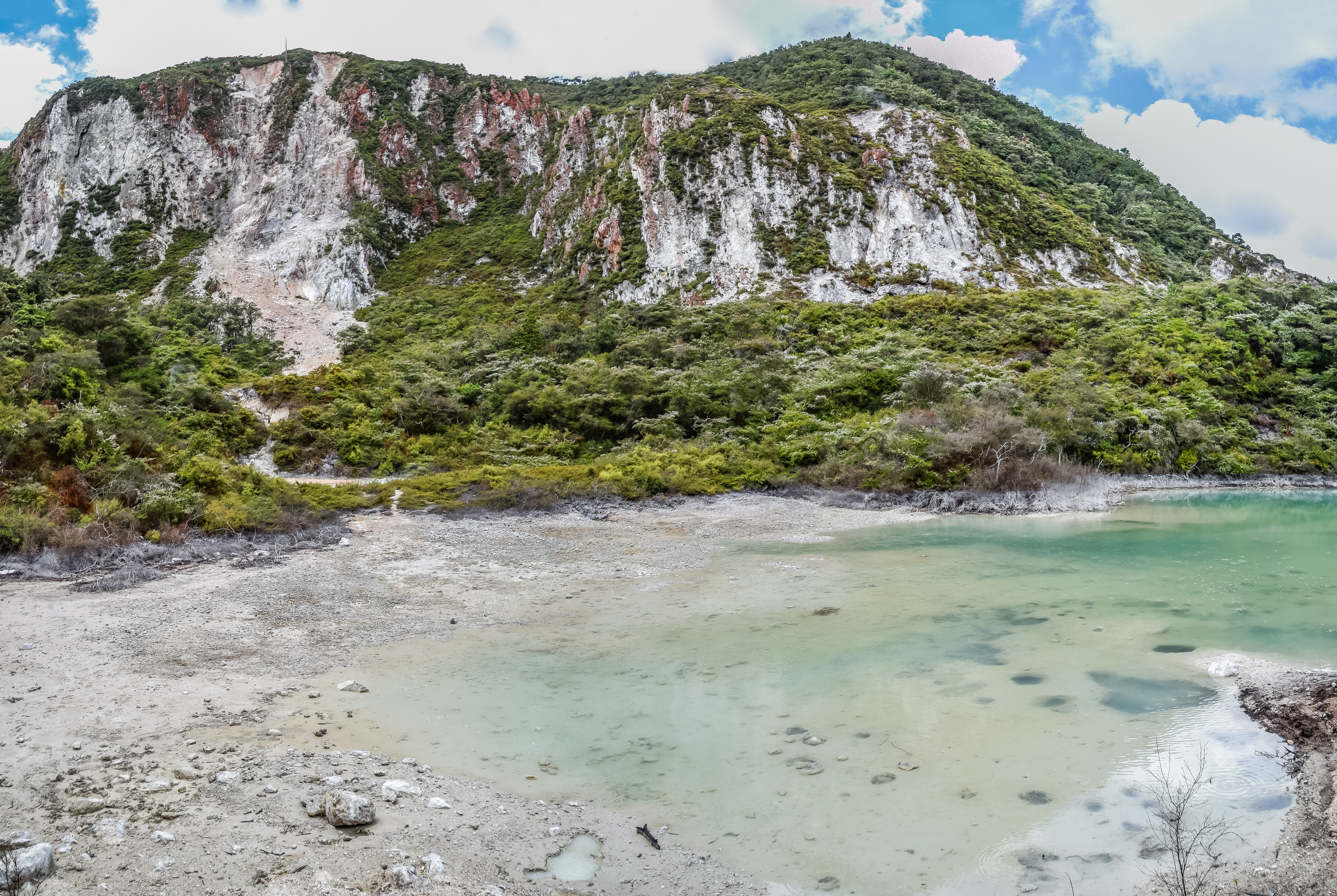
The Kota Formation hosted lacustrine and wetland settings, this last one being of carbonate type, having modern analoges such as the Tablas de Daimiel in Spain or Waiotapu in New Zealand

The Kota Formation represents mostly a Continental succession related to a continental rift basin, the Pranhita-Godavari Gondwana Basin of peninsular India. The associated facies of sandstone and limestones are likely related to playa-type lake, with nearby fluvial currents, part of low gradient hanging wall alluvial fans, being deposited on it´s margin. There have been records of freshwater lue green algal stromatolites and oncolites, suggested to be deposited on low energy and low bathymetry lacustrine settings. More recent works have proven the basin hosted in the Early Jurassic a freshwater carbonate wetland marked by the presence of limestones. The environmental model proposed include a depositional cycle marked by several facies types, A for the sublittoral zones of shallow water bodies, followed by palustrine environments, including surfaces with abundance of influence of both plants and animals, specially rhizobrecciation indicating active colonization of the margins by plants, having a similar deposition to the modern Las Tablas de Daimiel wetlands. Associated with the lacustrine facies have recovered microbial bioherms and lacustrine spring mounds, shallow ephemeral ponds with carbonated mud and Phyllopods, pedogenic calcrete under arid seasons and short-lived distributary channels. The depositional setting may have been partially sheltered from the input of siliciclastic materials, except on flooding seasons. Microbial biomats likely developed on shallow waters, while rhizoliths increased it´s presence of abandoned channel fills and pedogenic facies indicate drought seasons.

The carbonate layers with iron-rich grains and mudstones suggest a transition zone between a lake margin and wetland in a rift valley, in a marsh that experienced periodic influxes of iron-rich and barium-rich waters through faults. These waters briefly increased acidity but were neutralized by mixing with alkaline surface water, allowing carbonate formation. Iron-oxidizing microbes likely helped deposit iron oxides, cementing the sediment. During high water flow, these deposits were eroded and transported to deeper waters, forming iron-rich coatings. Thin sandy layers suggest that freshwater influxes occurred, forming carbonate bodies near water discharge points. As the water returned to being more alkaline, carbonates could form again, supporting freshwater Bivalvia, similar to modern geothermal areas of New Zealand.

== Fossil content ==
Color key: Taxon / Reclassified taxon / Taxon falsely reported as present / Dubious taxon or junior synonym / Ichnotaxon / Ootaxon / Morphotaxon	Notes; Uncertain or tentative taxa are in small text; ~~crossed out~~ taxa are discredited.

=== Ostracoda ===
Ostracods
Genus	Species	Location	Stratigraphic position	Material	Notes	Images
Clinocypris	C. sp.	Daroghapalli	Upper Member	Six carapaces	A freshwater ostracodan of the Family Pontocyprididae.	
Cypredea	C. sp.	Daroghapalli	Upper Member	Fourteen incomplete carapaces	A freshwater ostracodan of the Family Palaeocytheridae.	
Darwinula	D. cf.sarytirmenensis	Aklapalli; Daroghapalli; Kanchelli; Metpalli; Potepalli	Lower Member; Upper Member	More than 200 carapaces and valves	A freshwater ostracodan of the Family Darwinulidae. The most dominant genus locally and the main indicator of both fluvial and lacustrine settings	
Darwinula	D. kingi	Aklapalli; Daroghapalli; Kanchelli; Metpalli; Potepalli	Lower Member; Upper Member	Around 120 carapaces and valves	A freshwater ostracodan of the Family Darwinulidae.	
Darwinula	D. spp.	Daroghapalli	Lower Member; Upper Member	Nineteen Carapaces	A freshwater ostracodan of the Family Darwinulidae.	
Eucandona	E. sp.	Daroghapalli	Upper Member	Eight incomplete carapaces	A freshwater ostracodan of the Family Candoninae.	
Limnocythere	L. spp.	Daroghapalli	Lower Member	Three complete carapaces	A freshwater ostracodan of the family Limnocytheridae.	
Stenocypris	?S. sp.	Daroghapalli	Upper Member	Single incomplete carapace	A freshwater ostracodan of the family Cyprididae.	
Timiriasevia	T. digitalis	Daroghapalli	Lower Member	Twenty complete carapaces and thirty-six partly broken carapaces.	A freshwater ostracodan of the family Limnocytheridae.	

=== Phyllopoda ===
Phyllopods
Genus	Species	Location	Stratigraphic position	Material	Notes	Images
Estheriina	E. alibadadensis	Boraigudem limestone ridge; Kota limestone ridge; Lingal-Metpalli ridge	Lower Member; Upper Member	Valves	A freshwater clam shrimp of the family Estheriininae. The most abundant Estheriid in the region and the key element of the Estheriina biozone	
Estheriina	E. indijurassica	Boraigudem limestone ridge; Kota limestone ridge; Lingal-Metpalli ridge	Lower Member; Upper Member	Valves	A freshwater clam shrimp of the family Estheriininae.	
Estheriina	E. bullata	Boraigudem limestone ridge; Kota limestone ridge; Lingal-Metpalli ridge	Lower Member; Upper Member	Valves	A freshwater clam shrimp of the family Estheriininae.	
Estheriina	E. pranhitaensis	Boraigudem limestone ridge; Kota limestone ridge; Lingal-Metpalli ridge	Lower Member; Upper Member	Valves	A freshwater clam shrimp of the family Estheriininae.	
Lioestheria	L. kotaensis	Boraigudem limestone ridge; Kota limestone ridge; Lingal-Metpalli ridge	Lower Member; Upper Member	Valves	A freshwater clam shrimp of the family Lioestheriidae. The second key element of the Estheriina biozone	
Lioestheria	L. crustabundis	Boraigudem limestone ridge; Kota limestone ridge; Lingal-Metpalli ridge	Lower Member; Upper Member	Valves	A freshwater clam shrimp of the family Lioestheriidae.	
Lioestheria	L. ssp.	Kota limestone ridge	Lower Member	Valves	A freshwater clam shrimp of the family Lioestheriidae.	
Paleolimnadia	P. spp.	Kota limestone ridge	Lower Member; Upper Member	Valves	A freshwater clam shrimp of the family Estheriininae.	
Pseudeasmussiata	P. andhrapradeshia	Kadamba Village	Lower Member; Upper Member	Valves	A freshwater clam shrimp of the family Lioestheriidae.	

=== Insecta ===
Insects
Genus	Species	Location	Stratigraphic position	Material	Notes	Images
Archimesoblatta	A. shiva	Tasch outcrop K-2 bed 8	Upper Member	Right forewing tegmen	A mesoblattinid cockroach	
Blattodea indet.	Indeterminate	Tasch outcrop K-l, K-2, K-4 and K-5	Upper Member	Isolated wings	Indeterminate Blattodean remains	
Coleoptera indet.	Indeterminate	Tasch outcrop K-l, K-2 and K-5	Upper Member	Isolated wings	Indeterminate Beetle remains	
Coleopteron	C. sp.	Kota limestone ridge	Lower Member	Isolated wings	An Indeterminate Coleopteran.	
Ephemeroptera indet.	Indeterminate	Tasch outcrop K-l, K-2 and K-5	Upper Member	Isolated wings	Indeterminate Mayfly remains	
Hemiptera indet.	Indeterminate	Tasch outcrop K-l & K-2	Upper Member	Isolated wings	Indeterminate Hemipteran remains	
Heteroptera indet.	Indeterminate	Tasch outcrop K-l & K-2	Upper Member	Isolated wings	Indeterminate Heteropteran remains	
Neuroptera indet.	Indeterminate	Tasch outcrop K-l, K-2 and K-5	Upper Member	Isolated wings	Indeterminate Neuropteran remains	
Kotaphialtites	K. frankmortoni	Sirpur Taluka, Tasch's K1 outcrop bed 2(A)	Upper Member	MCZ 11909, Isolated wing	An ephialtitid hymenopteran.	
Protogryllus	P. lakshmi	Kota Formation outcrop K-2	Upper Member	MCZ 3046, Isolated wing	A protogryllid cricket	
Taschigatra	T. bharataja	Sirpur Taluka, Tasch's K1 outcrop bed 3(A)	Upper Member	No.2013(3013), part and counterpart of well preserved wing	A rhagionid dipteran.	
Taschigatra	T. tulyabhijana	Sirpur Taluka, Tasch's K1 outcrop bed 2(A)	Upper Member	No. 5034, well preserved wing	A rhagionid dipteran.	
Xyelula	X. alexandri	Kota Formation outcrop K-2	Upper Member	MCZ 11831, well preserved wing	A sepulcid hymenopteran.	

=== Fish ===
Fish
Taxon	Species	Location	Stratigraphic position	Material	Notes	Images
Indocoelacanthus	I. robustus	Boraigudem limestone ridge; Kota limestone ridge; Lingal-Metpalli ridge	Lower Member; Upper Member	ISI P. 39. Impression of the caudal fin; ISI P. 40. Nearly complete head and trunk squamation; ISI P. 41-45. Fragments of fin-rays; ISI P. 46. Neural arches, isolated scales and girdle elements	A robust freshwater coelacanth of the family Latimeriidae. Represents the largest member of the local freshwater fauna, measuring up to 70 cm.	
Ionoscopus	I. spp.	Boraigudem limestone ridge; Kota limestone ridge; Lingal-Metpalli ridge	Lower Member; Upper Member	Teeth	A freshwater neopterygian of the group Amiiformes.	
Lepidotes	L. deccanensis	Kota limestone ridge; Paikasigudem village	Lower Member; Upper Member	Complete Specimen; Isolated Remains	A freshwater neopterygian of the family Lepisosteiformes.	
Lepidotes	L. spp.	Kota limestone ridge; Paikasigudem village	Lower Member; Upper Member	Isolated remains	A freshwater neopterygian of the family Lepisosteiformes.	
Lonchidion	L. indicus	Paikasigudem village; Yamanpalli bonebed	Upper Member	GSI.TI.2, tooth; Isolated Teeth	A freshwater elasmobranch of the family Lonchidiidae.	
Paradapedium	P. egertoni	Boraigudem limestone ridge; Kota limestone ridge; Near Ankisha	Lower Member; Upper Member	BMNHP12146, Partial specimen; BMNHP12147, Almost complete specimen; BMNHP12148, Partial specimen; ISIP.32 Nearly complete specimen; ISIP.33 Nearly complete specimen; ISIP.34 Nearly complete specimen; ISIP.35 specimen lacking tail and head	A freshwater neopterygian of the family Dapediidae.	
Pholidophorus	P. kingi	Boraigudem limestone ridge; Kota limestone ridge; Paikasigudem village	Lower Member; Upper Member	Several complete and incomplete specimens	A freshwater neopterygian of the family Pholidophoridae.	
Pholidophorus	P. indicus	Boraigudem limestone ridge; Kota limestone ridge; Paikasigudem village	Lower Member; Upper Member	Several complete and incomplete specimens	A freshwater neopterygian of the family Pholidophoridae.	
Polyacrodus	P.? sp.	Paikasigudem village	Upper Member	Tooth	A freshwater elasmobranch of the family Polyacrodontidae.	
Pycnodontidae	Indeterminate	Paikasigudem village	Upper Member	About 60 specimens of Pharyngeal Teeth, including GSITL3-6	A freshwater neopterygian of the family Pycnodontidae, originally classified as Perciformes, yet suggested to be very similar to the Cretaceous pycnodont Stephanodus.	
Semionotiformes	Indeterminate	Paikasigudem village; Kota limestone ridge; Lingal-Metpalli ridge	Lower Member; Upper Member	Teeth	A freshwater neopterygian of the family Semionotiformes.	
Tetragonolepis	T. oldhami	Kota limestone ridge; Lingal-Metpalli ridge	Lower Member; Upper Member	GSI2145, an impression including most of the body; ISP36, fragment of trunk and skull; ISP37, nearly complete specimen	A freshwater neopterygian of the family Dapediidae.	

=== Amphibia ===
Amphibians
Taxon	Species	Location	Stratigraphic position	Material	Notes	Images
Anura indet.	Indeterminate	Paikasigudem village	Upper Member	GSI.TL.19, Mandible; GSI.TL.20, right illium	Indeterminate frog remains, originally referred to Pelobatidae due to be compared with younger Creteaceous Indian frog material	
Caudata indet.	Indeterminate	Paikasigudem village	Upper Member	GSI.TI.10, mandible with one teeth; GSI.TI.16, fragment of mandible; GSI.TI.17, mandible with 4 teeth	Indeterminate caudatan remains, originally referred to Sirenidae due to be compared with younger Creteaceous sirenid material	

=== Mammaliaforms ===
Mammaliaforms
Taxon	Species	Location	Stratigraphic position	Material	Notes	Images
Australosphenida indet.	Indeterminate	Paikasigudem village	Upper Member	Isolated lower molar	A mammal of the group Australosphenida, resembling the south american genus Asfaltomylos	
Dyskritodon?	D.? indicus	Paikasigudem village	Upper Member	VPL/JU/KM/13, lower left molar	A dubious mammal of the group Eutriconodonta. This Genus is known from the Early Cretaceous of Morocco, what has been used to suggest a minimum Berrasian age for the Upper Kota Formation	
Gondtherium	G. dattai	Paikasigudem village	Upper Member	VPL/JU/KM 12 right lower molar	A mammal of the family Docodontidae	
Indotherium	I. pranhitai	5 km west of Yamanapalli	Lower Member	GSI20795, right upper molar	A mammaliform of the family Morganucodontidae. Includes the informally named "Indozostrodon simpsoni".	
Indobaatar	I. zofiae	Paikasigudem village	Upper Member	VPL/JU/KM/20, a left upper premolar	A mammal described as an eobaatarid multituberculate, but this interpretation has been challenged.	
Kotatherium	K. haldanei	5 km west of Yamanapalli	Lower Member	GSI19634, right upper molar	A mammaliform of the family Kuehneotheriidae	
Nakunodon	N. paikasiensis	Paikasigudem village	Upper Member	GSI.SR/PAL/12, right upper molar	A mammal of the family Amphidontidae	
Paikasigudodon	P. yadagirii	Paikasigudem village	Upper Member	VPL/JU/KM/10, right upper molar	A mammaliaform of the family Morganucodontidae, originally known as "Kotatherium yadagirii"	
Trishulotherium	T. kotaensis	Paikasigudem village	Upper Member	GSISR/PAL/10, left lower molar	A mammal of the order Symmetrodonta	

=== Lepidosauromorpha ===
Lepidosauromorphs
Taxon	Species	Location	Stratigraphic position	Material	Notes	Images
Bharatagama	B. rebbanensis	Paikasigudem village	Upper Member	VPL/JU/KR 66, dentary; VPL/JU/KR 88, anterior region of a left maxilla; VPL/JU/KR 91, left maxilla; VPL/JU/KR 90-92, posterior ends of right maxillae; VPL/JU/KR 67-80-103, anterior symphysial region; JU/KR 79, 98, 100, dentaries mid-region; VPL/JU/KR 69, 81-84, 87, dentary with hatchling dentition; VPL/JU/KR 68, 85-86, dentary; VPL/JU/KR 70, 71, 76,78, 93, 94, 97, 104, 105, dentary	A lepidosauromorph originally described as an Iguanian lizard. May actually be a sphenodontian rather than a lizard.	
Godavarisaurus	G. lateefi	Gorlapalli village; Paikasigudem village	Upper Member	VP4Ju/KR47, a partial right dentary; VP4Ju/KR44, 51, 52, right maxilla; VP4Ju/KR40, 41, 43, 49, 50, left maxilla; VP4Ju/KR37, 48, 65, right dentary; VP4Ju/KR39, fragment of left dentary; VP4Ju/KR46, left palatine	A small sphenodontian, with a skull estimated to measure less than 20 mm	
Paikasisaurus	P. indicus	Paikasigudem village	Upper Member	GSI.TI.14, left dentary with teeth; GSI.TI.15, left dentary with one tooth	An indeterminate and dubious lepidosauromorph, originally suggested to be a varanoid lizard	
Rebbanasaurus	R. jaini	Paikasigudem village	Upper Member	About 50 specimens, including premaxillae, maxillae, dentaries, and a palatine	A small sphenodont	
Squamata? indet.	Indeterminate	Paikasigudem village	Upper Member	VPL/JU/KR 62, fragmentary right maxilla; VPL/JU/KR 61, partial maxilla	Distinct from Bharatagama rebbanensis; may include material formerly assigned to the dubious Kota squamate Paikasisaurus indicus. (Note: It cannot be determined which of the two Kota squamate forms, if either, the holotype of Paikasisaurus indicus pertains to.)	
Sphenodontidae indet.	Indeterminate	Paikasigudem village	Upper Member	GSI.TI.8-12, 17, maxilla	Indeterminate Sphenodontidae remains	

=== Testudinata ===
Turtles
Taxon	Species	Location	Stratigraphic position	Material	Notes	Images
Indochelys	I. spatulata	3 km NNE of Kistapur village, Kota; Near Kota village, north of Sironcha	Upper Member	GSI 20380, a partial shell; ISI R176, a partial shell; ISI R177, the anterior half of a shell	Mesochelydian stem-turtle, suggested to be related with Condorchelys	
Testudines indet.	Indeterminate	1 km south of Bodepalli	Lower Member	Carapace fragments	Indeterminate turtle remains	

=== Crocodylomorpha ===
Atoposaurid crocodiles are known from the unit, yet is not clear from what locality.

Crocodylomorpha
Taxon	Species	Location	Stratigraphic position	Material	Notes	Images
Crocodylomorpha indet.	Indeterminate	1 km south of Bodepalli	Lower Member	Maxillae, dentaries, teeth	Indeterminate crocodylomorph remains, previously mixed with thyreophoran material and part of the chimaeric "Andhrasaurus"	
Teleosauridae? indet.	Indeterminate	Kota limestone ridge	Lower Member	Dermal scutes, with a femur and some fragments of other bones	Indeterminate material referred to crocodylomorphs similar to Teleosaurus	

=== Pterosauria ===
Pterosaurs
Taxon	Species	Location	Stratigraphic position	Material	Notes	Images
Campylognathoides	C. indicus	Kota limestone ridge	Lower Member	ISI R38, holotype, fragment of skull and upper jaw	The holotype of Campylognathoides indicus, a pair of premaxillae, may represent a fish rather than a pterosaur.	
Pterosauria indet.	Indeterminate	Boraigudem; Chitur	Lower Member	GSI17868, radius and ulna, wing metacarpal, first wing-phalanx and a clawed toe; ISIR49. fragment displaying dissociated bones from post-cranial region	Indeterminate pterosaur remains	

=== Dinosaurs ===
Indeterminate ankylosaurian remains have been unearthed in the Kota Formation.

Dinosaurs
Genus	Species	Location	Stratigraphic position	Material	Notes	Images
"Andhrasaurus"	"A. indicus"	1 km south of Bodepalli	Lower Member	Sacral vertebra, vertebral centra, dorsal vertebrae, caudal vertebrae, parts of scapula and ilium, osteoderms	A chimaera of thyreophoran postcranial material and Crocodylomorph skull pieces. The armor was later suggested to be Ankylosauria indet. And other later works pointed out it likely belongs to an indeterminate basal thyreophoran.	
Barapasaurus	B. tagorei	North of Krishnapur; Pochampalli village	Lower Member	Roughly 300 bones, representing the disarticulated remains of at least six individuals	A sauropod dinosaur, either a Eusauropoda or more likely a Gravisauria. Represents the best-known Early Jurassic sauropod	Reconstruction
Breviparopus?	cf.B. taghbaloutensis	Saligaon Village	Lower Member	Footprints	Sauropod Tracks	
Carnosauria indet.	Indeterminate	Yamanapalli bonebed	Lower Member	Isolated Teeth	Found in the same bonebed as Kotasaurus, referred to as 'carnosaur predators'	
Dandakosaurus	D. indicus	Yamanpalli bonebed	Lower Member	Lateral tooth, proximal pubis, ischium, Dorsal vertebra, proximal caudal vertebra (Likely of Kotasaurus)	A chimaera of large theropod bones, including Pubis, ischium, and tooth, probably belonging to a carnosaur, and sauropod bones (two Kotasaurus vertebrae)	Speculative reconstruction
Dromaeosauridae? indet.	Indeterminate	Paikasigudem village	Upper Member	Isolated Teeth	Five distinct morphotypes have been identified, mostly resemble coelurosaurs or dromaeosauroids.	
Eubrontes	E. giganteus	Saligaon Village	Lower Member	Footprints	Theropod Tracks of the ichnofamily Eubrontidae.	Example of track of the same Ichnogenus
"Hypsilophodontid" indet.	Indeterminate	Gorlapalli Village	Upper Member	Isolated Tooth	Identified originally as a member of Hypsilophodontidae, probably represents a tooth of a basal neornithischian.	
Kayentapus	K. hopii	Saligaon Village	Lower Member	Footprints	Theropod Tracks of the ichnofamily Grallatoridae	
Kotasaurus	K. yamanpalliensis	Yamanpalli bonebed	Lower Member	Disarticulated remains of at least 12 individuals	A basal sauropod	Mounted esqueleton
Ornithischia indet.	Indeterminate	1 km south of Bodepalli; Paikasigudem village	Lower Member; Upper Member	End of left humerus; Isolated Teeth	Indeterminate ornithischian material. Among the teeth, at least five distinct morphotypes have been identified.	
Richardoestesia?	R.? spp.	Paikasigudem village	Upper Member	Isolated Teeth	Teeth similar to those of the problematic taxon Richardoestesia, of supposed coelurosaur affinities	
Sauropoda indet.	Indeterminate	Yamanpalli bonebed	Lower Member	Isolated Teeth	Found in the same bonebed as Kotasaurus, resembles Amygdalodon.	
Thyreophora indet.	Indeterminate	Paikasigudem village	Upper Member	Scute and associated fragmentary limb bones.	Indeterminate scelidosaurid material.	

=== Megaflora ===
Genus	Species	Location	Stratigraphic position	Material	Notes	Images
Agathoxylon	A. kotaense	Near Kota village	Lower Member	Fossil wood	Affinities with Araucariaceae or Cheirolepidiaceae inside Pinales.	
Agathoxylon	A. chandrapurensis	Near Kota village	Lower Member	Fossil wood	Affinities with Araucariaceae or Cheirolepidiaceae inside Pinales.	
Agathoxylon	A. santacruzense	Near Kota village	Lower Member	Fossil wood	Affinities with Araucariaceae or Cheirolepidiaceae inside Pinales.	
Agathoxylon	A. pranhitaensis	Near Kota village	Lower Member	Fossil wood	Affinities with Araucariaceae or Cheirolepidiaceae inside Pinales.	
Agathoxylon	A. santalense	Near Kota village	Lower Member	Fossil wood	Affinities with Araucariaceae or Cheirolepidiaceae inside Pinales.	
Agathoxylon	A. spp.	Bodepalli; Near Kota village; Paikasigudem village	Lower Member; Upper Member	Fossil wood	Affinities with Araucariaceae or Cheirolepidiaceae inside Pinales.	
Araucarites	A. minutus	Dronadula	Lower Member	Branched shoots	Affinities with Araucariaceae inside Pinales.	
Araucarites	A. sp.	Near Kota village	Lower Member	Branched shoots	Affinities with Araucariaceae inside Pinales.	
Brachyphyllum	B. expansum	Near Kota village	Lower Member	Branched shoots	Affinities with Araucariaceae or Cheirolepidiaceae inside Pinales.	
Elatocladus	E. conferta	Near Kota village	Lower Member	Branched shoots	Affinities with Cupressaceae inside Pinales.	
Elatocladus	E. tenerrimus	Near Kota village	Lower Member	Branched shoots	Affinities with Cupressaceae inside Pinales.	
Elatocladus	E. jabalpurensis	Near Kota village	Lower Member	Branched shoots	Affinities with Cupressaceae inside Pinales.	
Elatocladus	E. plana	Near Kota village	Lower Member	Branched shoots	Affinities with Cupressaceae inside Pinales.	
Elatocladus	E. sp.	Near Kota village	Lower Member	Branched shoots	Affinities with Cupressaceae inside Pinales.	
Cladophlebis	C. denticulata	Boraigudem; Chitur; Near Kota village	Lower Member	Isolated fronds	Affinities with Osmundaceae in the Osmundales.	Cladophlebis denticulata illustration
Cladophlebis	C. indica	Boraigudem; Chitur; Near Kota village	Lower Member	Isolated fronds	Affinities with Osmundaceae in the Osmundales	Cladophlebis denticulata illustration
Cladophlebis	C. reversa	Boraigudem; Chitur; Near Kota village	Lower Member	Isolated fronds	Affinities with Osmundaceae in the Osmundales	Cladophlebis denticulata illustration
Cladophlebis	C. spp.	Boraigudem; Chitur; Near Kota village	Lower Member	Isolated fronds	Affinities with Osmundaceae in the Osmundales	Cladophlebis denticulata illustration
Circoporoxylon	C. kotaense	Near Kota village	Lower Member	Fossil wood	Affinities with Podocarpaceae inside Pinales.	
Coniopteris	C. hymenophylloides	Boraigudem; Chitur; Near Kota village	Lower Member	Isolated fronds	Affinities with Polypodiales in the Polypodiidae. Common cosmopolitan Mesozoic fern genus. Recent research has reinterpreted it a stem group of the Polypodiales (closely related to the extant genera Dennstaedtia, Lindsaea, and Odontosoria)	Coniopteris specimen
Coniopteris	C. sp.	Near Kota village	Lower Member	Isolated fronds	Affinities with Polypodiales in the Polypodiidae.	Coniopteris specimen
Cupressinoxylon	C. kotaense	Near Kota village	Lower Member	Fossil wood	Affinities with Cupressaceae inside Pinales.	
Dictyozamites	D. falcatus	Near Kota village	Lower Member	Leaflets	Affinities with Williamsoniaceae in the Bennettitales.	
Dictyozamites	D. kotaense	Near Kota village	Lower Member	Leaflets	Affinities with Williamsoniaceae in the Bennettitales.	
Equisetum	E.rajmahalensis	Chitur village; Near Kota village	Lower Member; Upper Member	Isolated Stems	Affinities with Equisetaceae inside Equisetales.	Extant Equisetum arvense specimen
Ginkgoites	G. lobata	Near Kota village	Lower Member	Leafs	Affinities with Ginkgoaceae inside Ginkgoopsida.	Ginkgoites reconstruction
Ginkgoxylon	G. dixii	Near Kota village	Lower Member	Fossil wood	Affinities with Ginkgoaceae inside Ginkgoopsida.	
Hausmannia	H. cf. buchii	Near Kota village	Lower Member	Isolated pinnae	Affinities with Dipteridaceae in the Polypodiales.	Hausmannia specimen
Otozamites	O. vemavarmensis	Near Kota village	Lower Member	Leaflets	Affinities with Williamsoniaceae in the Bennettitales.	Otozamites specimen
Pagiophyllum	P. peregrinum	Near Kota village	Lower Member	Branched shoots	Affinities with Araucariaceae or Cheirolepidiaceae inside Pinales.	
Pagiophyllum	P. cf.peregrinum	Near Kota village	Lower Member	Branched shoots	Affinities with Araucariaceae or Cheirolepidiaceae inside Pinales.	
Pagiophyllum	P. spp.	Near Kota village	Lower Member	Branched shoots	Affinities with Araucariaceae or Cheirolepidiaceae inside Pinales.	
Pachypteris	P. indica	Near Kota village	Lower Member	Isolated pinnae	Affinities with Umkomasiaceae in the Pteridospermatophyta.	
Planoxylon	P. mahabalei	Near Kota village	Lower Member	Fossil wood	Affinities with Protopinaceae inside Pinales.	
Podocarpoxylon	P. chandrapurensis	Near Kota village	Lower Member	Fossil wood	Affinities with Podocarpaceae inside Pinales.	
Podocarpoxylon	P. chiturensis	Chitur village	Upper Member	Fossil wood	Affinities with Podocarpaceae inside Pinales.	
Podocarpoxylon	P. krauselii	Near Kota village	Lower Member	Fossil wood	Affinities with Podocarpaceae inside Pinales.	
Podocarpoxylon	P. rajmahalense	Near Kota village	Lower Member	Fossil wood	Affinities with Podocarpaceae inside Pinales.	
Podocarpoxylon	P. sewardii	Near Kota village	Lower Member	Fossil wood	Affinities with Podocarpaceae inside Pinales.	
Podocarpoxylon	P. sp.	Near Kota village	Lower Member	Fossil wood	Affinities with Podocarpaceae inside Pinales.	
Podozamites	P. sp.	Near Kota village	Lower Member	Leaflets	Broad conifer leaves	
Pseudoctenis	P. cf. fragilis	Near Kota village	Lower Member	Leaflets	Affinities with Cycadales in the Cycadopsida.	
Ptilophyllum	P. fissum	Boraigudem; Chitur; Near Kota village	Lower Member	Leaflets	Affinities with Williamsoniaceae in the Bennettitales.	
Ptilophyllum	P. acutifolium	Boraigudem; Chitur; Near Kota village	Lower Member	Leaflets	Affinities with Williamsoniaceae in the Bennettitales.	
Ptilophyllum	P. cutchense	Chitur village; Near Kota village	Lower Member; Upper Member	Leaflets	Affinities with Williamsoniaceae in the Bennettitales.	
Ptilophyllum	P. cf.sahnii	Near Kota village	Lower Member	Leaflets	Affinities with Williamsoniaceae in the Bennettitales.	
Ptilophyllum	P. cf.institacallum	Near Kota village	Lower Member	Leaflets	Affinities with Williamsoniaceae in the Bennettitales.	
Ptilophyllum	P. sp.	Near Kota village	Lower Member	Leaflets	Affinities with Williamsoniaceae in the Bennettitales.	
Protaxodioxylon	P. sahnii	Chitur village	Upper Member	Fossil wood	Affinities with Cupressaceae inside Pinales.	
Protaxodioxylon	P. liassicum	Near Kota village	Lower Member	Fossil wood	Affinities with Cupressaceae inside Pinales.	
Sphenopteris	S. kotaensis	Near Kota village	Lower Member	Isolated Fronds	Affinities with Dicksoniaceae in the Cyatheales.	
Taxaceoxylon	T. sahnii	Near Kota village	Lower Member	Fossil wood	Affinities with Cupressaceae inside Pinales.	
Taxaceoxylon	T. biradarii	Chitur village	Lower Member	Fossil wood	Affinities with Cupressaceae inside Pinales.	
Taxaceoxylon	T. antiquum	Near Kota village	Lower Member	Fossil wood	Affinities with Cupressaceae inside Pinales.	
Taxaceoxylon	T. sp.	Near Kota village	Upper Member	Fossil wood	Affinities with Cupressaceae inside Pinales.	
Torreyites	T. constricte	Chitur village	Upper Member	Branched shoots		Extant Torreya specimen

== See also ==
- List of dinosaur-bearing rock formations
- Hanson Formation, Antarctica
- Mawson Formation, Antarctica
- Cañadón Asfalto Formation, Argentina
- Los Molles Formation, Argentina
- Evergreen Formation, Australia
- Cattamarra Coal Measures, Australia
- Blue Lias, England
- Charmouth Mudstone Formation, England
- Calcare di Sogno, Italy
- Marne di Monte Serrone, Italy
- Moltrasio Formation, Italy
- Rotzo Formation, Italy
- Saltrio Formation, Italy
- Kandreho Formation, Madagascar
- Budoš Limestone, Montenegro
- Aganane Formation, Morocco
- Azilal Formation, Morocco
- Tafraout Group, Morocco
- Borucice Formation, Poland
- Ciechocinek Formation, Poland
- Drzewica Formation, Poland
- Zagaje Formation, Poland
- Coimbra Formation, Portugal
- Podpeč Limestone, Slovenia
- Clarens Formation, South Africa
- Elliot Formation, South Africa
- El Pedregal Formation, Spain
