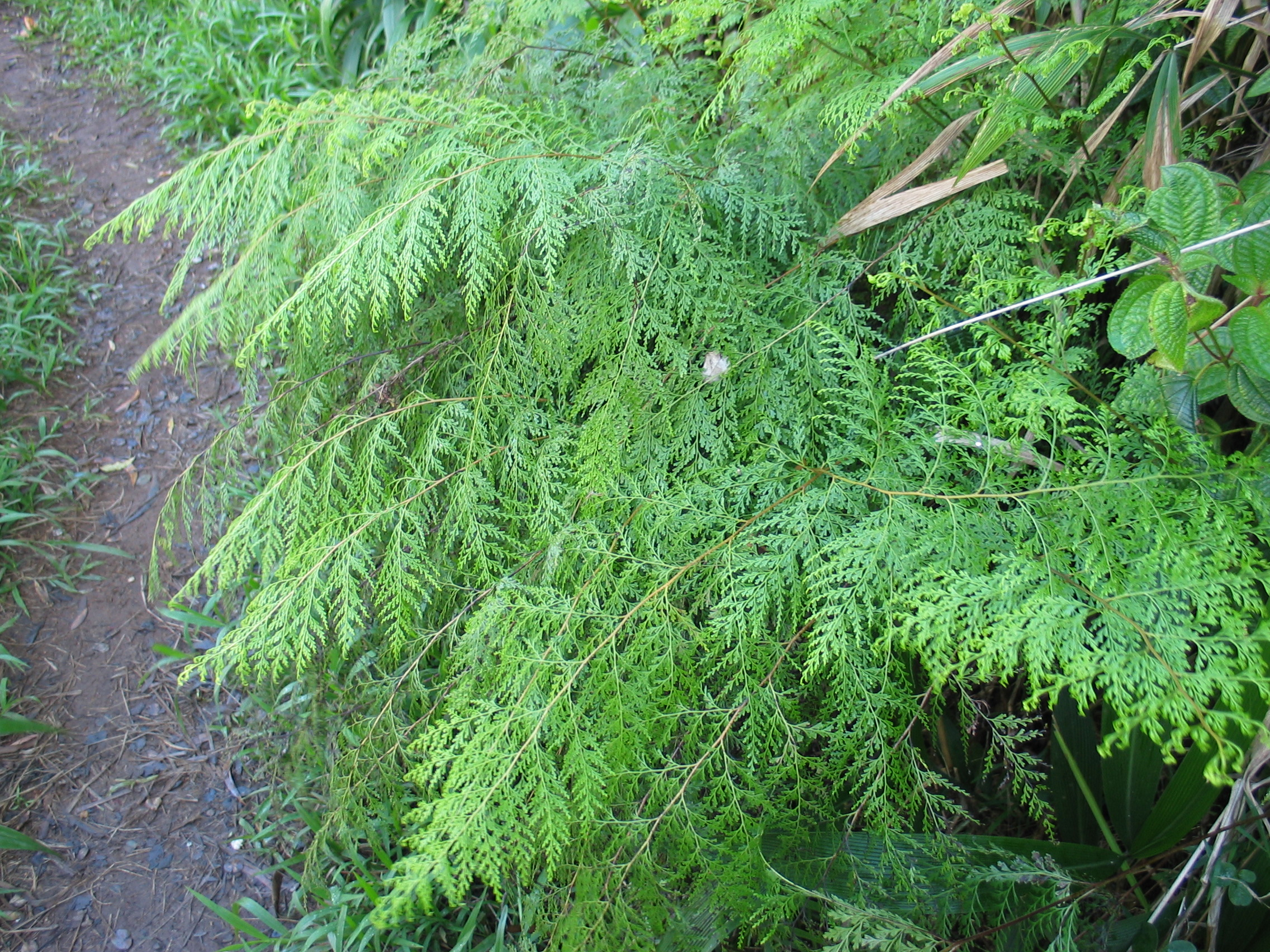

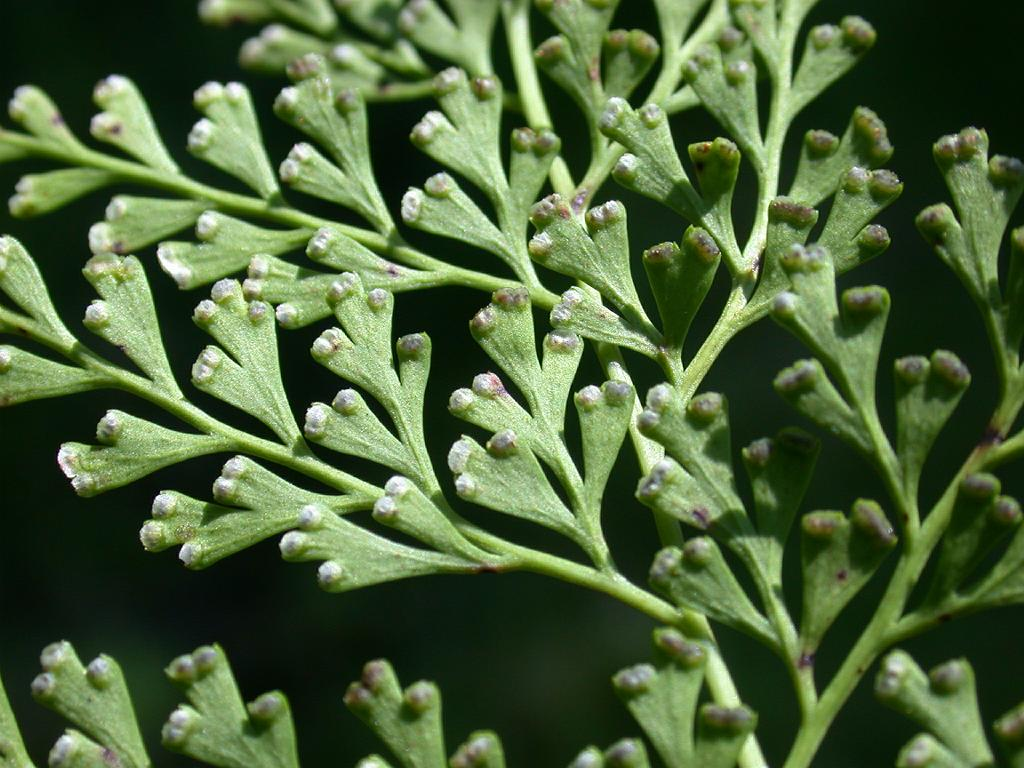

Scientific classification
- Kingdom: Plantae
- Clade: Tracheophytes
- Division: Polypodiophyta
- Class: Polypodiopsida
- Order: Polypodiales
- Family: Lindsaeaceae
- Genus: Odontosoria
- Species: O. chinensis

Binomial name
- Odontosoria chinensis (L.) J.Sm.

Synonyms
- Adiantum chinense (L.) Burm.f.; Davallia chinensis (L.) Sm.; Lindsaea chinensis (L.) A.Braun & C.D.Bouché; Microlepia chinensis (L.) Mett.; Sphenomeris chinensis (L.) Maxon; Stenoloma chinense (L.) Bedd.; Trichomanes chinense L.

= Odontosoria chinensis =

Species of fern

Odontosoria chinensis is a fern in the family Lindsaeaceae. Commonly called lace fern (Hawaiian: pala'ā, palae, or palapala'ā), it is native from India to Hawai'i, and south to Sumatra, Borneo and the Philippines, as well as other parts of the tropics and sub-tropics. It is commonly found in forest openings and disturbed areas such as landslides, along trails or roads. It grows in moist, shady areas from sea level to an elevation of 4,000 feet.

== Subspecies ==
As of November 2019, two subspecies were recognized:

- Odontosoria chinensis ssp. chinensis
- Odontosoria chinensis ssp. tenuifolia (Lam.) Fraser-Jenk. & Kandel

Odontosoria biflora from the Philippines has also been treated as a subspecies of this species.

== Uses ==
Hawaiians made red-brown dye from the old fronds. Pala'ā was used to treat "female ailments". It is made into a lei using the hili, or hilo technique - a braiding or plaiting method with only one type of plant material. It is also made into haku with other plants using the wili or winding method and a backing.

== See also ==
- Diplazium esculentum
