= Xyropteris =

Scientific classification
- Kingdom: Plantae
- Clade: Tracheophytes
- Division: Polypodiophyta
- Class: Polypodiopsida
- Order: Polypodiales
- Family: Lindsaeaceae
- Genus: Xyropteris; K.U.Kramer
- Species: X. stortii

Binomial name
- Xyropteris stortii (Alderw.) K.U.Kramer

Synonyms
- Lindsaea stortii (Alderw.) Christenh.; Schizolegnia stortii (Alderw.) Alston; Schizoloma stortii Alderw.; Tapeinidium bartlettii Copel.

Genus of ferns

Xyropteris is a genus of ferns in the family Lindsaeaceae. It has a single described species, Xyropteris stortii, native to Sumatra and Borneo. Some sources do not recognize the genus Xyropteris, placing the species in Lindsaea as Lindsaea stortii.
