= Gangapur Formation =

Geological formation in India

- Stratigraphic range: Early Cretaceous, Valanginian to Aptian
- Type: Geological formation
- Overlies: Unconformity with the Kota Formation

Location
- Coordinates: 19.16°N 79.26°E
- Region: Telangana
- Country: India
- Extent: Pranhita-Godavari Basin

Type section
- Named for: Gangapur Village
- Gangapur Formation (India)

The Gangapur Formation is a geological formation in Telangana, India. The Gangapur formation is Early Cretaceous in age. It forms a part of the Pranhita–Godavari Basin and overlies the Jurassic Kota Formation. The outcrops near the Gangapur village was first described in 1881 as the Gangapur beds. In 1969, the area was instituted as the Gangapur Formation. It was also determined that the Gangapur Formation extends from north of Nowgaon (Lat. 19°20’N; Long. 79°24’E) to the west of Gangapur (Lat. 19°16’N; Long. 79°26’E) and in the east up to Dharmaram and Paikasigudem. Fossils of plants have been found in large quantities in the formation. Some fragmentary dinosaur bones are also reported from the formation.

== Stratigraphy ==
The Gangapur Formation was laid down sometime in the Early Cretaceous due to renewed rift activity. The rocks of the formation are composed of coarse ferruginous sandstone interrupted with pebble bands succeeded by an alternating sequence of sandstones and mudstones or silty mudstone. Both the Gangapur Formation and the Chikiala Formation overlie the Kota formation however their exact relationships are uncertain. This uncertainty is partly due to the lack of fossils from the Chikiala Formation. It is possible that the Gangapur Formation is older than the Chikiala Formation or that they are both of the same age.

== Fossil content ==
Color key: Taxon / Reclassified taxon / Taxon falsely reported as present / Dubious taxon or junior synonym / Ichnotaxon / Ootaxon / Morphotaxon

Notes
Uncertain or tentative taxa are in small text
~~crossed out~~ taxa are discredited.

=== Osteichthyes ===
Genus	Species	Location	Stratigraphic position	Material	Notes	Images
Caturidae	Indeterminate			VPL/JU/KF/126-128, teeth	The teeth are said to be Caturus-like.	
Palaeoniscidae	Indeterminate			VPL/JU/KF/104-105, teeth	The teeth are said to be Gyrolepis-like.	

=== Dinosaurs ===
Genus	Species	Location	Stratigraphic position	Material	Notes	Images
Dinosauria	Indeterminate			"Fragmentary dinosaur bones"	Indeterminate Dinosaurs.	

=== Megaflora ===
Plant megafossils are common in the Gangapur Formation, dominated by the Coniferales.

Genus	Species	Location	Stratigraphic position	Material	Notes	Images
Taeniopteris	T. kutchensis	Ralpet, Rampur and Peddavagu.		Leaves.	Cycad also known from the Bhuj Formation.	
Taeniopteris	T. spatulata	Rampur, Butarmal Nala and Peddavagu.		Leaves	Cycad also known from the Rajmahal Traps.	
Taeniopteris	T. sp.	Rampur, Nowgaon and Peddavagu.		Leaves	Cycad similar to T.sp from Antarctica.	
Cycadites	C.sp.				Cycad.	
Ptilophyllum	P. cutchense	Rampur and Nowgaon.		Leaves.	Bennettitales.	
Ptilophyllum	P. acutifolium	Rampur and Peddavagu.		Leaves.	Bennettitales. Resembles P. acutifolium from the Raghavapuram Formation.	
Ptilophyllum	P. rarinervis	Butarmal Nala.		Leaves.	Bennettitales. Originally referred to as Otozamites rarinervis.	
Ptilophyllum	cf. P. distans	Butarmal Nala.		Leaves.	Bennettitales. Resembles P. distans.	
Ptilophyllum	P. distans	Butarmal Nala.		Leaves.	Bennettitales.	
?Anomozamites	?A. sp	Nowgaon.		Leaves.	Bennettitales.	
Harrisiophyllum	H. lanceolatus	Rampur.			A gymnosperm	
Elatocladus	E. confertus	Ralpet, Rampur, Nowgaon, Butarmal Nala and Peddavagu.		Leaves.	Coniferales. Very common in the Gangapur Formation.	
Elatocladus	E. sehoraensis	Ralpet and Butarmal Nala.		Leaves.	Coniferales. Also known from the Jabalpur Formation.	
Elatocladus	cf. E. bosei	Ralpet and Butarmal Nala.		Leaves.	Coniferales. Comparable to E. bosei of the Jabalpur Formation.	
Elatocladus	E. andhrensis	Ralpet, Nowgaon and Peddavagu.		Leaves.	Coniferales. Specimens belonging to this species were also registered as E. confertus and E. heterophylla.	
Elatocladus	E. sp	Nowgaon and Peddavagu.		Leaves.	Coniferales.	
Elatocladus	E. kingianus	Cave Temple.		Leaves.	Coniferales.	
Pagiophyllum	P. marwarensis	Rampur.		Leaves.	Coniferales. Also known from the Jabalpur Formation.	
Pagiophyllum	P. rewaensis	Peddavagu.		Leaves.	Coniferales. Also known from the Jabalpur Formation.	
?Cladophlebis	?C. sp	Peddavagu.		Leaves.	Fern.	
Gleichenia	G. nordenskioildii	Nowgaon.		Leaves.	Fern.	
?Gleichenia	G. sp	Nowgaon.		Leaves.	Fern.	
Coniferocaulon	C. sp.	Peddavagu and quarry north of the Cave Temple.		Leaves.	Coniferales. Also known from the Jabalpur Formation.	
Coniferocaulon	cf. C. rajmahalense	Peddavagu and quarry north of the Cave Temple.		Leaves.	Coniferales. Also known from the Jabalpur Formation.	

== See also ==
- List of dinosaur-bearing rock formations
  - List of stratigraphic units with indeterminate dinosaur fossils
