= Adiantum cuneatum =

Adiantum cuneatum can refer to:

- Adiantum cuneatum G.Forst., a synonym of Lindsaea trichomanoides Dryand.
- Adiantum cuneatum Langsd. & Fisch., a synonym of Adiantum raddianum C.Presl
