= Tubho tea =

Ivatan herbal tea

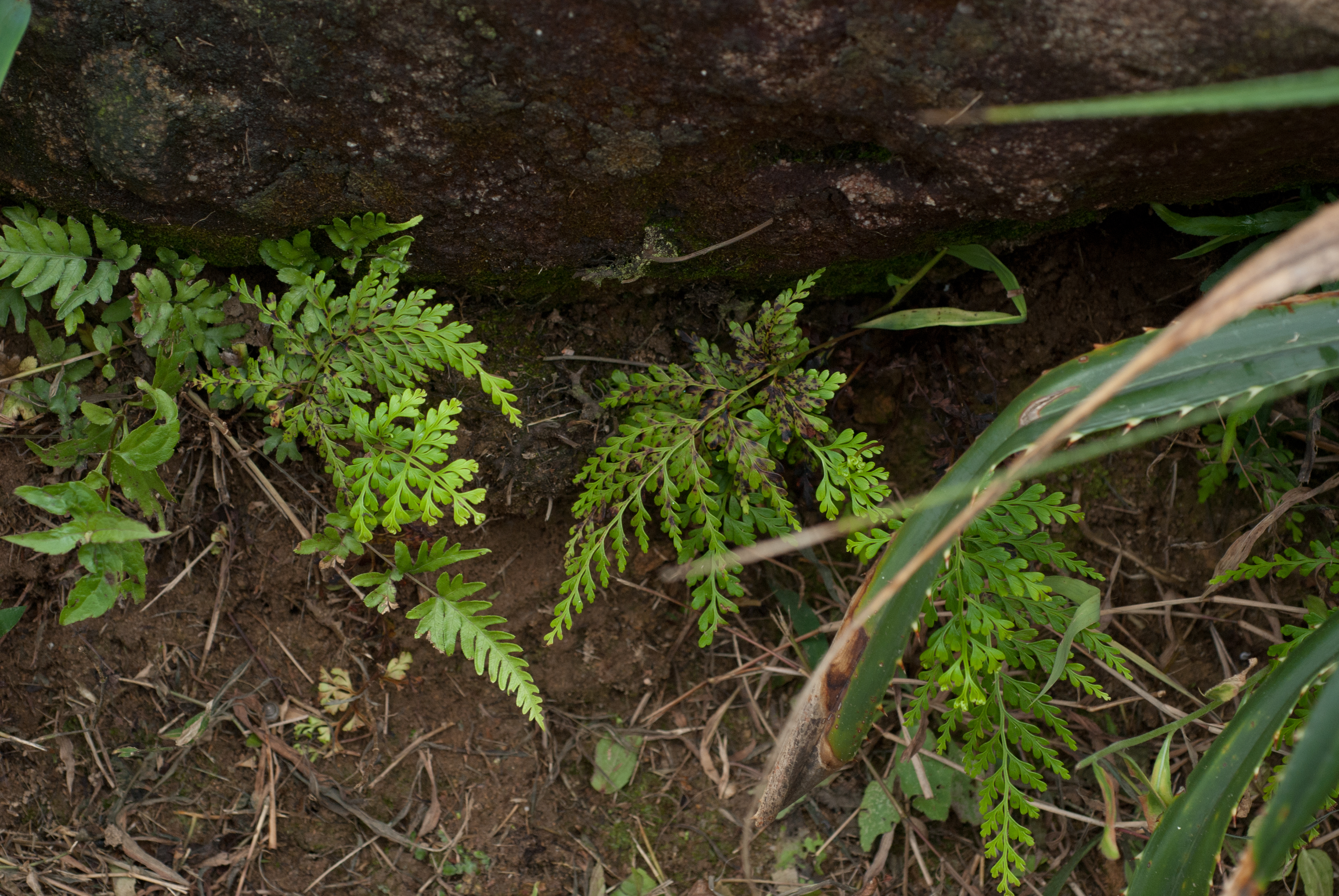
- Tubho fern in Taiwan
- Origin: Philippines
- Ingredients: Tubho fern

Tubho tea (sometimes spelled tubha), is a traditional herbal tea of the Ivatan people in the Philippines made from dried leaves of the tubho fern.

== Tubho fern ==
Tubho tea is made from the tubho fern, Odontosoria biflora, also known as Sphenomeris biflora and Sphenomeris chinensis subsp. biflora. It is native to Southeast China, Korea, Japan and its offshore islands, Taiwan, and the Philippines.

== Preparation ==
Tubho tea is not made from fresh fronds of the tubho, instead it is made from mature fronds which have already wilted and dried while still on the plant. They are preferred because they are less bitter. The dried fronds are boiled in water until the water turns dark brown. The leaves are then removed and it is served hot. The leaves may be reused, as long as they still turn the water dark brown when boiled. The tea is traditionally sweetened with brown sugar. However, it can also be consumed similar to other teas, like with cream, honey, or lemon. Some modern versions serve it iced. The taste of the tea is described as slightly bitter and nutty.

The Department of Science and Technology (DOST) has developed a powdered version of tubho tea which is made available in Sabtang town. The DOST plans to develop a method that would enable wider commercial production of tubho tea.

== Ivatan culture ==
Local Ivatan people claim that the tea is the secret to their longevity and has medicinal benefits. Tubho tea is not cultivated. It is harvested from wild plants in the Batanes Islands in small quantities, particularly in the southernmost islands of Sabtang. They are usually locally consumed or sold to tourists, though some restaurants in other parts of the Philippines serve it as part of their menus.

== See also ==
- Diplazium esculentum (pakô fern)
- Kapeng barako
