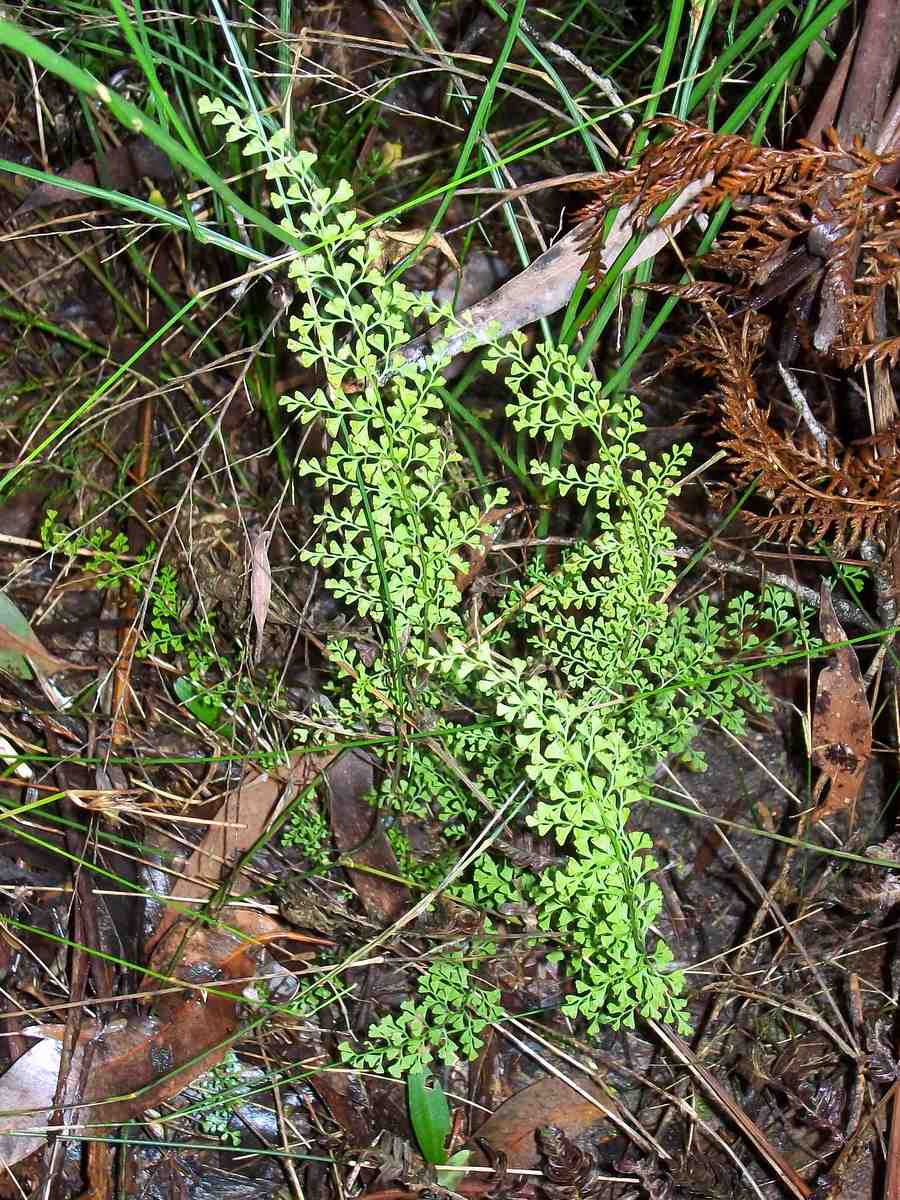
- Lacy wedge fern at Blue Mountains National Park, Australia

Scientific classification
- Kingdom: Plantae
- Clade: Tracheophytes
- Division: Polypodiophyta
- Class: Polypodiopsida
- Order: Polypodiales
- Family: Lindsaeaceae
- Genus: Lindsaea
- Species: L. microphylla

Binomial name
- Lindsaea microphylla Sw.

Synonyms
- Odontosoria microphylla (Sw.) J.Sm.; Sphenomeris microphylla (Sw.) Tardieu; Adiantum microphyllum (Sw.) Poir. nom. Illeg.; Schizoloma microphyllum (Sw.) Kuhn; Lindsaea microphylla Sw. var. microphylla; Stenoloma lindsayoides Fee; Lindsaya microphylla var. gracilescens orth. var. Domin; Lindsaea microphylla var. gracilescens Domin; Lindsaya microphylla orth. var. F.Muell.

= Lindsaea microphylla =

Species of fern

Lindsaea microphylla, known as the lacy wedge fern is a small plant found in eastern Australia. A delicate and attractive fern found growing along the edges of rainforest, as well as damp places in woodland and open eucalyptus forest.
