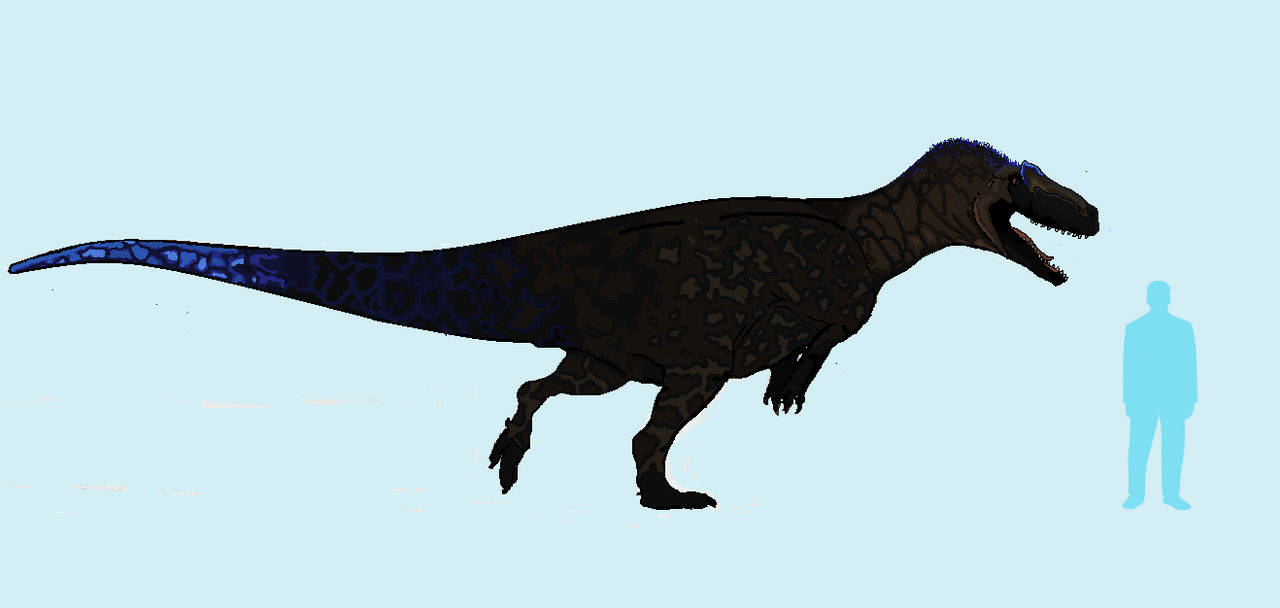
- Speculative life restoration of Dandakosaurus as a megalosauroid

Scientific classification
- Kingdom: Animalia
- Phylum: Chordata
- Class: Reptilia
- Clade: Dinosauria
- Clade: Saurischia
- Clade: Theropoda
- Clade: Averostra
- Genus: †Dandakosaurus; Yadagiri, 1982
- Species: †D. indicus

Binomial name
- †Dandakosaurus indicus Yadagiri, 1982

= Dandakosaurus =

Dandakosaurus Temporal range: Early Jurassic, Toarcian

Extinct genus of dinosaurs

Dandakosaurus (meaning "Dandakaranya lizard") is a dubious genus of theropod dinosaur from the Kota Formation, Andhra Pradesh, India. It lived 183 to 175 million years ago from the latest Pliensbachian to the late Toarcian stages of the Early Jurassic. Little is known about the genus, and some paleontologists consider it to be a nomen dubium.

== Discovery and naming ==
The holotype is partial proximal pubis, GSI 1/54Y/76, discovered in the Kota Formation of India between 1958 and 1961 and was described as an indeterminate carnosaur in 1962. Other material referred to the genus include dorsal vertebrae, caudal vertebrae, a tooth and a partial ischium. The type species, D. indicus, was named by Ponnala Yadagiri in 1982.

== Description ==
The tooth was described as being recurved and heavily compressed. The distal carina possessed small denticles. The carinae were positioned centrally and the tooth was subsymmetrical labial and distal profiles. The dorsal vertebrae lack pleurocoels and opisthocoelous. The caudal vertebrae bore depressions on the lateral sides. It was amphicoelous and had a keel on its ventral side. It is possible that the vertebrae belong to a sauropodomorph. The obturator fenestra of the pubis is absent, instead being an obturator notch. The pubis is unique in that it points ventrally, unlike the usual forward-facing condition seen in saurischians, giving it a mesopubic condition.

In 2016, Molina-Pérez and Larramendi estimated Dandakosaurus at 10 m (33 ft) in length and 2.3 t (2.5 short tons) in weight.

== Classification ==
Dandakosaurus is currently classified as Averostra incertae sedis, variously suggested to be a basal ceratosaur or basal tetanuran.

== See also ==
- Timeline of ceratosaur research
