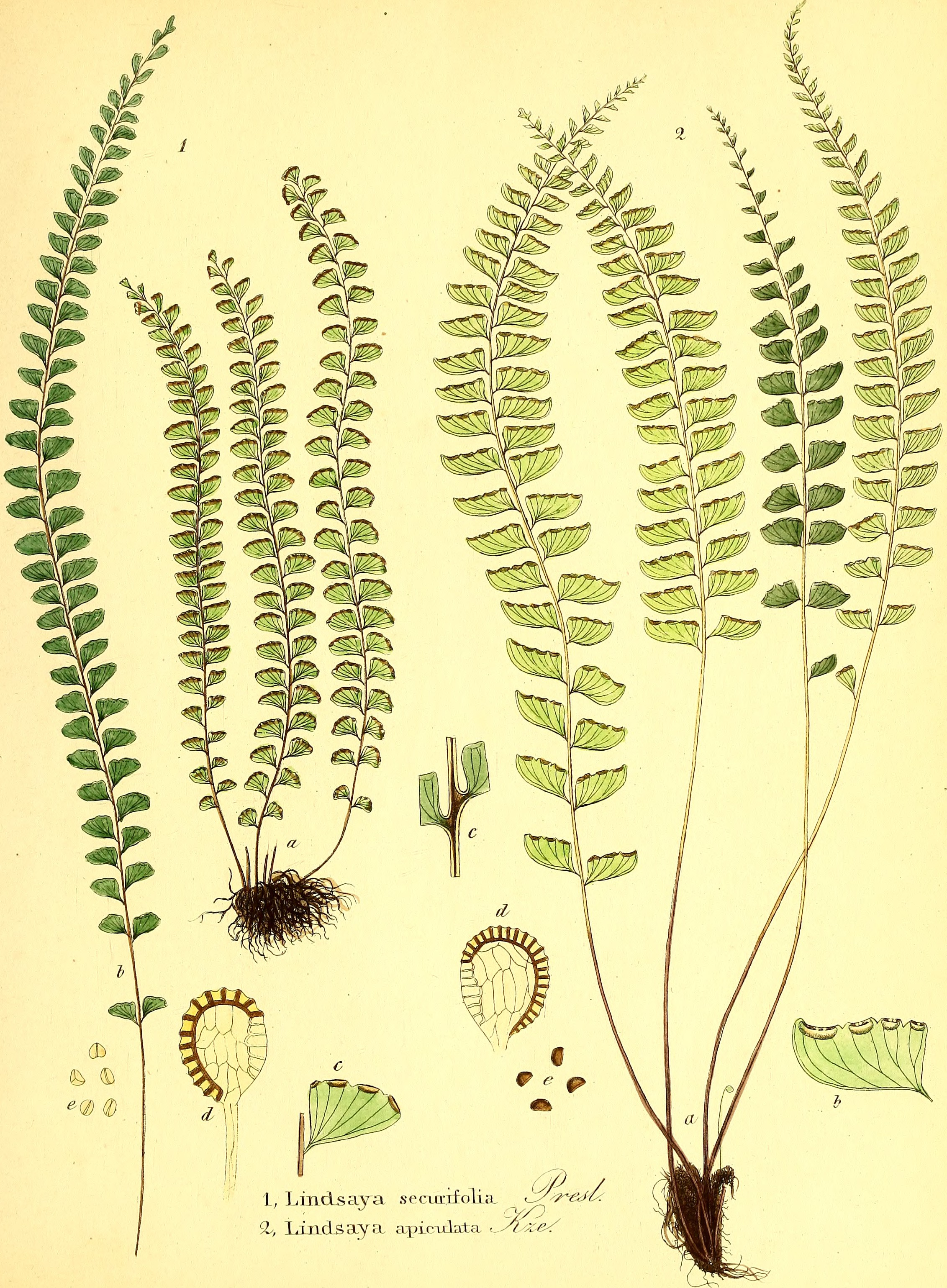
- Right: Osmolindsaea odorata (as the synonym Lindsaya apiculata)

Scientific classification
- Kingdom: Plantae
- Clade: Tracheophytes
- Division: Polypodiophyta
- Class: Polypodiopsida
- Order: Polypodiales
- Family: Lindsaeaceae
- Genus: Osmolindsaea (K.U.Kramer) Lehtonen & Christenh.

Type species
- Osmolindsaea odorata (Roxburgh) Lehtonen & Christenhusz

Species
- See text

Synonyms
- Lindsaea sect. Osmolindsaea K.U.Kramer

= Osmolindsaea =

Genus of ferns

Osmolindsaea is a genus of ferns in the family Lindsaeaceae. Most species are found in southeastern Asia, from West Himalaya and Sri Lanka to Japan and New Guinea. Osmolindsaea latisquama and Osmolindsaea leptolepida (which may be synonymous) are found in Madagascar and the adjacent African mainland.

== Phylogeny ==
As of November 2019, the Checklist of Ferns and Lycophytes of the World recognized seven species, agreeing with the number in the Pteridophyte Phylogeny Group classification of 2016 (PPG I). As of November 2019, three of these were regarded as synonyms by Plants of the World Online (PoWO).

Phylogeny from Fern Tree of Life

- Osmolindsaea
  - O. japonica (Baker) Lehtonen & Christenh.
  - - - O. minor (Hook.) Lehtonen & Christenh. [= Osmolindsaea odorata in PoWO]
      - O. odorata (Roxb.) Lehtonen & Christenh.
    - - O. latisquama Lehtonen & Rouhan
      - O. leptolepida Rouhan & Lehtonen [=Osmolindsaea latisquama in PoWO]

Other species include:
- O. himalaica (K.U.Kramer) Lehtonen & Christenh.
- O. plumula (Ridl.) Lehtonen & Tuomisto [=Osmolindsaea odorata in PoWO]
- O. ×yakushimensis Ebihara & Nakato {Osmolindsaea japonica × Osmolindsaea odorata}
