= Sphenomeris =

Scientific classification
- Kingdom: Plantae
- Clade: Tracheophytes
- Division: Polypodiophyta
- Class: Polypodiopsida
- Order: Polypodiales
- Family: Lindsaeaceae
- Genus: Sphenomeris; Maxon

Type species
- Sphenomeris clavata (L.) Maxon

Species
- S. clavata; S. killipii; S. spathulata

Synonyms
- Stenoloma Fée 1852 nom rej.

Genus of ferns

Sphenomeris is a genus of ferns in the family Lindsaeaceae.

== Species ==
As of November 2019, the Checklist of Ferns and Lycophytes of the World recognized the following species:

- Sphenomeris clavata (L.) Maxon
- Sphenomeris killipii (Maxon) Kramer
- Sphenomeris spathulata (Maxon) Kramer

Other sources place these species in the genus Odontosoria.
