= Nesolindsaea =

Scientific classification
- Kingdom: Plantae
- Clade: Tracheophytes
- Division: Polypodiophyta
- Class: Polypodiopsida
- Order: Polypodiales
- Family: Lindsaeaceae
- Genus: Nesolindsaea; Lehtonen & Christenh.

Type species
- Nesolindsaea caudata (Hooker) Lehtonen & Christenhusz

Species
- N. caudata; N. kirkii

Synonyms
- Lindsaea section Aulacorhachis Kramer 1972

Genus of ferns

Nesolindsaea is a genus of ferns in the family Lindsaeaceae with two species. Nesolindsaea caudata is native to southeast tropical Asia, from Sri Lanka to Borneo. Nesolindsaea kirkii is found only in the Seychelles.

== Species ==
As of November 2019, the Checklist of Ferns and Lycophytes of the World and Plants of the World Online recognized the following species:

- Nesolindsaea caudata (Hook.) Lehtonen & Christenh.
- Nesolindsaea kirkii (Hook.) Lehtonen & Christenh.
