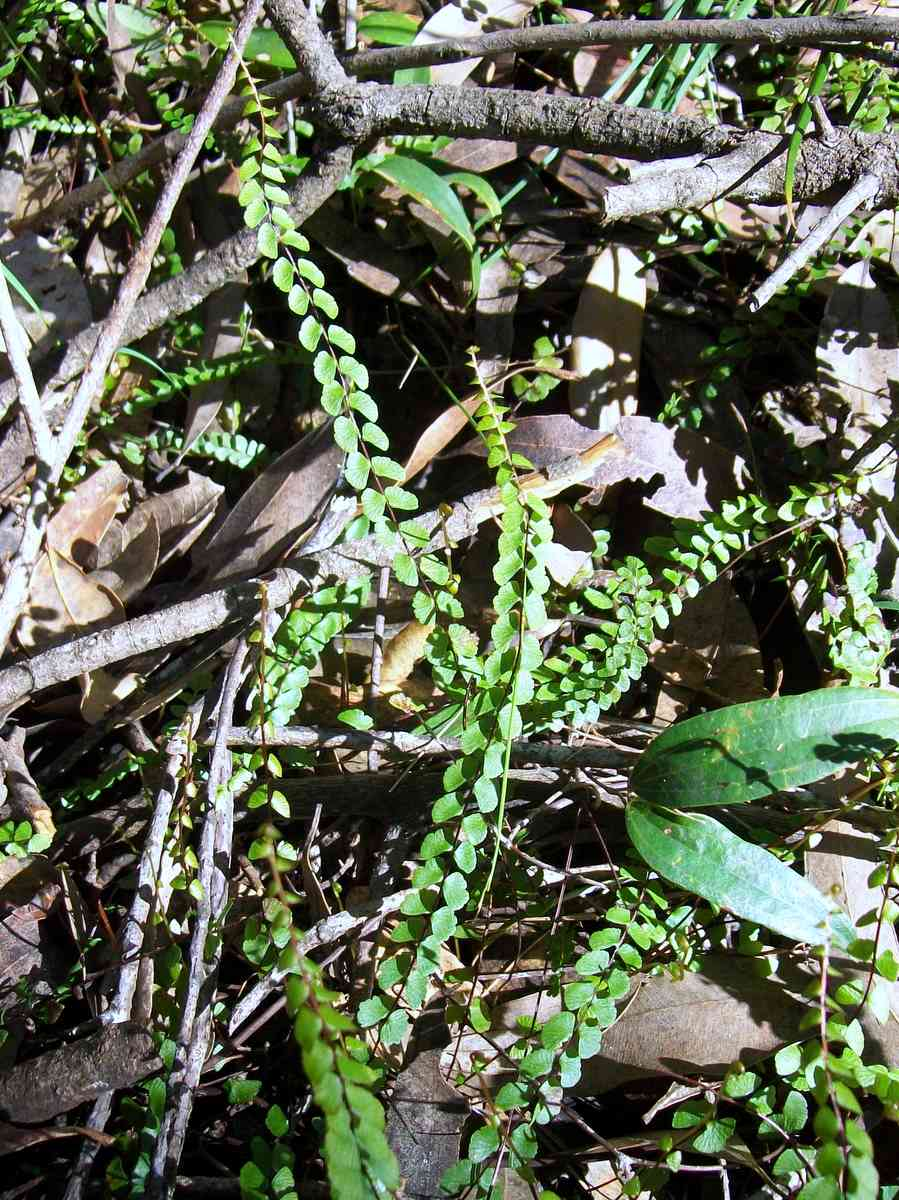
- Screw fern at Ferndale Park, Chatswood West, Australia

Scientific classification
- Kingdom: Plantae
- Clade: Tracheophytes
- Division: Polypodiophyta
- Class: Polypodiopsida
- Order: Polypodiales
- Family: Lindsaeaceae
- Genus: Lindsaea
- Species: L. linearis

Binomial name
- Lindsaea linearis Sw.

Synonyms
- Adiantum lineare (Sw.) Poir.; Lindsaea trilobata Colenso; Lindsaea lunata Willd.; Lindsaya linearis orth. var. F.Muell.

= Lindsaea linearis =

Screw fern

Species of fern

Lindsaea linearis is known as the screw fern, as the fronds may have a twisting appearance. It has a creeping stem with fronds that can grow up to 50 cm (20 in) in length. It is a small fern of widespread distribution in many parts of Australia, as well as New Zealand and New Caledonia. Found in a variety of habitats, often near swamps or moist places and by rocks, heathland or open forest. It has a dark stem, unlike the similar necklace fern, which is green.

The screw fern was first described by Swedish botanist Olof Swartz in 1801, and still bears its original name. Two varieties are recognised, namely var. linearis and var. cuneata.
