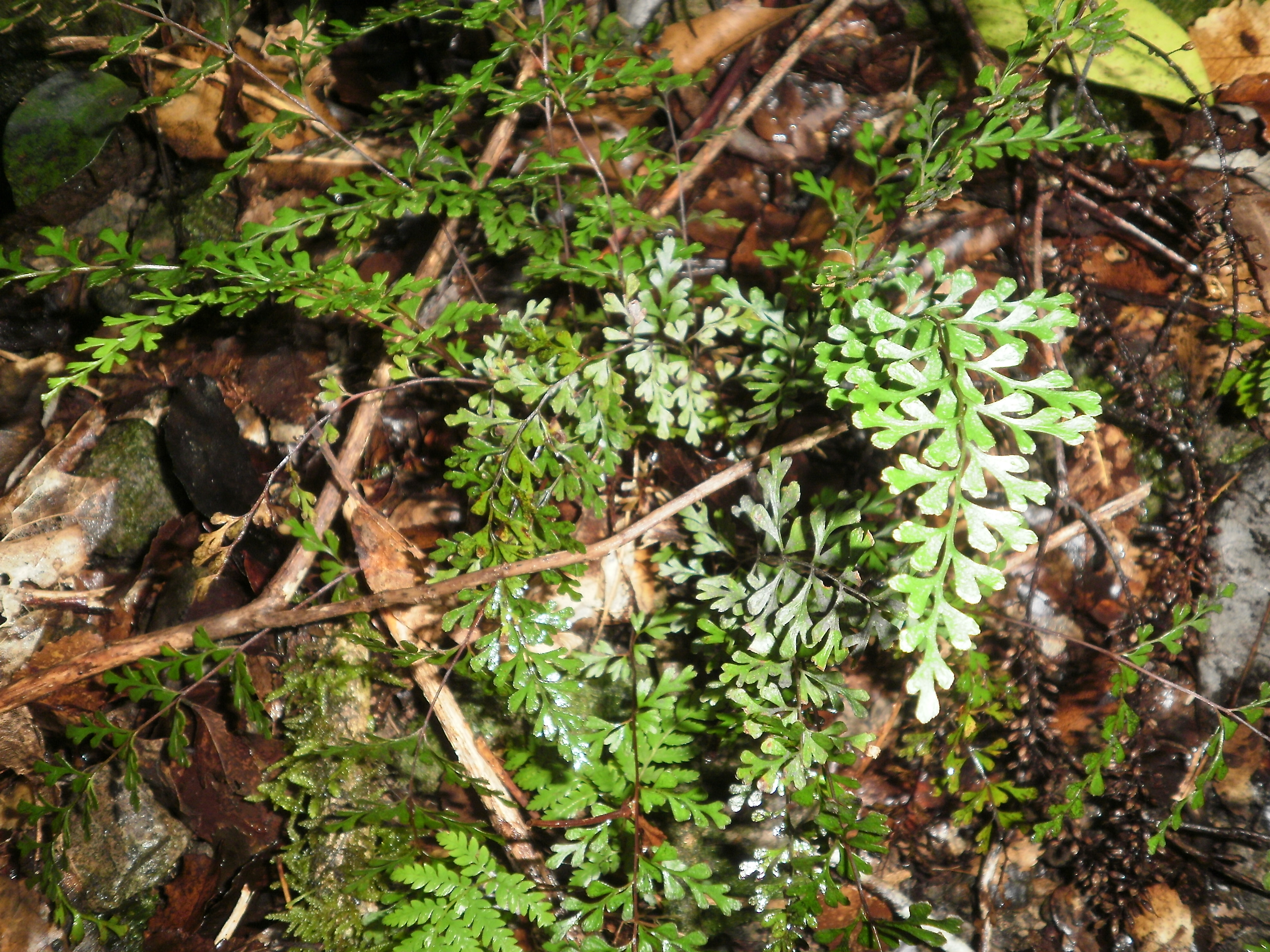

Scientific classification
- Kingdom: Plantae
- Clade: Tracheophytes
- Division: Polypodiophyta
- Class: Polypodiopsida
- Order: Polypodiales
- Family: Lindsaeaceae
- Genus: Lindsaea
- Species: L. trichomanoides

Binomial name
- Lindsaea trichomanoides Dryand.

Synonyms
- List: Adiantum cuneatum G.Forst.; Adiantum trichomanoides Poir.; Davallia cuneata Spreng.; Lindsaea cuneata (Forst.) C.Chr.; Lindsaea lessonii Bory; Lindsaea trichomanoides var. lessonii (Bory) Hook.f.; Schizoloma trichomanoides Kuhn

= Lindsaea trichomanoides =

Species of plant

Lindsaea trichomanoides is a small, tufted fern from Australia and New Zealand. It is typically found on dry sites in lowland to montane forest and shrubland.

The fronds of L. trichomanoides are between 5 cm and 25 cm long.
