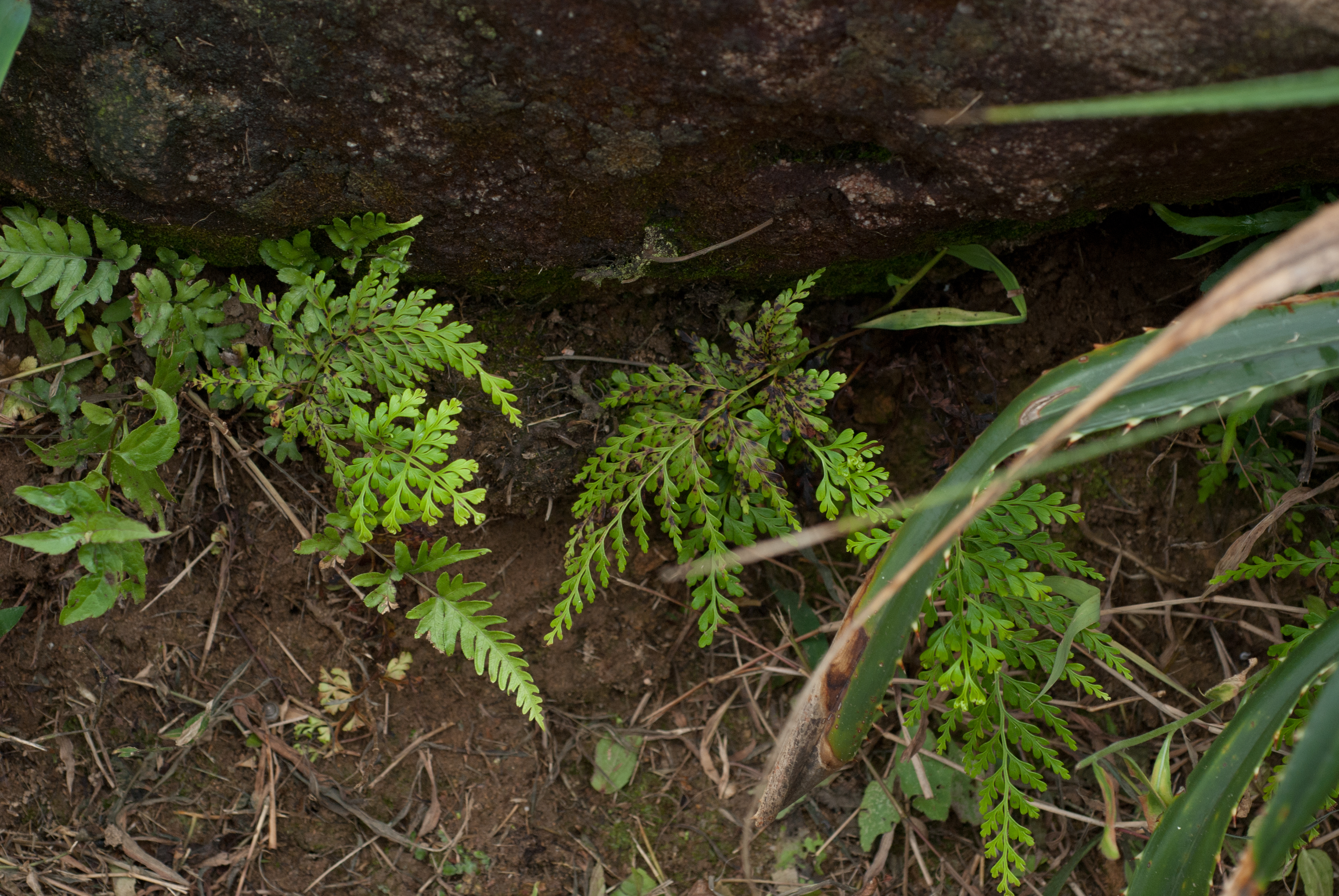
- In Taiwan

Scientific classification
- Kingdom: Plantae
- Clade: Tracheophytes
- Division: Polypodiophyta
- Class: Polypodiopsida
- Order: Polypodiales
- Family: Lindsaeaceae
- Genus: Odontosoria
- Species: O. biflora

Binomial name
- Odontosoria biflora (Kaulf.) C.Chr.

Synonyms
- Davallia biflora Kaulf.; Microlepia biflora (Kaulf.) Mett.; Odontosoria tsoongii Ching; Sphenomeris biflora (Kaulf.) Tagawa; Sphenomeris chinensis subsp. biflora (Kaulf.) Jôtani & Ohba; Stenoloma biflorum (Kaulf.) Ching; Stenoloma littorale Tagawa

= Odontosoria biflora =

Species of fern

Odontosoria biflora is a species of fern in the family Lindsaeaceae. As with other species in the family, it has been placed in different genera; synonyms include Sphenomeris biflora and Sphenomeris chinensis ssp. biflora. It is native to Southeast China, Korea, Japan and its offshore islands, Taiwan, and the Philippines. The fronds are leathery in texture, with the final segments being wedge-shaped. In the northern Philippines, it is described as "common", being found on ridges and rocks at elevations of up to about 150 m.

Known in parts of the Philippines by the Ivatan name tubho, sun-dried leaves are used to make tubho tea.
