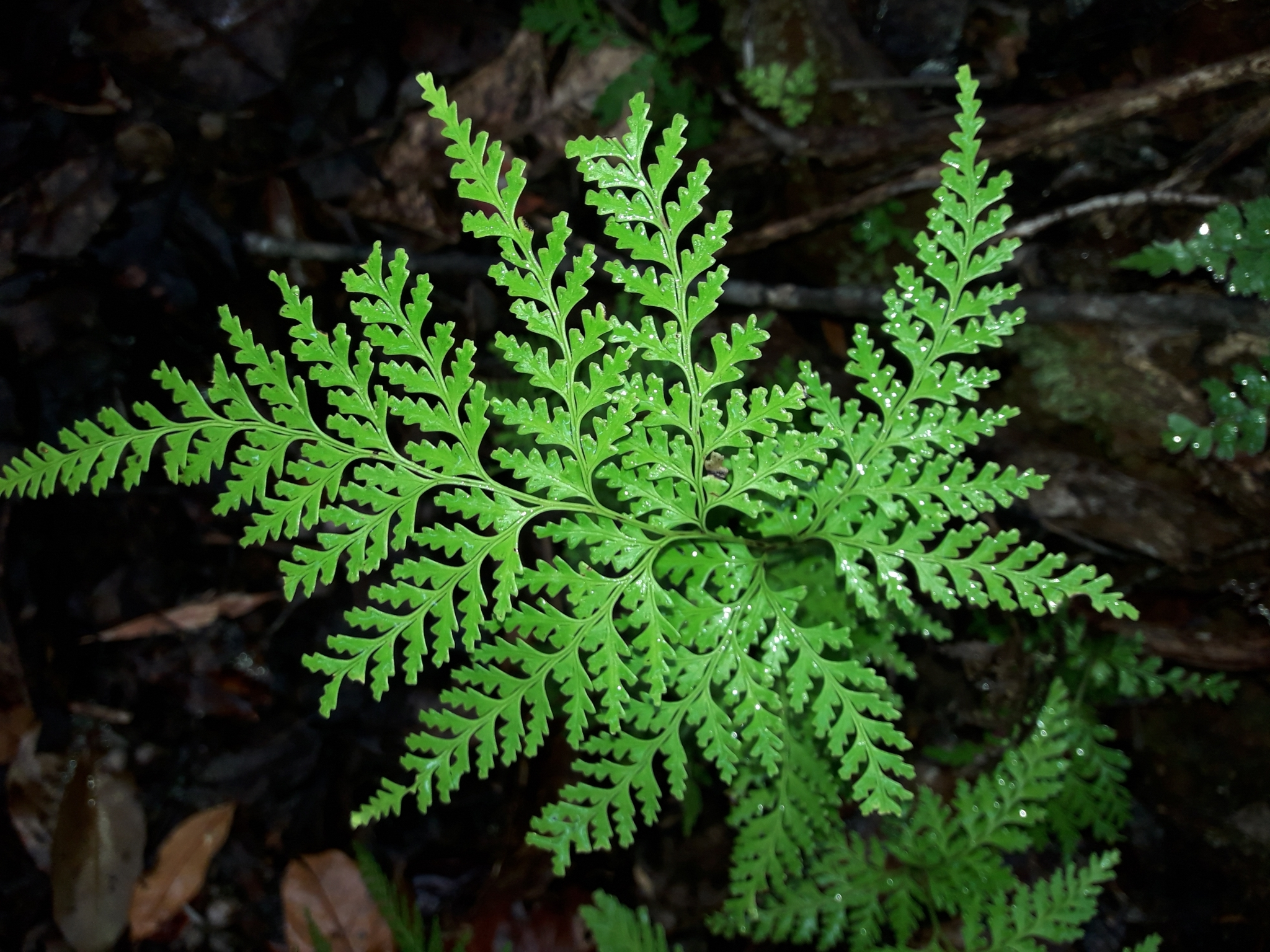
- Tapeinidium moorei in New Caledonia

Scientific classification
- Kingdom: Plantae
- Clade: Tracheophytes
- Division: Polypodiophyta
- Class: Polypodiopsida
- Order: Polypodiales
- Family: Lindsaeaceae
- Genus: Tapeinidium (Presl) C.Chr.

Type species
- Tapeinidium pinnatum (Cavanilles) Christensen

Species
- See text

Synonyms
- Microlepia (Tapeinidium) Presl; Ithycaulon Copeland; Protolindsaya Copeland; Wibelia Fée 1850-52

= Tapeinidium =

Genus of ferns

Tapeinidium is a genus of ferns in the family Lindsaeaceae, consisting of about 19 species. These species are native to southeastern Asia, ranging from Thailand to New Guinea, and into the western Pacific. Tapeinidium pinnatum has also been introduced into India.

== Phylogeny ==
The group was first described by Carl Presl in 1851 as a subgenus, Microlepia subg. Tapeinidium. It was raised to the rank of genus by Carl Christensen in 1906. As of December 2019, the Checklist of Ferns and Lycophytes of the World recognized the following species:

Phylogeny of Tapeinidium

- Tapeinidium
  - T. moorei (Hook.) Hieron.
  - - - T. carolinense Kramer
      - T. pinnatum (Cav.) C.Chr.
    - - - - T. denhamii (Hook.) C.Chr.
          - T. novoguineense Kramer
        - - T. gracile (Blume) Alderw.
          - T. luzonicum (Hook.) Kramer
      - - T. calomelanos Kramer
        - - T. melanesicum Kramer
          - - T. longipinnatum (Ces.) C.Chr.
            - T. moluccanum (Blume) C.Chr.

Other species include:
- T. acuminatum Kramer
- T. atratum Kramer
- T. biserratum (Blume) Alderw.
- T. buniifolium Kramer
- T. obtusatum Alderw.
- T. oligophlebium (Baker) C.Chr.
- T. prionoides Kramer
- T. stenocarpum Alderw.
