= Darwinulidae =

Scientific classification
- Kingdom: Animalia
- Phylum: Arthropoda
- Clade: Pancrustacea
- Class: Ostracoda
- Order: Podocopida
- Family: Darwinulidae

Family of crustaceans

Darwinulidae is a family of ostracods belonging to the order Podocopida.

Genera:

- Alicenula Rossetti & Martens, 1998
- Darwella
- Darwinula Brady & Norman, 1889
- Isabenula Rossetti, Pinto & Martens, 2011
- Microdarwinula Danielopol, 1969
- Penthesilenula Rossetti & Martens, 1998
- Vestalenula Rossetti & Martens, 1998
