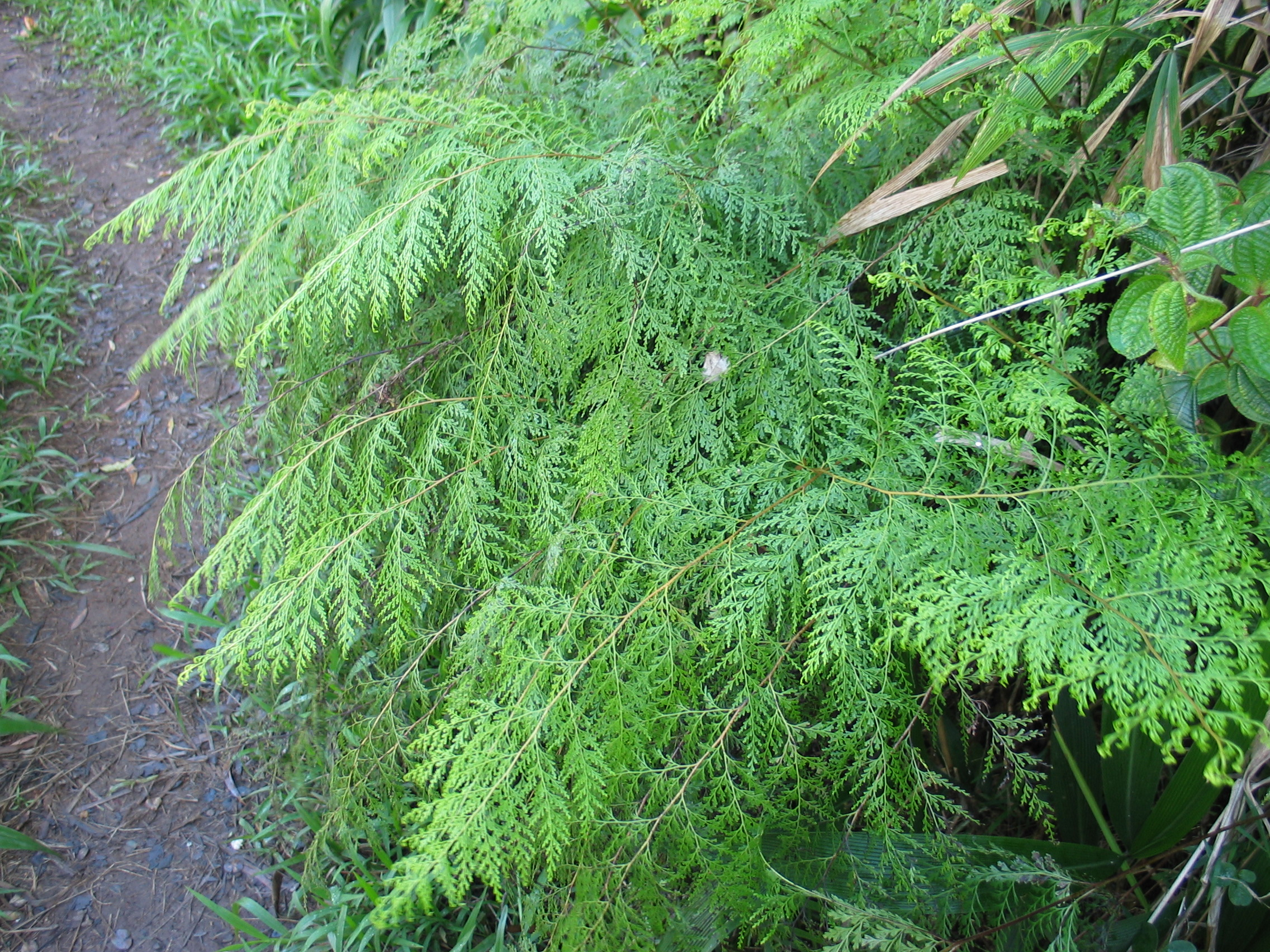
- Odontosoria chinensis

Scientific classification
- Kingdom: Plantae
- Clade: Tracheophytes
- Division: Polypodiophyta
- Class: Polypodiopsida
- Order: Polypodiales
- Family: Lindsaeaceae
- Genus: Odontosoria (C.Presl) Fée

Type species
- Odontosoria uncinella (Kunze) Fée

Species
- See text

Synonyms
- Davallia section Odontosoria Presl; Humblotiella Tardieu-Blot; Lindsayopsis Kuhn; Lourdesia Barcelona & Hickey

= Odontosoria =

Genus of ferns

Odontosoria is a genus of ferns in the family Lindsaeaceae.

== Phylogeny ==
As of November 2019, the Checklist of Ferns and Lycophytes of the World recognized the following species:

Phylogeny of Odontosoria

- Odontosoria
  - - O. melleri (Hook.) C.Chr.
    - - O. retusa (Cav.) J.Sm.
      - - O. alutacea (Mett.) Perrie & L.D.Sheph.
        - - O. angustifolia (Bernh.) C.Chr.
          - O. deltoidea (C.Chr.) Lehtonen & Tuomisto
  - - - - O. flexuosa (Spreng.) Maxon
        - O. wrightiana Maxon
      - - O. aculeata (L.) J.Sm. (Thicket creeping fern)
        - - - O. guatemalensis Christ
            - O. schlechtendalii (C.Presl) C.Chr.
          - - O. fumarioides (Sw.) J.Sm.
            - O. jenmanii Maxon
    - - O. intermedia (S.J.Lin, M.Kato & K.Iwats.) Nakaike
      - - O. biflora (Kaulf.) C.Chr.
        - - - O. afra (K.U.Kramer) J.P.Roux
            - O. africana Ballard
          - - O. minutula (Sa. Kurata) Ebihara
            - - O. chinensis (L.) J.Sm.
              - - O. gracilis (Tagawa) Ralf Knapp (treated as a synonym of O. chinensis subsp. chinensis in other sources)
                - O. scandens (Desv.) C.Chr.

Other species include:
- O. celebesiana (Barcelona & Hickey) comb. ined.
- O. colombiana Maxon
- ?O. decomposita (Baker) C.Chr.
- O. flabellifolia (Baker) C.Chr.
- ?O. goudotiana (Kunze) Christenh.
- O. gymnogrammoides Christ
- O. humbertii (Tardieu) Christenh.
- O. krameri Fraser-Jenk.
- ?O. madagascariensis (Baker) Christenh.
- O. odontolabia (Baker) Diels
- O. quadripinnata Lehtonen
- O. reyesii Caluff
- O. veitchii (Baker) Parris
- ?O. viridis Kuhn
- O. yaeyamensis (S.J.Lin, M.Kato & K.Iwats.) Ebihara

As of November 2019, Plants of the World Online places all three species of Sphenomeris in Odontosoria:

- Odontosoria clavata (L.) J.Sm. = Sphenomeris clavata (von Linné) Maxon 1913
- Odontosoria killipii (Maxon) R.M.Tryon & A.F.Tryon = Sphenomeris killipii (Maxon) Krame 1957
- Odontosoria spathulata (Maxon) R.M.Tryon & A.F.Tryon = Sphenomeris spathulata (Maxon) Kramer1957
