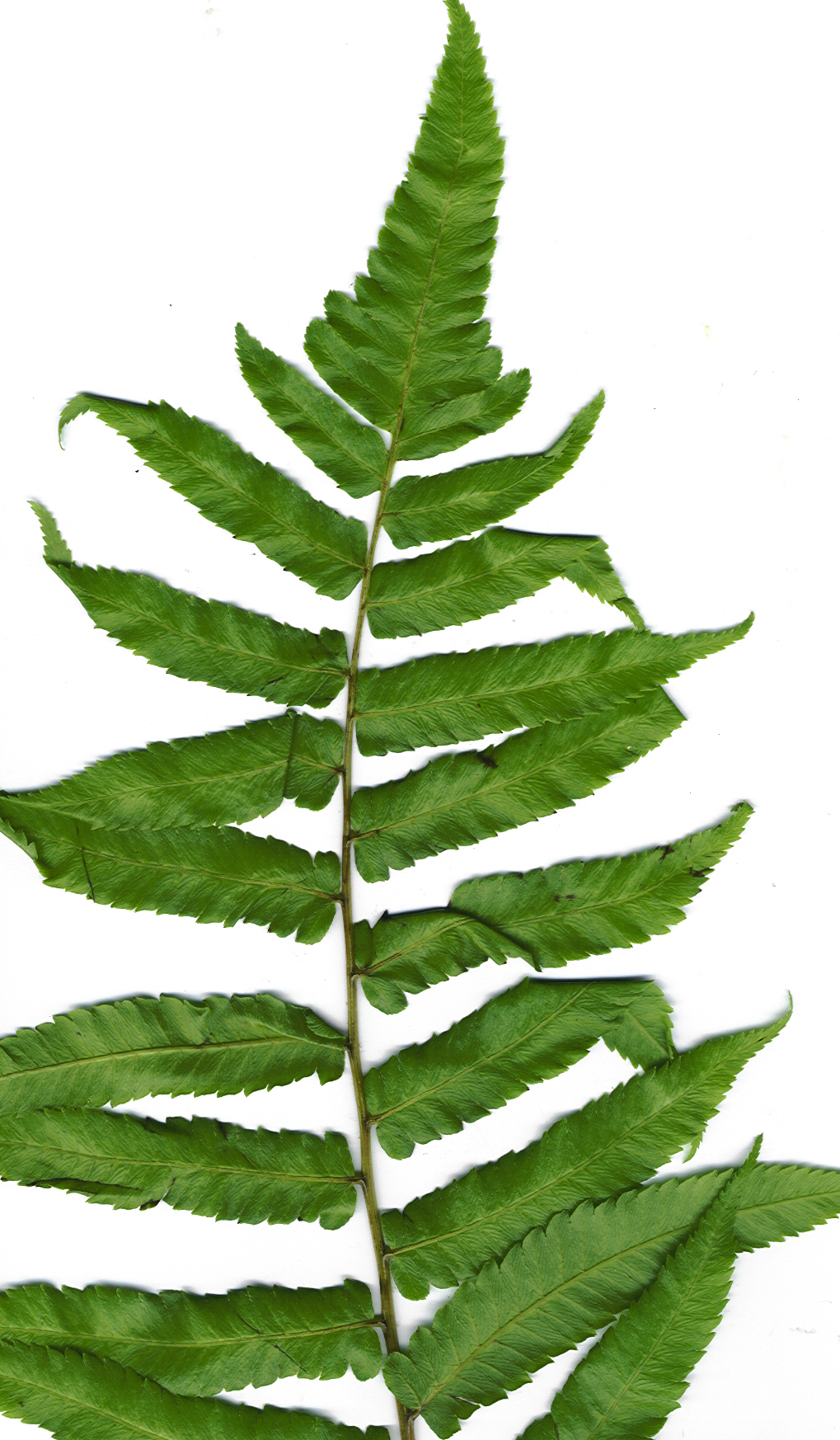

Scientific classification
- Kingdom: Plantae
- Clade: Tracheophytes
- Division: Polypodiophyta
- Class: Polypodiopsida
- Order: Polypodiales
- Suborder: Aspleniineae
- Family: Athyriaceae
- Genus: Diplazium
- Species: D. esculentum

Binomial name
- Diplazium esculentum (Retz.) Sw.

Synonyms
- Athyrium esculentum

= Diplazium esculentum =

Species of fern

Diplazium esculentum, the vegetable fern, is an edible fern found throughout Asia and Oceania. It is probably one of the most commonly consumed ferns.

The genus Diplazium is in the family Athyriaceae, in the eupolypods II clade of the order Polypodiales, in the class Polypodiopsida.

== Description ==
This plant is a large perennial fern with an ascending rhizome of about 50 cm high and covered with short rufous scales of about 1 mm long. The plant is bipinnate with long brownish petioles, and the petiole base is black and covered with short scales. The frond can reach 1.5 m in length, and the pinnae is about 8 cm long and 2 cm wide.

== Uses ==
The young fronds are stir-fried and used in salads.

They may have mild amounts of fern toxins but no major toxic effects are recorded.

It is known as pakô ("wing") in the Philippines, pucuk paku and paku tanjung in Malaysia, sayur paku or pakis in Indonesia, phak koot (Thai: ผักกูด) in Thailand, rau dớn in Vietnam, dhekia (Assamese: ঢেঁকীয়া) in Assamese, Dhenki Shaak (Bengali: ঢেঁকি শাক) in Bengali, paloi saag (Bengali: পালই শাগ) in Eastern Bengali, ningro in Nepali, dingkia in Boro and linguda in northern India, referring to the curled fronds.

It is known as pohole or hō'i'o in Hawaiian cuisine. The ferns grow in wet areas of shady valleys. The fern species Diplazium esculentum is believed to have been introduced and naturalized in Hawaii and was first reported collected in 1910. The fern also has medicinal uses.

== Pharmacological effects ==
The extract also had alpha-glucosidase inhibitory activity.

== Gallery ==
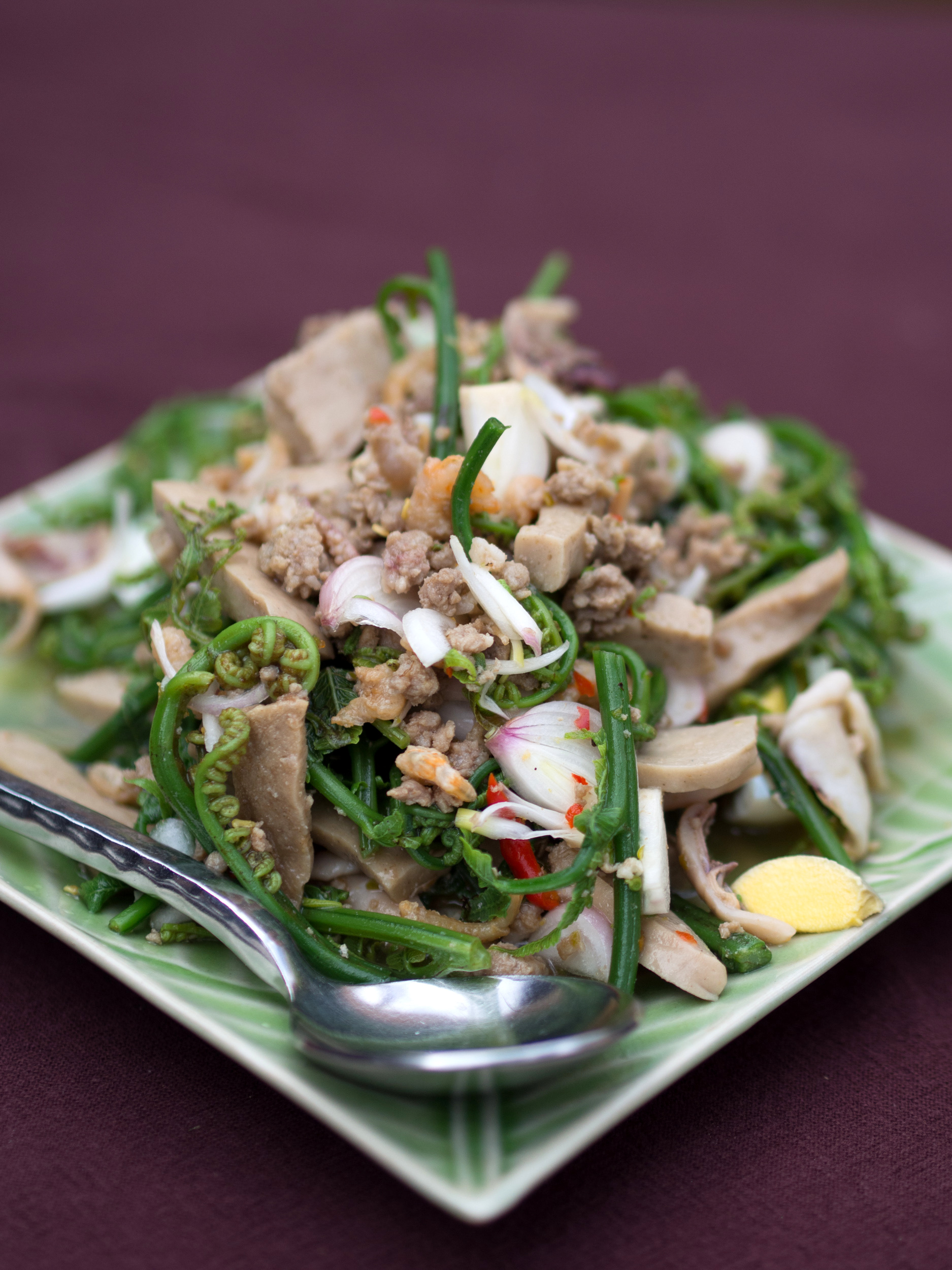
Yam phak khut, a Thai salad of fern leaves and pork

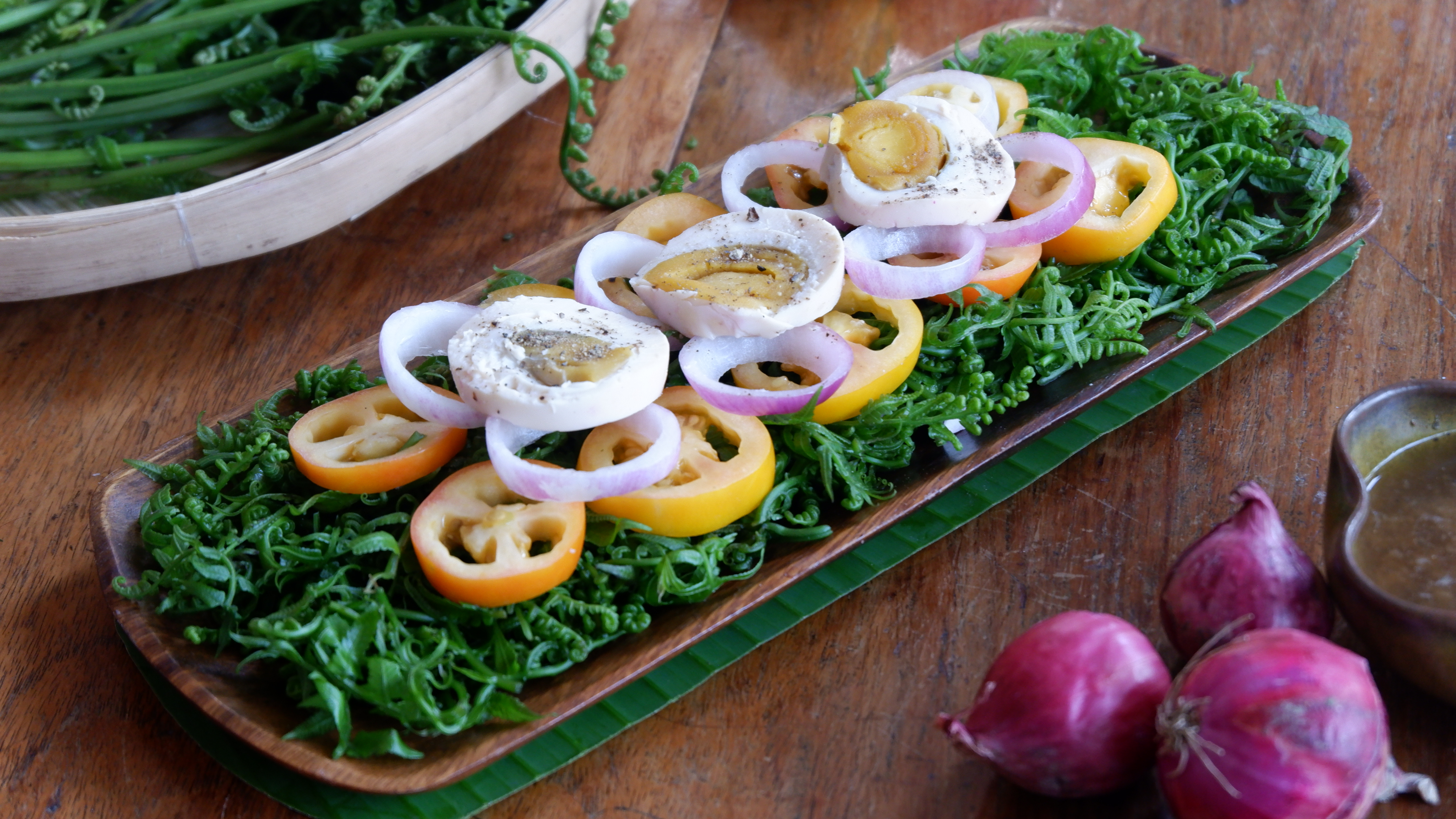
Ensaladang pako (fern salad) with salted egg from the Philippines

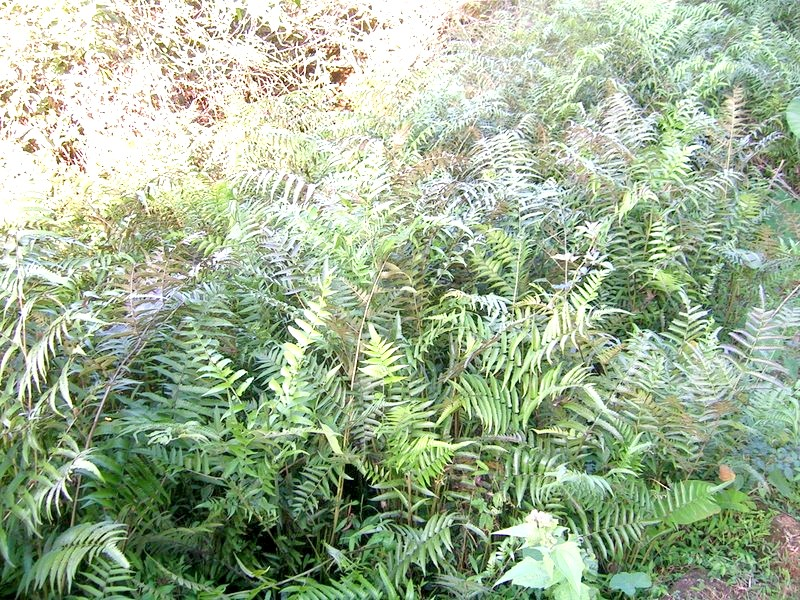
Habitat

== See also ==
- Fiddlehead fern
- Sphenomeris chinensis
