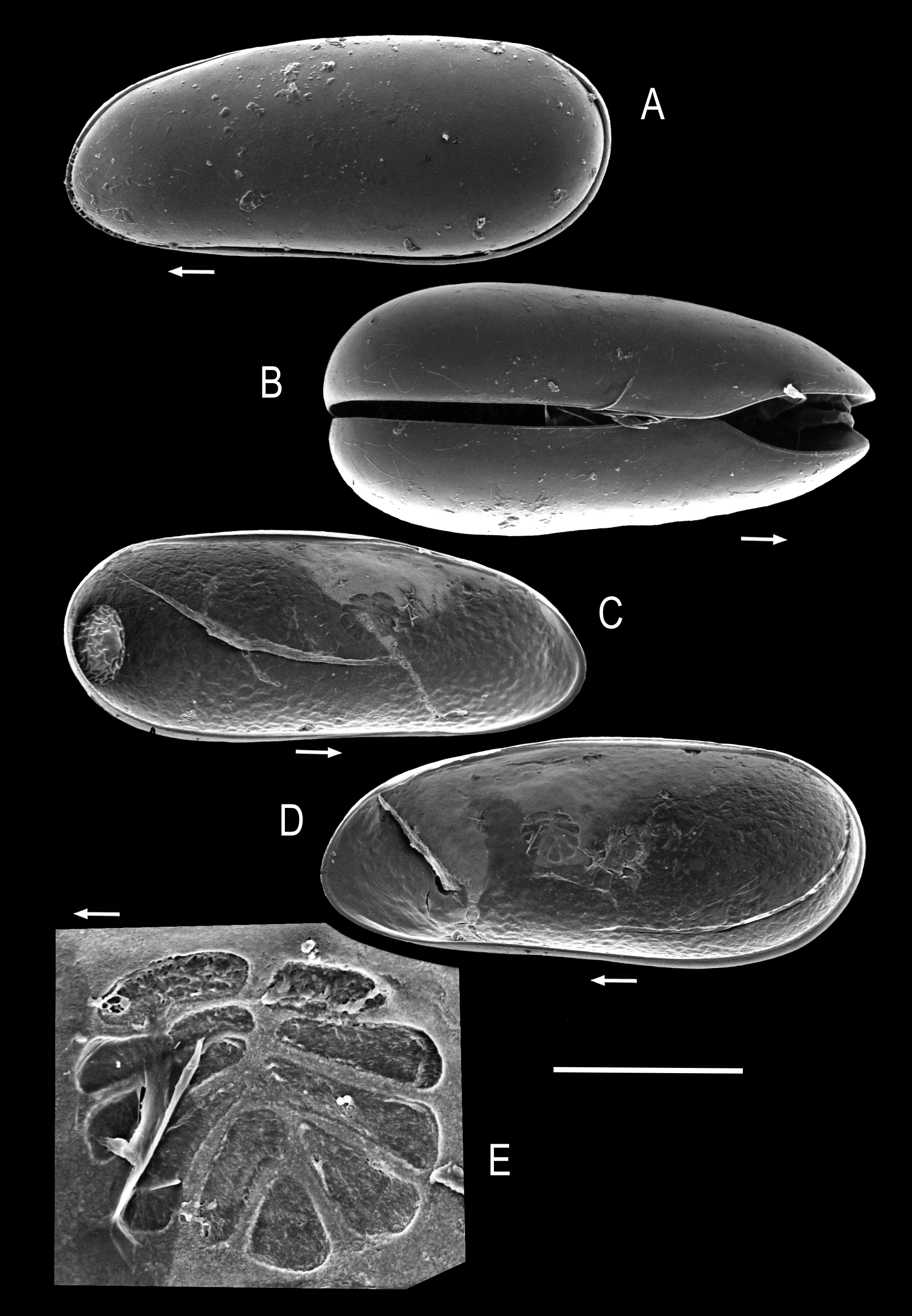
- Scanning electron micrographs of Darwinula Stevensoni

Scientific classification
- Domain: Eukaryota
- Kingdom: Animalia
- Phylum: Arthropoda
- Class: Ostracoda
- Order: Podocopida
- Family: Darwinulidae
- Genus: Darwinula; Jones, 1885

= Darwinula =

Darwinula Temporal range: Permian–Recent

Genus of seed shrimps

Darwinula is a genus of ostracods belonging to the family Darwinulidae.

Species:

- Darwinula aurea
- Darwinula stevensoni (Brady & Robertson, 1870)
