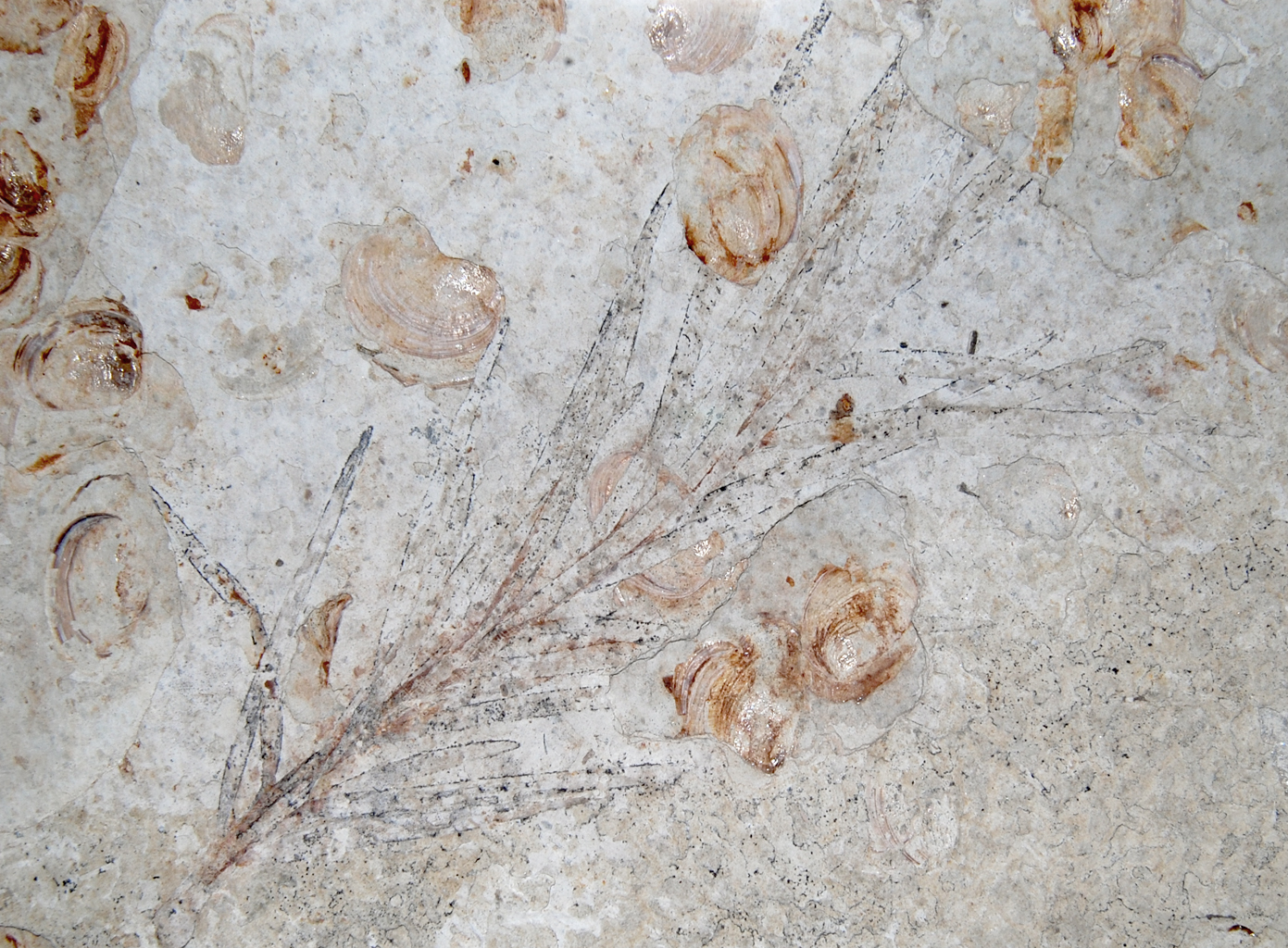

Scientific classification
- Kingdom: Plantae
- Clade: Tracheophytes
- Clade: Gymnospermae
- Division: Pinophyta
- Genus: †Elatocladus; Halle, 1913

= Elatocladus =

Elatocladus Temporal range: Triassic–Cretaceous

Extinct genus of conifers

Elatocladus is an extinct form genus of Mesozoic sterile conifer leaves, used for shoots with the morphology of "elongated, dorsiventrally flattened leaves with a single vein; divergent from stem". Conifers with leaves of Elatocladus morphology are of uncertain taxonomic position within conifers.
