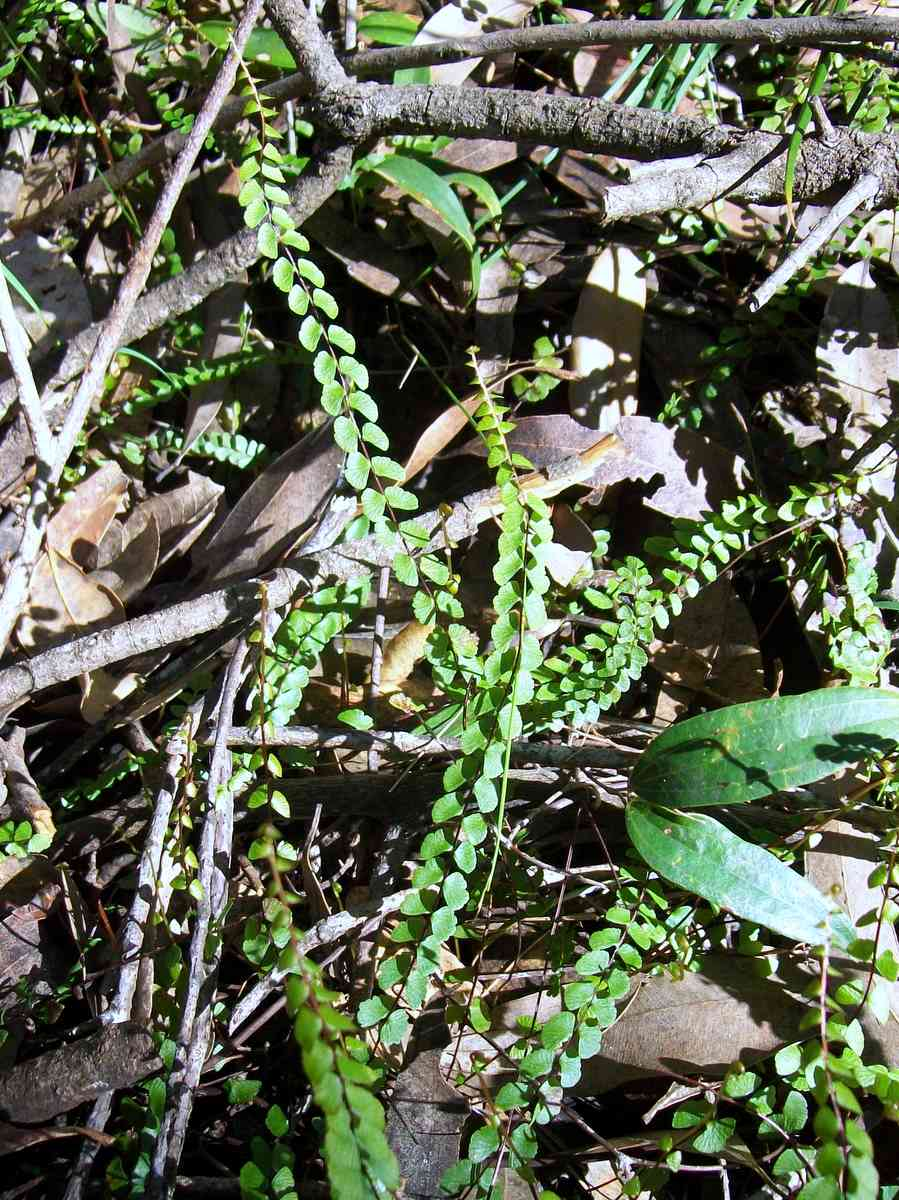
- Lindsaea linearis at Chatswood West, Australia

Scientific classification
- Kingdom: Plantae
- Clade: Tracheophytes
- Division: Polypodiophyta
- Class: Polypodiopsida
- Order: Polypodiales
- Family: Lindsaeaceae
- Genus: Lindsaea; Dryand. ex Sm.

Type species
- Lindsaea trapeziformis Dryand.

Synonyms
- Guerinia Smith 1875; Hymenotomia Gaudichaud-Beaupré 1829; Isoloma Smith 1841 non Decaisne 1848; Lindsaenium Fée 1850; Odontoloma Smith 1841; Ormoloma Maxon 1933; Paralindsaya (Christensen 1857) Keyserling 1873; Pericoptis Wallich 1828; Sambirania Tardieu 1956; Schizolegnia Alston 1956; Schizoloma Gaudichaud-Beaupré 1824; Synaphlebium Smith 1841 ex Hooker 1842

= Lindsaea =

Genus of ferns

Lindsaea, common name necklace fern, is a genus of around 180 species of fern, 15 of which reach Australia. The name is in honour of surgeon John Lindsay of Jamaica. The genus is sometimes spelt Lindsaya.

== Species ==
As of November 2019, the Checklist of Ferns and Lycophytes of the World recognized the following species:

Phylogeny of Lindsaea

- - - section Tropidolindsaea
      - L. pratensis Maxon
      - L. seemannii J.Sm.
  - - - (Isoloma)
        - L. plicata Baker
        - - L. viridis Colenso
          - - - L. gueriniana (Gaudich.) Desv.
              - L. pellaeiformis Christ
            - - L. divergens Wall. ex Hook. & Grev.
              - L. jamesonioides Baker
    - - (Odontoloma)
        - - section Stenolindsaea
            L. lucida Blume
        - - section Odontoloma
            - - L. brachypoda Salomon
              - - L. lapeyrousei (Hook.) Baker
                - - L. brevipes Copel.
                  - L. kingii Copel.
            - - - L. regularis Rosenst.
                - L. rosenstockii Brause
              - - - L. borneensis Hook.
                  - L. doryphora K.U.Kramer
                - - - L. parasitica (Roxburgh ex Griff.) Hieronymus
                    - L. yaeyamensis Tagawa
                  - - - L. apoensis Copel.
                      - L. pectinata Blume
                    - - - L. oblanceolata Alderw.
                        - L. repens (Bory) Thwaites
                      - - L. carvifolia K.U.Kramer
                        - - L. merrillii Copel.
                          - L. pseudohemiptera (Alderw.) Lehtonen & Tuomisto
          - section Synaphlebium
            - - - L. azurea Christ
                - L. novoguineensis S.Y.Dong
              - - L. harveyi Carruth.
                - - L. chrysolepis K.U.Kramer
                  - L. obtusa J.Sm. ex Hook.
            - - L. pacifica K.U.Kramer
              - - - - L. pulchella Mett.
                    - L. werneri Rosenst.
                  - - L. subobscura S.Y.Dong
                    - - L. pickeringii (Brack.) Mett.
                      - - L. pulchra Carruth.
                        - L. vitiensis K.U.Kramer
                - - - L. tenuifolia Blume
                    - - L. multisora Alderw.
                      - L. tetragona K.U.Kramer
                  - - L. parallelogramma Alderw.
                    - - L. rigida J.Sm.
                      - - L. longifolia Copel.
                        - - L. lobata Poir.
                          - - L. venusta Kaulf. ex Kuhn
                            - - L. malayensis Holttum
                              - - L. cultrata (Willd.) Sw.
                                - - L. crispa Baker
                                  - L. integra Holttum
      - (Lindsaea)
        - - L. monocarpa Rosenstock
          - - L. incisa Prentice
            - L. microphylla Swartz (lacy wedge fern, Australia)
        - - L. imrayana (Hook.) Perez
          - - - section Paralindsaea
                - L. linearis Sw. (screw fern, Australia)
                - - L. botrychioides A.St.-Hil.
                  - - L. rufa K.U.Kramer
                    - L. trichomanoides Dryand. 1797 (New Zealand, Australia)
              - section Schizoloma
                - - L. nervosa Mett.
                  - L. prolongata E.Fourn.
                - - L. fraseri Hook.
                  - - - - L. hamiguitanensis Karger & V.B.Amoroso
                        - - L. eberhardtii (Christ) K.U.Kramer
                          - - L. austrosinica Ching
                            - L. grandiareolata (Bonap.) K.U.Kramer
                      - - L. walkerae Hook.
                        - - ×Lindsaeosoria flynnii Wagner 1993
                          - - L. millefolium K.U.Kramer
                            - - L. goudotiana (Kunze) Mettenius
                              - L. subtilis K.U.Kramer
                    - - L. ensifolia Sw.
                      - - L. bouillodii Christ [Lindsaea interrupta (Wallich ex Roxburgh) Morton]
                        - - - - L. chienii Ching
                              - L. javanensis Blume
                            - - - L. orbiculata (Lam.) Mett. ex Kuhn
                                - L. repanda Kunze
                              - - - L. bonii Christ
                                  - L. heterophylla Dryand.
                                - - L. cambodgensis Christ
                                  - L. kawabatae Sa.Kurata
                          - - L. schizophylla Christ
                            - - L. gomphophylla Baker
                              - - L. vieillardii Mett.
                                - - - L. leptophylla Baker
                                    - L. madagascariensis Baker
                                  - - L. blotiana K.U.Kramer
                                    - - L. oxyphylla Baker
                                      - - L. agatii (Brack.) Lehtonen & Tuomisto
                                        - L. media R.Br.
            - - section Lindsaea
                - L. ovoidea Fée
                - - L. virescens Sw.
                  - - L. bifida Mett.
                    - - L. feei C.Chr.
                      - - - L. schomburgkii Klotzsch
                          - L. stricta (Sw.) Dryand.
                        - - - L. cubensis Underw. & Maxon
                            - L. sagittata Dryand.
                          - - - L. pallida Klotzsch
                              - L. reniformis Dryand.
                            - - L. phassa K.U.Kramer
                              - - L. quadrangularis Raddi
                                - - L. lancea (L.) Bedd.
                                  - - - L. digitata Lehtonen & Tuomisto
                                      - - - L. divaricata Klotzsch
                                          - - L. hemiptera K.U.Kramer
                                            - L. tetraptera K.U.Kramer
                                        - - L. falcata Dryand.
                                          - - L. dubia Spreng.
                                            - L. guianensis (Aubl.) Dryand.
                                    - - - L. bolivarensis V.Marcano
                                        - L. taeniata K.U.Kramer
                                      - - L. portoricensis Desv.
                                        - - L. coarctata K.U.Kramer
                                          - - L. hemiglossa K.U.Kramer
                                            - - L. ulei Hieron.
                                              - - - L. rigidiuscula Lindm.
                                                  - - L. pendula Klotzsch
                                                    - - L. meifolia Mett.
                                                      - L. semilunata C.Chr.
                                                - - L. parkeri (Hook.) Kuhn
                                                  - - L. jamesoniiformis (Kramer) Rojas
                                                    - - L. tenuis Klotzsch
                                                      - - L. sphenomeridopsis K.U.Kramer
                                                        - - L. surinamensis Posth.
                                                          - - - L. arcuata Kunze
                                                              - L. spruceana Mett.
                                                            - - L. submontana (Boudrie & Cremers) Rojas
                                                              - - L. cyclophylla K.U.Kramer
                                                                - L. lherminieri Fée

Other species include:

- Lindsaea adiantoides J.Sm.
- Lindsaea angustipinna A.Rojas & Tejero
- Lindsaea bakeri C.Chr.
- Lindsaea capillacea Christ
- Lindsaea chingii C.Chr.
- Lindsaea coriacea (Alderw.) Fraser-Jenk.
- Lindsaea coursii (Tardieu) K.U.Kramer
- Lindsaea cultriformis K.U.Kramer
- †Lindsaea cussolii de Saporta 1865
- Lindsaea decaryana (C.Chr.) K.U.Kramer
- Lindsaea dimorpha Bailey
- Lindsaea ×dissecta Kramer
- Lindsaea eximia Copel.
- Lindsaea falciformis Hook.
- Lindsaea filipendula (Rosenst.) K.U.Kramer
- Lindsaea fissa Copel.
- Lindsaea francii Rosenst.
- †Lindsaea freyeri (Unger 1852) Palamarev & Petkova 1975
- Lindsaea fuscopetiolata A.Rojas & Tejero
- Lindsaea glandulifera Alderw.
- Lindsaea hainaniana (K.U.Kramer) Lehtonen & Tuomisto
- Lindsaea hemiacroscopica K.U.Kramer
- Lindsaea hewittii Copel.
- Lindsaea jarrettiana K.U.Kramer
- Lindsaea javitensis H.B.
- Lindsaea kalimantanensis K.Iwats. & M.Kato
- Lindsaea latifrons K.U.Kramer
- Lindsaea ×liesneri Marcano
- Lindsaea linduensis Cicuzza & M.Kessler
- Lindsaea macrophylla Kaulf.
- Lindsaea malabarica (Bedd.) Baker ex C.Chr.
- Lindsaea mazaruniensis Jenm.W.
- Lindsaea mesarum K.U.Kramer
- Lindsaea mesoamericana A.Rojas & Tejero
- Lindsaea microstegia Copel.
- Lindsaea modesta K.U.Kramer
- Lindsaea napaea Alderw.
- Lindsaea natunae Baker
- Lindsaea obscura Brause
- Lindsaea ovata J.Sm.
- Lindsaea papuana Copel.
- Lindsaea philippinensis K.U.Kramer
- Lindsaea pleioptera K.U.Kramer
- Lindsaea protensa C.Chr.
- Lindsaea pumila Klotzsch
- Lindsaea ramosii Copel.
- Lindsaea roemeriana Rosenst.
- Lindsaea salomonis K.U.Kramer
- Lindsaea sarawakensis K.U.Kramer
- Lindsaea societatis J.W.Moore
- Lindsaea stenomeris K.U.Kramer
- Lindsaea subalata (K.U.Kramer) A.Rojas & Tejero
- Lindsaea subalpina Alderw.
- Lindsaea tenera Dryand.
- Lindsaea terrae-reginae K.U.Kramer
- Lindsaea versteegii (Christ) Alderw.
