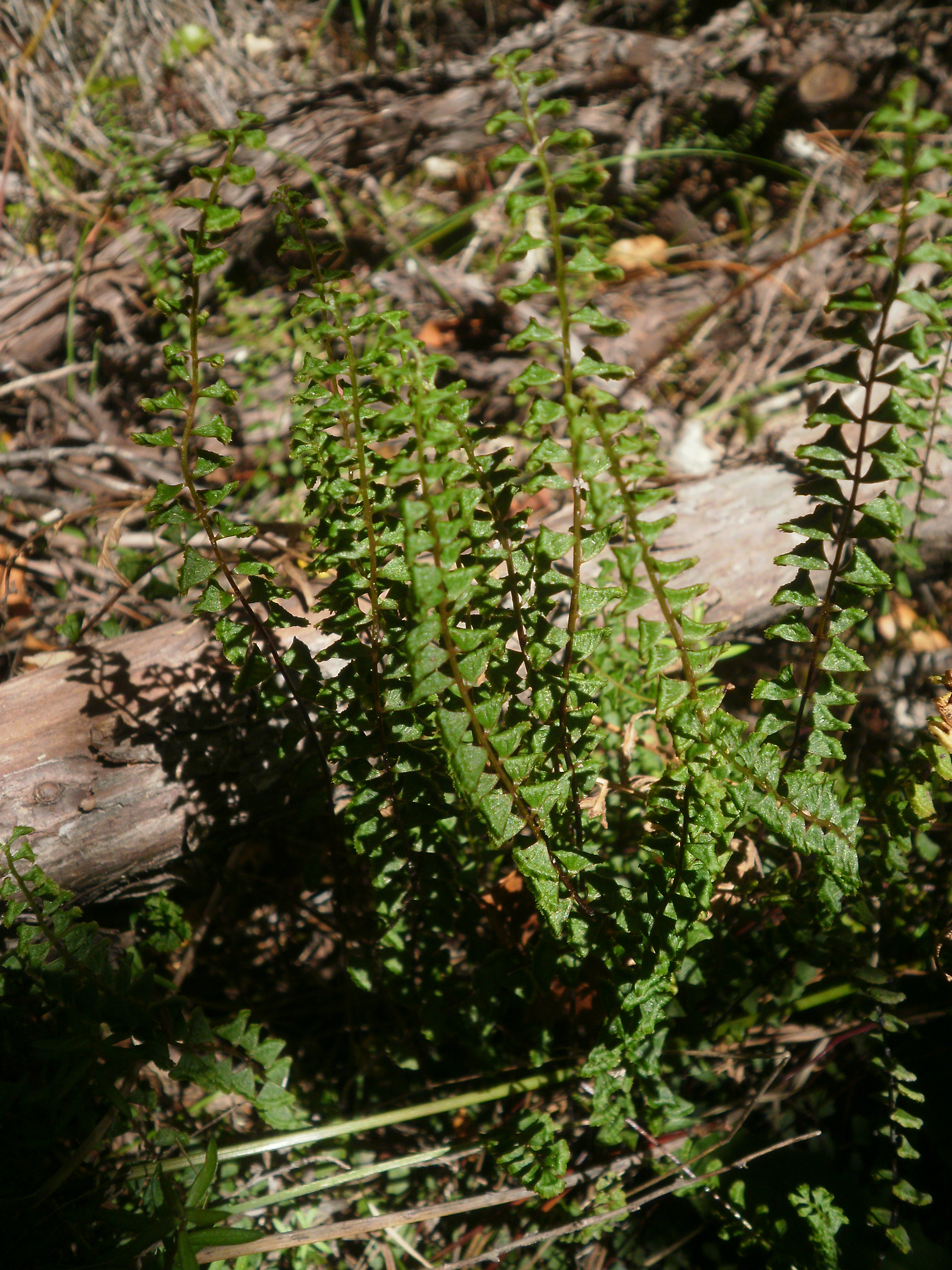
- Lindsaea linearis

Scientific classification
- Kingdom: Plantae
- Clade: Tracheophytes
- Division: Polypodiophyta
- Class: Polypodiopsida
- Order: Polypodiales
- Suborder: Lindsaeineae
- Family: Lindsaeaceae; C.Presl ex M.R.Schomb.

Genera
- See text

Synonyms
- Lindsaeeae Hooker 1846; Lindsaeinae Payer 1850; Lindsaeoideae Crabbe, Jermy & Mickel 1975

= Lindsaeaceae =

Lindsaeaceae Temporal range: Albian–Recent

Family of ferns

Lindsaeaceae is a pantropical family of ferns in the order Polypodiales. It contains six or seven genera with about 220 known species, some of which also extend into the more temperate regions of eastern Asia, New Zealand, and South America.

== Description ==
Characteristics include: Rhizomes short to long creeping; rhizomes with nonclathrate scales or uniseriate hairs; blades 1-3 pinnate or more divided; veins usually free; sori marginal or submarginal; indusia open towards margin, sometimes attached at sides, or sori covered by the reflexed segment margin.

== Taxonomy ==
For more than a century, these ferns were considered part of the Davalliaceae. Then starting in the mid-twentieth century they began to be transferred to the Dennstaedtiaceae. Molecular data supported the separation of Lindsaeaceae into its own family, which was proposed in 1970. Lindsaeaceae is considered among the most basal of the families in the order Polypodiales.

The genus Lonchitis has many morphological characteristics similar to Dennstaedtiaceae, but a few characteristics of the spore are similar to the lindsaeoid genera, and molecular data placed this genus in Lindsaeaceae. It is now placed in the related family Lonchitidaceae.

External phylogeny

- Polypodiales
  - - Saccolomatineae
      Saccolomataceae
    - Lindsaeineae
      - Cystodiaceae
      - - Lonchitidaceae
        - Lindsaeaceae
  - remaining Polypodiales

Internal phylogeny from Fern Tree of Life

- Lindsaeaceae
  - - Sphenomeris
    - - Osmolindsaea
      - - Nesolindsaea
        - Tapeinidium
  - - Odontosoria
    - Lindsaea

The Pteridophyte Phylogeny Group classification of 2016 (PPG I) recognized seven genera.

- Lindsaea Dryand. ex Sm. (about 180 species)
- × Lindsaeosoria Wagner (1 species)
- Nesolindsaea Lehtonen & Christenh. (2 species)
- Odontosoria Fée (about 23 species)
- Osmolindsaea (K.U.Kramer) Lehtonen & Christenh. (about 7 species)
- Sphenomeris Maxon (3 species)
- Tapeinidium (C.Presl) C.Chr. (18 species)
- Xyropteris K.U.Kramer (1 species)

Other sources retain Xyropteris in Lindsaea.

The extinct genus Proodontosoria from the Cenomanian aged Burmese amber of Myanmar has been assigned to the family. Other fossil remains assigned to the family include an indeterminate leaf fragment also from the Burmese amber, as well as a permineralized root from the Albian aged Aspen Shale of Wyoming.

Other genera that have been placed in the Lindsaeaceae are:

- Lonchitis L. – transferred to its own family Lonchitidaceae
- Saccoloma Kaulf. – transferred to its own family Saccolomataceae
- Cystodium J.Sm. – transferred to its own family Cystodiaceae
