= 2025 in paleobotany =

Fossil plant research presented in 2025 includes new taxa that were described during the year, as well as other significant discoveries and events related to paleobotany that occurred in 2025.

== Algae ==
=== Charophytes ===
Name	Novelty	Status	Authors	Age	Unit	Location	Synonymized taxa	Notes	Images
Ovoidites rigidus	Sp. nov	Valid	Zavattieri & Gutiérrez	Late Triassic	Potrerillos Formation	Argentina		A zygnematacean green alga.	
Tarimochara	Gen. et sp. nov	Valid	Liu et al.	Ordovician (Katian)		China		A member of the family Charophyceae. Genus includes new species T. miraclensis.	

=== Chlorophytes ===
Name	Novelty	Status	Authors	Age	Unit	Location	Synonymized taxa	Notes	Images
Archaeobatophora gulliverensis	Sp. nov	Valid	LoDuca	Silurian (Telychian)	Schoolcraft Formation	United States (Michigan)			
Archaeodunaliella	Gen. et sp. nov		Zhu et al.	Carboniferous–Permian (Kasimovian–Asselian)	Fengcheng Formation	China		A member of the family Dunaliellaceae. The type species is A. junggarensis.	
Bakalovaella xizangensis	Comb. nov	Valid	(Mu)	Early Cretaceous (Aptian)	Langshan Formation	China		A member of Dasycladales belonging to the family Dasycladaceae; moved from Heteroporella xizangensis Mu (1986).	
Chaetomorphium	Gen. et sp. nov		Li & Zhang	Cambrian		China		A member of the total group of Cladophorales. Genus includes new species C. cambria.	
Earltonella swinehartii	Sp. nov	Valid	LoDuca	Silurian (Telychian)	Schoolcraft Formation	United States (Michigan)			
Goniolina tatrarum	Sp. nov	Valid	Barattolo & Bucur	Early Jurassic (Sinemurian-Pliensbachian)		Poland		A member of Dasycladales belonging to the family Bornetellaceae.	
Morelletpora sinica	Sp. nov	Valid	Schlagintweit, Xu & Zhang	Late Cretaceous (Campanian)	Yigeziya Formation	China		A member of Dasycladales belonging to the family Triploporellaceae.	
Schlagintweitella	Gen. et sp. nov	Valid	Bucur, Săsăran & Pleş	Late Jurassic (probably Tithonian)		Romania		A member of Dasycladales belonging to the family Triploporellaceae. The type species is S. inopinata.	
Similiclypeina langshanensis	Sp. nov	Valid	Sun, Schlagintweit & Li	Early Cretaceous (Aptian)	Langshan Formation	China		A member of Dasycladales belonging to the family Polyphysaceae.	
Suppiluliumaella schlagintweitii	Sp. nov	Valid	Barattolo et al.	Early Cretaceous		Romania		A member of Dasycladales.	
Triploporella loducai	Sp. nov	Valid	Barattolo et al.	Early Cretaceous		Romania		A member of Dasycladales.	

=== Rhodophytes ===
Name	Novelty	Status	Authors	Age	Unit	Location	Synonymized taxa	Notes	Images
Antiquifosliella	Gen. et sp. nov		Vinn in Vinn et al.	Ordovician (Katian)		Estonia		A red alga belonging to the family Corallinaceae. The type species is A. tinnae.	
Masloviporidium crassimuri	Sp. nov		Brenckle & Sheng	Carboniferous (Serpukhovian)	Kinkaid Limestone	United States (Illinois)		A red alga.	
Paleometapeyssonnelia	Gen. et 2 sp. nov		Zhuang et al.	Ordovician	Lianglitag Formation	China		A red alga belonging to the group Peyssonneliales. Genus includes new species P. gracilis and P. crassa.	
Vachardia	Gen. et sp. nov		Brenckle & Sheng	Carboniferous (Serpukhovian)	Kinkaid Limestone	United States (Illinois)		A red alga. The type species is V. multigena.	

=== Phycological research ===
- Martín-Closas et al. (2025) report the first discovery of fossil material of members of the genus Sycidium from the Upper Devonian of Armenia, providing new information on the morphology of the utricle of the studied charophyte.
- A study on the reproduction of Eugonophyllum, based on fossils from the Carboniferous (Gzhelian) Maping Formation (Guizhou, China), is published by Wang et al. (2025).
- Evidence from the study of molecular fossil steranes from the Lower Triassic strata from Xiakou (China) and Sverdrup Basin (Canada), indicative of reorganization of marine algal communities in the aftermath of the Permian–Triassic extinction event, is presented by Huang et al. (2025).
- Škaloud et al. publish genetics of European and punitive North American Mallomonas intermedia testing the assertion of the species as a paleoendemic. The living North American taxa were separated into a new species. The punitive M. intermedia fossils from the Eocene Horsefly shales of British Columbia were reclassified to †Mallomonas sp. and placed ancestral to the modern species group in conjunction with the Eocene Northwest Territories species †M. lancea and †M. dispar from the Giraffe Pipe locality.

== Non-vascular plants ==
=== Bryophyta ===
Name	Novelty	Status	Authors	Age	Unit	Location	Synonymized taxa	Notes	Images
Calymperites chenianus	Sp. nov		Li in Tan et al.	Cretaceous (Albian–Cenomanian)	Kachin amber	Myanmar		A member of the family Calymperaceae.	
Calymperites heinrichsianus	Sp. nov		Li & Wang in Li et al.	Cretaceous (Albian–Cenomanian)	Kachin amber	Myanmar		A member of the family Calymperaceae.	
Calymperites marginatus	Sp. nov		Li et al.	Cretaceous (Albian–Cenomanian)	Kachin amber	Myanmar		A member of the family Calymperaceae.	
Calymperites proboscideus	Sp. nov		Li in Tan et al.	Cretaceous (Albian–Cenomanian)	Kachin amber	Myanmar		A member of the family Calymperaceae.	
Calymperites striatus	Sp. nov		Li et al.	Cretaceous (Albian–Cenomanian)	Kachin amber	Myanmar		A member of the family Calymperaceae.	
Ditrichites aristatus	Sp. nov		Li in Tan et al.	Cretaceous (Albian–Cenomanian)	Kachin amber	Myanmar		A member of Dicranales sensu lato.	
Rovnohypnum	Gen. et sp. nov	Valid	Ignatov in Ignatov et al.	Eocene	Rovno amber	Ukraine		A moss belonging to the group Hypnales and the family Pylaisiadelphaceae. The type species is R. papillosum.	
Sematophyllites lanceolatus	Comb. nov	Valid	(Frahm)	Eocene	Baltic amber	Europe (Baltic Sea region)		A moss belonging to the family Sematophyllaceae; moved from Hypnites lanceolatus Frahm (2004).	
Sematophyllites lodziensis	Sp. nov	Valid	Wolski	Eocene	Baltic amber	Europe (Baltic Sea region)		A moss belonging to the family Sematophyllaceae.	
Sematophyllites subflagellaris	Comb. nov	Valid	(Caspary & Klebs)	Eocene	Baltic amber	Europe (Baltic Sea region)		A moss belonging to the family Sematophyllaceae; moved from Dicranites subflagellare Caspary & Klebs (1907).	
Tricosta angeiophoros	Sp. nov	Valid	Valois et al.	Early Cretaceous (Valanginian)		Canada (British Columbia)		A moss belonging to the family Tricostaceae. Published online in 2024; the final version of the article naming it was published in 2025.	

=== Marchantiophyta ===
Name	Novelty	Status	Authors	Age	Unit	Location	Synonymized taxa	Notes	Images
Corsiniopsis	Gen. et sp. nov		Flores & Cariglino	Late Triassic	Potrerillos Formation	Argentina		A liverwort belonging to the group Marchantiales. Genus includes new species C. kurtzii.	
Frullania chiapasensis	Sp. nov	Valid	Mamontov, Feldberg, Schäfer-Verwimp & Gradstein in Feldberg et al.	Miocene	Mexican amber	Mexico		A liverwort, a species of Frullania.	
Hyponychium	Gen. et sp. nov		Paulsen et al.	Eocene	Anglesea amber	Australia		A liverwort belonging to the group Jungermanniales. The type species is H. pentadactylum.	
Marchantites elegans	Comb. nov		(Barale & Ouaja)			Tunisia		Moved from Hepaticites elegans Barale & Ouaja (2002).	
Plagiochila ikiensis	Sp. nov	Valid	Katagiri	Miocene	Monobe Formation	Japan		A liverwort, a species of Plagiochila.	
Radula kachinensis	Sp. nov		Song, Ye & Wang	Cretaceous	Kachin amber	Myanmar		A liverwort, a species of Radula.	
Radula panduriformis	Sp. nov		Paulsen et al.	Eocene	Anglesea amber	Australia		A liverwort, a species of Radula.	
Ricciopsis pacltovae	Sp. nov		Veselá et al.	Late Cretaceous		Czech Republic		A liverwort.	
Thysananthus patrickmuelleri	Sp. nov	Valid	Feldberg, Gradstein, Schäfer-Verwimp & Mamontov in Feldberg et al.	Miocene	Mexican amber	Mexico		A liverwort belonging to the group Porellales and the family Lejeuneeae.	

=== Non-vascular plant research ===
- Evidence of impact of socio-economic and language factors on the documentation of bryophyte fossil record is presented by Blanco-Moreno, Bippus & Tomescu (2025).

== Lycophytes ==
Name	Novelty	Status	Authors	Age	Unit	Location	Synonymized taxa	Notes	Images
Franscinella	Gen. et comb. nov		Carniere, Pozzebon-Silva, Guerra-Sommer, Uhl, Jasper & Spiekermann in Carniere et al.	Permian		Brazil		A member of Lycopodiales; a new genus for "Lycopodites" riograndensis Salvi et al. (2008).	
Hueberia bainiuchangensis	Sp. nov		Hu et al.	Devonian (Pragian)	Posongchong Formation	China		A member of Drepanophycales.	
Selaginella jorelisiae	Sp. nov	Valid	López-García, Schmidt & Regalado in López-García et al.	Miocene	Dominican amber	Dominican Republic		A species of Selaginella.	
Staphylophyton	Gen. et sp. nov	Valid	Gensel et al.	Devonian (Emsian)		Canada (New Brunswick)		A zosterophyll. Genus includes new species S. semiglobosa. Published online in 2024; the final version of the article naming it was published in 2025.	
Zosterophyllum baoyangense	Sp. nov		Huang & Xue in Huang et al.	Devonian (Pragian)	Mangshan Group	China			
Zosterophyllum mangkeluense	Sp. nov		Wang et al.	Silurian (Přídolí)	Wutubulake Formation	China			

=== Lycophyte research ===
- Zavialova & Polevova (2025) review the distribution of multilamellated zones in spores of extant and fossil lycopsids, and interpret their presence as possible evidence of isoetalean affinity of fossil plants, while noting that their absence does not definitively exclude the possibly of affinities with this group.
- Wyman et al. (2025) study the morphology of the rooting system of Oxroadia and rootlet development in extant members of the genus Isoetes, and interpret the rooting systems of rhizomorphic lycopsids as unlikely to be leafy shoots modified for rooting early in the plant development.
- A study on leaf cushions of Sigillaria approximata, providing evidence of independent evolution of leaf abscission in arboreous lycopsids and in euphyllophytes, is published by D'Antonio (2025).

== Ferns and fern allies ==
Name	Novelty	Status	Authors	Age	Unit	Location	Synonymized taxa	Notes	Images
Arthropitys raimundii	Sp. nov	Valid	Rößler et al.	Permian	Leukersdorf Formation	Germany		A calamitalean. Published online in 2024; the final version of the article naming it was published in 2025.	
Asterophyllites lubnensis	Sp. nov		Cleal	Carboniferous	Kladno Formation	Czech Republic		A member of the family Calamitaceae.	
Claytosmunda basilica	Sp. nov		Hiller, Cheng & Bomfleur	Late Triassic		Antarctica		A member of the family Osmundaceae.	
Coniopteris baojishanensis	Sp. nov		Wei & Xin in Wei et al.	Middle Jurassic	Yaojie Formation	China		A member of the family Dicksoniaceae.	
Coniopteris haifanggouensis	Sp. nov		Li & Tian in Li et al.	Middle Jurassic	Haifanggou Formation	China		A member of the family Dicksoniaceae.	
Cyathocarpus polinensis	Sp. nov		Rodriguez Rizk & Cariglino	Permian (Guadalupian)	La Golondrina Formation	Argentina		A member of Marattiales belonging to the family Psaroniaceae.	
Dicksonia hallei	Sp. nov		Hermsen et al.	Early Cretaceous (Albian)	Kachaike Formation	Argentina		A species of Dicksonia.	
Equisetum shandongensis	Sp. nov		Jin et al.	Early Cretaceous	Laiyang Formation	China		A species of Equisetum.	
Escuderia	Gen. et sp. nov		Nishida et al.	Cretaceous (Albian–Cenomanian)	Possibly Williams Point Beds	Antarctica		A member of the family Schizaeaceae. Genus includes new species E. livingstonensis.	
Hexaphyllostrobus negauneeana	Sp. nov		D'Antonio et al.	Carboniferous (Moscovian)	Mazon Creek fossil beds	United States (Illinois)		A sphenophyll cone.	
Irizaripteris	Gen. et sp. nov	Valid	Iglesias et al.	Paleocene	Cross Valley-Wiman Formation	Antarctica		A member of the family Dryopteridaceae belonging to the subfamily Dryopteridoideae. Genus includes new species I. antarcticus.	
Krameropteris calophyllum	Sp. nov		Li in Li & Meng	Late Cretaceous (Cenomanian)	Kachin amber	Myanmar		A member of the family Dennstaedtiaceae.	
Millerocaulis santamartaensis	Sp. nov		Koppelhus et al.	Late Cretaceous	Snow Hill Island Formation	Antarctica		A member of the family Osmundaceae.	
Polystichum espinarensis	Sp. nov	Valid	Aliaga-Castillo et al.	Pliocene		Peru		A species of Polystichum. Published online in 2025; the final version of the article naming it was published in 2026.	
Rhabdopteris	Gen. et sp. nov		Hermsen et al.	Late Cretaceous (Maastrichtian)	La Colonia Formation	Argentina		A fern, probably with affinities with Thyrsopteridaceae. Genus includes new species R. chubutensis.	
Salvinia indica	Sp. nov		Ali & Khan in Ali et al.	Paleocene–Eocene	Subathu Formation	India		A species of Salvinia.	
Shaolinopteris	Gen. et sp. nov		Tian et al.	Middle Jurassic	Xinmin Formation	China		A member of the family Dennstaedtiaceae. The type species is S. zhengii.	

=== Pteridological research ===
- Redescription and a study on the phylogenetic affinities of Pseudobornia ursina is published by Rastier et al. (2025).
- New fossil material of Nemejcopteris haiwangii, providing evidence of climbing on Psaronius tree hosts, is described from Permian strata of the Taiyuan Formation in the Wuda Coalfield (Inner Mongolia, China) by Li et al. (2025).
- Evidence from the study of fossils of members of Psaroniaceae from the Permian Wuda Tuff Flora (China), indicative of presence of structures homologous with stipules of extant members of Marattiales, is presented by Zhou et al. (2025).
- Branched networks of tubules interpreted as probable root fossils of herbaceous leptosporangiate ferns are described from the Middle-Upper Triassic strata in Somerset (United Kingdom) by Howson, Tucker & Whitaker (2025).

== Conifers ==
=== Araucariaceae ===
Name	Novelty	Status	Authors	Age	Unit	Location	Synonymized taxa	Notes	Images
Araucaria gansuensis	Sp. nov		Li & Du in Li et al.	Early Cretaceous (Aptian to Albian)	Zhonggou Formation	China		A species of Araucaria.	

=== Cheirolepidiaceae ===
Name	Novelty	Status	Authors	Age	Unit	Location	Synonymized taxa	Notes	Images
Classostrobus minutus	Sp. nov	Valid	Pfeiler, Matsunaga & Atkinson	Late Cretaceous (Campanian)	Ladd Formation	United States (California)		Published online in 2024; the final version of the article naming it was published in 2025.	
Frenelopsis callapezii	Sp. nov	Valid	Kvaček, Mendes & Van Konijnenburg-van Cittert	Early Cretaceous	Figueira da Foz Formation	Portugal		Published online in 2024; the final version of the article naming it was published in 2025.	

=== Cupressaceae ===
Name	Novelty	Status	Authors	Age	Unit	Location	Synonymized taxa	Notes	Images
Athrosequoia	Gen. et sp. nov		Pfeiler, Ortiz & Tomescu in Pfeiler et al.	Early Cretaceous (Barremian/Aptian)	Budden Canyon Formation	United States (California)		Woody seed cone of a member of Cupressaceae. Genus includes new species A. walkeri.	
Stutzeliastrobus araucarioides	Comb. nov		(Tan & Zhu)	Early Cretaceous	Guyang Formation	China		Moved from Elatides araucarioides Tan & Zhu (1982)	

=== Pinaceae ===
Name	Novelty	Status	Authors	Age	Unit	Location	Synonymized taxa	Notes	Images
Lesbosoxylon zourosii	Sp. nov		Zhu & Wang in Zhu et al.	Miocene	Sigri Pyroclastic Formation	Greece			
Piceoxylon jarudense	Sp. nov		Yin et al.	Early Cretaceous	Huolinhe Formation	China			
Pinus longlingensis	Sp. nov		Song & Wu in Song et al.	Pliocene	Mangbang Formation	China		A pine.	
Pinus mangkangensis	Sp. nov		Yao & Su in Yao et al.	Eocene	Mangkang Basin	China		A pine.	
Pinuxylon anatolica	Sp. nov		Akkemik & Mantzouka	Miocene	Hançili Formation	Turkey		A member of the family Pinaceae.	
Pinuxylon shandongense	Sp. nov		Hao, Jiang, Tian & Wang in Hao et al.	Early Cretaceous	Jiaolai Basin	China			
Tsuga zhuoziensis	Sp. nov	Valid	Xiao et al.	Miocene	Hannuoba Formation	China		A species of Tsuga. Announced online in 2025; the final version of the article naming it was published in 2026.	

=== Podocarpaceae ===
Name	Novelty	Status	Authors	Age	Unit	Location	Synonymized taxa	Notes	Images
Dacrycarpoides	Gen. et sp. nov		Patel, Cantrill & Leslie in Patel et al.	Miocene		New Caledonia		The type species is D. neocaledonica.	
Metapodocarpoxylon brasiliense	Sp. nov		Conceição et al.		Missão Velha Formation	Brazil			

=== Taxaceae ===
Name	Novelty	Status	Authors	Age	Unit	Location	Synonymized taxa	Notes	Images
Palaeotorreya	Gen. et sp. nov		Wang, Dong & Shi in Wang et al.	Early Cretaceous	Huolinhe Formation	China		Genus includes new species P. shenghuii.	

=== Conifer research ===
- Gou, Jiang & Liu (2025) study the phylogenetic affinities of fossil stems Ductoagathoxylon wangii, Protophyllocladoxylon yiwuense, Yiwupitys elegans and Agathoxylon sp. from the Yiwu Jurassic Forest (Xinjiang, China), recovering them as closely related to extant Araucariaceae.
- Howell, Rößler & Gee (2025) study the morphology of cones of Araucaria mirabilis from the Middle Jurassic La Matilde Formation (Argentina), and determine characteristics resulting in optimal seed packing of the studied cones.
- Gee, Xie & Howell (2025) describe silicified wood and coalified tree trunks of Agathoxylon hoodii associated with seed cones, seeds, pollen cones and leaved twigs of Araucaria delevoryasii from the Upper Jurassic strata of the Morrison Formation from the Howe-Stephens Quarry (Wyoming, United States), and interpret the studied fossils as parts of the same plant, referred to as the Araucaria delevoryasii tree.
- Sagasti et al. (2025) describe conifer wood (likely Cupressinoxylon) from the Upper Jurassic strata in Scotland (United Kingdom), preserving evidence of breakdown of wood by fungal rot, arthropod borings and eventual colonization by plant roots, and representing the first known case of a Jurassic nurse log from the Northern Hemisphere.
- Yang et al. (2025) describe new fossil material of Sequoia maguanensis from the Eocene-Oligocene Huazhige Formation (Yunnan, China), and reconstruct changes of distribution of members of the genus Sequoia from the Paleocene to the Pliocene.
- Evidence of preservation of cells with nuclei is reported in Mirovia macrophylla from the Lower Cretaceous strata of the Lena Coal Basin (Sakha Republic, Russia) by Ozerov et al. (2025).
- A new plant assemblage, including only conifer fossils, is described from the Lower Cretaceous (Aptian) strata of the Paja Formation from Vélez, Santander (central Colombia) by Palma-Castro, Benavides-Cabra & Herrera (2025).
- Tian et al. (2025) describe parasitic fungi infecting a podocarpaceous wood specimen from the Lower Cretaceous Yixian Formation (China), and report evidence of tylosis formation in the studied wood interpreted as a defense response to the fungal infection.

== Gnetophyta ==
Name	Novelty	Status	Authors	Age	Unit	Location	Synonymized taxa	Notes	Images
Ephedra transversa	Sp. nov		Song & Wu in Li et al.	Early Cretaceous	Yixian Formation	China		A species of Ephedra.	

== Flowering plants ==
=== Magnoliids ===
Name	Novelty	Status	Authors	Age	Unit	Location	Synonymized taxa	Notes	Images
Cryptocarya makumensis	Sp. nov		Bhatia & Srivastava	Oligocene		India		A species of Cryptocarya.	
Cryptocaryoxylon istanbulensis	Sp. nov	Valid	Akkemik & Üner	Late Oligocene–Early Miocene	İstanbul Formation	Turkey		Fossil wood of a member of the family Lauraceae.	
Laurinoxylon americanum	Comb. nov		(Petriella)	Paleocene	Cerro Bororó Formation	Argentina		Moved from Bridelioxylon americanum Petriella (1972).	
Longexylon	Gen. et sp. nov		Pujana et al.	Late Cretaceous	Snow Hill Island Formation	Antarctica		Fossil wood of a member of the family Lauraceae. Genus includes new species L. oliveroi.	
Magnolia dorotheae	Sp. nov	Valid	Kunzmann et al.	Eocene		Germany		A species of Magnolia. Published online in 2024; the final version of the article naming it was published in 2025.	
Magnolia geinitzii	Comb. nov	Valid	(Engelhardt)	Miocene		Germany		A species of Magnolia; moved from Livistona geinitzii Engelhardt (1870).	
Magnoliaceoxylon africanum	Sp. nov		El-Noamani et al.	Late Cretaceous (Campanian)	Quseir Formation	Egypt		Fossil wood of a member of the family Magnoliaceae.	

==== Magnoliid research ====
- Beurel et al. (2025) study the phylogenetic affinities of Nothophylica piloburmensis, and recover it as a member of Laurales related to the families Lauraceae and Hernandiaceae.

=== Monocots ===
==== Alismatales ====
Name	Novelty	Status	Authors	Age	Unit	Location	Synonymized taxa	Notes	Images
Maresurculus	Gen. et sp. nov		Yamada	Miocene	Morozaki Group	Japan		Seagrass with probable affinities with Cymodoceaceae. Genus includes new species M. aichiensis.	
Potamogeton crispissima	Comb. nov	Valid	(Dusén)	Paleocene	Cross Valley-Wiman Formation	Antarctica		A species of Potamogeton.	
Thalassites morozakiensis	Sp. nov		Yamada	Miocene	Morozaki Group	Japan		Seagrass with probable affinities with Hydrocharitaceae.	
Thalassotaenia notophyllum	Sp. nov		Panti in Panti et al.	Miocene	Gaiman Formation	Argentina		Seagrass belonging to the family Hydrocharitaceae.	

==== Arecales ====
Name	Novelty	Status	Authors	Age	Unit	Location	Synonymized taxa	Notes	Images
Palmoxylon trachycarpeaeense	Sp. nov		Kumar & Khan in Kumar, Spicer & Khan	Cretaceous-Paleocene (Maastrichtian-Danian)	Deccan Intertrappean Beds	India		Fossil wood of a member of the family Arecaceae belonging to the subfamily Coryphoideae and the tribe Trachycarpeae.	
Rhizopalmoxylon arecoides	Sp. nov	Valid	Kumar & Khan in Kumar, Spicer & Khan	Cretaceous-Paleocene (Maastrichtian-Danian)	Deccan Intertrappean Beds	India		Root mat of a member of the family Arecaceae belonging to the subfamily Arecoideae.	

==== Liliales ====
Name	Novelty	Status	Authors	Age	Unit	Location	Synonymized taxa	Notes	Images
Ripogonum marambio	Sp. nov	Valid	Iglesias et al.	Paleocene	Cross Valley-Wiman Formation	Antarctica		A species of Ripogonum.	

==== Poales ====
Name	Novelty	Status	Authors	Age	Unit	Location	Synonymized taxa	Notes	Images
Bolboschoenus weberi	Sp. nov	Valid	White & Morgan	Pleistocene		United States (New Mexico)		A species of Bolboschoenus.	
Chimonobambusa manipurensis	Sp. nov		Bhatia & Srivastava in Bhatia et al.	Pleistocene		India		A species of Chimonobambusa.	
Ventriculmus	Gen. et sp. nov		Bhatia & Srivastava in Bhatia et al.	Miocene		India		A bamboo. The type species is V. neyvelinensis.	

==== Monocot research ====
- Evidence from a fossil-calibrated phylogeny of palms, indicating that diversification rates of palms changed during global warming and cooling events from the mid-Cretaceous to the end of the Oligocene, is presented by Yao et al. (2025).
- Khan et al. (2025) describe fossil material of palms with one metaxylem vessel in each fibrovascular bundle from the Maastrichtian-Danian Deccan Intertrappean Beds (India), and interpret the studied fossils as Cocos-type palms belonging to the subfamily Arecoideae that likely grew in a tropical rainforest.
- Evidence from the study of phytoliths from the Giraffe locality (Northwest Territories, Canada), indicative of presence of palms close to the Arctic Circle over an extensive period of time during the Eocene (approximately 48 million years ago), is presented by Siver et al. (2025).
- Halamski et al. (2025) redescribe and provide a new whole plant reconstruction of Rhizocaulon huberi.
- Jacobs et al. (2025) describe phytoliths of members of Pharoideae from the Miocene strata in Ethiopia and a leaf with similarities to leaves of extant members of the genera Leptaspis and Scrotochloa from the Miocene strata in Kenya, providing evidence of presence of the group in African forests by the early Miocene.

=== Basal eudicots ===
Name	Novelty	Status	Authors	Age	Unit	Location	Synonymized taxa	Notes	Images
Appianocarpa	Gen. et sp. nov	Valid	Rico et al.	Eocene		Canada (British Columbia)		A member of the family Menispermaceae. Genus includes new species A. canadense. Announced in 2025; the final version of the article naming it was published in 2026.	
Ettingshausenia geistthalensis	Sp. nov		Kvaček, Messner & Bernhard	Late Cretaceous	Gosau Group	Austria		Platanoid foliage.	
Palaeosinomenium indicum	Sp. nov		Kumar, Manchester & Khan	Cretaceous-Paleocene (Maastrichtian-Danian)	Deccan Intertrappean Beds	India		A member of the family Menispermaceae. Announced in late 2024, published fully in 2025.	
Proteaceaefolia	Gen. et sp. nov		Carpenter & McLoughlin	Paleogene		Chile		A member of the family Proteaceae. The type species is P. araucoensis.	
Tetracentron linchensis	Sp. nov		Manchester	Paleocene	Fort Union Formation	United States (Wyoming)		A species of Tetracentron.	

==== Basal eudicot research ====
- A study on the phylogenetic relationships and evolutionary history of members of Cissampelideae, as indicated by morphology of endocarps of extant and fossil taxa as well as by molecular data, is published by Lian, Zhang & Wang (2025).

=== Superasterids ===
==== Apiales ====
Name	Novelty	Status	Authors	Age	Unit	Location	Synonymized taxa	Notes	Images
Astropanax eogetem	Sp. nov		Pan et al.	Miocene	Mush Valley Formation	Ethiopia		A species of Astropanax.	
Caffapanax	Gen. et sp. nov		Wilf	Eocene (Ypresian)	Huitrera Formation	Argentina		Leaf fossils of a member of the family Araliaceae. The type species is C. canessae.	
Davidsaralia	Gen. et sp. nov		Wilf	Eocene (Ypresian)	Huitrera Formation	Argentina		Infructescence of a member of the family Araliaceae. The type species is D. christophae.	

==== Aquifoliales ====
Name	Novelty	Status	Authors	Age	Unit	Location	Synonymized taxa	Notes	Images
Ilex beihaiensis	Sp. nov		Niu in Niu et al.	Miocene	Foluo Formation	China		A holly.	

==== Cornales ====
Name	Novelty	Status	Authors	Age	Unit	Location	Synonymized taxa	Notes	Images
Davidia indica	Sp. nov	Valid	Ali, Su & Khan in Ali et al.	Eocene		India		A species of Davidia. Published online in 2025; the final version of the article naming it was published in 2026.	

==== Ericales ====
Name	Novelty	Status	Authors	Age	Unit	Location	Synonymized taxa	Notes	Images
Sandrawia	Gen. et sp. nov	Valid	Tiffney et al.	Paleocene	Fort Union Formation	United States (Wyoming)		A fossil fruits with closest similarity to fruits of members of the family Ericaceae. Genus includes new species S. scottii.	
Sideroxylon globosum	Sp. nov		(Ludwig)	Miocene		Germany	Sapindus lignitum Unger (1860)	A species of Sideroxylon; moved from Trapa globosa Ludwig (1860).	
Sideroxylon margaritiferum	Comb. nov		(Ludwig)	Miocene		Germany		A species of Sideroxylon; moved from Taxus margaritifera Ludwig (1860).	
Sideroxylon ruminatiusculum	Sp. nov		Martinetto et al.	Miocene and Pliocene		Italy		A species of Sideroxylon.	

==== Gentianales ====
Name	Novelty	Status	Authors	Age	Unit	Location	Synonymized taxa	Notes	Images
Mesechitespermum	Gen. et sp. nov		Alvarado-Cárdenas et al.	Miocene	Mexican amber	Mexico		A member of the family Apocynaceae. The type species is M. endressiorum.	

==== Icacinales ====
Name	Novelty	Status	Authors	Age	Unit	Location	Synonymized taxa	Notes	Images
Miquelia yenbaiensis	Sp. nov		Hung, Huang & Li in Hung et al.	Miocene	Co Phuc Formation	Vietnam		A species of Miquelia.	

=== Superrosids ===
==== Fabales ====
Name	Novelty	Status	Authors	Age	Unit	Location	Synonymized taxa	Notes	Images
Bauhinia sanshuiensis	Sp. nov		Wu et al.	Paleocene	Sanshui Basin	China		A species of Bauhinia sensu lato.	
Peltophorum xingjianii	Sp. nov		Zhao, Wang & Huang in Zhao et al.	Miocene	Sanhaogou Formation	China		A species of Peltophorum.	
Podocarpium minicum	Sp. nov		Xie & Yan in Xie et al.	Oligocene	Qaidam Basin	China			
Pueraria qinghaiensis	Sp. nov		Cao & Xie in Cao et al.	Miocene	Youshashan Formation	China		A species of Pueraria.	

==== Fagales ====
Name	Novelty	Status	Authors	Age	Unit	Location	Synonymized taxa	Notes	Images
Carya nux-taurinensis	Comb. nov		(Brongniart)	Miocene and Pliocene		Germany; Italy	Juglans globosa Ludwig (1857)	A hickory; moved from Juglans nux-taurinensis Brongniart (1822).	
Fagus aculeata	Sp. nov		Zdravchev, Maslova, Kodrul & Jin in Maslova et al.	Miocene		China		A beech.	
Fagus glabra	Sp. nov		Maslova, Tekleva & Jin in Maslova et al.	Miocene		China		A beech.	
Fagus tengxianensis	Sp. nov		Maslova, Kodrul & Jin in Maslova et al.	Miocene		China		A beech.	
Hexagonokaryon	Gen. et sp. nov	Valid	Manchester et al.	Paleocene		United States (Wyoming)		A member of the family Fagaceae. Genus includes new species H. nixonii. Published online in 2025; the final version of the article naming it was published in 2026.	
Myricoxylon unalakkemikii	Sp. nov	Valid	Çelik	Miocene	Hançili Formation	Turkey		A member of the family Myricaceae.	
Ostrya parajaponica	Sp. nov		Huang & Jia in Huang et al.	Eocene	Bailuyuan Formation	China		A species of Ostrya.	

==== Malpighiales ====
Name	Novelty	Status	Authors	Age	Unit	Location	Synonymized taxa	Notes	Images
Calophyllum beihaiensis	Sp. nov		Huang & Jia in Tang et al.	Miocene	Foluo Formation	China		A species of Calophyllum.	
Eogarcinia	Gen. et sp. nov	Valid	Ali, Almeida & Khan in Ali et al.	Eocene		India		Fossil flowers with affinities with Garcinia. Genus includes new species E. longistaminata. Published online in 2025; the final version of the article naming it was published in 2026.	
Eomalpighia	Gen. et sp. nov		Ali, Almeida & Khan in Ali et al.	Eocene	Palana Formation	India		A member of the family Malpighiaceae. The type species is E. indica.	
Mammea martinezii	Sp. nov		Mejia-Roldan et al.	Eocene (Bartonian)	Tepetate Formation	Mexico		A species of Mammea.	
Tetrapterys dolgopolae	Sp. nov	Valid	Siegert, Gandolfo & Wilf	Eocene	Laguna del Hunco Formation	Argentina		A species of Tetrapterys.	
Thryallis eocenicus	Sp. nov		Ali, Patel & Khan in Ali et al.	Eocene		India		A species of Thryallis.	

==== Malvales ====
Name	Novelty	Status	Authors	Age	Unit	Location	Synonymized taxa	Notes	Images
Tilia magnasepala	Sp. nov		Geier & Schönenberger in Geier et al.	Oligocene (Chattian)	Enspel Formation	Germany		A species of Tilia.	

==== Myrtales ====
Name	Novelty	Status	Authors	Age	Unit	Location	Synonymized taxa	Notes	Images
Lagerstroemia himachalensis	Sp. nov	Valid	Prasad, Singh & Singh	Miocene		India		A species of Lagerstroemia.	

==== Rosales ====
Name	Novelty	Status	Authors	Age	Unit	Location	Synonymized taxa	Notes	Images
Ampaloxylon	Gen. et sp. nov		Gentis et al.	Paleogene		Myanmar		A member of the family Moraceae. Genus includes A. ficoides	
Milicioxylon afromoroides	Sp. nov		Gentis et al.	Paleogene		Myanmar		A member of the family Moraceae.	
Prunus tonyzhangii	Sp. nov	Valid	Wheeler, Manchester & Baas	Eocene	John Day Formation	United States (Oregon)		A species of Prunus.	

==== Sapindales ====
Name	Novelty	Status	Authors	Age	Unit	Location	Synonymized taxa	Notes	Images
Acer pretataricum	Sp. nov		Xiao & Wang in Dong et al.	Miocene	Hannuoba Formation	China		A maple.	
Canarium siwalica	Sp. nov	Valid	Prasad, Singh & Singh	Miocene		India		A species of Canarium.	
Chisocheton himachalensis	Sp. nov	Valid	Ranjan, Prasad & Singh	Miocene		India		A species of Chisocheton.	
Entandrophragminium pacei	Sp. nov		Gentis et al.	Paleogene		Myanmar			
Nothopegia oligocastaneifolia	Sp. nov		Bhatia & Srivastava	Oligocene	Tikak Parbat Formation	India		A species of Nothopegia.	
Nothopegia oligotravancorica	Sp. nov		Bhatia & Srivastava	Oligocene	Tikak Parbat Formation	India		A species of Nothopegia.	
Pteleoidea	Gen. et comb. nov	Valid	Lopez del Rincon & Manchester	Paleocene	Fort Union Formation	United States (Wyoming)		Winged fruits with possible affinities with Rutaceae. The type species is "Koelreuteria" annosa Brown (1956).	
Swietenia siwalika	Sp. nov	Valid	Ranjan, Prasad & Singh	Miocene		India		A species of Swietenia.	
Uintacarpa	Gen. et sp. nov	Valid	Manchester, Judd & Tiffney	Eocene	Green River Formation	United States (Utah)		A Sapindalean fruit of uncertain affinity. Likely belonging to Simaroubaceae or Rutaceae. Genus includes new species U. alata. Announced in 2025; the final version of the article naming it was published in 2026.	
Zanthoxylum maii	Comb. nov	Valid	(Gregor)	Miocene		Germany		A species of Zanthoxylum; moved from Toddalia maii Gregor (1975).	
Zanthoxylum naviculaeforme	Comb. nov	Valid	(Reid)	Miocene		France		A species of Zanthoxylum; moved from Martya naviculaeformis Reid (1923).	
Zanthoxylum turovense	Comb. nov	Valid	(Czeczott & Skirgiełło)	Miocene		Poland		A species of Zanthoxylum; moved from Sapoticarpum turovense Czeczott & Skirgiełło (1975).	

==== Other superrosids ====
Name	Novelty	Status	Authors	Age	Unit	Location	Synonymized taxa	Notes	Images
Scalarifructus	Gen. et comb. nov		Manchester et al.	Eocene	Green River Formation	United States; Colorado		Fruits of a superrosid, possibly a Brassicalean. The type species is "Danaea" coloradensis Knowlton (1923).	Scalarifructus coloradensis

==== Superrosid research ====
- Ali et al. (2025) describe a gland-bearing petal of cf. Mcvaughia sp. from the Eocene Palana Formation (India), interpreted as possible evidence that members of the lineage of the studied plant already had volatile glands used to attract pollinators (possibly anthophorid bees) in the early Eocene.
- Hazra & Khan (2025) report the discovery of a diverse assemblage of legume fruits and leaflet remains from the Rajdanda Formation (India), interpreted as evidence of the presence of a warm and humid tropical environment during the Pliocene.
- Leaflets of Sindora cf. siamensis representing the first unequivocal macrofossil record of members of the genus Sindora are described from the Pleistocene strata of the Kon Tum Formation (Vietnam) by Wang et al. (2025).
- A study on the anatomy of wood of extant members of the genus Ficus and fossil wood with affinities to Ficus, and on its implications for determination of the organs preserved as fossil wood and their habits, is published by Monje Dussán, Pederneiras & Angyalossy (2025).
- Bastias-Silva et al. (2025) describe leaf fossils of members of the genus Nothofagus from the strata of the Cape Melville Formation from King George Island, providing evidence of presence of Nothofagus-dominated tundra-like forests in West Antarctica during the early Miocene.
- A study on the phylogenetic relationships of extant and extinct Nothofagus trees, and on the evolution of morphological traits previously used in delimitation of species belonging to this genus, is published by Vento et al. (2025).
- Hamersma et al. (2025) revise Sahnianthus parijai from the Deccan Intertrappean Beds, interpret it as a member or a relative of the family Lythraceae, and identify Chitaleypushpam mohgaonense, Deccananthus savitrii, Raoanthus intertrappea, Flosfemina intertrappea, Flosvirulis deccanensis, Menispermaceopushpam amanganjii, Liliaceopushpam deccanii, Lythraceopushpam mohgaoense and Surangepushpam deccanii as junior synonyms of S. parijai.
- A leaf of Swintonia floribunda, representing the oldest record of the genus Swintonia reported to date, is described from the Oligocene Tikak Parbat Formation (India) by Bhatia & Srivastava (2025), who interpret this finding as supporting the Gondwanan origin of the Anacardiaceae.
- Chen et al. (2025) describe fossil material of Toddalia nanlinensis from the Yangyi Formation (Yunnan, China), extending known temporal range of the species into the latest Miocene and providing evidence of a warm, humid climate and presence of forest vegetation in the Baoshan Basin at the time.
- The first fossil material assigned to a living endangered tropical tree species (Dryobalanops rappa) is described from the Plio-Pleistocene strata from Brunei by Wang et al. (2025).

=== Other angiosperms ===
Name	Novelty	Status	Authors	Age	Unit	Location	Synonymized taxa	Notes	Images
Antiquigemina	Gen. et sp. nov		Wang & Li in Li, Huang & Wang	Late Cretaceous (Cenomanian)	Kachin amber	Myanmar		A eudicot of uncertain affinities. The type species is A. pilosa.	
Arthayesia	Gen. et sp. nov	Valid	Wilder & Manchester	Paleocene	Fort Union Formation	United States (Montana)		A flowering plant of uncertain affinities. The type species is A. brevipetiolata.	
Birneyphyllum	Gen. et sp. nov	Valid	Wilder & Manchester	Paleocene	Fort Union Formation	United States (Montana)		A flowering plant of uncertain affinities. The type species is B. lobata.	
Jinjianhuaia	Gen. et sp. nov	Valid	Wilder & Manchester	Paleocene	Fort Union Formation	United States (Montana)		A flowering plant of uncertain affinities. The type species is J. birneyensis.	
Juglandiphyllites graefii	Sp. nov		Kvaček, Messner & Bernhard	Late Cretaceous	Gosau Group	Austria		Dicotyledon leaves.	
Juglandiphyllites kainachensis	Sp. nov		Kvaček, Messner & Bernhard	Late Cretaceous	Gosau Group	Austria		Dicotyledon leaves.	
Juglandiphyllites roemaskogelensis	Sp. nov		Kvaček, Messner & Bernhard	Late Cretaceous	Gosau Group	Austria		Dicotyledon leaves.	
Kodrulia	Gen. et sp. nov	Valid	Wilder & Manchester	Paleocene	Fort Union Formation	United States (Montana)		A flowering plant of uncertain affinities. The type species is K. birneyensis.	
Linguaflumenia	Gen. et sp. nov	Valid	Wilder & Manchester	Paleocene	Fort Union Formation	United States (Montana)		A flowering plant of uncertain affinities. The type species is L. montanensis.	
Lingyuanfructus	Gen. et sp. nov		Wang	Early Cretaceous (Barremian–Aptian)	Yixian Formation	China		A possible early flowering plant. The type species is L. hibrida.	
Maniastrum	Gen. et sp. nov	Valid	Wilder & Manchester	Paleocene	Fort Union Formation	United States (Montana)		A flowering plant of uncertain affinities. The type species is M. decastamenus.	
Menispermites temlyanensis	Sp. nov		Zolina, Golovneva & Grabovskiy	Late Cretaceous–Paleocene (Maastrichtian–Danian)	Tanyurer Formation	Russia (Chukotka Autonomous Okrug)		A flowering plant with similarities to members of the genus Menispermum.	
Patagoflora	Gen. et sp. nov		Nunes et al.	Early Cretaceous (Albian)	Cerro Barcino Formation	Argentina		An early flowering plant. The type species is P. minima.	
Spinograna	Gen. et sp. nov		Wang & Huang	Cretaceous (Albian–Cenomanian)	Kachin amber	Myanmar		A fruit with seeds of a flowering plant. The type species is S. myanmarensis.	
Stellula	Gen. et sp. nov		Puebla & Prámparo	Early Cretaceous	La Cantera Formation	Argentina		An early flowering plant, possibly with affinities with Ranunculales. The type species is S. meridionalis.	

=== General angiosperm research ===
- A study on the timing of the evolution of the flowering plants is published by Ma et al. (2025), who recover the crown group of the flowering plants as likely originating in the Triassic.
- Clark & Donoghue (2025) study the impact of interpretations of the plant fossil record on molecular clock estimates of the timing of origin of the flowering plants, and estimate that the crown group of the flowering plants diverged in the Late Jurassic–Early Cretaceous interval.
- Ding et al. (2025) review fossil and molecular evidence of origin and development of floras dominated by flowering plants, and identify five major phases of the studied process.
- Mendes et al. (2025) study the ultrastructure of pollen of Saportanthus, interpret the studied angiosperm as the sister taxon of monocots, and support placement of Jamesrosea and Lovellea within Laurales.
- Huang & Wang (2025) report the discovery of diverse winged and wingless seeds concentrated within Cretaceous amber from Myanmar, resembling dust seeds observed in extant orchids and interpreted as likely originating from a single fruit.
- Doughty et al. (2025) use a mechanistic model to study the relationship between seed size of flowering plants, their light environment and the size of animals in their environment, and predict a rapid increase of seed size during the Paleocene that eventually plateaued or declined, likely as a result of the appearance of large herbivores that opened the understory, reducing the competitive advantage of plants with large seeds.
- Cham et al. (2025) develop a method for reconstructing the rate of carbon assimilation in leaves, and apply it to Miocene flowering plants from the Clarkia fossil beds (Idaho, United States).
- Evidence from the study of leaves of extant trees from the Nantahala National Forest (North Carolina, United States), indicative of utility of analyses of leaf traits for reconstructions of successional dynamics of fossil plants, is presented by Lowe et al. (2025).

== Other plants ==
Name	Novelty	Status	Authors	Age	Unit	Location	Synonymized taxa	Notes	Images
Adiantites lilingensis	Sp. nov		Li et al.	Carboniferous (Mississippian)	Zhangshuwan Formation	China			
Barrealoxylon	Gen. et sp. nov		Conde et al.	Carboniferous	Pituil Formation	Argentina		A probable member of Cordaitales. Genus includes new species B. nelsonii.	
Blanzyopteris feistmantelii	Comb. nov	Valid	(Šimůnek)	Carboniferous (Kasimovian)	Slaný Formation	Czech Republic		A probable member of Medullosales; moved from "Neuropteris pseudoblissii" forma feistmanteli Šimůnek (1988).	
Bomfleuranthus	Gen. et sp. nov		Villalva & Gnaedinger	Triassic	Cañadón Largo Formation	Argentina		A microsporangiate cone of a member of Peltaspermales. Genus includes new species B. scytoconnexus.	
Fengweioxylon	Gen. et sp. nov	Valid	Jiang et al.	Jurassic	Tiaojishan Formation	China		Fossil wood of a corystosperm. The type species is F. sinense.	
Jarudia borealis	Sp. nov		Nosova et al.	Early Cretaceous (Aptian–Albian)	Balyktakh Formation	Russia (Sakha Republic)		A cupule-bearing seed cone of a member of Doyleales.	
Karkenia bracteata	Sp. nov		Frolov, Enushchenko & Mashchuk	Early Jurassic		Russia		A member of Ginkgoales belonging to the family Karkeniaceae.	
Neuromariopteris	Gen. et sp. nov		Šimůnek & Haldovský	Carboniferous (Bashkirian)	Kladno-Rakovník Basin	Czech Republic		A member of Callistophytales. The type species is N. scandens.	
Nuvensia	Gen. et sp. nov		Silva, Batista, Conceição, Kunzmann & Gobo in Silva et al.	Early Cretaceous	Crato Formation	Brazil		A seed plant of uncertain affinities. The type species is N. palaeobrasiliana.	
Ohaniella	Gen. et sp. nov	Valid	Pott & Takimoto	Late Jurassic (Oxfordian)	Tochikubo Formation	Japan		A member of Bennettitales belonging to the family Williamsoniaceae. The type species is O. ptilofolia.	
Palaeopteridium andrenelii	Sp. nov		Correia & Góis-Marques	Carboniferous (Moscovian)		Portugal		A progymnosperm belonging to the group Noeggerathiales.	
Paratingia fuyuanensis	Sp. nov		Qin, He & Wang in Qin et al.	Permian (Lopingian)	Xuanwei Formation	China		A member of Noeggerathiales belonging to the family Dorsalistachyaceae.	
Paratingia qingyunensis	Sp. nov		Qin, He & Wang in Qin et al.	Permian (Lopingian)	Xuanwei Formation	China		A member of Noeggerathiales belonging to the family Dorsalistachyaceae.	
Phoenicopsis arcticus	Sp. nov		Nosova et al.	Early Cretaceous (Aptian–Albian)	Balyktakh Formation	Russia (Sakha Republic)		Leaves associated with Jarudia borealis.	
Planoxylon toitoii	Nom. nov		Philippe et al.	Mesozoic, possibly Jurassic		New Zealand		A replacement name for Araucarioxylon australe Crié (1889).	
Pseudotorellia solida	Sp. nov	Valid	Barbacka & Pacyna in Barbacka et al.	Late Jurassic (Kimmeridgian)	Skarbek Oolitic Limestone	Poland		A gymnosperm belonging to the family Pseudotorelliaceae.	
Quebradophyllum	Gen. et sp. nov	Valid	Hunt et al.	Permian	Abo Formation	United States (New Mexico)		A plant of uncertain affinities. The type species is Q. yamiae.	
Rhipidopsis laoyingshanensis	Sp. nov		Zhang et al.	Permian (Wuchiapingian)		China			
Samaropsis sulriograndensis	Sp. nov		Prado, Marques-de-Souza & Iannuzzi	Carboniferous–Permian (Gzhelian–Asselian)	Itararé Group	Brazil		A gymnosperm seed of uncertain affinities.	
Shanxioxylon yangquanense	Sp. nov		Wang & Wan in Wang et al.	Carboniferous (Kasimovian)	Benxi Formation	China		A cordaitalean.	
Sinolobotheca	Gen. et sp. nov	Valid	Wang et al.	Devonian (Famennian)	Wutong Formation	China		An ovule of a seed plant of uncertain affinities. Genus includes new species S. octa.	
Socorropteris	Gen. et sp. nov		DiMichele et al.	Permian	Abo Formation	United States (New Mexico)		A tracheophyte of uncertain affinities. Genus includes new species S. cancellarei.	
Sweetea	Gen. et sp. nov		Gastaldo	Carboniferous (Viséan)	Hartselle Sandstone	United States (Alabama)		A probable pteridosperm. Genus includes new species S. milowensis.	
Taenimacutis	Gen. et sp. nov	Valid	Foraponova	Permian		Russia (Udmurtia)		Dispersed cuticles with similarities to probable conifer cuticles from the Permian of Jordan assigned to the genus Cryptokerpia. Genus includes new species T. gomankovii.	
Willsiostrobus mogutchevii	Sp. nov		Karasev, Foraponova & Zavialova	Early Triassic	Bugarigkta Formation	Russia		A member of Voltziales belonging to the family Voltziaceae.	
Yuzhoua	Gen. et sp. nov		Wang, Lei & Fu	Permian (Asselian)	Lower Shihhotse Formation	China		A plant of uncertain affinities, with similarities to the flowering plants. The type species is Y. juvenilis.	
Zaijunia	Gen. et sp. nov		Li et al.	Devonian (Famennian)	Wutong Formation	China		A seed plant belonging to the group Lagenospermopsida and to the family Elkinsiaceae. The type species is Z. biloba.	

=== Other plant research ===
- Kocheva et al. (2025) study the composition of compressions of the Orestovia-like plants, and do not exclude the possibility that such fossils represent higher plants rather than algae.
- Kenrick & Long (2025) provide new information on the vascular system of Horneophyton lignieri, reporting evidence of presence of the conducting system with a solid core of thick-walled cells resembling transfer cells rather than tracheids.
- Krings (2025) identifies epidermal cells of Rhynia gwynne-vaughanii from the Devonian Rhynie chert (United Kingdom) with wall appositions encasing invasive fungal hyphae, representing the oldest record of such defense mechanism in plants reported to date.
- A study on the architecture and growth of Cladoxylon taeniatum from the Tournaisian Lydiennes Formation (France) is published by Durieux, Decombeix & Harper (2025).
- Huang & Zhang (2025) revise the holotype specimen of Zosterophyllum spathulatum from the Devonian Xujiachong Formation as a specimen of Adoketophyton subverticillatum, expanding known geographical range of the genus Adoketophyton.
- Doran & Tomescu (2025) identify emergences with possible rooting function in Psilophyton crenulatum from the Devonian Val d'Amour Formation (New Brunswick, Canada), potentially representing the oldest euphyllophyte rooting structures reported to date.
- A study on wood anatomy of Devonian euphyllophytes from the Battery Point Formation (Quebec, Canada) is published by Casselman & Tomescu (2025), who identify secondary xylem metrics that allow for distinguishing between different euphyllophyte taxa.
- The first description of the stomatal structure of Odontopteris schlotheimii is published by Šimůnek & Cleal (2025).
- Stem-like laterals interpreted as evidence of root suckering are reported in two specimens of Vertebraria from Permian strata from Skaar Ridge (Transantarctic Mountains, Antarctica) by Decombeix & Serbet (2025).
- Description of reproductive structures of members of Umkomasiaceae from the Triassic Cañadón Largo Formation (Argentina) is published by Villalva & Gnaedinger (2025), who determine the relationships between the studied structures and fronds.
- A study on the epidermal anatomy of Pterophyllum ptilum from the Upper Triassic Xujiahe Formation (China) is published by Lu et al. (2025).
- A study on the leaf anatomy of Ptilophyllum riparium from the Middle Jurassic strata in Central Russia is published by Bazhenova & Bazhenov (2025).
- Partial leaf representing the first record of a fossil Cycas from Australia is described from the Miocene Stuarts Creek site by Greenwood, Conran & West (2025).
- Pratt et al. (2025) describe fossil material of a member of the genus Dicranophyllum from the Desmoinesian strata of the Shelburn Formation (Indiana, United States), interpreted as evidence of alternating climatic regimes in the Illinois Basin during the middle Pennsylvanian.
- Zhang et al. (2025) revise the diversity of members of Ginkgoales from the Early and Middle Jurassic strata from the Dameigou and adjacent areas in the Qaidam Basin (China).

== Palynology ==
Name	Novelty	Status	Authors	Age	Unit	Location	Synonymized taxa	Notes	Images
Cadargasporites helbyi	Sp. nov		Peyrot et al.	Triassic	Babulu Formation	Timor-Leste			
Cadargasporites timorensis	Sp. nov		Peyrot et al.	Triassic	Babulu Formation	Timor-Leste			
Florschuetzia amazonica	Sp. nov		Hoorn et al.	Miocene		Brazil		Fossil pollen with affinity to Sonneratia.	
Planctonites? comasii	Sp. nov		Peyrot et al.	Triassic	Babulu Formation	Timor-Leste			
Sparganiaceaepollenites intertrappeansis	Nom. nov		DeBenedetti et al.	Late Cretaceous-Paleocene (Maastrichtian-Danian)	Mandla Formation	India	Sparganiaceaepollenites annulatus Thakre et al. 2024 (junior homonym of S. annulatus De Benedetti, 2023).	Fossil pollen; a replacement name for Sparganiaceaepollenites reticulatus Samant et al. (2022).	
Sparganiaceaepollenites oczkowicensis	Nom. nov		DeBenedetti et al.	Miocene		Poland		Fossil pollen; a replacement name for Sparganiaceaepollenites microreticulatus Grabowska & Ważyńska (2009).	
Stigmatocystia	Gen. et sp. nov		Strother et al.	Ordovician (Hirnantian)	Sarah Formation	Saudi Arabia		Zygospores of a member of the family Zygnemataceae. The type species is S. divericata.	
Sublagenicula echinata	Sp. nov		Asghar et al.	Permian (Asselian)	Taiyuan Formation	China		A sigillarian megaspore.	
Tenellisporites capillaris	Sp. nov		Zhan et al.	Triassic	Badong Formation	China		A lycopsid megaspore.	
Zygnema paleopawneanum	Sp. nov		Strother et al.	Ordovician (Hirnantian)	Sarah Formation	Saudi Arabia		Zygospores of a member of the genus Zygnema.	

=== Palynological research ===
- Evidence from the study of planktonic palynomorph assemblages from the Upper Paleozoic strata from the Paraná Basin (Brazil), indicative of impact of environmental conditions on the distribution of algal elements in palynological successions corresponding to the late Paleozoic icehouse, is presented by Bender et al. (2025).
- Wang, Sun & Shi (2025) study the composition of palynological assemblages from the Roadian Lucaogou and Hongyanchi formation, Capitanian Quanzijie Formation and Wuchiapingian Wutonggou Formation (China), and interpret changes in composition of the studied assemblages through time as consistent with extinction on the background level during the Capitanian mass extinction event.
- Nhamutole et al. (2025) study the composition of palynological assemblages from the Permian (Lopingian) strata of the Maniamba Basin (Mozambique), reporting evidence of the presence of plants indicative of lowland fluvial setting.
- Hotton et al. (2025) study the composition of the late Permian palynoflora from the Spearfish Formation (South Dakota, United States), providing evidence of similarities with the Lopingian palynofloras from Europe and evidence of spread of xerophytic flora across low-latitude Pangaea at that time.
- Evidence from the study of palynological assemblages from the South Chinese Meishan section, indicative of presence of persistent gymnosperm-dominated vegetation during the Permian-Triassic transition, is presented by Schneebeli-Hermann & Galasso (2025).
- Evidence from the study of palynofloral assemblages from the Germig Section (Qinghai-Tibetan Plateau; Tibet, China), interpreted as indicative of a shift from floras dominated by seed ferns and conifers to floras dominated by cheirolepids during the Triassic-Jurassic transition, is presented by Li et al. (2025).
- A study on palynofloral assemblages from the Lower Jurassic Rodiles Formation (Spain), providing evidence of presence of arid environment with Cheirolepidiaceae-dominated forests before the Toarcian Oceanic Anoxic Event, shift to a more humid environment and a fern-dominated flora during this event and return of drier conditions and Cheirolepidiaceae forests after the event, is published by Fernández-Rial et al. (2025).
- Description of the palynological assemblage from the Middle Jurassic Challacó Formation (Argentina), including a Mesozoic record of the otherwise Proterozoic to Paleozoic taxon Gloeocapsomorpha, is presented by Olivera et al. (2025).
- Zhang et al. (2025) study the composition of the Valanginian palynoflora from the Sao Khua Formation (Thailand), providing evidence of presence of a flora dominated by Cheirolepidiaceae growing in a humid subtropical climate with periodic arid seasons.
- Tricolpate pollen, identified as pollen of flowering plants belonging to the eudicot clade, is described from the Barremian strata from nearshore marine sediments in the Lusitanian Basin (Portugal) by Gravendyck et al. (2025).
- A study on the composition of the gymnosperm-dominated palynoflora from the Lower Cretaceous strata from the Koonwarra fossil bed (Australia) is published by Vajda et al. (2025).
- Evidence from the study of palynological assemblages from the Barremian–Aptian Gippsland Basin and the Albian Otway Basin (Victoria, Australia), indicative of a high-rainfall regime of a floral turnover in the studied resulting in different composition of the assemblages from the studied basins, is presented by Korasidis & Wagstaff (2025).
- Hofmann et al. (2025) describe twelve species of the pollen taxon Eucommiidtes from the Lower Cretaceous Rio da Batateira and Crato formations (Araripe Basin, Brazil), providing evidence of greater diversity and abundance of members of Erdtmanithecales in the plant assemblages known from the studied formations than indicated by known macrofossils.
- Araucariacean pollen assigned to five distinct morphological groups, providing evidence of diversity of gymnosperms in the Early Cretaceous vegetation, is described from the Rio da Batateira and Crato formations by Hofmann et al. (2025).
- A study on palynological samples from the lower member of the Aptian-Albian Río Tarde Formation (Argentina), providing evidence of presence of fern, gymnosperms and freshwater algae and evidence of warm and humid climate, is published by Matamala et al. (2025).
- Lin et al. (2025) reconstruct the vegetation and environmental conditions during the early evolution of the Songliao Basin on the basis of pollen and spores from core samples near the base of the Aptian Shahezi Formation (China).
- A new Albian palynoflora dominated by gymnospermous pollen is described from the Binggou Formation (Liaoning, China) by Tan et al. (2025).
- A study on palynofloral assemblages from the Las Loras UNESCO Global Geopark (Spain), providing evidence of gradual shift from conifer-dominated floras to ones with increased presence of flowering plants through the Albian–Cenomanian, is published by Rodríguez-Barreiro et al. (2025).
- Evidence from the study of palynomorph and palynofacies from the Bahariya Formation (Egypt), interpreted as indicative of warm and humid climate during the early-middle Cenomanian with a short episode of semi-arid to arid conditions during the late early Cenomanian, is presented by Abdelhalim et al. (2025).
- A study on the composition of the gymnosperm-dominated Campanian palynological assemblages from the La Anita and Cerro Fortaleza formations (Argentina) is published by Santamarina et al. (2025).
- Evidence from the study of palynoflora from Deccan Intertrappean Beds in the southeastern part of the Deccan Volcanic Province (India), interpreted as indicating that the onset of Deccan volcanism was favourable for the proliferation of ecosystems dominated by flowering plants, is presented by Samant et al. (2025).
- Vieira & Jolley (2025) describe Classopollis pollen (produced by members of the family Cheirolepidiaceae) from the Paleocene sedimentary rocks of the Antrim Lava Group (Northern Ireland, United Kingdom), and interpret the studied pollen as reworked from Cretaceous strata.
- Evidence from the study of palynological assemblages from the Llanos basin (Colombia), indicative of impact of environmental changes on the diversification of Neotropical plants during the Cenozoic, is presented by de la Parra & Benson (2025).
- Rull (2025) revises purported fossil pollen records of Pelliciera found outside the Neotropics, and argues that only a subset of Cenozoic pollen records from tropical West Africa can be confirmed as likely fossils of members of Pelliciera.
- Evidence from the study of the fossil record of pollen from the Bighorn Basin (Wyoming, United States) and from pollination mode of extant plants related to the fossil taxa, interpreted as indicating that animal pollination became more common during the Paleocene–Eocene Thermal Maximum, is presented by Korasidis et al. (2025).
- A study on the fossil pollen from the Sonari Lignite Mine (Rajasthan, India), providing evidence of changes of composition of the plant assemblage from the studied area during the Paleocene-Eocene transition, is published by Parmar, Singh & Prasad (2025).
- Revision of the fossil pollen of members of Fabales, Rosales, Fagales, Malpighiales, Myrtales, Sapindales, Malvales, Santalales and Caryophyllales from the palynological assemblage from the Eocene Messel Formation (Germany) is published by Bouchal et al. (2025).
- Evidence from the study of fossil pollen from the Dingqinghu Formation (China), indicative of presence of a mixed deciduous and coniferous forest in the central Qinghai-Tibet Plateau during the Oligocene-Miocene transition, is presented by Xie et al. (2025).
- Malaikanok et al. (2025) study the fossil pollen of members of Ericales from the Oligocene-Miocene strata from the Ban Pa Kha Subbasin of the Li Basin (Thailand), identifying 24 different pollen types, and interpret the studied pollen as possible fossil record of different vertical vegetation belts in the mountainous areas.
- Macphail, Westermann & Hill (2025) study the composition of the plant assemblage from the Miocene strata from the Bulga Plateau (New South Wales, Australia) as indicated by the fossil record of pollen and spores, finding no evidence of a significant floristic interchange with Southeast Asia during the early stages of the Middle Miocene Climatic Optimum in the studied area.
- A study on the morphology and diversity of pollen grains of cacti from the Miocene strata of the Tehuacán Formation in the Tehuacán-Cuicatlán Valley (Mexico) is published by Ramírez-Arriaga et al. (2025).
- A new palynological assemblage, providing evidence of presence of forest swamp vegetation, is described from the Pliocene strata from Moormerland (Lower Saxony, Germany) by Stojakowits, Rösch & Röhm (2025).
- Evidence from the study of pollen record from the Zoige Basin, indicative of changes of vegetation in the Tibetan Plateau related to temperature changes during the last 3.5 million years, is presented by Zhao et al. (2025).
- A study on pollen of modern plants from the eastern Tibetan Plateau, providing evidence that pollen assemblages can provide basis for reconstructions of past vegetation and climate, is published by Cao et al. (2025).
- A study on the environment and climate in Java (Indonesia) during the early Pleistocene, based on data from palynological assemblages from the Kalibiuk and Kaliglagah formations, is published by Morley & Morley (2025), who interpret the studied assemblages as indicative of a strongly seasonal climate, and interpret the assemblages from the Kalibuik Formation and the basal Kaliglagah Formation as indicative of presence of a large delta dominated by mangroves, while considering the assemblages from the upper Kaliglagah Formation to be consistent with the presence of a freshwater swamp.
- Evidence from the study of pollen record from the eastern Mainland Southeast Asia, indicative of presence of forest-seasonal savanna mosaics in the studied region during the Last Glacial Maximum, is presented by Lin et al. (2025), who find no evidence of presence of savanna corridors linking the Leizhou Peninsula and Singapore during the Last Glacial Maximum.
- Rull (2025) argues for caution in the use of the fossil pollen record and comparisons with modern analogues of fossil pollen taxa for reconstructions of past environments, as such reconstructions are based on the assumption of niche conservatism which might be unwarranted.

== General research ==
- Review of the structure of 38 fossil forests ranging from the Middle Devonian Epoch to the Jurassic is published by Liu, Xu & Wang (2025).
- A study on changes of diversity of late Paleozoic plants, providing evidence of major vegetation changes in the Mississippian-Guadalupian interval, is published by Molina-Solís et al. (2025).
- Evidence of similarities of preservation of Permian plant leaves from the Vale Formation (Texas, United States) and Ediacaran vendobionts from Flinders Ranges (Australia) is presented by Retallack (2025).
- A study on the composition of the Early Permian plant assemblage from the coal-bearing sequence of Kurasia Colliery (Chirimiri Coalfield, Son Basin, India) is published by Saxena et al. (2025).
- A study on the floral assemblage from the Permian strata of the East Bokaro Coalfield (India), providing evidence of the presence of a diverse ecosystem of large trees and shrubs, is published by Dash et al. (2025).
- Dash et al. (2025) revise known record of traces of insect herbivory on fossil leaves from the Permian strata of the East Bokaro Coalfield.
- Kock & Bamford (2025) study growth rings in fossil woods from the Permian Beaufort Group (South Africa), and interpret their findings as indicative of a stable climate with no significant differences between the middle and late Permian.
- Ferraz et al. (2025) report the discovery of a diverse plant association in the Guadalupian strata from the Cerro Chato outcrop (Paraná Basin, Brazil).
- Evidence of changes of composition of gigantopterid-dominated rainforests known from the Longtan Formation (China) during the Lopingian is presented by Shu et al. (2025), who also report evidence of the presence of climbing structures in Gigantonoclea.
- Evidence from the study of fossil material from the South Taodonggou Section in the Turpan-Hami Basin (China), interpreted as indicative of presence of a refugium of land vegetation that preserved the stability of food chains during the Permian–Triassic extinction event and might have been one of the source regions for the diversification of terrestrial life in the aftermath of the extinction event, is presented by Peng et al. (2025).
- Evidence of a staggered recovery of plant communities from the Sydney Basin (Australia) in the aftermath of the Permian–Triassic extinction event, indicative of the presence of a succession gymnosperm-dominated and lycophyte-dominated plant communities lasting until the early Middle Triassic, is presented by Amores et al. (2025).
- Xu et al. (2025) link prolonged high CO_{2} levels and extreme hothouse climate during the Early Triassic to losses of terrestrial vegetation during the Permian–Triassic extinction event.
- McLoughlin, Vajda & Crowley (2025) determine the flora from the upper part of the Red Cliff Coal Measures (New South Wales, Australia) to be late Norian in age, and interpret the entirety of Ipswich Coal Measures as likely to be Norian.
- A study on the composition of plant assemblages from the Astartekløft and South Tancrediakløft localities (Jameson Land, Greenland), providing evidence of a floristic turnover during the Triassic-Jurassic transition, is published by Knetge et al. (2025).
- Quiroz-Cabascango et al. (2025) report the discovery of a new plant assemblage dominated by ginkgoopsids, cheirolepid conifers and ferns from the Hettangian Helsingborg Member of the Höganäs Formation (Sweden), providing evidence of recovery of vegetation in the aftermath of the Triassic–Jurassic extinction event.
- Evidence from the study of molecular fossils from the Sangonghe Formation (China), indicative of a shift from a fern-dominated flora to a gymnosperm-dominated one during the Toarcian Oceanic Anoxic Event and eventual return to fern dominance, is presented by Wang et al. (2025).
- A study on the composition of the Middle Jurassic plant assemblage from the Khamarkhoovor Formation (Mongolia) is published by Muraviev et al. (2025).
- Chen et al. (2025) identify seven types of gymnosperm (including bennettitalean and conifer) cuticles from the Middle Jurassic (Bathonian) flora from the Arda Formation (Jordan), and report evidence of similarities of the studied flora to other Jurassic floras from the Middle East.
- Evidence of the presence of a plant community dominated by ferns belonging to the family Osmundaceae, similar to extant plant communities such as those from swamp settings from the Parana Forest in northeastern Argentina, is reported from the Jurassic La Matilde Formation (Argentina) by García Massini et al. (2025).
- Huang & Zhang (2025) study the composition of the plant assemblage from the Lower Cretaceous Yingzuilazi Formation (Jilin, China), and identify four Early Cretaceous plant communities in the Baishan Basin.
- Bueno-Cebollada, Kvaček & Barrón (2025) study the composition of the late Albian conifer-dominated floras from the Cuenca and Maestrazgo basin (Spain), and report evidence supporting araucariacean affinities of the Albian amber from the Maestrazgo Basin.
- A diverse assemblage of opalized plant fossils is described from the Cretaceous (Albian–Cenomanian) Griman Creek Formation (Australia) by McLoughlin et al. (2025).
- Coiffard et al. (2025) revise the Cenomanian flora from the Bahariya Formation (Egypt) on the basis of the study of known and new fossil leaves, and identify three distinct floral associations.
- Silva et al. (2025) study the taphonomy of exceptionally preserved plant remains from the Upper Cretaceous Santa Marta Formation (Antarctica).
- Stiles et al. (2025) reconstruct the evolutionary history of vegetation in Argentine Patagonia during the Cenozoic on the basis of phytoliths from the San Jorge Basin, reporting evidence of presence of lowland humid megathermal forests from Paleocene to the middle Eocene, colder, more arid climate and more open vegetation beginning between the middle and late Eocene, return of humid forests and increased abundance of grasses between the early and middle Miocene, and rise of Patagonian steppe vegetation between the middle Miocene and the Quaternary.
- Rogger et al. (2025) determine the response of vegetation to Paleocene–Eocene Thermal Maximum on the basis of study of the fossil record and vegetation model simulations, reporting evidence indicative of reduction of resilience of vegetation to stress, a widespread loss of productivity and disruption of vegetation-mediated climate regulation mechanisms.
- Evidence from the study of phytoliths from the Lunpola Basin of the Qinghai–Tibetan Plateau, interpreted as indicative of presence mixed coniferous and broad-leaved forest during the late Oligocene–Early Miocene, is presented by Zhang et al. (2025).
- A study on the timing of the uplift of the Lhasa and Qiangtang terranes, based on composition of fossil plant communities from the Qinghai–Tibet Plateau (China), is published by Lai et al. (2025).
- Evidence indicating that climate and geographic changes in the Miocene resulted in vegetation changes that in turn caused climate change feedbacks that impacted cooling and precipitation changes during the late Miocene climate transition is presented by Zhang et al. (2025).
- Evidence from the study of plant macrofossils and palynoflora from the Pisco Formation (Peru), indicative of presence of a diverse dry forest biome in the area of present-day coastal Peruvian desert during the Miocene, is presented by Ochoa et al. (2025).
- A study on ancient DNA from sediment cores from lakes in Alaska and Siberia, providing evidence of plant extinctions associated with environmental changes during the Pleistocene–Holocene transition, is published by Courtin et al. (2025).
- Evidence of changes of the upper range limit of trees in the Tibetan Plateau since the Last Glacial Maximum, and of a relationship between those changes and pattern of beta diversity of the studied flora, is presented Xu et al. (2025).
- El-Saadawi et al. (2025) present an annotated catalog of plant macrofossil remains from Egypt, including fossils ranging from Devonian to Quaternary.
- Jardine, Morck & Lomax (2025) compare the utility of morphological traits which might be proxies for genome size of fossil plants, and report evidence of a robust relationship between genome size and guard cell length in plants.
- Liu et al. (2025) review the development and application of artificial intelligence in paleobotany and palynology from the 1980s to 2025.
- Carrión et al. (2025) review the development of the botanical paleoart throughout its history.
