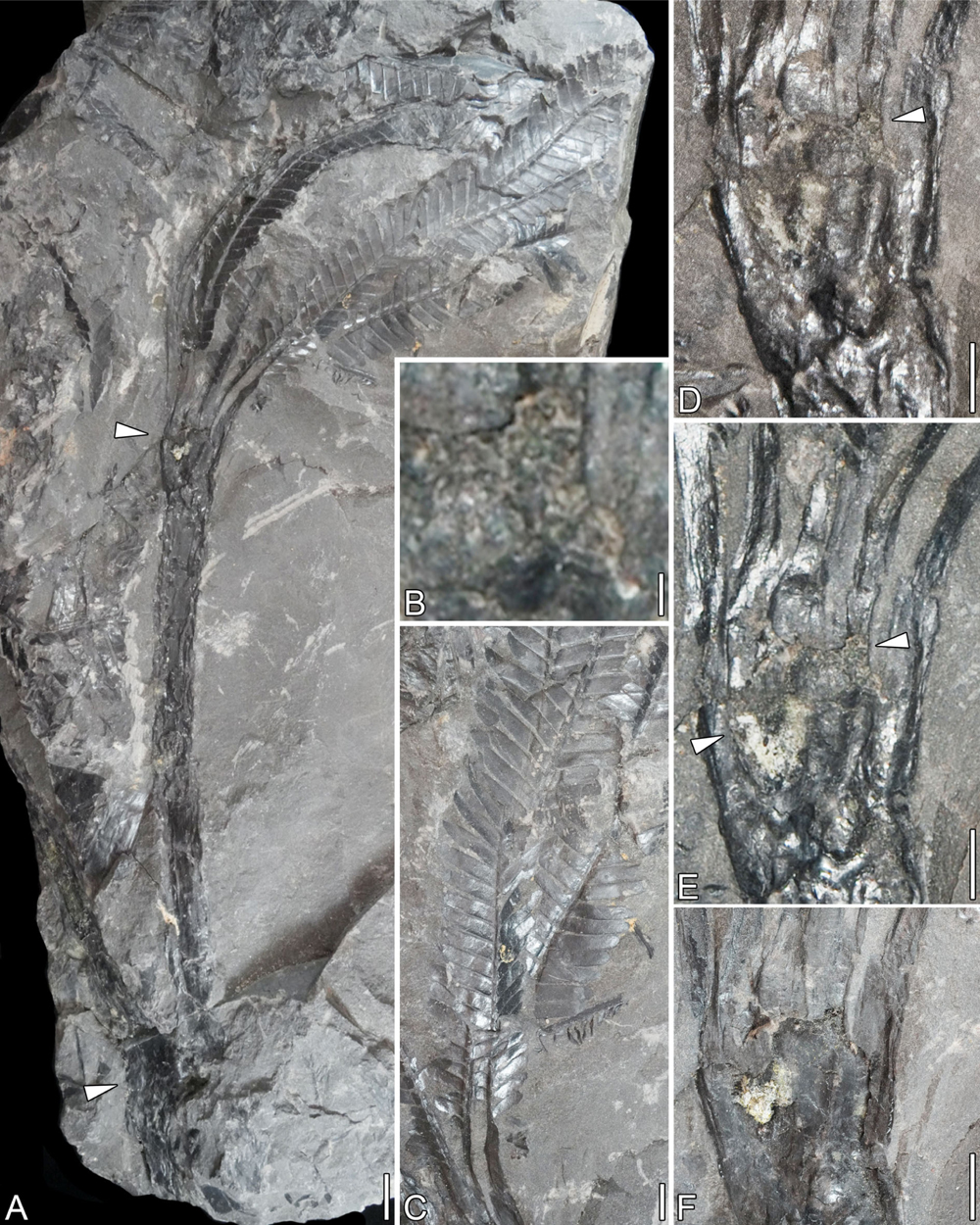
- MM-000940 (holotype)

Scientific classification
- Kingdom: Plantae
- Clade: Embryophytes
- Clade: Tracheophytes
- Order: †Bennettitales
- Family: †Williamsoniaceae
- Genus: †Ohaniella; C.Pott and H.Takimoto, 2025
- Species: †O. ptilofolia

Binomial name
- †Ohaniella ptilofolia C.Pott and H.Takimoto, 2025

= Ohaniella =

Ohaniella Temporal range: 161.2–155.7 Ma Late Jurassic (Oxfordian)

Fossil plant genus

Ohaniella (IPA: [ɔː.hɑ.ni.ɛl.la]) (named after Tamiko Ohana Japanese: 大花 民子) is a monotypic whole-plant genus of williamsoniacean bennettitalean from the Tochikubo Formation of Fukushima, northeast Japan. The type species is Ohaniella ptilofolia, known from various whole-plant specimens comprising leaf-bearing branches and disarticulated leaves of the Ptilophyllum jurassicum-type, a mature or maturing seed cone of the Bennetticarpus-type, and potential male reproductive organs of the Weltrichia-type.

== Etymology ==
The generic name (Ohaniella IPA: [ɔː.hɑ.ni.ɛl.la]) is after Tamiko Ohana (IPA: [tamiko ɔːhɑnɑ]) (Japanese: 大花 民子 IPA: [ɔː.hɑ.nɑ ta.mi.ko]) using the Latin suffix -ella (a commonly used suffix in binomial nomenclature named after a person) "in honour of her excellent contributions to Japanese palaeobotany". The specific name (ptilofolia (IPA: [ptí.lo.ˈfɔː.li.a]) is from the Ancient Greek word πτίλον (ptĭ́lon (IPA: [ptí.lon])) (which translates to feather) and the Latin folium (IPA: [ˈfɔː.li.um])) (which translates to leaf) in reference to the Ptilophyllum jurassicum-type foliage of the plant.

== Description ==
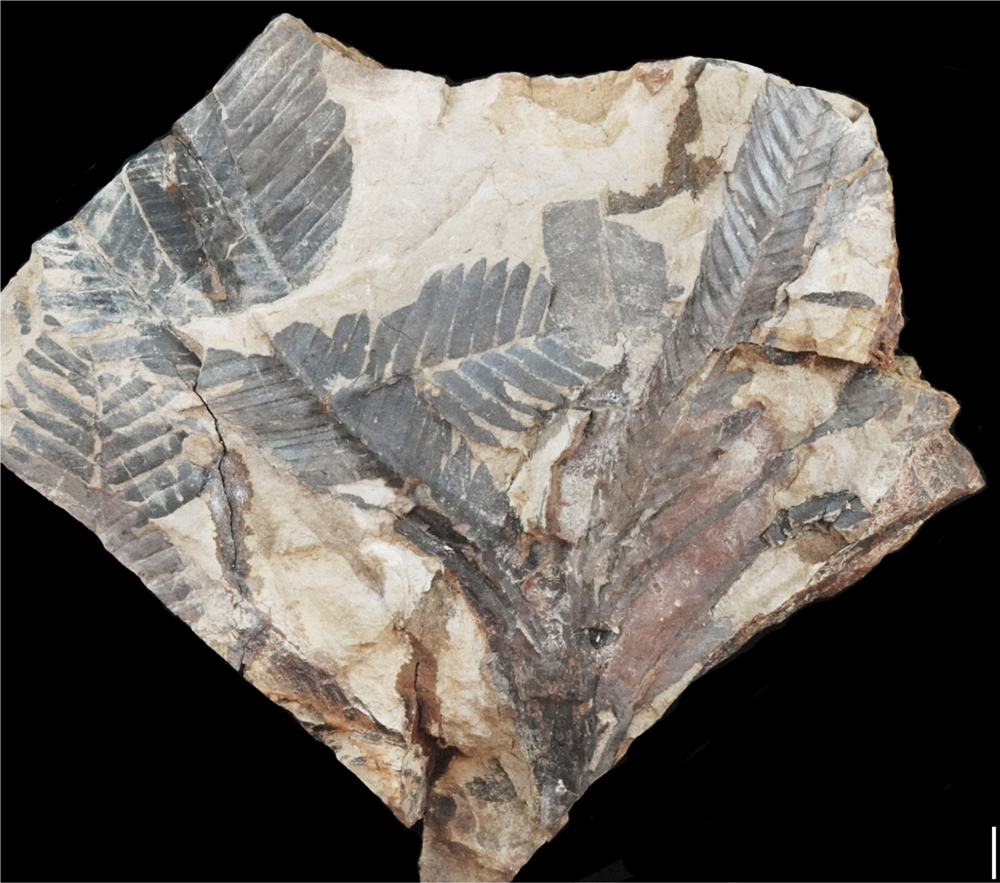
MM-000941, the epitype of Ohaniella ptilofolio

Pott and Takimoto (2025) investigated six specimens, two of which they designated the holotype (MM-000940) and epitype (MM-000941). Both specimens consist of a branched axis with attached leaves. The holotype preserves a Bennetticarpus-type mature or maturing seed cone at the terminal end of the axis, while MM-000951 and MM-000949 preserve possible microsporangiate organs (pollen cones) of the Weltrichia-type besides the associated Ptilophyllum jurassicum-type foliage. This led the authors to refrain from making a confirmed referral but still mention the possibility that these could be the microsporangiate organs of the plant.

=== 'Penultimate pinnae' ?Nipponoptilophyllum bipinnatum ===
In their description of Ohaniella, Pott and Takimoto also examined more than 50 additional specimens of disarticulated leaves. In the process, they re-examined the original material of Nipponoptilophyllum bipinnatum and found that not only was the assumed bipinnate nature of the leaves not conclusive based on the available material, but also that 49 specimens of detached leaves (referred to as 'penultimate pinnae' in a previous paper) may be conspecific with P. jurassicum if the bipinnate nature of the leaves is not reflective of the actual anatomy.

=== Ptilophyllum oshikaense ===
In the examination of disarticulated leaves, the authors concluded that the differences between P. oshikaense and P. jurassicum are "so marginal that they better range within the limits of intraspecific variation than discriminate between leaf taxa", making "P. oshikaense" a junior synonym of P. jurassicum.

== Palaeobiology ==
Ohaniella preserves similar growth structures to other bennettitaleans, including divaricately branched growth with the reproductive organs growing on the terminal end of the main axis, later inducing lateral branching during the next growth period (the period probably being seasonally or annually). Pott and Takimoto further interpreted Ohaniella as having a similar overall architecture to the whole-plant williamsoniacean Kimuriella, specifically a "low-growing shrub-like [plant] probably up to 1–2 m tall... [with] divaricately branched axes [that] probably formed tangled shrub thickets with interlaced axes". They noted that the two plants still warrant different genera as "the foliage of the two plants [is] placed in two different but sound genera" with Kimuriella possessing Zamites-type foliage and Ohaniella possessing Ptilophyllum-type foliage respectively.

== Palaeoecology ==
The Tochikubo Formation, from which Ohaniella is known, has been interpreted as a mostly non-marine fluvial to near-shore and low-energy lake deposit, with the facies of the formation changing in ascending order from fluvial to lake association, flood plain, alluvial fan into a delta-front coastal environment in its uppermost part.

The authors that described the plant state that "it is reasonable to assume that O. ptilofolia...also extended its habitat into brackish to tidal mudflat areas or tidelands similar to those found in modern mangroves or saltmarshes," growing in "brackish to tidal mudflat areas or delta settings that were regularly flooded such as in mangroves or tideland habitats."
