= Swintonia pierrei =

Scientific classification
- Kingdom: Plantae
- Clade: Tracheophytes
- Clade: Angiosperms
- Clade: Eudicots
- Clade: Rosids
- Order: Sapindales
- Family: Anacardiaceae
- Subfamily: Anacardioideae
- Genus: Swintonia
- Species: S. pierrei

Binomial name
- Swintonia pierrei Hance

Species of tree

Swintonia pierrei is a tree species in the family Anacardiaceae. It is native to Cambodia and Vietnam.

== Description ==
H.F. Hance's original description (in Latin) reads approximately: "SWINTONIA PIERREI, sp. nov. — Branches with angular lines raised from the base of the petioles running down with smooth stripes, attached to petioles 1-2 inches [25-51 mm] long are leathery leaves which are oblong to oblong-ovate, with a margin cartilaginous base obtusely wedged apex bluntly emarginated 4½ - 6 inches [114-152 mm] by 1½ - 2 inches; broad, pale green, bright, under dark grey, a strong rib under about prominent sub-veins off the primary veins on both sides, at an angle of 60° from the costa, the venular net on both sides but particularly visible from below.

The semi-woody drupes have a subreniform-ovoid base with two humps at the top and three lateral stigmatic scars marked 1¼ inches [32 mm] along the long base of the calyx, with small petals and rigid leathery oblong obtuse "nervosis" with 3 long lin. The cotyledons filling the seed pod recline from plano-convex radicles."
