= Swintonia spicifera =

Conservation status
- Near Threatened (IUCN 3.1)

Scientific classification
- Kingdom: Plantae
- Clade: Tracheophytes
- Clade: Angiosperms
- Clade: Eudicots
- Clade: Rosids
- Order: Sapindales
- Family: Anacardiaceae
- Genus: Swintonia
- Species: S. spicifera

Binomial name
- Swintonia spicifera Hook.f.

Species of tree

Swintonia spicifera is a species of plant in the family Anacardiaceae. It is found in Indonesia, Malaysia, and the Philippines. Swintonia spicifera grows as a tree on hill and mountain ridges.
