= Swintonia robinsonii =

Conservation status
- Least Concern (IUCN 2.3)

Scientific classification
- Kingdom: Plantae
- Clade: Tracheophytes
- Clade: Angiosperms
- Clade: Eudicots
- Clade: Rosids
- Order: Sapindales
- Family: Anacardiaceae
- Genus: Swintonia
- Species: S. robinsonii

Binomial name
- Swintonia robinsonii Ridley

Species of tree

Swintonia robinsonii is a species of plant in the family Anacardiaceae. It is a tree endemic to Peninsular Malaysia.
