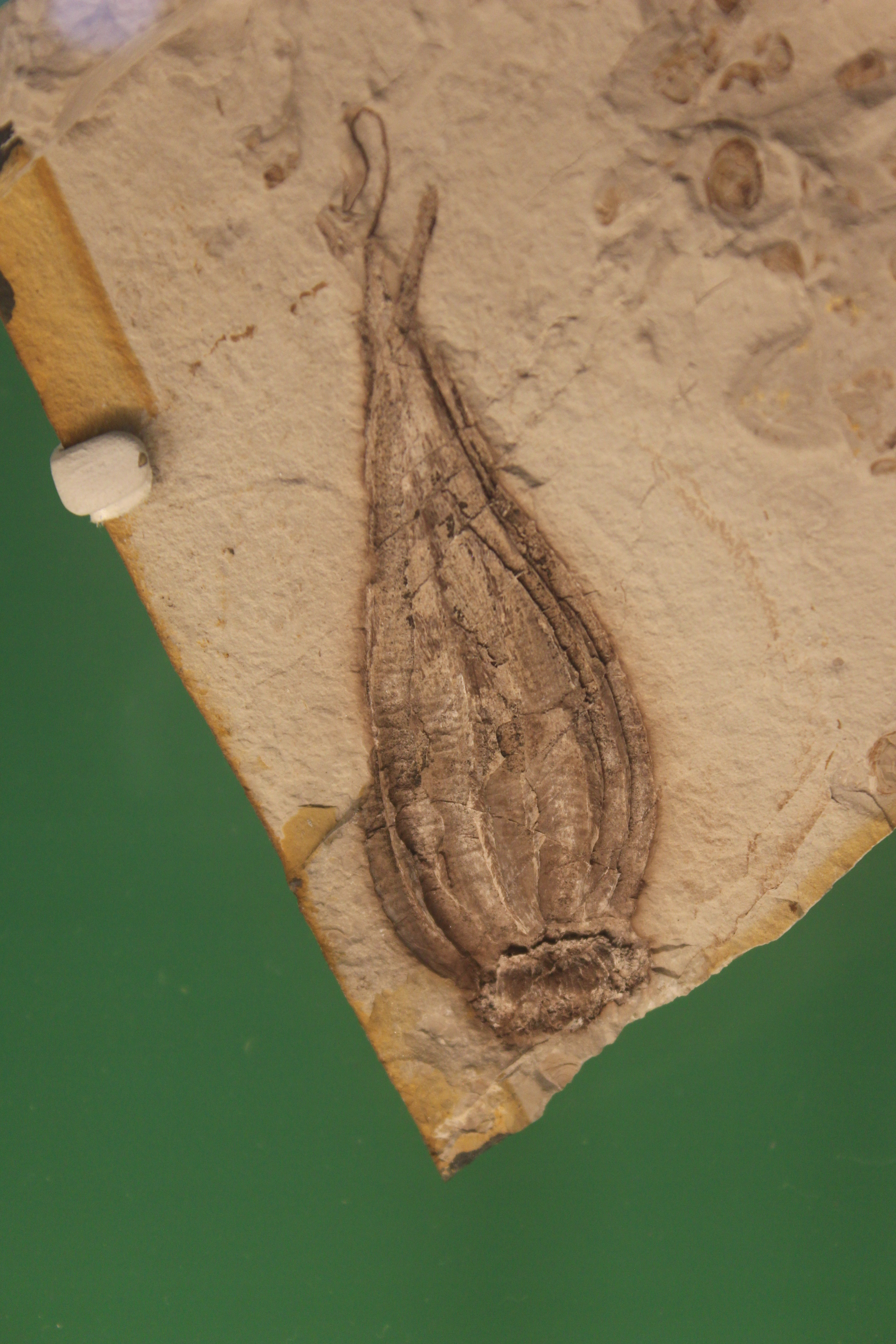
- Williamsonia fossil (CNU 39), National Museum of Natural History

Scientific classification
- Kingdom: Plantae
- Clade: Embryophytes
- Clade: Tracheophytes
- Clade: Spermatophytes
- Order: †Bennettitales
- Family: †Williamsoniaceae
- Genus: †Williamsonia; Carruth., 1870

Type species
- Williamsonia gigas Carruth., 1870

= Williamsonia (plant) =

Williamsonia Temporal range: Early Triassic–Late Cretaceous

Extinct genus of plant

Williamsonia is a genus of plant belonging to Bennettitales, an extinct order of seed plants. Within the form classification system used in paleobotany, Williamsonia is used to refer to female seed cones, which are associated with plants that also bore the male flower-like reproductive structure Weltrichia.

== Description ==
Cross section of Williamsonia harrisiana (India, Jurassic - Early Cretaceous)

The monosporangiate female Williamsonia seed cone (sometimes described as a "flower" though this does not imply homology with angiosperm flowers) consists of an ovulate receptacle enclosed by bracts (modified leaves), with the receptacle bearing sporophylls with terminal seeds/ovules, which are surrounded by interseminal scales. The micropyle of the ovules varied from protruding above the cone to slightly sunken in, depending on the species. The cones were of variable shape, with reported morphologies including pyriform (pear shaped), ovoid, subspheroidal, and oblate spheroid and could be up to 15 centimetres (5.9 in) in diameter. As many as 25–50 ovules could be present in each cone. The cone was borne on a peduncle, and grew at the apex of a branch. In at least some species, only one Williamsonia cone grew per active branch at any one time/season, while the cones from the preceding season/time developed into mature seed cones. The cones have been suggested to be wind pollinated. In at least some species, the cones increased in size during maturation, which might reflect the transformation of the interseminal scales into a fleshy coating possibly used to attract seed dispersers.

=== Associated plant parts ===
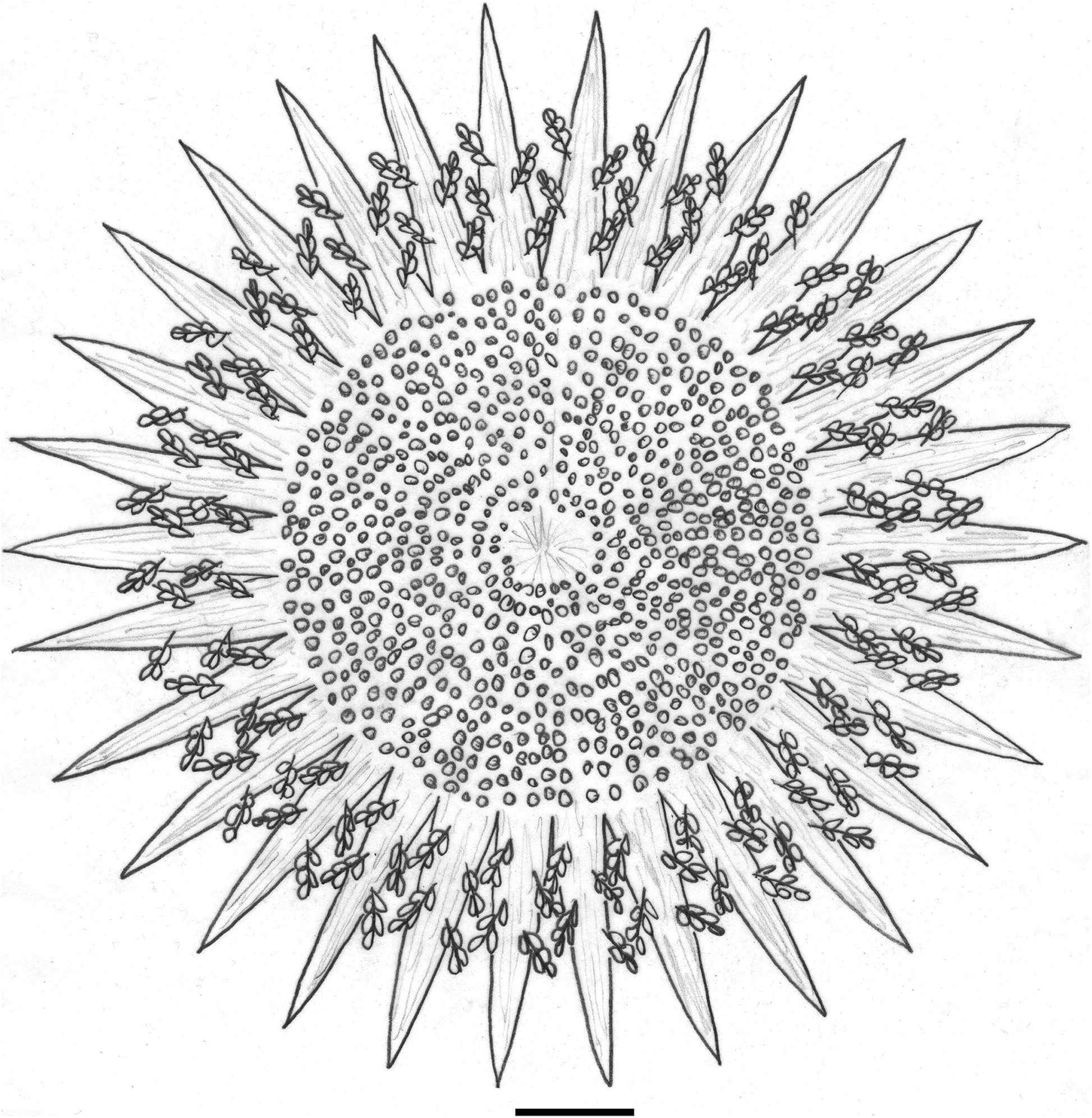
Weltrichia sol, the male reproductive organ counterpart to the type species of Williamsonia, W. gigas scale bar = 20mm/~0.8 in

Williamsonia is typically associated with the male flower-like reproductive structure Weltrichia. It is unclear whether the parent plants were monoecious (having both structures on one plant) or dioecious (where each plant only has one gender of reproductive organ). In Kimuriella densifolia from the Late Jurassic of Japan and Williamsonia gigas from the Middle Jurassic of England, the Williamsonia cone is associates with leaves assignable to the genus Zamites, while Williamsonia carolinensis from the Late Triassic of North America is associated with leaves assigned to Eoginkgoites. Kimuriella is thought to have been a divaricately branching, low growing shrub with a maximum height of 2–3 metres, with a growth form similar to that of Wielandiella, while Williamsonia gigas may have been more cycad-like. In Kimuriella and W. gigas, the axes (assigned to Bucklandia in W. gigas), which were up to 16 millimetres (0.63 in) and 40–50 millimetres (1.6–2.0 in) wide respectively, were densely covered with persistent leaf bases, which were apparently sloughed off in older branches. The affinity of the cycad-like Williamsonia sewardiana from Early Cretaceous Rajmahal Hills of India to the family Williamsoniaceae has been questioned, with some scholars suggesting that the species may represent an early species of Cycadeoidaceae instead.

== Taxonomy ==
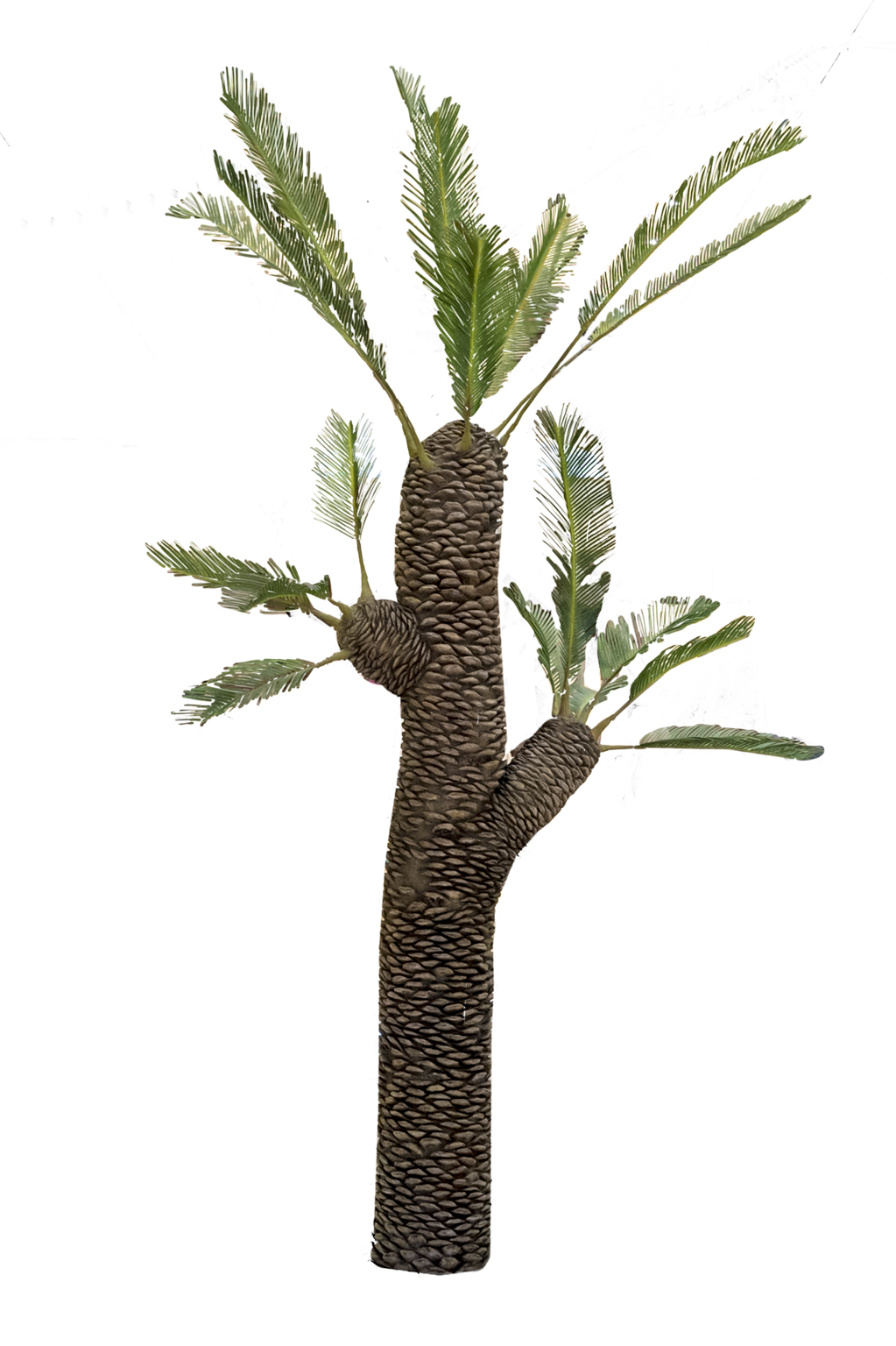
Williamsonia sewardiana life restoration by MUSE - Science Museum, whose affinity to Williamsoniaceae has been questioned

Williamsonia was originally described as Zamia gigas by William Crawford Williamson. William Carruthers proposed the name Williamsonia in 1870, with the type species being W. gigas from the Middle Jurassic of England. When originally specifying the genus, Carruthers specifically referred to the foliage, which modern authors usually assign to the foliage genus Zamites. However, later authors beginning with Tom Harris's 1969 publication The Yorkshire Jurassic Flora used Williamsonia to refer to the ovulate reproductive organs.

== Distribution ==
Fossils of Williamsonia are known spanning from the Early and Middle Triassic to Late Cretaceous, and have been found worldwide, including in Europe, Australia, North America, East Asia India and South America.
