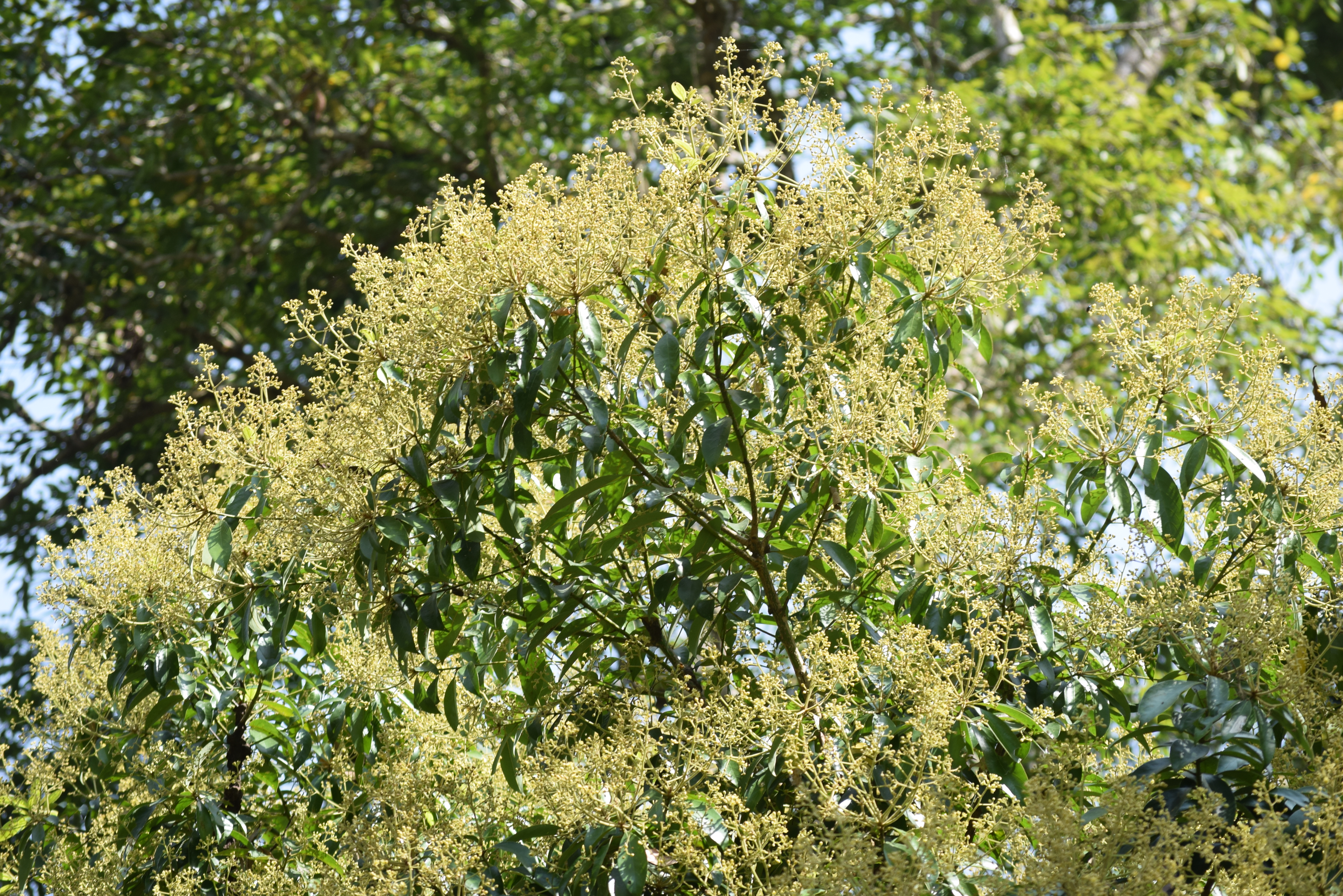
- Flowering Swintonia floribunda

Scientific classification
- Kingdom: Plantae
- Clade: Tracheophytes
- Clade: Angiosperms
- Clade: Eudicots
- Clade: Rosids
- Order: Sapindales
- Family: Anacardiaceae
- Genus: Swintonia
- Species: S. floribunda

Binomial name
- Swintonia floribunda Griff., 1846

Synonyms
- Swintonia puberula H. H. W. Pearson; Swintonia griffithii Kurz

= Swintonia floribunda =

Species of tree

Swintonia floribunda is a tree species in the family Anacardiaceae and the type species in the genus. It can be found in the Andaman Islands, Bangladesh, Indo-China and Malesia through to Sumatra.

Plants of the World Online lists a subspecies, S. floribunda var. penangiana (King) K.M. Kochummen, which is found in peninsular Malaysia.
