= Hexagonokaryon =

Hexagonokaryon Temporal range: Paleocene

Scientific classification
- Kingdom: Plantae
- Clade: Tracheophytes
- Clade: Angiosperms
- Clade: Eudicots
- Clade: Rosids
- Order: Fagales
- Family: Fagaceae
- Genus: †Hexagonokaryon; Manchester et al., 2026
- Species: †H. nixonii

Binomial name
- †Hexagonokaryon nixonii Manchester et al., 2026

Extinct genus of Fagaceae

Hexagonokaryon is an extinct flowering plant belonging to the family Fagaceae, from the Paleocene of the United States. Hexagonokaryon is the first Fagaceae plant with preserved fruits, in the form of nuts, furthering the knowledge of the early evolution of oak trees.

== Discovery and naming ==
The fossil material for Hexagonokaryon was found in the Fort Union Formation, Wyoming, United States during 1992, 1993 and 2008. The material formally described and named in 2026.

The generic name Hexagonokaryon derives from the Greek words "Hexagon", to mean "six-sided"; and "Karyon", to mean "nut". The specific name nixonii is in honour of Kevin C. Nixon, who has made major contributions to the Fagaceae through many phylogeny, systematics and paleobotany studies.

== Description ==
Hexagonokaryon nixonii consists of an elongate raceme-like inflorescence, which itself is further composed of terminal ovoid cupule up to 5.4–6.9 mm (0.2–0.3 in) in height, and 5.6–16.3 mm (0.2–0.6 in) in width, alongside long peduncled cupules, which are around 7–10 mm (0.3–0.4 in) in length, and 1.2–1.5 mm (0.0–0.1 in) in width.

The cupule are four-valved, containing up to three nuts. The nuts themselves consist of two lateral nuts and one central nut, which get up to 4.6–5.8 mm (0.2–0.2 in) in height, and 3.3–3.5 mm (0.1–0.1 in) in width. They are basally attached to the cupule, with two whorls of three tepals, which can get up to 1.3–1.6 mm (0.1–0.1 in) in length, and 0.18–0.31 mm (0.01–0.01 in) in width. The lower tepal whorl arises from intermediate ridges, whilst the upper whorls arise from the major ridges.
