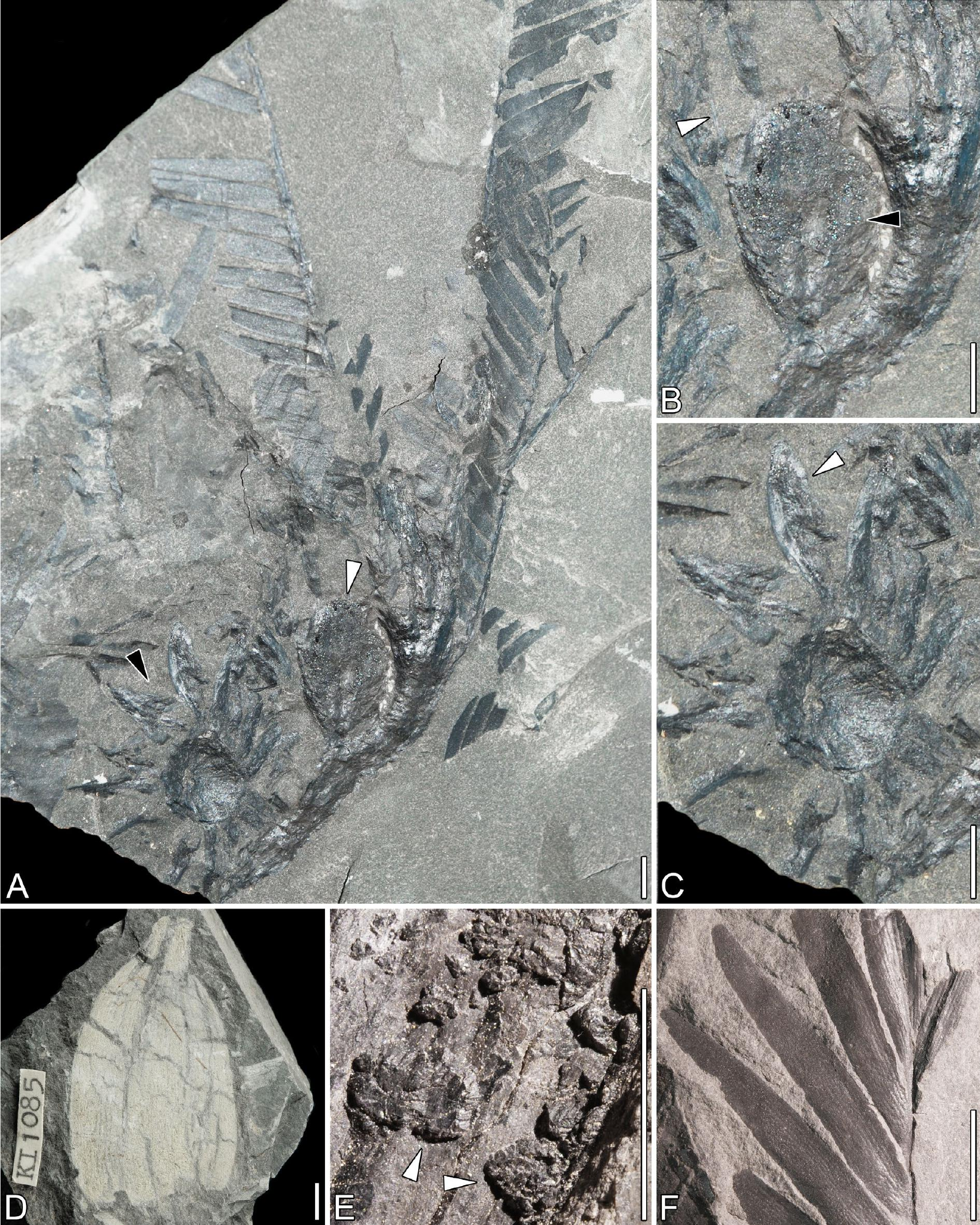
- Holotype (MM-00923a) and epitype (MM-00923b)

Scientific classification
- Kingdom: Plantae
- Clade: Embryophytes
- Clade: Tracheophytes
- Order: †Bennettitales
- Family: †Williamsoniaceae
- Genus: †Kimuriella; C.Pott et Takimoto, 2022
- Species: †K. densifolia

Binomial name
- †Kimuriella densifolia C.Pott et Takimoto, 2022

= Kimuriella =

Kimuriella Temporal range: 161.2–155.7 Ma (see article for discussion) Late Jurassic (Oxfordian)

Fossil plant genus

Kimuriella (IPA: [ki.mɯ.ɾi.ɛl.la]) (named after Tatsuaki Kimura Japanese: 木村 達明) is a monotypic whole-plant genus of williamsoniacean bennettitalean from the Tochikubo Formation of Fukushima, northeast Japan. The type species is Kimuriella densifolia, known from various specimens comprising leaf-bearing branches and disarticulated leaves of the Zamites nipponicus-type, articulated and disarticulated mature and maturing seed cone of the Williamsonia-type, and articulated and disarticulated male reproductive organs of the Weltrichia-type.

== Etymology ==
The generic name (Kimuriella IPA: [ki.mɯ.ɾi.ɛl.la]) is after Tatsuaki Kimura (IPA: [ta.tsɯ.a.ki ki.mɯ.ɾa]) (Japanese: 木村 達明 IPA: [ki.mɯ.ɾa ta.tsɯ.a.ki]) using the diminutive Latin suffix -ella (a commonly used suffix in binomial nomenclature named after a person) "in honour of his excellent contributions to Japanese palaeobotany". The specific name (densifolia IPA: [dɛn.si.fɔː.li.a]) is from the Latin word densus (Latin: dēnsus IPA: [ˈdẽː.sʊs]) (specifically the plural form, densi (Latin: dēnsī IPA: [ˈdẽː.siː])), (which translates to dense) and the Latin folium (IPA: [ˈfɔ.li.ũː]) (specifically the plural form, folia (IPA: [ˈfɔ.li.a])) (which translates to leaf) in reference to the dense and stiff foliage of the plant.

== Description ==
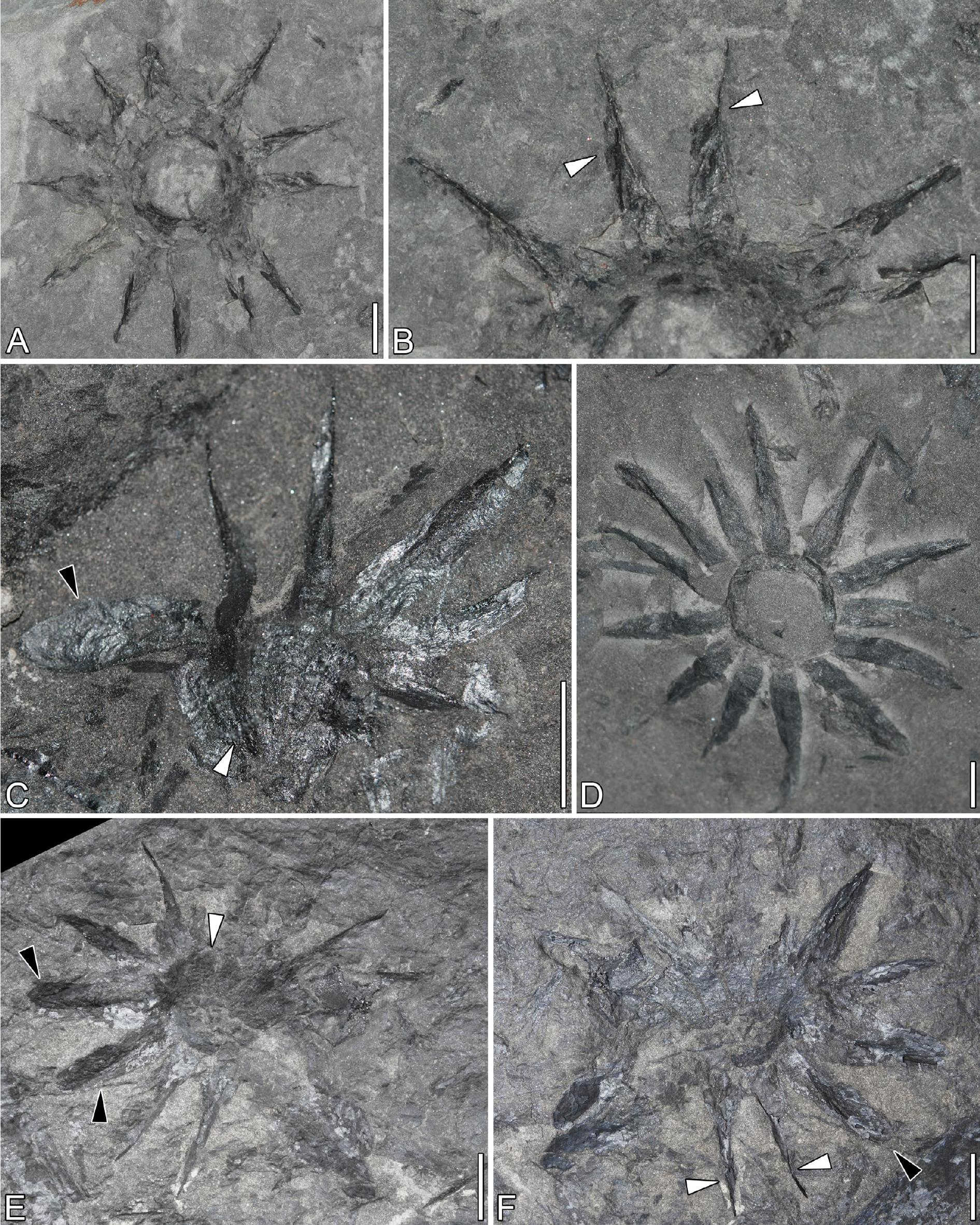
Disarticulated microsporangiate flowers assigned to Kimuriella densifolia

Pott and Takimoto (2022) investigated 42 slabs collected from the Tochikubo Formation, six of which contained articulated plant remains. Of the specimens within these slabs, they designated MM-000923a as the holotype (its counterpart being MM-000927a) with five other specimens being designated as epitypes (disarticulated male organs MM-000923b, MM-000927b; articulated foliage around a developing female organ MM-000927b; disarticulated male organ MM-000904). The holotype preserves a branch with female organ and seed cone terminating growth intervals.

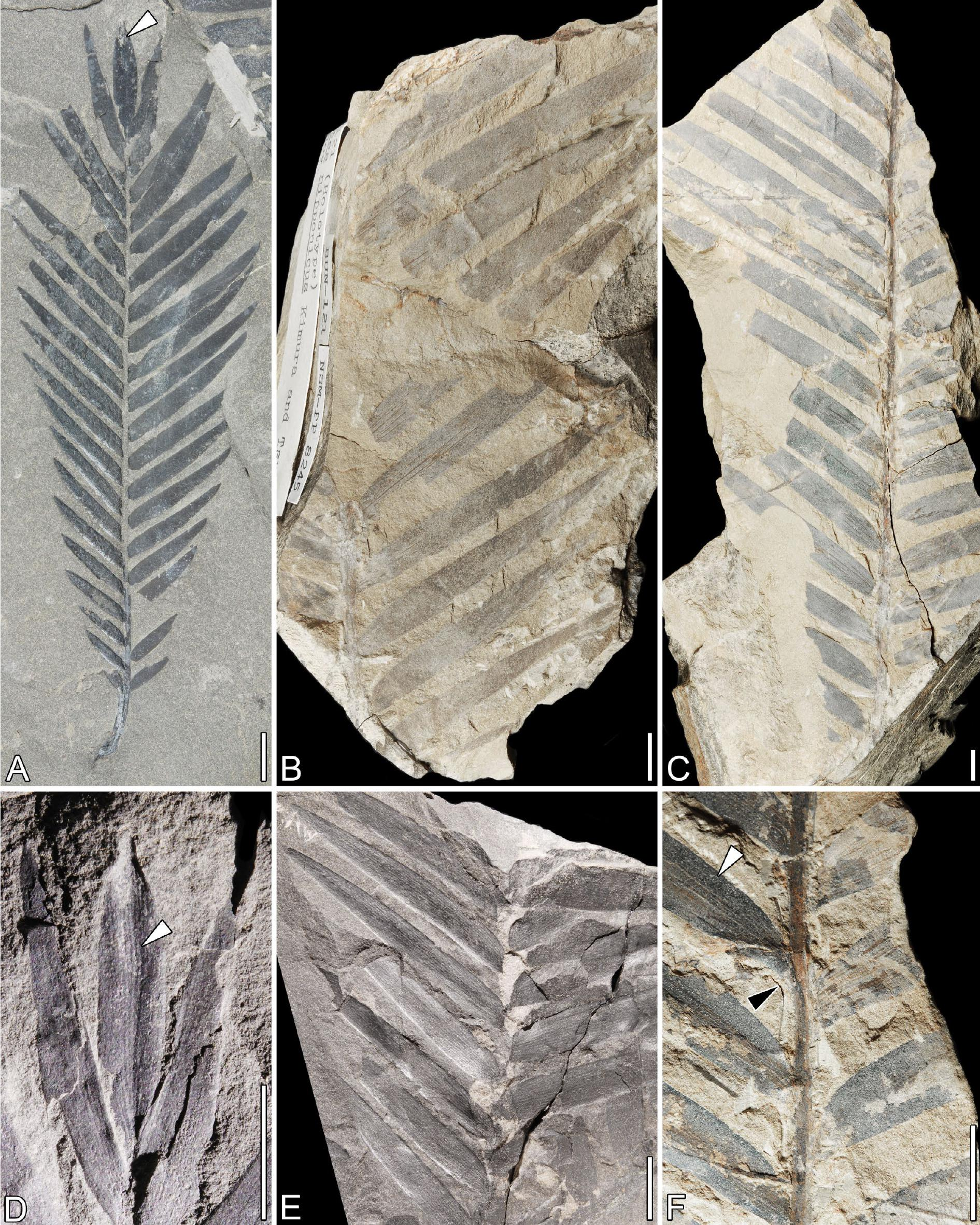
Holotype (NSM-PP-8245) and paratype (NSM-PP-8246) of Zamites nipponicus as well as other specimens, these are assigned to Kimuriella densifolia

The authors also note that previously described material from the Isokusa Formation shares a striking resemblance to Kimuriella in both male organs and foliage, the foliage — initially described as cfr. Zamites feneonis — was concluded to be conspecific with Zamites nipponicus by Kimura and Ohana (1988a). Though, no examination of this specimen was made and the authors leave this assignment as tentative.

== Palaeobiology ==
Kimuriella preserves similar growth structures to other bennettitaleans, including divaricately branched growth with the reproductive organs growing on the terminal end of the main axis, later inducing lateral branching during the next growth period (the period probably being seasonally or annually). They described the overall architecture of the plant as "a low-growing shrub-like plant probably up to 2–3 m tall... [with] divaricately branched axes". One thing to note is that the fossils (such as the holotype) show that only one female reproductive organ is receptive per active branch with the expected other lateral branch being missing.

== Palaeoecology ==
The Tochikubo Formation, from which Kimuriella is known, has been interpreted as a mostly non-marine fluvial to near-shore and low-energy lake deposit, with the facies of the formation changing in ascending order from fluvial to lake association, flood plain, alluvial fan into a delta-front coastal environment in its uppermost part.

The authors that described the plant state that it "probably formed tangled shrub thickets in brackish to tidal mudflat areas or delta settings colonising ephemeral isles or sand bars that were regularly flooded such as in mangroves".
