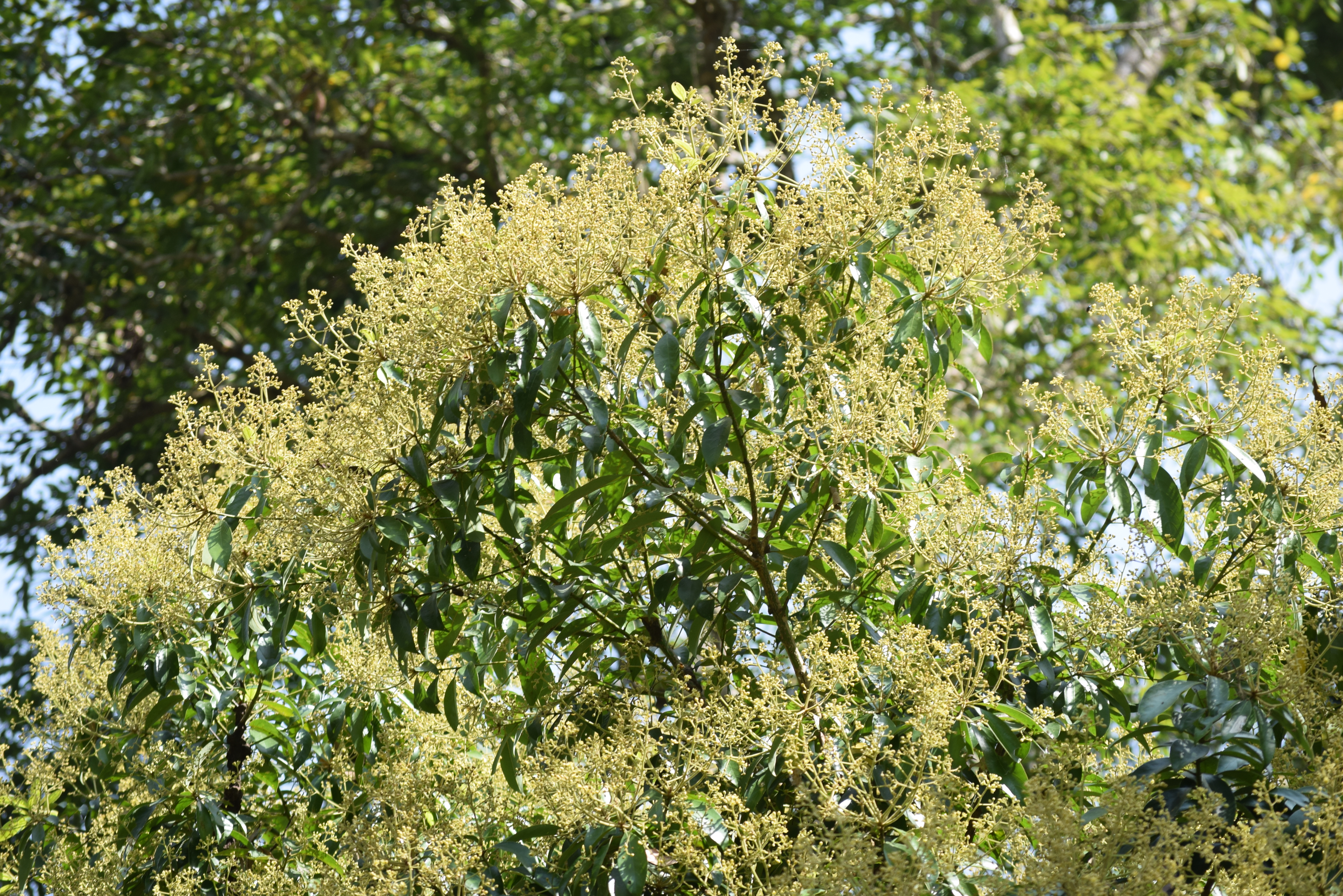
- Swintonia floribunda

Scientific classification
- Kingdom: Plantae
- Clade: Embryophytes
- Clade: Tracheophytes
- Clade: Angiosperms
- Clade: Eudicots
- Clade: Rosids
- Order: Sapindales
- Family: Anacardiaceae
- Subfamily: Anacardioideae
- Genus: Swintonia; Griff.

Synonyms
- Anauxanopetalum Teijsm. & Binn.; Astropetalum Griff.

= Swintonia =

Genus of flowering plants

Swintonia is a genus of plants in the family Anacardiaceae. It includes 13 species native to Bangladesh, eastern India, Indochina, and western Malesia (Peninsular Malaysia, Sumatra, Borneo, and the Philippines).

== Species ==
As of 2026, Plants of the World Online accepts the following species.

1. Swintonia acuta Engl.
2. Swintonia floribunda Griff. - type species
3. Swintonia foxworthyi Elmer
4. Swintonia glauca Engl.
5. Swintonia minuta Evrard
6. Swintonia minutalata Ding Hou
7. Swintonia parkinsonii (C.E.C.Fisch.) Kosterm.
8. Swintonia pierrei Hance
9. Swintonia robinsonii Ridl.
10. Swintonia sarawakana Kochummen
11. Swintonia schwenkii (Teijsm. & Binn.) Teijsm. & Binn.
12. Swintonia spicifera Hook.f.
13. Swintonia whitmorei (Kochummen) Kosterm.
