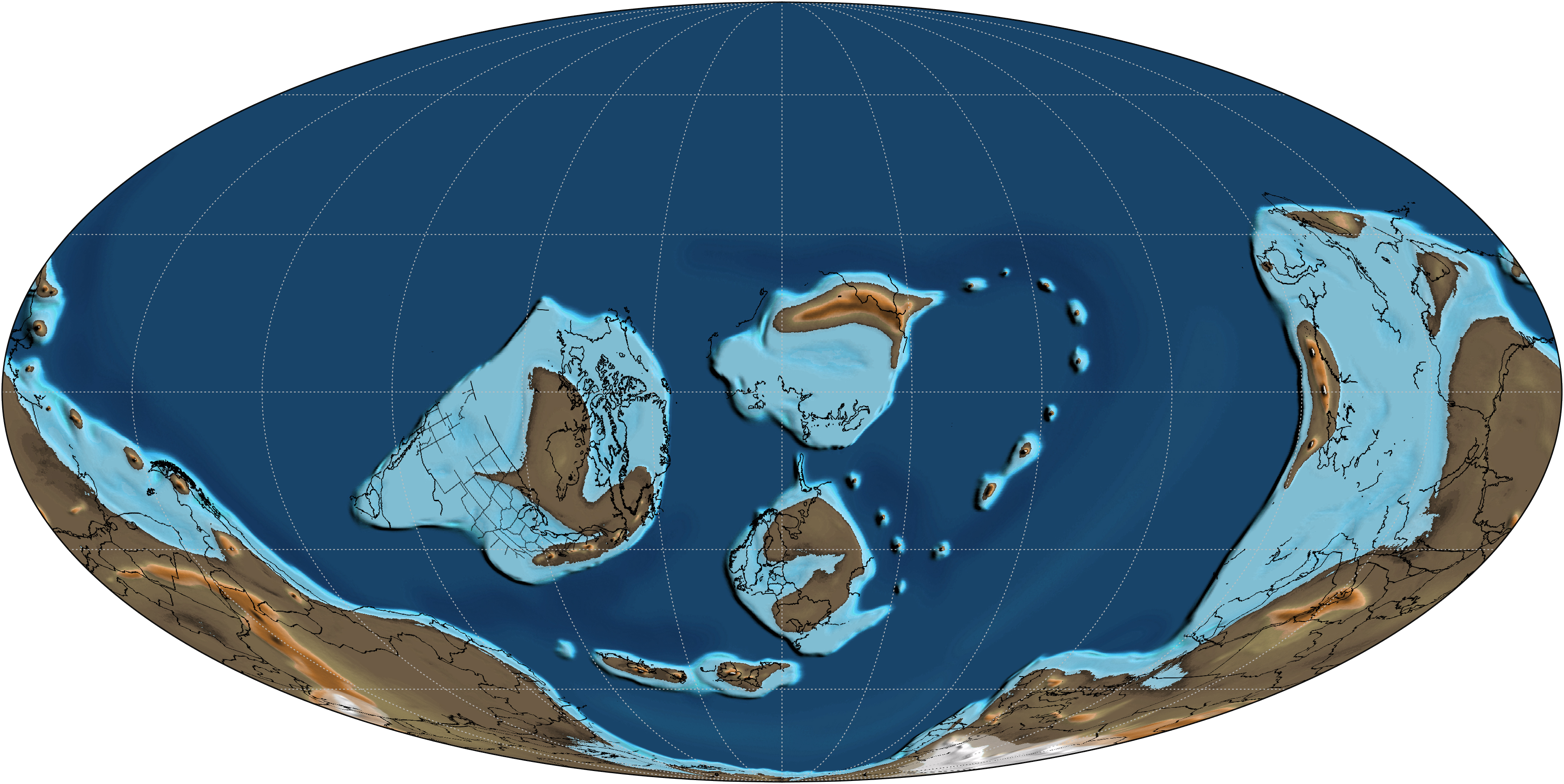
- Map of the Earth during the Ordovician period around 465 million years ago

Scientific classification
- Domain: Eukaryota
- Clade: Archaeplastida
- Clade: Viridiplantae
- Division: Charophyta
- Class: Charophyceae
- Genus: †Tarimochara
- Species: †T. miraclensis

Binomial name
- †Tarimochara miraclensis Liu, Wu & Riding

= Tarimochara =

Tarimochara Temporal range: Late Ordovician

Extinct genus of algae

Tarimochara is an extinct genus of algae in the class Charophyceae that lived during the late Ordovician period around 454-449 million years ago in China. This genus contains only one species, Tarimochara micaclensis. It has some key morphological innovations associated with an transition between streptophyte algae and land plants. It lived in shallow marine environments such as carbonate platforms.
