= Orestovia =

Orestovia Temporal range: Lower Devonian–Middle Devonian

Scientific classification
- Kingdom: Plantae
- Division: incertae sedis
- Genus: †Orestovia

Species
- O. devonica Ergolskaya, (type) 1936; O. petzii; O. voronejiensis

Extinct genus of enigmatic organisms

Orestovia is a lower-middle Devonian thallophyte known from fossilised cuticle, cutinite. Described as an enigmatic taxa, Orestovia has variously been categorised as a brown algae, an algae of unknown affinities, a thalloid non-vascular plant, and an early vascular plant, or even the result of the alternation of generations of some other group.

Orestovia are typically found as paper coals. Individual remains are naked, unbranched, cutinised axes up to 20 cm in length and 2 cm wide, tapering distally. Most specimens are preserved as hollow, cuticular sheaths that often exhibit an epidermis-like cellular pattern. The cuticles bear structures which have been described as representing stomata. Spores are sometimes preserved between its layers of cuticle. A reconstruction looks similar to the extant fern Pilularia globulifera (Marsileaceae) in the water with a creeping rhizome and naked, upright axes.

Orestovia remains have been documented from the following locations, In Russia: Pavlovsk, Voronezh Oblast, Graham Bell Island, Arctic Ocean and the Kuznetsk Basin, Siberia. In China: Luquan, Yunnan.
