= Tochikubo Formation =

Geologic formation in Japan

- Stratigraphic range: Late Jurassic Oxfordian
- Type: Geological formation
- Unit of: Somanakamura Group
- Underlies: Nakanosawa Formation
- Overlies: Yamagami Formation
- Area: Japan
- Thickness: Up to 350 m

Lithology
- Primary: Sandstone, Shale

Location
- Region: Fukushima Prefecture
- Country: Japan
- Extent: Abukuma Highlands, eastern Honshu

The Tochikubo Formation is a Jurassic geologic formation in northern Honshu, Japan, dating to the Oxfordian stage of the Late Jurassic. Fossil ornithopod tracks have been reported from the formation. As well as the bennettitaleans Kimuriella and Ohaniella.

== Fossil content ==
Color key: Taxon / Reclassified taxon / Taxon falsely reported as present / Dubious taxon or junior synonym / Ichnotaxon / Ootaxon / Morphotaxon	Notes; Uncertain or tentative taxa are in small text; ~~crossed out~~ taxa are discredited.

=== Plants ===
Plants of the Tochikubo Formation
Genus	Species	Location	Stratigraphic position	Material	Notes	Image
Kimuriella	K. densifolia	Fukushima	Oxfordian		A williamsoniacean bennettitalean	
Encephalartites	E. nipponensis	Fukushima	Oxforian		A cycad	
Nilssoniocladus	N. japonicus	Fukushima	Oxfordian		A nilssoniacean cyclad	
Nilssoniocladus	N. tairae	Fukushima	Oxfordian		A nilssoniacean cyclad	
Ohaniella	O. ptilofolia	Fukushima	Oxfordian		A williamsoniacean bennettitalean	

== See also ==
- List of dinosaur-bearing rock formations
  - List of stratigraphic units with ornithischian tracks
    - Ornithopod tracks
