= Amino acid dating =

Paleontological dating technique

Amino acid dating or racemization dating is a dating technique used to estimate the age of a specimen in paleobiology, molecular paleontology, archaeology, forensic science, taphonomy, sedimentary geology and other fields. This technique relates changes in amino acid molecules to the time elapsed since they were formed.

== Background ==
=== Chemistry ===
L-isoleucine, an amino acid used in amino acid dating analysis

D-alloisoleucine, the epimer of L-isoleucine

Amino acids are a set of organic compounds that are used by living organisms to synthesise proteins. All amino acids (except glycine) have one or more pairs of stereoisomers, isomers which share the same bond order but are organized differently in 3D space. A given pair of stereoisomers that are optically active and non-superimposable mirror images of each other are called enantiomers; pairs that are not mirror images are diastereomers or epimers. Stereoisomers of the same molecule may undergo reactions (known as racemization or epimerization respective to the type of stereoisomer pair involved) that convert them to other stereoisomers.

Biological systems are stereoselective, preferring certain stereoisomers for chemical reactions; living organisms keep all their amino acids in their "left-handed" (L or levo-) forms (a state called homochirality) because they are unable to use the "right-handed" (D or dextro-) forms for protein synthesis.

When an organism becomes unable to keep its amino acids in that unbalanced ratio, such as by dying or shedding tissue, the system will proceed towards chemical equilibrium. Measuring the progress of this interconversion reaction allows estimation of an organism's time of death, if environmental variables like moisture and temperature are accounted for.

=== Amino acid properties and environmental conditions ===
Amino acids commonly used for amino acid dating analysis are leucine, aspartic acid, valine, glutamic acid, and diastereomer isoleucine.

The properties of the amino acid(s) chosen for analysis influence what kind of dating can be performed. Amino acid interconversion reactions happen at a variety of speeds: aspartic acid racemizes very quickly and hence is used for recent samples where high resolution is important, while valine and leucine take much longer to racemize and are more appropriate for older fossils. Additionally, these reaction rates are sensitive to temperature, to a degree depending on the specific interconversion reaction. The racemization rate of aspartic acid varies with small changes in temperature, while valine's racemization rate is less temperature dependent.

Besides higher temperatures accelerating interconversion reactions, other environmental variables also impact reaction rates. Wetter environments produce faster reaction rates, and interconversion reactions may be catalyzed by the presence of acids, bases, or metal cations. The chosen host organisms or taxa also introduce bias into age estimates.

Amino acids which are bound within peptides interconvert more slowly than those which are free or are occupying the terminal position of peptide chains. The degree of hydrolysis of peptides (and therefore the speed at which equilibrium approaches) increases with fossil age.

== Applications ==
Amino acid dating has applications in archaeology, stratigraphy, oceanography, paleogeography, paleobiology, and paleoclimatology. These include dating correlation, relative dating, sedimentation rate analysis, sediment transport studies, conservation paleobiology, taphonomy and time-averaging,sea level determinations, and thermal history reconstructions.

Amino acid dating may be used to date samples too old for radiocarbon dating (which has a maximum range of 40 ka to 0 ka), or too young for potassium-argon dating (which has a range of 40 ka to 150 ka) to be helpful. Verification of radiocarbon and other dating techniques by comparison with amino acid dating is also possible. The 'filling in' of large probability ranges, such as those caused by variation in ^{14}C levels throughout the biosphere, has sometimes been possible as well.

Bone, shell, and sediment studies have contributed much to the paleontological record, including that relating to hominoids. Many studies have been undertaken in paleopathology and dietary selection, paleozoogeography and indigeneity, taxonomy and taphonomy, and DNA viability. Human cultural changes and their effects on local ecologies have been assessed using this technique; the differentiation of cooked from uncooked bone, shell, and residue is sometimes possible.

Amino acid racemization also has a role in tissue and protein degradation studies, particularly useful in developing museum preservation methods. These studies have produced models of protein adhesive and other biopolymer deteriorations and the concurrent pore system development. The reduction in bodily repair capability during aging is important to studies of senescence and age-associated disease, and allows the determination of age in living animals.

Forensic science can use this technique to estimate the age of a cadaver or an objet d'art to determine authenticity.

== Methods ==
Amino acid racemization analysis consists of sample preparation, isolating the amino acid wanted, and measuring its D:L ratio. Sample preparation entails the identification, raw extraction, and separation of proteins into their constituent amino acids, typically by grinding the sample followed by acid hydrolysis. The amino acid derivative hydrolysis product can be combined with a chiral specific fluorescent, separated by chromatography or electrophoresis, and the particular amino acid D:L ratio determined by fluorescence. Alternatively, the particular amino acid can be separated by chromatography or electrophoresis, combined with a metal cation, and the D:L ratio determined by mass spectrometry.

Conventional racemization analysis tends to report a D-alloisoleucine / L-isoleucine ratio (A/I or D/L ratio). This stereoisomer pair has the advantages of being relatively easy to measure and being chronologically useful through the Quaternary.

Reversed phase HPLC techniques can measure up to 9 amino acids useful in geochronology over different time scales on a single chromatogram (aspartic acid, glutamic acid, serine, alanine, arginine, tyrosine, valine, phenylalanine, leucine).

Amino acid dating relies on the assumption that the fraction of amino acids being studied has been a closed system since its formation, exchanging nothing with its surroundings. Removing amino acids that have diffused into the sample from its surroundings decreases variability in results by ensuring that analysis is performed only on the most representative fraction of amino acids. These cleaning methods may include soaking powdered biomineral samples in bleach prior to extracting amino acids, destroying the amino acids in the more porous, open areas while leaving the fraction trapped inside the grains unscathed.

== See also ==
- Paleoproteomics
