= Garnsey =

Garnsey is a surname. It may refer to:

- Bruce H. Garnsey
- Charles Frederick Garnsey (1828–1894), Anglican priest
- Daniel G. Garnsey (1779–1851), American politician
- David Garnsey (1909–1996), Australian bishop
- George O. Garnsey (1840–1923), American architect
- Peter Garnsey (born 1938), British historian

== See also ==
- Garnsey kill site, New Mexico, USA
