= Molecular paleontology =

Molecular paleontology refers to the recovery and analysis of DNA, proteins, carbohydrates, or lipids, and their diagenetic products from ancient human, animal, and plant remains. The field of molecular paleontology has yielded important insights into evolutionary events, species' diasporas, and the discovery and characterization of extinct species.

In shallow time, advancements in the field of molecular paleontology have allowed scientists to pursue evolutionary questions on a genetic level rather than relying on phenotypic variation alone. By applying molecular analytical techniques to DNA in recent animal remains, one can quantify the level of relatedness between any two organisms for which DNA has been recovered. Using various biotechnological techniques such as DNA isolation, amplification, and sequencing scientists have been able to acquire and expand insights into the divergence and evolutionary history of countless recently extinct organisms. In February 2021, scientists reported, for the first time, the sequencing of DNA from animal remains, a mammoth in this instance, over a million years old, the oldest DNA sequenced to date.

In deep time, compositional heterogeneities in carbonaceous remains of a diversity of animals, ranging in age from the Neoproterozoic to the Recent, have been linked to biological signatures encoded in modern biomolecules via a cascade of oxidative fossilization reactions. The macromolecular composition of carbonaceous fossils, some Tonian in age, preserve biological signatures reflecting original biomineralization, tissue types, metabolism, and relationship affinities (phylogeny).

== History ==
The study of molecular paleontology is said to have begun with the discovery by Abelson of 360 million year old amino acids preserved in fossil shells. However, Svante Pääbo is often the one considered to be the founder of the field of molecular paleontology.

The field of molecular paleontology has had several major advances since the 1950s and is a continuously growing field. Below is a timeline showing notable contributions that have been made.

=== Timeline ===
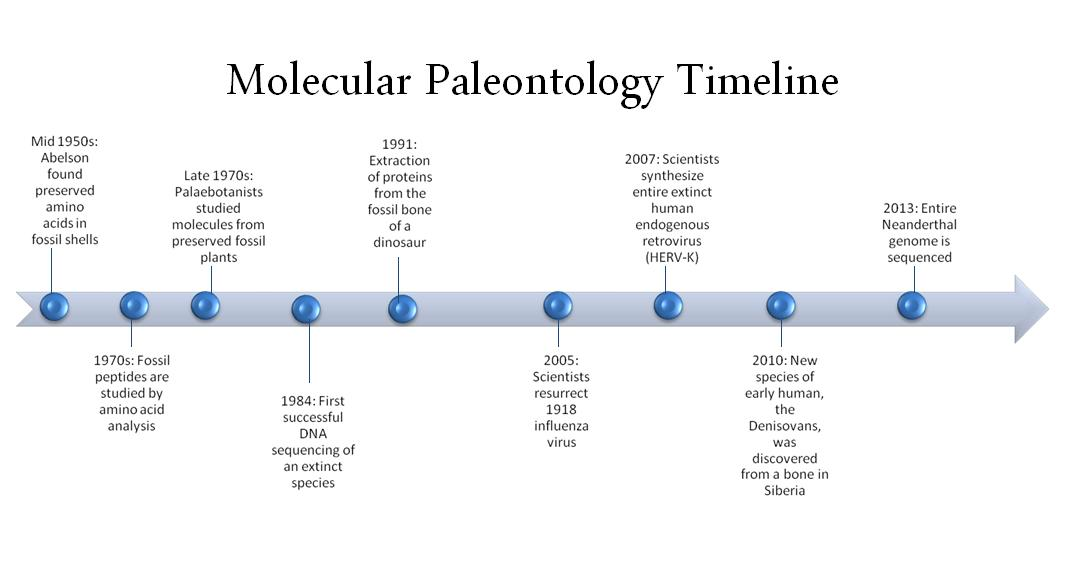
A timeline demonstrating important dates in molecular paleontology. All of these dates are listed and specifically sourced in the History section under Timeline.

mid-1950s: Abelson found preserved amino acids in fossil shells that were about 360 million years old. Produced idea of comparing fossil amino acid sequences with existing organism so that molecular evolution could be studied.

1970s: Fossil peptides are studied by amino acid analysis. Start to use whole peptides and immunological methods.

Late 1970s: Palaeobotanists (can also be spelled as Paleobotanists) studied molecules from well-preserved fossil plants.

1984: The first successful DNA sequencing of an extinct species, the quagga, a zebra-like species.

1991: Published article on the successful extraction of proteins from the fossil bone of a dinosaur, specifically the Seismosaurus.

2005: Scientists resurrect extinct 1918 influenza virus.

2006: Neanderthals nuclear DNA sequence segments begin to be analyzed and published.

2007: Scientists synthesize entire extinct human endogenous retrovirus (HERV-K) from scratch.

2010: A new species of early hominid, the Denisovans, discovered from mitochondrial and nuclear genomes recovered from bone found in a cave in Siberia. Analysis showed that the Denisovan specimen lived approximately 41,000 years ago, and shared a common ancestor with both modern humans and Neanderthals approximately 1 million years ago in Africa.

2013: The first entire Neanderthal genome is successfully sequenced. More information can be found at the Neanderthal genome project.

2013: A 400,000-year-old specimen with remnant mitochondrial DNA sequenced and is found to be a common ancestor to Neanderthals and Denisovans, Homo heidelbergensis.

2013: Mary Schweitzer and colleagues propose the first chemical mechanism explaining the potential preservation of vertebrate cells and soft tissues into the fossil record. The mechanism proposes that free oxygen radicals, potentially produced by redox-active iron, induce biomolecule crosslinking. This crosslinking mechanism is somewhat analogous to the crosslinking that occurs during histological tissue fixation, such as with formaldehyde. The authors also suggest the source of iron to be the hemoglobin from the deceased organism.

2015: A 110,000-year-old fossil tooth containing DNA from Denisovans was reported.

2018: Molecular paleobiologists link polymers of N-, O-, S-heterocycle composition (AGEs/ALEs, as referred to in the cited publication, Wiemann et al. 2018) in carbonaceous fossil remains mechanistically to structural biomolecules in original tissues. Through oxidative crosslinking, a process similar to the Maillard reaction, nucleophilic amino acid residues condense with Reactive Carbonyl Species derived from lipids and sugars. The processes of biomolecule fossilization, identified via Raman spectroscopy of modern and fossil tissues, experimental modelling, and statistical data evaluation, include Advanced Glycosylation and Advanced Lipoxidation.

2019: An independent laboratory of Molecular Paleontologists confirms the transformation of biomolecules through Advanced Glycosylation and Lipoxidation during fossilization. The authors use Synchrotron Fourier-Transform Infrared spectroscopy.

2020: Wiemann and colleagues identify biological signatures reflecting original biomineralization, tissue types, metabolism, and relationship affinity (phylogeny) in preserved compositional heterogeneities of a diversity of carbonaceous animal fossils. This is the first large-scale analysis of fossils ranging in age from the Neoproterozoic to the Recent, and the first published record of biological signals found in complex organic matter. The authors rely on statistical analyses of a uniquely large Raman spectroscopy data set.

2021: Geochemists find tissue type signals in the composition of carbonaceous fossils dating back to the Tonian, and apply these signals to identify epibionts. The authors use Raman spectroscopy.

2022: Raman spectroscopy data revealing patterns in the fossilization of structural biomolecules have been replicated with Fourier-Transform Infrared spectroscopy and a diversity of different Raman instruments, filters, and excitation sources.

2023: The first in-depth chemical description of how original, biological cells and tissues fossilize is published. Importantly, the study shows that the free oxygen radical hypothesis (proposed by Mary Schweitzer and colleagues in 2013) is in many cases identical to the AGE/ALE formation hypothesis (proposed by Jasmina Wiemann and colleagues in 2018). The combined hypotheses, along with thermal maturation and carbonization, form a loose framework for biological cell and tissue fossilization.

=== The quagga ===
The first successful DNA sequencing of an extinct species was in 1984, from a 150-year-old museum specimen of the quagga, a zebra-like species. Mitochondrial DNA (also known as mtDNA) was sequenced from desiccated muscle of the quagga, and was found to differ by 12 base substitutions from the mitochondrial DNA of a mountain zebra. It was concluded that these two species had a common ancestor 3-4 million years ago, which is consistent with known fossil evidence of the species.

=== Denisovans ===
The Denisovans of Eurasia, a hominid species related to Neanderthals and humans, was discovered as a direct result of DNA sequencing of a 41,000-year-old specimen recovered in 2008. Analysis of the mitochondrial DNA from a retrieved finger bone showed the specimen to be genetically distinct from both humans and Neanderthals. Two teeth and a toe bone were later found to belong to different individuals with the same population. Analysis suggests that both the Neanderthals and Denisovans were already present throughout Eurasia when modern humans arrived. In November 2015, scientists reported finding a fossil tooth containing DNA from Denisovans, and estimated its age at 110,000-years-old.

==== Mitochondrial DNA analysis ====
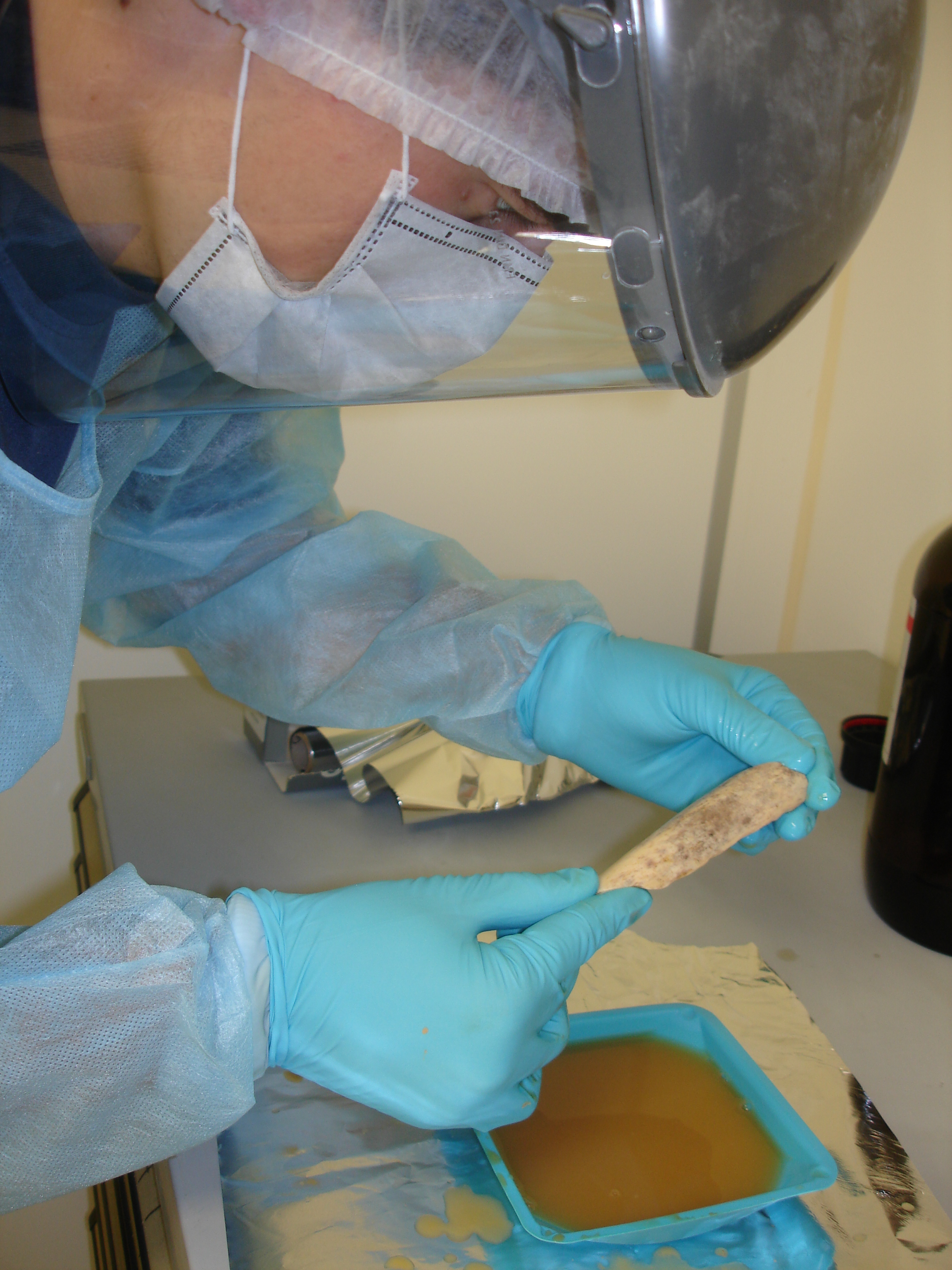
Neanderthal DNA extraction. Working in a clean room, researchers at the Max Planck Institute for Evolutionary Anthropology in Leipzig, Germany, took extensive precautions to avoid contaminating Neanderthal DNA samples - extracted from bones like this one - with DNA from any other source, including modern humans. NHGRI researchers are part of the international team that sequenced the genome of the Neanderthal, Homo neanderthalensis.

The mtDNA from the Denisovan finger bone differs from that of modern humans by 385 bases (nucleotides) in the mtDNA strand out of approximately 16,500, whereas the difference between modern humans and Neanderthals is around 202 bases. In contrast, the difference between chimpanzees and modern humans is approximately 1,462 mtDNA base pairs. This suggested a divergence time around one million years ago. The mtDNA from a tooth bore a high similarity to that of the finger bone, indicating they belonged to the same population. From a second tooth, an mtDNA sequence was recovered that showed an unexpectedly large number of genetic differences compared to that found in the other tooth and the finger, suggesting a high degree of mtDNA diversity. These two individuals from the same cave showed more diversity than seen among sampled Neanderthals from all of Eurasia, and were as different as modern-day humans from different continents.

==== Nuclear genome analysis ====
Isolation and sequencing of nuclear DNA has also been accomplished from the Denisova finger bone. This specimen showed an unusual degree of DNA preservation and low level of contamination. They were able to achieve near-complete genomic sequencing, allowing a detailed comparison with Neanderthal and modern humans. From this analysis, they concluded, in spite of the apparent divergence of their mitochondrial sequence, the Denisova population along with Neanderthal shared a common branch from the lineage leading to modern African humans. The estimated average time of divergence between Denisovan and Neanderthal sequences is 640,000 years ago, and the time between both of these and the sequences of modern Africans is 804,000 years ago. They suggest the divergence of the Denisova mtDNA results either from the persistence of a lineage purged from the other branches of humanity through genetic drift or else an introgression from an older hominin lineage.

=== Homo heidelbergensis ===
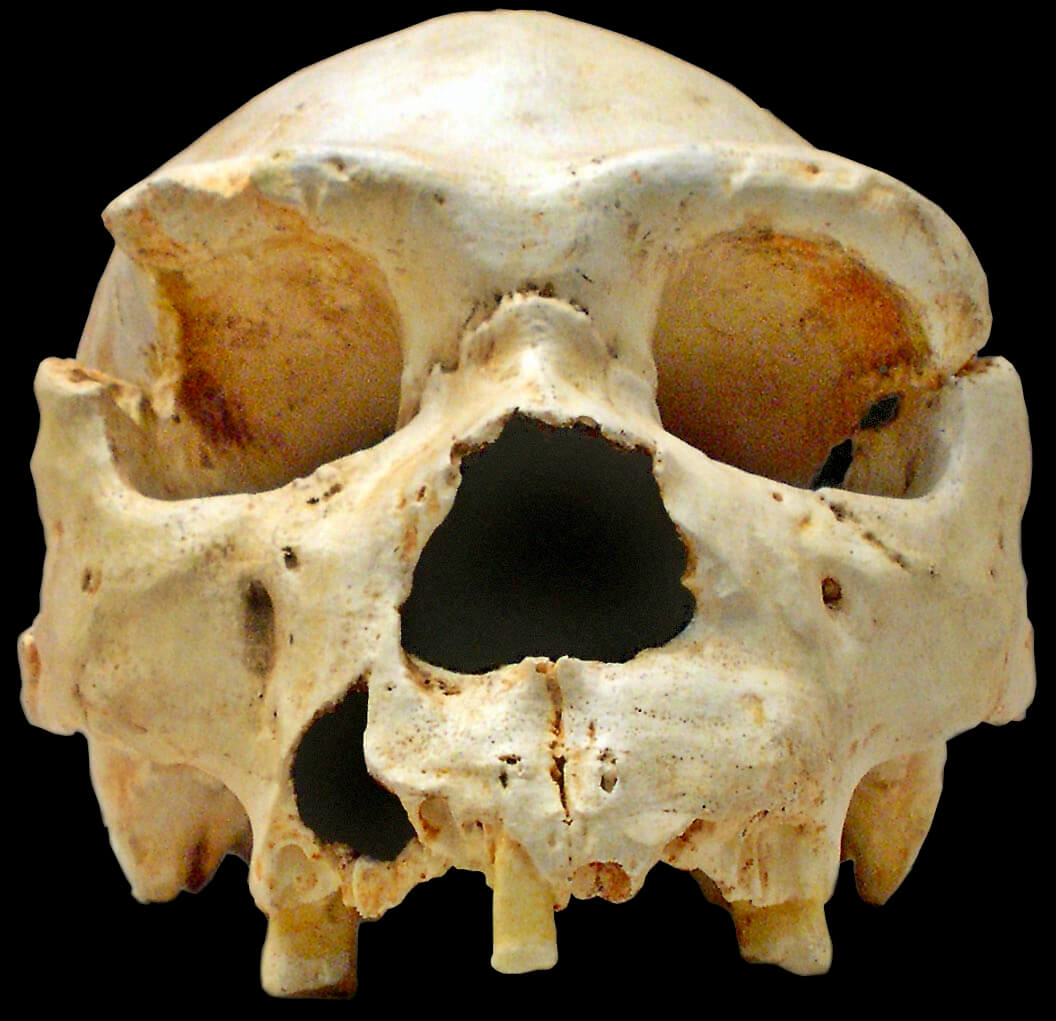
"Homo heidelbergensis Cranium 5 is one of the most important discoveries in the Sima de los Huesos, Atapuerca (Spain). The mandible of this cranium appeared, nearly intact, some years after its find, close to the same location.

Homo heidelbergensis was first discovered in 1907 near Heidelberg, Germany and later also found elsewhere in Europe, Africa, and Asia. However it was not until 2013 that a specimen with retrievable DNA was found, in a ~400,000 year old femur found in the Sima de los Huesos Cave in Spain. The femur was found to contain both mtDNA and nuclear DNA. Improvements in DNA extraction and library preparation techniques allowed for mtDNA to be successfully isolated and sequenced, however the nuclear DNA was found to be too degraded in the observed specimen, and was also contaminated with DNA from an ancient cave bear (Ursus deningeri) present in the cave. The mtDNA analysis found a surprising link between the specimen and the Denisovans, and this finding raised many questions. Several scenarios were proposed in a January 2014 paper titled "A mitochondrial genome sequence of a hominin from Sima de los Huesos", elucidating the lack of convergence in the scientific community on how Homo heidelbergensis is related to other known hominin groups. One plausible scenario that the authors proposed was that the H. heidelbergensis was an ancestor to both Denisovans and Neanderthals. Completely sequenced nuclear genomes from both Denisovans and Neanderthals suggest a common ancestor approximately 700,000 years ago, and one leading researcher in the field, Svante Paabo, suggests that perhaps this new hominin group is that early ancestor.

== Applications ==
=== Discovery and characterization of new species ===
Molecular paleontology techniques applied to fossils have contributed to the discovery and characterization of several new species, including the Denisovans and Homo heidelbergensis. We have been able to better understand the path that humans took as they populated the earth, and what species were present during this diaspora.

=== De-extinction ===
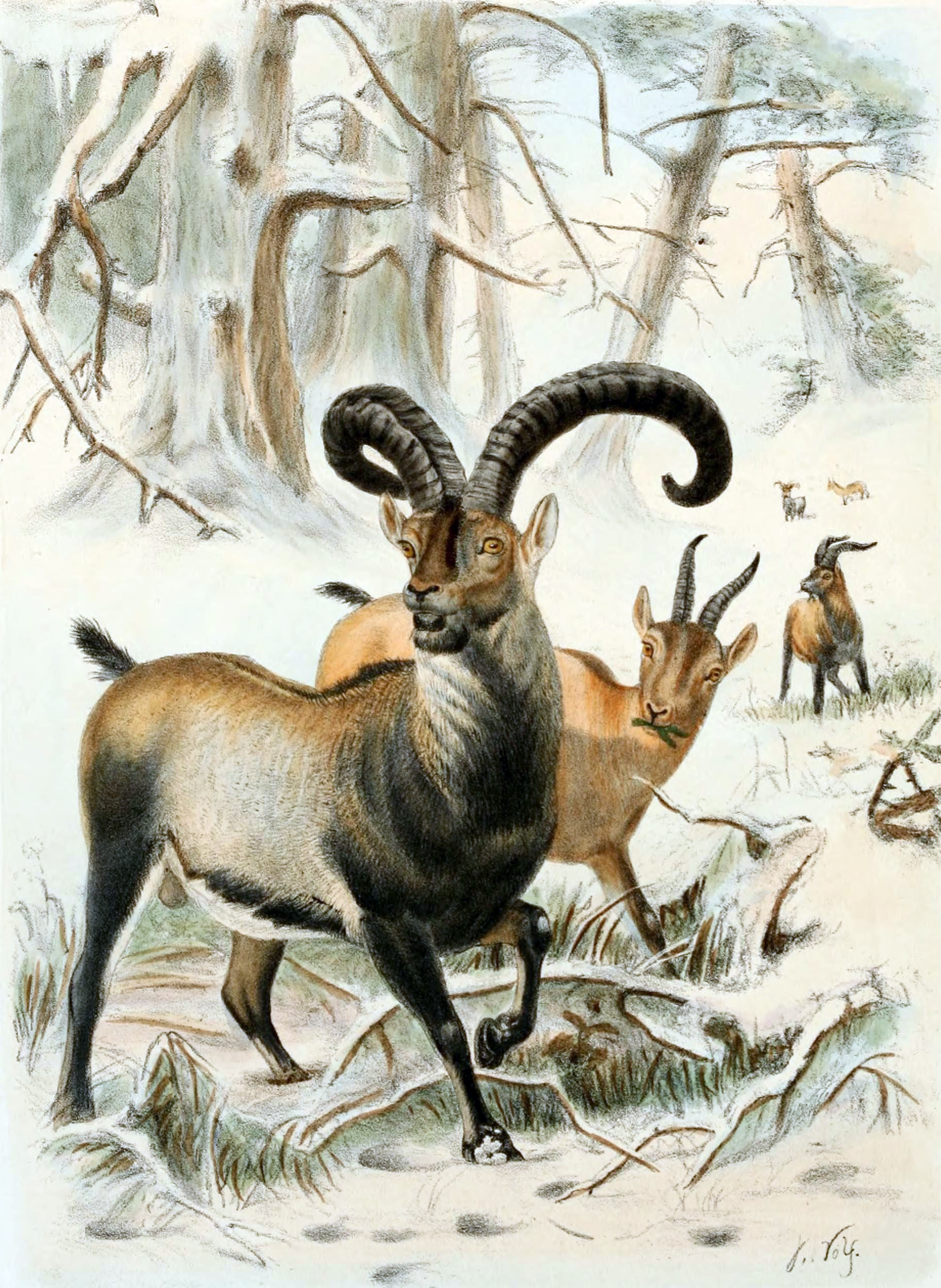
The Pyrenean ibex was temporarily brought back from extinction in 2003.

It is now possible to revive extinct species using molecular paleontology techniques. This was first accomplished via cloning in 2003 with the Pyrenean ibex, a type of wild goat that became extinct in 2000. Nuclei from the Pyrenean ibex's cells were injected into goat eggs emptied of their own DNA, and implanted into surrogate goat mothers. The offspring lived only seven minutes after birth, due to defects in its lungs. Other cloned animals have been observed to have similar lung defects.

There are many species that have gone extinct as a direct result of human activity. Some examples include the dodo, the great auk, the Tasmanian tiger, the Chinese river dolphin, and the passenger pigeon. An extinct species can be revived by using allelic replacement of a closely related species that is still living. By only having to replace a few genes within an organism, instead of having to build the extinct species' genome from scratch, it could be possible to bring back several species in this way, even Neanderthals.

The ethics surrounding the re-introduction of extinct species are very controversial. Critics of bringing extinct species back to life contend that it would divert limited money and resources from protecting the world's current biodiversity problems. With current extinction rates approximated to be 100 to 1,000 times the background extinction rate, it is feared that a de-extinction program might lessen public concerns over the current mass extinction crisis, if it is believed that these species can simply be brought back to life. As the editors of a Scientific American article on de-extinction pose: Should we bring back the woolly mammoth only to let elephants become extinct in the meantime? The main driving factor for the extinction of most species in this era (post 10,000 BC) is the loss of habitat, and temporarily bringing back an extinct species will not recreate the environment they once inhabited.

Proponents of de-extinction, such as George Church, speak of many potential benefits. Reintroducing an extinct keystone species, such as the woolly mammoth, could help re-balance the ecosystems that once depended on them. Some extinct species could create broad benefits for the environments they once inhabited, if returned. For example, woolly mammoths may be able to slow the melting of the Russian and Arctic tundra in several ways such as eating dead grass so that new grass can grow and take root, and periodically breaking up the snow, subjecting the ground below to the arctic air. These techniques could also be used to reintroduce genetic diversity in a threatened species, or even introduce new genes and traits to allow the animals to compete better in a changing environment.

== Research and technology ==
When a new potential specimen is found, scientists normally first analyze for cell and tissue preservation using histological techniques, and test the conditions for the survivability of DNA. They will then attempt to isolate a DNA sample using the technique described below, and conduct a PCR amplification of the DNA to increase the amount of DNA available for testing. This amplified DNA is then sequenced. Care is taken to verify that the sequence matches the phylogenetic traits of the organism. When an organism dies, a technique called amino acid dating can be used to age the organism. It inspects the degree of racemization of aspartic acid, leucine, and alanine within the tissue. As time passes, the D/L ratio (where "D" and "L" are mirror images of each other) increase from 0 to 1. In samples where the D/L ratio of aspartic acid is greater than 0.08, ancient DNA sequences can not be retrieved (as of 1996).

=== Mitochondrial DNA vs. nuclear DNA ===
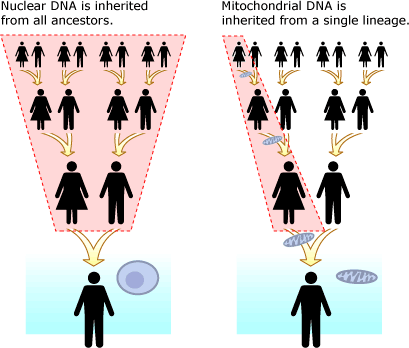
Unlike nuclear DNA (left), mitochondrial DNA is only inherited from the maternal lineage (right).

Mitochondrial DNA (mtDNA) is separate from one's nuclear DNA. It is present in organelles called mitochondria in each cell. Unlike nuclear DNA, which is inherited from both parents and rearranged every generation, an exact copy of mitochondrial DNA gets passed down from mother to her sons and daughters. The benefits of performing DNA analysis with Mitochondrial DNA is that it has a far smaller mutation rate than nuclear DNA, making tracking lineages on the scale of tens of thousands of years much easier. Knowing the base mutation rate for mtDNA, (in humans this rate is also known as the Human mitochondrial molecular clock) one can determine the amount of time any two lineages have been separated. Another advantage of mtDNA is that thousands of copies of it exist in every cell, whereas only two copies of nuclear DNA exist in each cell. All eukaryotes, a group which includes all plants, animals, and fungi, have mtDNA. A disadvantage of mtDNA is that only the maternal line is represented. For example, a child will inherit 1/8 of its DNA from each of its eight great-grandparents, however it will inherit an exact clone of its maternal great-grandmother's mtDNA. This is analogous to a child inheriting only his paternal great-grandfather's last name, and not a mix of all of the eight surnames.

=== Isolation ===
There are many things to consider when isolating a substance. First, depending upon what it is and where it is located, there are protocols that must be carried out in order to avoid contamination and further degradation of the sample. Then, handling of the materials is usually done in a physically isolated work area and under specific conditions (i.e. specific Temperature, moisture, etc...) also to avoid contamination and further loss of sample.

Once the material has been obtained, depending on what it is, there are different ways to isolate and purify it. DNA extraction from fossils is one of the more popular practices and there are different steps that can be taken to get the desired sample. DNA extracted from amber-entombed fossils can be taken from small samples and mixed with different substances, centrifuged, incubated, and centrifuged again. On the other hand, DNA extraction from insects can be done by grinding the sample, mixing it with buffer, and undergoing purification through glass fiber columns. In the end, regardless of how the sample was isolated for these fossils, the DNA isolated must be able to undergo amplification.

=== Amplification ===
Polymerase chain reaction

The field of molecular paleontology benefited greatly from the invention of the polymerase chain reaction(PCR), which allows one to make billions of copies of a DNA fragment from just a single preserved copy of the DNA. One of the biggest challenges up until this point was the extreme scarcity of recovered DNA because of degradation of the DNA over time.

=== Sequencing ===
DNA sequencing is done to determine the order of nucleotides and genes. There are many different materials from which DNA can be extracted. In animals, the mitochondrial chromosome can be used for molecular study. Chloroplasts can be studied in plants as a primary source of sequence data.

An evolutionary tree of mammals

In the end, the sequences generated are used to build evolutionary trees. Methods to match data sets include: maximum probability, minimum evolution (also known as neighbor-joining) which searches for the tree with shortest overall length, and the maximum parsimony method which finds the tree requiring the fewest character-state changes. The groups of species defined within a tree can also be later evaluated by statistical tests, such as the bootstrap method, to see if they are indeed significant.

== Limitations and challenges ==
Ideal environmental conditions for preserving DNA where the organism was desiccated and uncovered are difficult to come by, as well as maintaining their condition until analysis. Nuclear DNA normally degrades rapidly after death by endogenous hydrolytic processes, by UV radiation, and other environmental stressors.

Also, interactions with the organic breakdown products of surrounding soil have been found to help preserve biomolecular materials. However, they have also created the additional challenge of being able to separate the various components in order to be able to conduct the proper analysis on them. Some of these breakdowns have also been found to interfere with the action of some of the enzymes used during PCR.

Finally, one of the largest challenge in extracting ancient DNA, particularly in ancient human DNA, is in contamination during PCR. Small amounts of human DNA can contaminate the reagents used for extraction and PCR of ancient DNA. These problems can be overcome by rigorous care in the handling of all solutions as well as the glassware and other tools used in the process. It can also help if only one person performs the extractions, to minimize different types of DNA present.

== See also ==
- Ancient DNA
- Ancient protein
- Archaeogenetics
- Fossils
- Human mitochondrial DNA haplogroups
- Human Y-chromosome DNA haplogroup
- Models of DNA Evolution
- Molecular evolution
- Paleobiochemistry
- Paleobiology
- Paleobotany
