= Taphonomy =

Study of decomposition and fossilization of organisms

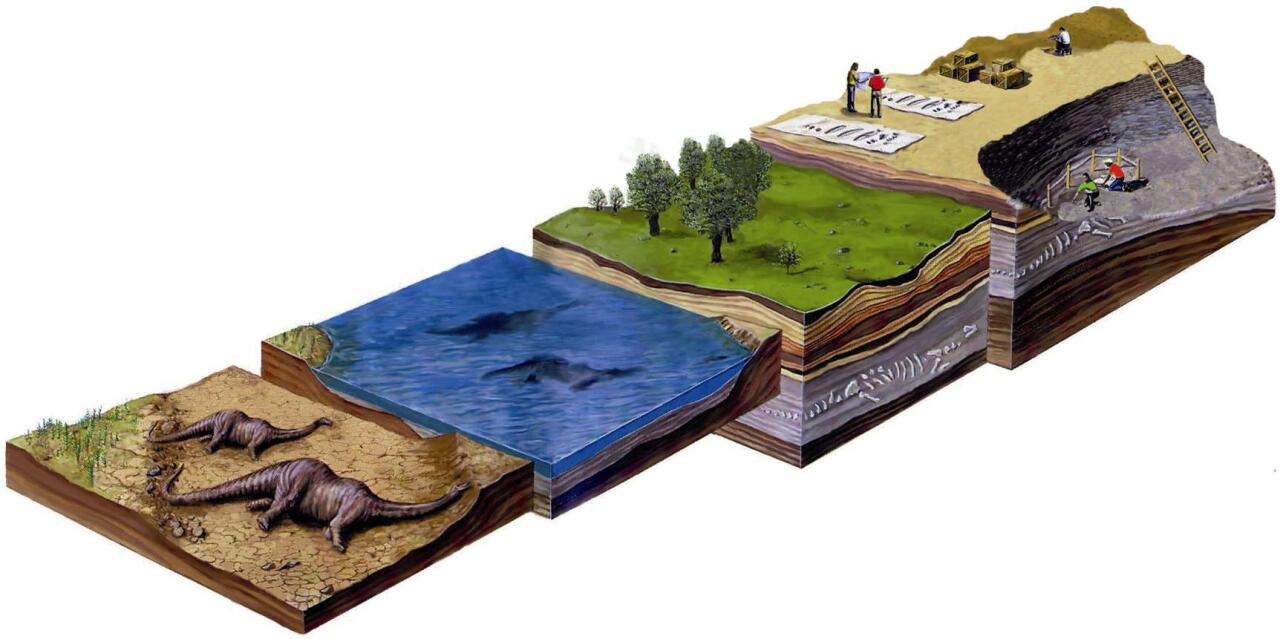
Fossilization process of a pair of sauropod dinosaurs, illustrating their preservation into fossils

Taphonomy is the study of how organisms decay and become fossilized or preserved in the paleontological record. The term taphonomy (from Greek táphos, τάφος 'burial' and nomos, νόμος 'law') was introduced to paleontology in 1940 by the Soviet scientist Ivan Efremov to describe the study of the transition of remains, parts, or products of organisms from the biosphere to the lithosphere.

The term taphomorph is used to describe fossil structures that represent poorly-preserved, deteriorated remains of a mixture of taxonomic groups, rather than of a single one.

== Description ==
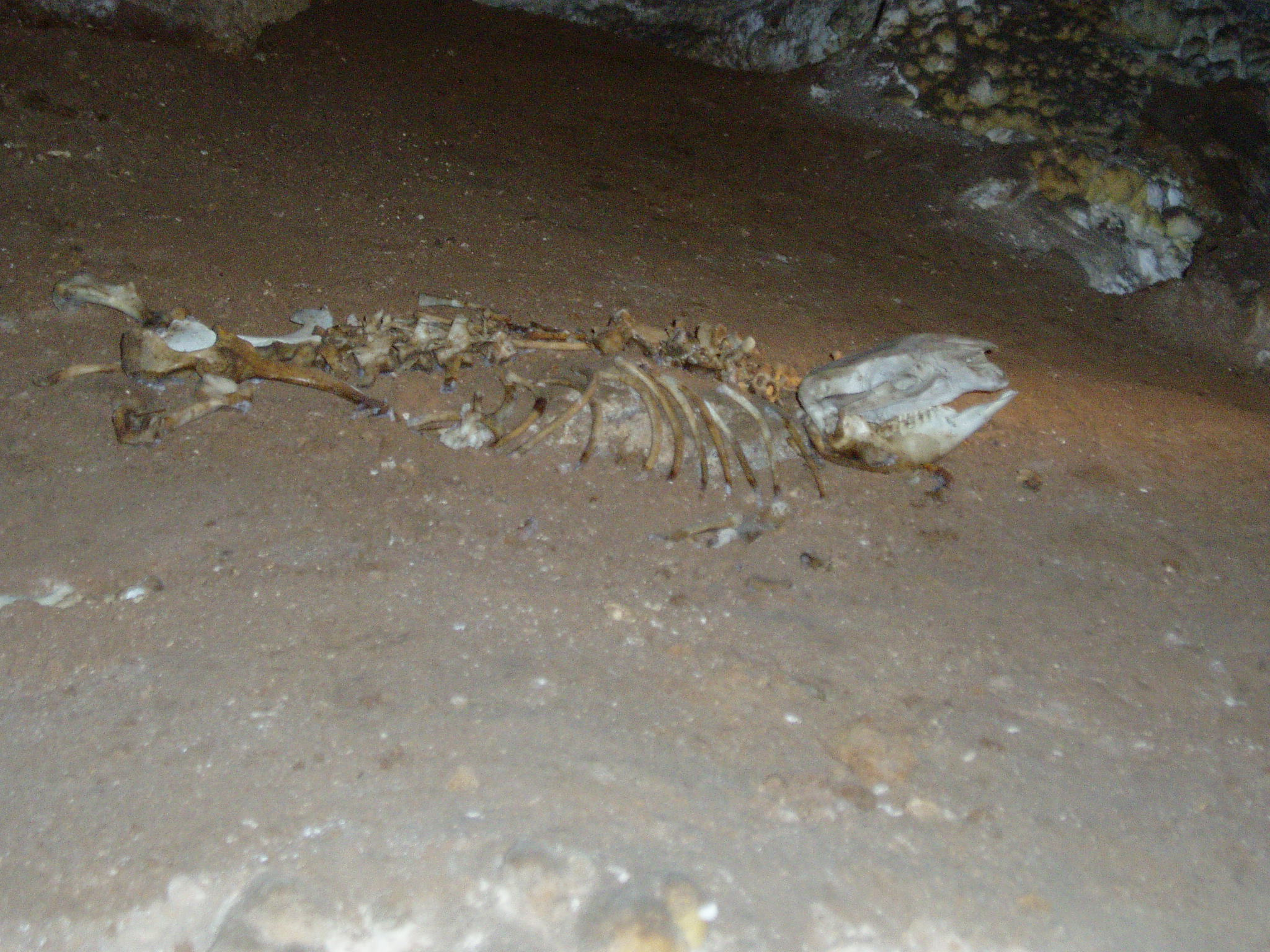
An articulated wombat skeleton in Imperial-Diamond cave (Jenolan Caves)

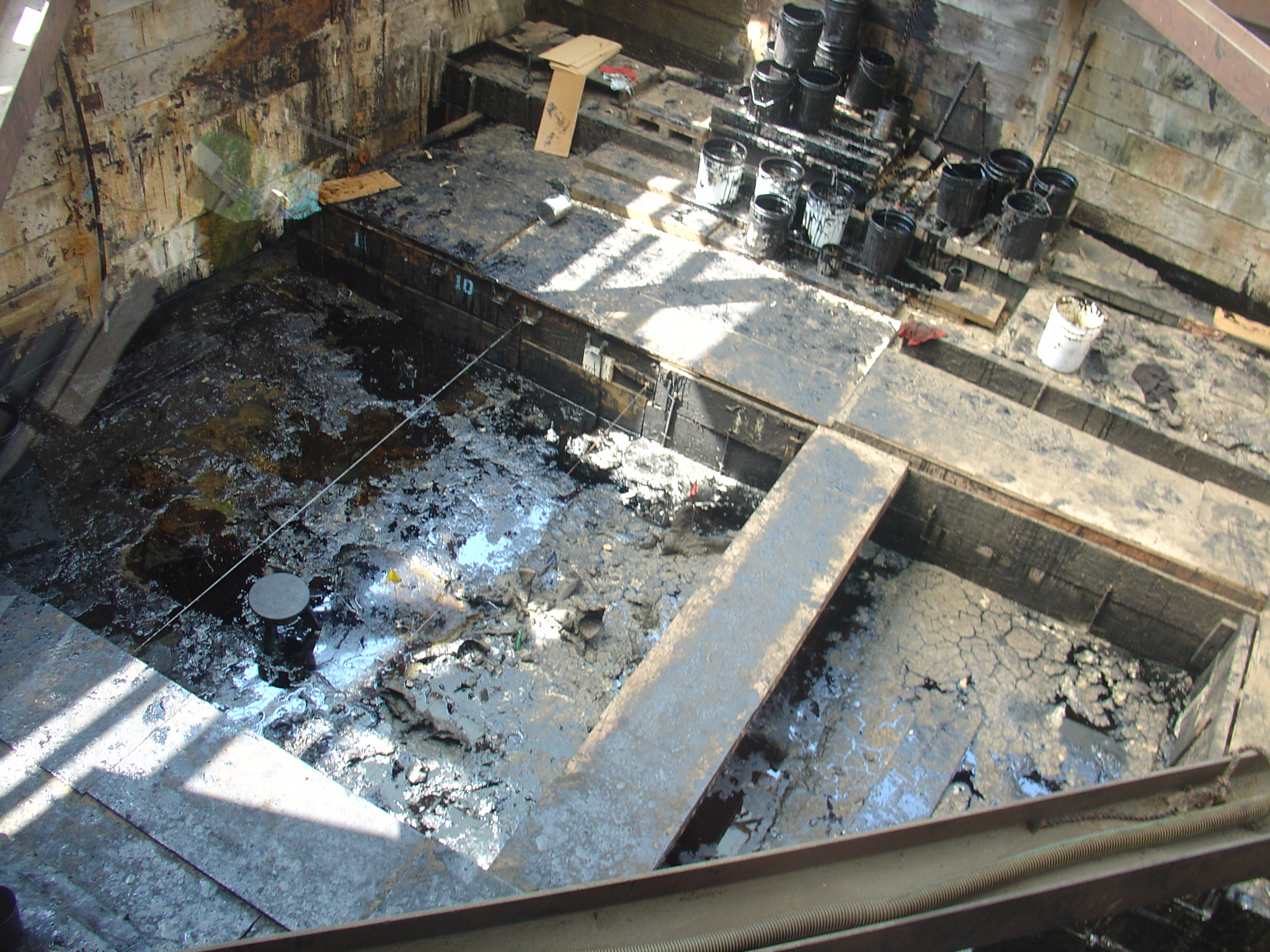
The La Brea Tar Pits represent an unusual depositional environment for their epoch (Pleistocene) and location (southern California).

Taphonomic phenomena are grouped into two phases: biostratinomy, events that occur between the death of the organism and the burial; and diagenesis, events that occur after the burial. Since Efremov's definition, taphonomy has expanded to include the fossilization of organic and inorganic materials through both cultural and environmental influences. Taphonomy is now most widely defined as the study of what happens to objects after they leave the biosphere (living contexts), enter the lithosphere (buried contexts), and are subsequently recovered and studied.

This is a multidisciplinary concept that is used in slightly different contexts across various fields of study. Fields that employ the concept of taphonomy include:

- Archaeobotany
- Archaeology
- Biology
- Forensic science
- Geoarchaeology
- Geology
- Paleoecology
- Paleontology
- Zooarchaeology

There are five main stages of taphonomy: disarticulation, dispersal, accumulation, fossilization, and mechanical alteration. The first stage, disarticulation, occurs as the organism decays and the bones are no longer held together by the flesh and tendons of the organism. Dispersal is the separation of pieces of an organism caused by natural events (i.e. floods, scavengers etc.). Accumulation occurs when there is a buildup of organic and/or inorganic materials in one location (scavengers or human behavior). When mineral-rich groundwater permeates organic materials and fills the empty spaces, a fossil is formed. The final stage of taphonomy is mechanical alteration; these are the processes that physically alter the remains (i.e. freeze-thaw, compaction, transport, burial). These stages are not only successive, they interplay. For example, chemical changes occur at every stage of the process due to the presence of bacteria. Changes begin as soon as the death of the organism: enzymes are released that destroy the organic contents of the tissues, and mineralised tissues such as bone, enamel and dentin are a mixture of organic and mineral components. Moreover, most often the organisms (vegetal or animal) are dead because a predator has killed them. Digestion modifies the composition of the flesh, as well as that of the bones.

== Research areas ==
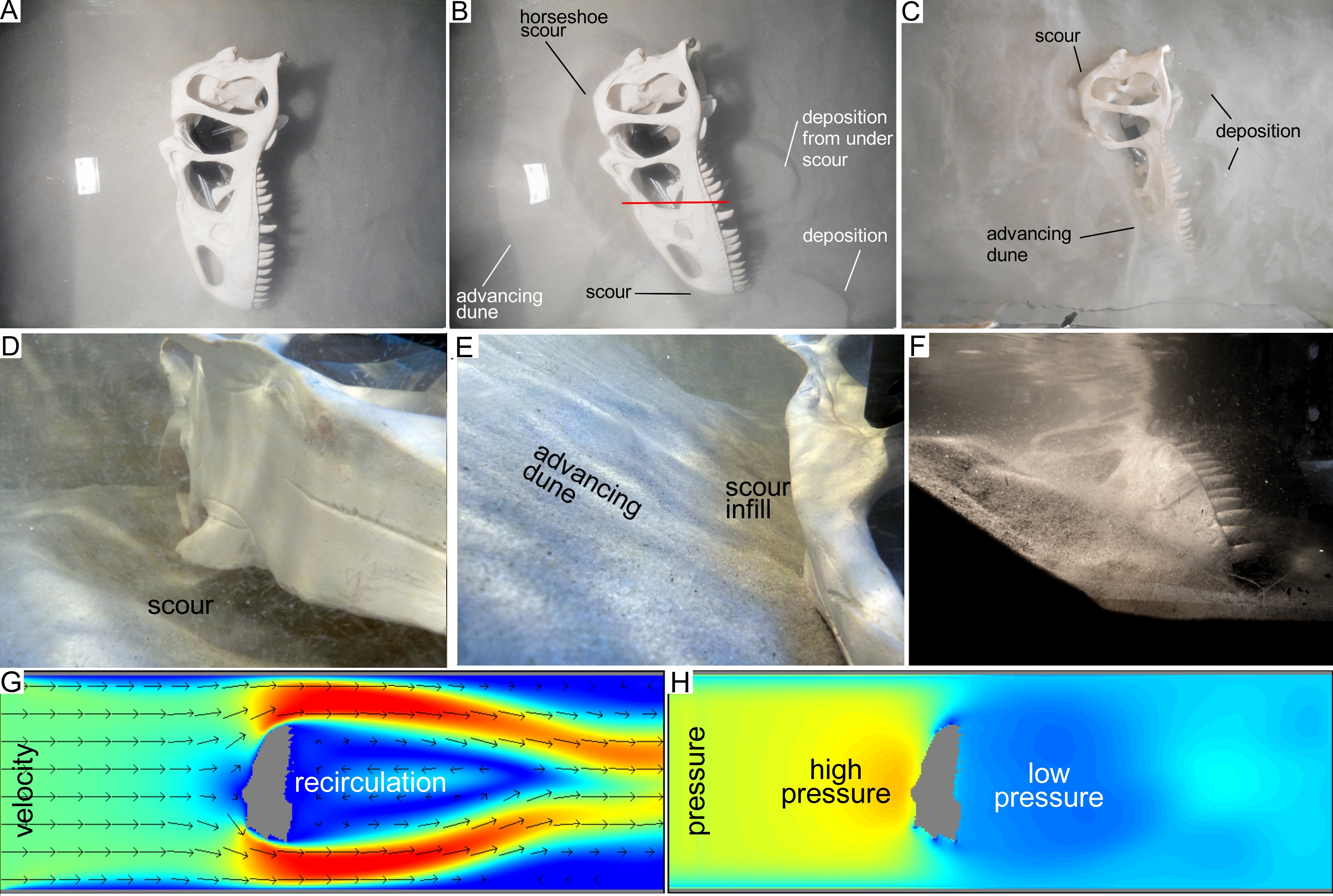
Actualistic taphonomy seeks to understand taphonomic processes through experimentation, such as the burial of bone.

Taphonomy has undergone an explosion of interest since the 1980s, with research focusing on certain areas.

- Microbial, biogeochemical, and larger-scale controls on the preservation of different tissue types; in particular, exceptional preservation in Konzervat-lagerstätten. Covered within this field is the dominance of biological versus physical agents in the destruction of remains from all major taxonomic groups (plants, invertebrates, vertebrates).
- Processes that concentrate biological remains, especially the degree to which different types of assemblages reflect the species composition and abundance of source faunas and floras.
- Actualistic taphonomy uses the present to understand past taphonomic events. This is often done through controlled experiments, such as the role microbes play in fossilization, the effects of mammalian carnivores on bone, or the burial of bone in a water flume. Computer modeling is also used to explain taphonomic events. Studies on actualistic taphonomy gave rise to the discipline conservation paleobiology.
- The spatio-temporal resolution and ecological fidelity of species assemblages, particularly the relatively minor role of out-of-habitat transport contrasted with the major effects of time-averaging. (See § Temporal resolution below.)
- The outlines of megabiases in the fossil record, including the evolution of new bauplans and behavioral capabilities, and by broad-scale changes in climate, tectonics, and geochemistry of Earth surface systems.
- The Mars Science Laboratory mission objectives evolved from assessment of ancient Mars habitability to developing predictive models on taphonomy.

=== Paleontology ===
One motivation behind taphonomy is to understand biases present in the fossil record better. Fossils are ubiquitous in sedimentary rocks, yet paleontologists cannot draw the most accurate conclusions about the lives and ecology of the fossilized organisms without knowing about the processes involved in their fossilization. For example, if a fossil assemblage contains more of one type of fossil than another, one can infer either that the organism was present in greater numbers or that its remains were more resistant to decomposition.

During the late twentieth century, taphonomic data began to be applied to other paleontological subfields such as paleobiology, paleoceanography, ichnology (the study of trace fossils) and biostratigraphy. By coming to understand the oceanographic and ethological implications of observed taphonomic patterns, palaeontologists have been able to provide new and meaningful interpretations and correlations that would have otherwise remained obscure in the fossil record. In the marine environment, taphonomy, specifically aragonite loss, poses a major challenge in reconstructing past environments from the modern, notably in settings such as carbonate platforms.

=== Forensic science ===
Forensic taphonomy is a relatively new field that has gained popularity over the past 15 years. It is a subfield of forensic anthropology focusing specifically on how taphonomic forces have altered criminal evidence.

There are two different branches of forensic taphonomy: biotaphonomy and geotaphonomy. Biotaphonomy examines the process of decomposition and/or destruction of the organism. The main factors that affect this branch are categorised into three groups: environmental factors, external variables, individual factors, factors from the organism itself (i.e. body size, age, etc.), and cultural factors, factors specific to any cultural behaviours that would affect the decomposition (burial practices). Geotaphonomy studies how the burial practices and the burial itself affect the surrounding environment. This includes soil disturbances and tool marks from digging the grave, disruption of plant growth and soil pH from the decomposing body, and the alteration of the land and water drainage from introducing an unnatural mass to the area.

This field is essential because it helps scientists use the taphonomic profile to help determine what happened to the remains at the time of death (perimortem) and after death (postmortem). This can make a huge difference when considering what can be used as evidence in a criminal investigation.

=== Archaeology ===
Taphonomy is a crucial study for archaeologists to better interpret archaeological sites. Since the archaeological record is often incomplete, taphonomy helps explain how it became incomplete. The methodology of taphonomy involves observing transformation processes to understand their impact on archaeological material and interpret patterns at real sites. This is mainly in the form of assessing how the deposition of the preserved remains of an organism (usually animal bones) has occurred to understand a deposit better.

Whether the deposition was a result of humans, animals and/or the environment is often the goal of taphonomic study. Archaeologists typically separate natural from cultural processes when identifying evidence of human interaction with faunal remains. This is done by looking at human processes preceding artifact discard in addition to processes after artifact discard. Changes preceding discard include butchering, skinning, and cooking. Understanding these processes can inform archaeologists on tool use or how an animal was processed. When the artifact is deposited, abiotic and biotic modifications occur. These can include thermal alteration, rodent disturbances, gnaw marks, and the effects of soil pH to name a few.

While taphonomic methodology can be applied and used to study a variety of materials such as buried ceramics and lithics, its primary application in archaeology involves the examination of organic residues. Interpretation of the post-mortem, pre-, and post-burial histories of faunal assemblages is critical in determining their association with hominid activity and behaviour.

For instance, to distinguish the bone assemblages that are produced by humans from those of non humans, much ethnoarchaeological observation has been done on different human groups and carnivores, to ascertain if there is anything different in the accumulation and fragmentation of bones. This study has also come in the form of excavation of animal dens and burrows to study the discarded bones and experimental breakage of bones with and without stone tools.

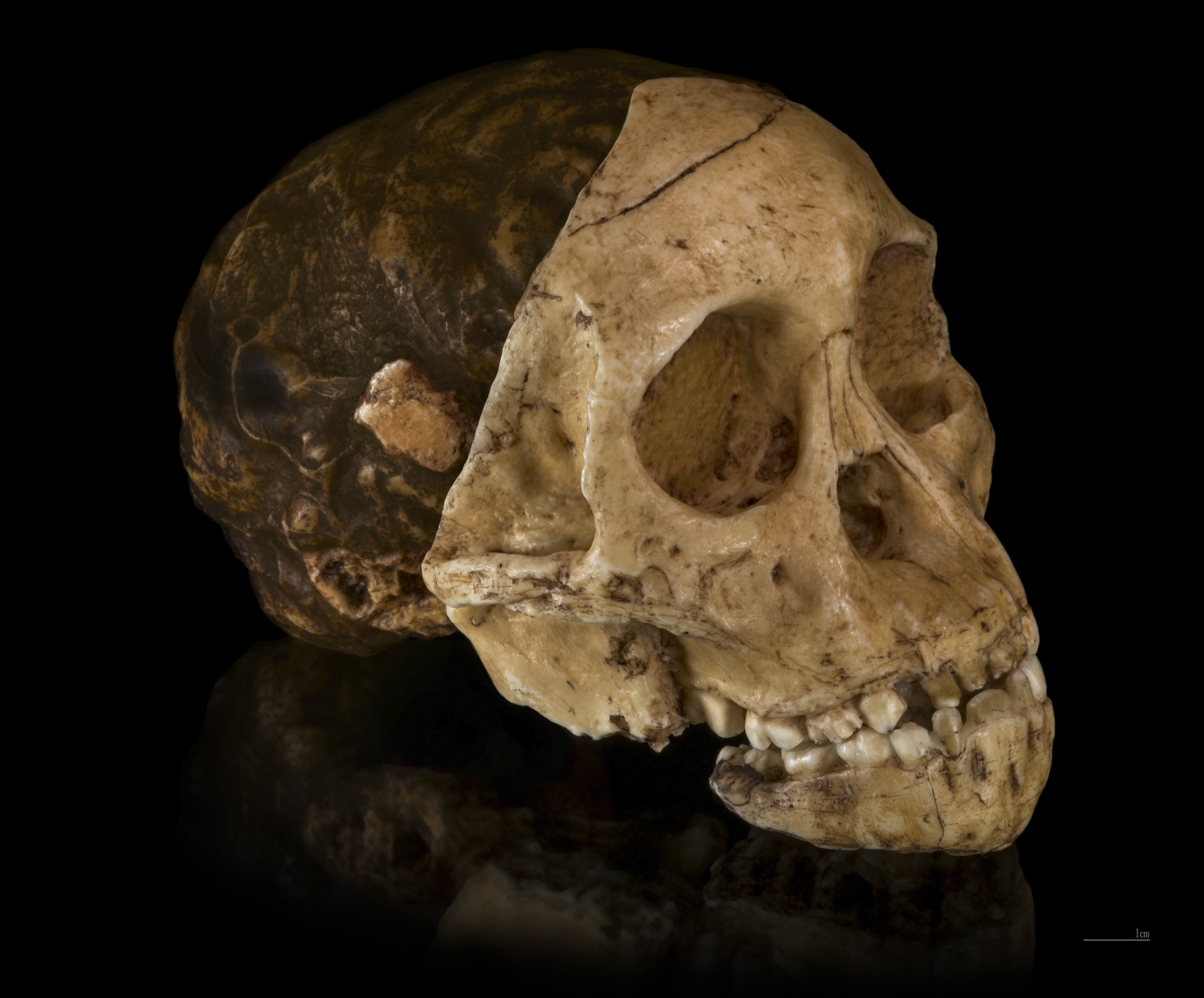
Taphonomic study of the Taung child skull claims they were likely killed by a large bird, indicated by traces of talon cuts.

Studies of this kind by C.K. Brain in South Africa have shown that bone fractures previously attributed to "killer man-apes" were in fact caused by the pressure of overlying rocks and earth in limestone caves. His research has also demonstrated that early hominins, for example australopithecines, were more likely preyed upon by carnivores rather than being hunters themselves, from cave sites such as Swartkrans in South Africa.

Outside of Africa Lewis Binford observed the effects of wolves and dogs on bones in Alaska and the American Southwest, differentiating the interference of humans and carnivores on bone remains by the number of bone splinters and the number of intact articular ends. He observed that animals gnaw and attack the articular ends first leaving mostly bone cylinders behind, therefore it can be assumed a deposit with a high number of bone cylinders and a low number of bones with articular ends intact is therefore probably the result of carnivore activity. In practice John Speth applied these criteria to the bones from the Garnsey site in New Mexico. The rarity of bone cylinders indicated that there had been minimal destruction by scavengers, and that the bone assemblage could be assumed to be wholly the result of human activity, butchering the animals for meat and marrow extraction.

One of the most important elements in this methodology is replication, to confirm the validity of results.

There are limitations to this kind of taphonomic study in archaeological deposits as any analysis has to presume that processes in the past were the same as today, e.g that living carnivores behaved in a similar way to those in prehistoric times. There are wide variations among existing species so determining the behavioural patterns of extinct species is sometimes hard to justify. Moreover, the differences between faunal assemblages of animals and humans is not always so distinct, hyenas and humans display similar patterning in breakage and form similarly shaped fragments as the ways in which a bone can break are limited. Since large bones survive better than plants this also has created a bias and inclination towards big-game hunting rather than gathering when considering prehistoric economies.

While all of archaeology studies taphonomy to some extent, certain subfields deal with it more than others. These include zooarchaeology, geoarchaeology, and paleoethnobotany.

=== Microbial mats ===
Modern experiments have been conducted on post-mortem invertebrates and vertebrates to understand how microbial mats and microbial activity influence the formation of fossils and the preservation of soft tissues. In these studies, microbial mats entomb animal carcasses in a sarcophagus of microbes—the sarcophagus entombing the animal's carcass delays decay. Entombed carcasses were observed to be more intact than non-entombed counter-parts by years at a time. Microbial mats maintained and stabilized the articulation of the joints and the skeleton of post-mortem organisms, as seen in frog carcasses for up to 1080 days after coverage by the mats. The environment within the entombed carcasses is typically described as anoxic and acidic during the initial stage of decomposition. These conditions are perpetuated by the exhaustion of oxygen by aerobic bacteria within the carcass creating an environment ideal for the preservation of soft tissues, such as muscle tissue and brain tissue. The anoxic and acidic conditions created by that mats also inhibit the process of autolysis within the carcasses delaying decay even further. Endogenous gut bacteria have also been described to aid the preservation of invertebrate soft tissue by delaying decay and stabilizing soft tissue structures. Gut bacteria form pseudomorphs replicating the form of soft tissues within the animal. These pseudomorphs are possible explanation for the increased occurrence of preserved guts impression among invertebrates. In the later stages of the prolonged decomposition of the carcasses, the environment within the sarcophagus alters to more oxic and basic conditions promoting biomineralization and the precipitation of calcium carbonate.

Microbial mats additionally play a role in the formation of molds and impressions of carcasses. These molds and impressions replicate and preserve the integument of animal carcasses. The degree to which has been demonstrated in frog skin preservation. The original morphology of the frog skin, including structures such as warts, was preserved for more than 1.5 years. The microbial mats also aided in the formation of the mineral gypsum embedded within the frog skin. The microbes that constitute the microbial mats in addition to forming a sarcophagus, secrete an exopolymeric substances (EPS) that drive biomineralization. The EPS provides a nucleated center for biomineralization. During later stages of decomposition heterotrophic microbes degrade the EPS, facilitating the release of calcium ions into the environment and creating a Ca-enriched film. The degradation of the EPS and formation of the Ca-rich film is suggested to aid in the precipitation of calcium carbonate and further the process of biomineralization.

== Taphonomic biases in the fossil record ==
Because of the very select processes that cause preservation, not all organisms have the same chance of being preserved. Any factor that affects the likelihood that an organism is preserved as a fossil is a potential source of bias. It is thus arguably the most important goal of taphonomy to identify the scope of such biases such that they can be quantified to allow correct interpretations of the relative abundances of organisms that make up a fossil biota. Some of the most common sources of bias are listed below.

=== Physical attributes of the organism itself ===
This perhaps represents the biggest source of bias in the fossil record. First and foremost, organisms that contain hard parts have a far greater chance of being represented in the fossil record than organisms consisting of soft tissue only. As a result, animals with bones or shells are overrepresented in the fossil record, and many plants are only represented by pollen or spores that have hard walls. Soft-bodied organisms may form 30% to 100% of the biota, but most fossil assemblages preserve none of this unseen diversity, which may exclude groups such as fungi and entire animal phyla from the fossil record. Many animals that moult, on the other hand, are overrepresented, as one animal may leave multiple fossils due to its discarded body parts. Among plants, wind-pollinated species produce so much more pollen than animal-pollinated species, the former being overrepresented relative to the latter.

=== Characteristics of the habitat ===
Most fossils form in conditions where material is deposited on the bottom of water bodies. Coastal areas are often prone to high rates of erosion, and rivers flowing into the sea may carry a high particulate load from inland. These sediments will eventually settle out, so organisms living in such environments have a much higher chance of being preserved as fossils after death than do those organisms living in non-depositing conditions. In continental environments, fossilization is likely in lakes and riverbeds that gradually fill in with organic and inorganic material. The organisms of such habitats are also liable to be overrepresented in the fossil record than those living far from these aquatic environments where burial by sediments is unlikely to occur.

=== Mixing of fossils from different places ===
A sedimentary deposit may have experienced a mixing of noncontemporaneous remains within single sedimentary units via physical or biological processes; i.e. a deposit could be ripped up and redeposited elsewhere, meaning that a deposit may contain a large number of fossils from another place (an allochthonous deposit, as opposed to the usual autochthonous). Thus, a question that is often asked of fossil deposits is to what extent does the fossil deposit record the true biota that originally lived there? Many fossils are obviously autochthonous, such as rooted fossils like crinoids, and many fossils are intrinsically obviously allochthonous, such as the presence of photoautotrophic plankton in a benthic deposit that must have sunk to be deposited. A fossil deposit may thus become biased towards exotic species (i.e. species not endemic to that area) when the sedimentology is dominated by gravity-driven surges, such as mudslides, or may become biased if there are very few endemic organisms to be preserved. This is a particular problem in palynology.

=== Temporal resolution ===
Because population turnover rates of individual taxa are much less than net rates of sediment accumulation, the biological remains of successive, noncontemporaneous populations of organisms may be admixed within a single bed, known as time-averaging. Because of the slow and episodic nature of the geologic record, two apparently contemporaneous fossils may have actually lived centuries, or even millennia, apart. Moreover, the degree of time-averaging in an assemblage may vary. The degree varies on many factors, such as tissue type, the habitat, the frequency of burial events and exhumation events, and the depth of bioturbation within the sedimentary column relative to net sediment accumulation rates. Like biases in spatial fidelity, there is a bias towards organisms that can survive reworking events, such as shells. An example of a more ideal deposit with respect to time-averaging bias would be a volcanic ash deposit, which captures an entire biota caught in the wrong place at the wrong time (e.g. the Silurian Herefordshire lagerstätte).

=== Gaps in time series ===
The geological record is very discontinuous, and deposition is episodic at all scales. At the largest scale, a sedimentological high-stand period may mean that no deposition may occur for millions of years and, in fact, erosion of the deposit may occur. Such a hiatus is called an unconformity. Conversely, a catastrophic event such as a mudslide may overrepresent a time period. At a shorter scale, scouring processes such as the formation of ripples and dunes and the passing of turbidity currents may cause layers to be removed. Thus the fossil record is biased towards periods of greatest sedimentation; periods of time that have less sedimentation are consequently less well represented in the fossil record.

A related problem is the slow changes that occur in the depositional environment of an area; a deposit may experience periods of poor preservation due to, for example, a lack of biomineralizing elements. This causes the taphonomic or diagenetic obliteration of fossils, producing gaps and condensation of the record.

=== Consistency in preservation over geologic time ===
Major shifts in intrinsic and extrinsic properties of organisms, including morphology and behaviour in relation to other organisms or shifts in the global environment, can cause secular or long-term cyclic changes in preservation (megabias).

=== Human biases ===
Much of the incompleteness of the fossil record is due to the fact that only a small amount of rock is ever exposed at the surface of the Earth, and not even most of that has been explored. Our fossil record relies on the small amount of exploration that has been done on this. Unfortunately, paleontologists as humans can be very biased in their methods of collection; a bias that must be identified. Potential sources of bias include,

- Search images: field experiments have shown that paleontologists working on, say fossil clams are better at collecting clams than anything else because their search image has been shaped to bias them in favour of clams.
- Relative ease of extraction: fossils that are easy to obtain (such as many phosphatic fossils that are easily extracted en masse by dissolution in acid) are overabundant in the fossil record.
- Taxonomic bias: fossils with easily discernible morphologies will be easy to distinguish as separate species, and will thus have an inflated abundance.

== Preservation of biopolymers ==
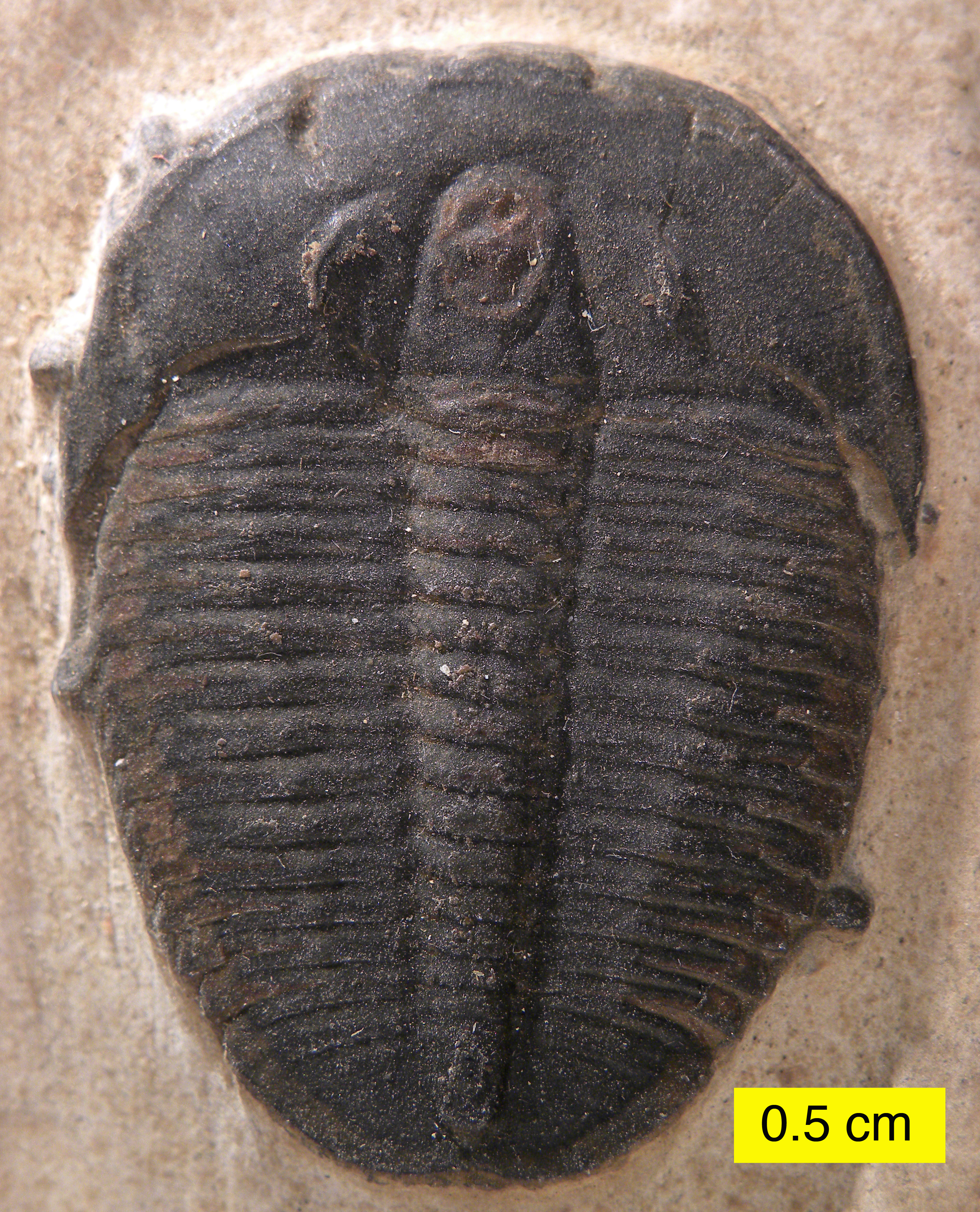
Although chitin exoskeletons of arthropods such as insects and myriapods (but not trilobites, which are mineralized with calcium carbonate, nor crustaceans, which are often mineralized with calcium phosphate) are subject to decomposition, they often maintain shape during permineralization, especially if they are already somewhat mineralized.

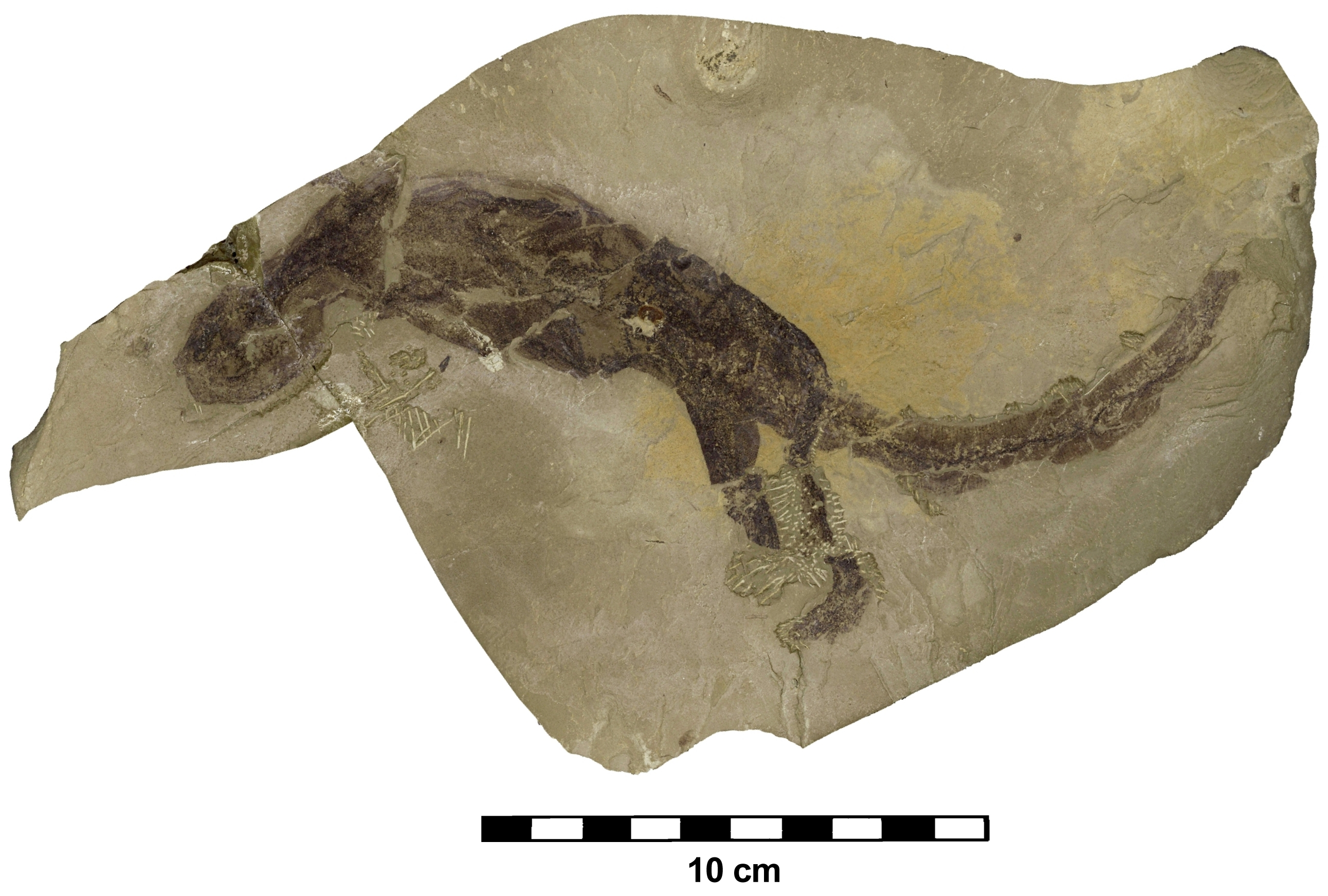
Soft-bodied preservation of a lizard, Parachute Creek Member, Green River Formation, Utah. Most of the skeleton decalcified.

The taphonomic pathways involved in relatively inert substances such as calcite (and to a lesser extent bone) are relatively obvious, as such body parts are stable and change little through time. However, the preservation of "soft tissue" is more interesting, as it requires more peculiar conditions. While usually only biomineralised material survives fossilisation, the preservation of soft tissue is not as rare as sometimes thought.

Both DNA and proteins are unstable, and rarely survive more than hundreds of thousands of years before degrading. Polysaccharides also have low preservation potential, unless they are highly cross-linked; this interconnection is most common in structural tissues, and renders them resistant to chemical decay. Such tissues include wood (lignin), spores and pollen (sporopollenin), the cuticles of plants (cutan) and animals, the cell walls of algae (algaenan), and potentially the polysaccharide layer of some lichens. This interconnectedness makes the chemicals less prone to chemical decay, and also means they are a poorer source of energy so less likely to be digested by scavenging organisms. After being subjected to heat and pressure, these cross-linked organic molecules typically "cook" and become kerogen or short (<17 C atoms) aliphatic/aromatic carbon molecules. Other factors affect the likelihood of preservation; for instance sclerotization renders the jaws of polychaetes more readily preserved than the chemically equivalent but non-sclerotized body cuticle. A peer-reviewed study in 2023 was the first to present an in-depth chemical description of how biological tissues and cells potentially preserve into the fossil record. This study generalized the chemistry underlying cell and tissue preservation to explain the phenomenon for potentially any cellular organism.

It was thought that only tough, cuticle type soft tissue could be preserved by Burgess Shale type preservation, but an increasing number of organisms are being discovered that lack such cuticle, such as the probable chordate Pikaia and the shellless Odontogriphus.

It is a common misconception that anaerobic conditions are necessary for the preservation of soft tissue; indeed much decay is mediated by sulfate reducing bacteria which can only survive in anaerobic conditions. Anoxia does, however, reduce the probability that scavengers will disturb the dead organism, and the activity of other organisms is undoubtedly one of the leading causes of soft-tissue destruction.

Plant cuticle is more prone to preservation if it contains cutan, rather than cutin.

Plants and algae produce the most preservable compounds, which are listed according to their preservation potential by Tegellaar (see reference).

== Disintegration ==
The completeness of fossils was once thought to be a proxy for the energy of the environment, with stormier waters leaving less articulated carcasses. However, the dominant force actually seems to be predation, with scavengers more likely than rough waters to break up a fresh carcass before it is buried. Trampling of a carcass by other animals also has been known to contribute to their disintegration. Sediments cover smaller fossils faster, so they are likely to be found fully articulated. However, erosion also tends to destroy smaller fossils more easily.

== Distortion ==
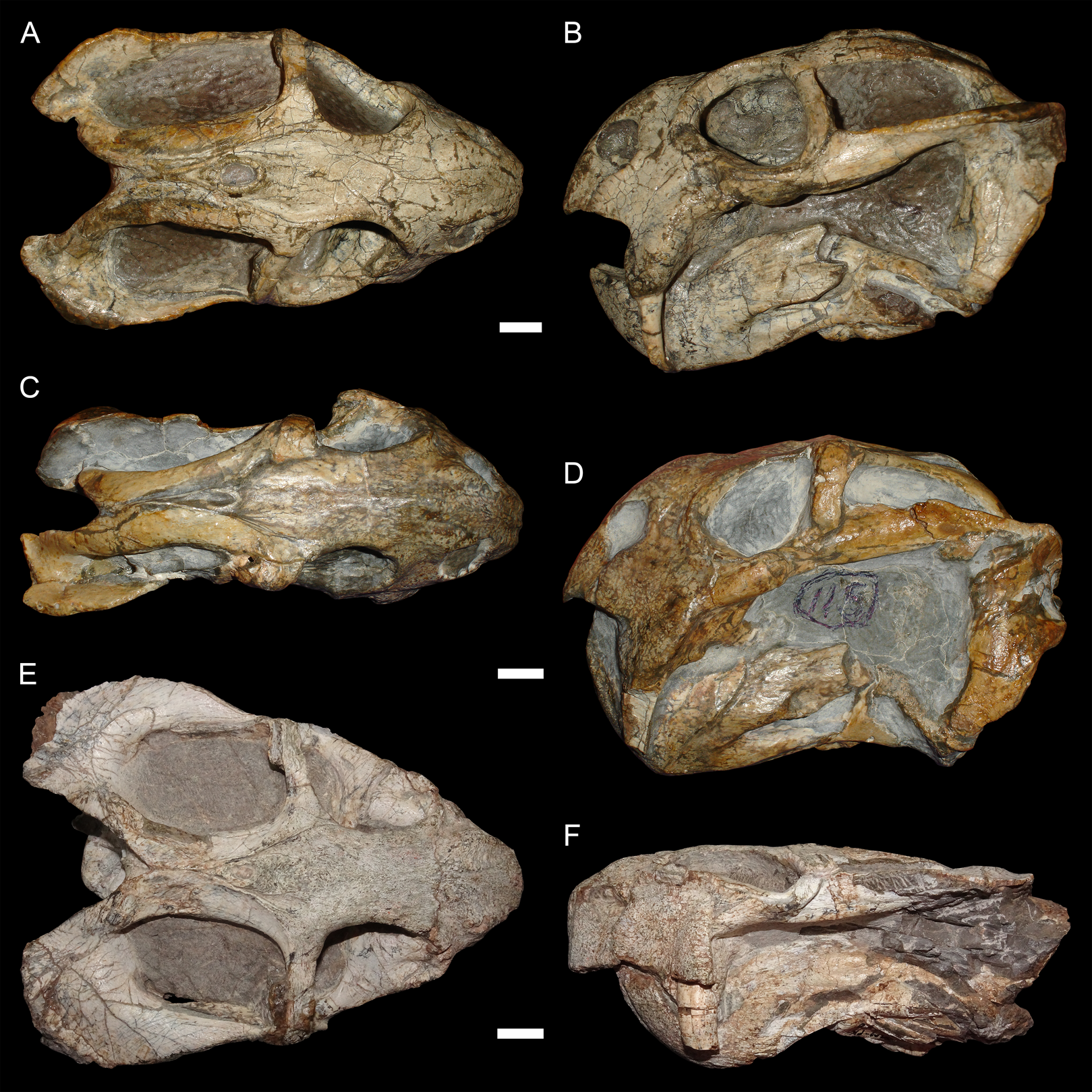
Skulls of Diictodon undistorted (top), compressed in a lateral axis (middle) and compressed on a dorsal-ventral axis (bottom)

Often fossils, particularly those of vertebrates, are distorted by the subsequent movements of the surrounding sediment, this can include compression of the fossil in a particular axis, as well as shearing.

== Significance ==
Taphonomic processes allow researchers of multiple fields to identify the past of natural and cultural objects. From the time of death or burial until excavation, taphonomy can aid in the understanding of past environments. When studying the past it is important to gain contextual information in order to have a solid understanding of the data. Often these findings can be used to better understand cultural or environmental shifts within the present day.

The term taphomorph is used to collectively describe fossil structures that represent poorly-preserved and deteriorated remains of various taxonomic groups, rather than of a single species. For example, the 579–560 million year old fossil Ediacaran assemblages from Avalonian locations in Newfoundland contain taphomorphs of a mixture of taxa which have collectively been named Ivesheadiomorphs. Originally interpreted as fossils of a single genus, Ivesheadia, they are now thought to be the deteriorated remains of various types of frondose organism. Similarly, Ediacaran fossils from England, once assigned to Blackbrookia, Pseudovendia and Shepshedia, are now all regarded as taphomorphs related to Charnia or Charniodiscus.

== Fluvial taphonomy ==
Fluvial taphonomy is concerned with the decomposition of organisms in rivers. An organism may sink or float within a river, it may also be carried by the current near the surface of the river or near its bottom. Organisms in terrestrial and fluvial environments will not undergo the same processes. A fluvial environment may be colder than a terrestrial environment. The ecosystem of live organisms that scavenge on the organism in question and the abiotic items in rivers will differ from those on land. Organisms within a river may also be physically transported by the flow of the river. The flow of the river can additionally erode the surface of the organisms found within it. The processes an organism may undergo in a fluvial environment will result in a slower rate of decomposition within a river compared to on land.

== See also ==
- Beecher's Trilobite type preservation – Replacement of soft tissues of a fossil with pyrite
- Bitter Springs type preservation – Preservation mode of microorganisms in silica
- Burgess Shale-type preservation – Shale known for exceptional preservation of mid-Cambrian organisms
- Doushantuo type preservation – Method of fossil formation
- Ediacaran type preservation – Ediacaran organisms preserved as casts on the surface of microbial mats
- Fossil – Preserved remains or traces of organisms from a past geological age
- Karen Chin – American paleontologist and taphonomist
- Lagerstätte – Sedimentary deposit with well-preserved extraordinary fossils
- Permineralization – Type of fossilization
- Petrifaction – Process of fossilization
- Pseudofossil – Inorganic objects, markings, or impressions that might be mistaken for fossils
- Trace fossil – Geological record of biological activity
