= Burgess Shale-type preservation =

Shale known for exceptional preservation of mid-Cambrian organisms

The Burgess Shale of British Columbia is famous for its exceptional preservation of mid-Cambrian organisms. Around 69 other sites have been discovered of a similar age, with soft tissues preserved in a similar, though not identical, fashion. Additional sites with a similar form of preservation are known from the Ediacaran and Ordovician periods.

These various shales are of great importance in the reconstruction of the ecosystems immediately after the Cambrian explosion. The taphonomic regime results in soft tissue being preserved, meaning that organisms without conventionally fossilized hard parts can be seen. This provides further insight into the organs of more familiar organisms such as the trilobites.

The most famous localities preserving organisms in this fashion are the Canadian Burgess Shale, the Chinese Chengjiang fauna, and the more remote Sirius Passet in north Greenland. However, a number of other localities also exist.

== Distribution ==
Burgess Shale-type biotas are found principally in the early and middle Cambrian, but the preservational mode is also present before the Cambrian (e.g. Lantian biota) and through into the Ordovician (e.g. Fezouata). It is surprisingly common during the Cambrian period; over 40 sites are known from across the globe, and soft-bodied fossils occur in abundance at nine of these.

== Preservational regime ==
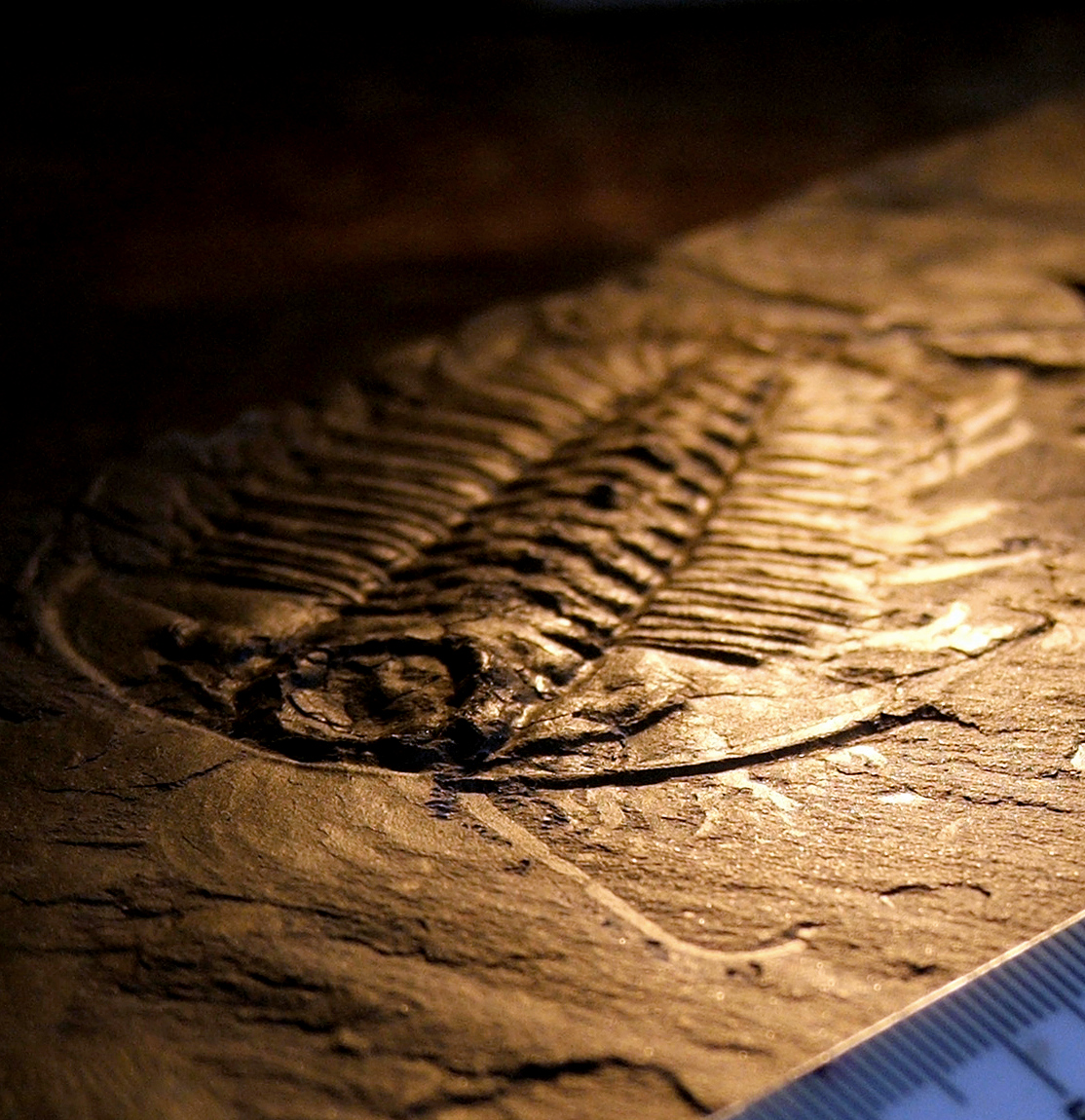
A Burgess Shale trilobite showing soft-part preservation

Burgess Shale-type deposits occur either on the continental slope or in a sedimentary basin. They are known in sediments deposited at all water depths during the Precambrian (Riphean age onwards), with a notable gap in the last 150 million years of the Proterozoic. They become increasingly restricted to deep waters in the Cambrian.

In order for soft tissue to be preserved, its volatile carbon framework must be replaced by something able to survive the rigours of time and burial.

Charles Walcott, who discovered the Burgess Shale on 30 August 1909, hypothesised that the organic material was preserved by silicification. When the shale was redescribed in the 1970s, it was possible to take a more experimental approach to determining the nature of the fossils, which turned out to be mainly composed of carbon or clay minerals. In many cases, both were present, suggesting that the original carbon was preserved, and the process of its preservation caused clay minerals to form in a predictable fashion.

When carbon is preserved it usually forms films of the highly cross-linked and essentially inert compound kerogen, with kerogen formation from organic precursors likely to happen as the host rock is exposed to high pressures. In addition, films of phyllicate (clay) minerals can grow in situ, overprinting the biological tissue. The decay process creates chemical gradients that are essential for mineral growth to continue long enough for the tissue to be preserved. Oxygen in the sediment allows decomposition to occur at a much faster rate, which decreases the quality of the preservation, but does not prevent it entirely. The conventional, exceptionally preserved fossils of the Burgess Shale are supplemented by the shells of organisms which lived on, and burrowed into, the sediment before the exceptional preservation pathway was complete. The organisms' presence shows that oxygen was present, but at worst this "paused" the mineralisation process. It seems that whilst anoxia improves Burgess Shale-type preservation, it is not essential to the process.

In addition to the organic films, parts of many Burgess Shale creatures are preserved by phosphatisation: The mid-gut glands of arthropods often host a concentration of high reactivity phosphates, making them the first structures to be preserved; they may be preserved in three dimensions, having been solidified before they could be flattened. As these structures are unique to predatory and scavenging arthropods, this form of preservation is limited to—and diagnostic of—such creatures.

Another type of mineralisation that is common in Chengjiang deposits is pyritisation; pyrite is deposited as a result of the activity of sulfate-reducing bacteria organisms soon after their burial.

With the exception of phosphatic preservation, individual cells are never preserved; only structures such as chitinous exoskeleton, or scales and jaws, survive. This poses little problem for most invertebrate groups, whose outline is defined by a resistant exoskeleton. Pyrite and phosphate are exceptional additions to Burgess Shale-type preservation, and are certainly not found in all localities. The defining preservation process is that which preserves organic film plus phyllosilicate. For this preservation to occur, the organisms must be protected from decay. There are a few ways that this can happen; for instance they can be chemically protected within the sediment by phyllosilicates or biopolymers, which inhibit the action of decay related enzymes. Alternatively the sediment could be "sealed" soon after the organisms were buried within it, with a reduction in porosity preventing oxygen from reaching the organic material.

== What is preserved ==
=== Carbon ===
The fossils usually comprise a reflective film; when the part bears an opaque, silvery film composed of organic carbon (kerogen), the counterpart's film is blue, less reflective, and more translucent. A carbon film seems to be common to all BST deposits, although the carbon may 'evaporate' as rocks are heated, potentially to be replaced with other minerals.

=== Phyllosilicates ===
Butterfield sees carbonaceous compressions as the main pathway of Burgess Shale-type preservation, but an alternative has been proposed. The fossils actually comprise aluminosilicate films (except for some localized carbonaceous regions, such as the sclerites of Wiwaxia), and Towe, followed by others, suggested that these may represent the mechanism of exceptional preservation. Orr et al. emphasize the importance of clay minerals, whose composition seems to reflect the chemistry of the underlying, decaying, tissue.

It seems that the original carbon film formed a template on which aluminosilicates precipitated.

Different phyllosilicates are associated with different anatomical regions. This seems to be a result of when they formed. Phyllosilicates primarily form by filling voids. Voids formed in the fossils as the carbon films were heated and released volatile components. Different types of kerogen—reflecting different initial conditions—mature (i.e. volatilize) at different temperatures and pressures. The first kerogens to mature are those that replace labile tissue such as guts and organs; cuticular regions produce more robust kerogens that mature later. Kaolinite (rich in Al/Si, low in Mg) is the first phyllosilicate to form, once the rock is metamorphosed to the oil window, and thus replicates the most labile regions of the fossil. Once the rock is heated and compressed further, to the gas window, illite (rich in K/Al) and chlorite (rich in Fe/Mg) start to form; once all the available K is used up, no further illite forms, so the last tissues to mature are replicated exclusively in chlorite. The precise mineral formation depends on the porewater (and thus rock) chemistry; the thickness of the films increases as metamorphism continues; and the minerals align with the prevailing strain. They are not present in comparable deposits with very little metamorphism.

Calcium carbonate was originally present in the carapaces of trilobites, and may have crystallized early in diagenesis in (for example) the guts of Burgessia. It may also have filled late-stage veins in the rock. The carbonate was apparently leached away and the resultant voids filled with phyllosilicates.

=== Pyrite ===
Pyrite takes the place of phyllosilicates in some BST deposits. Labile tissues are associated with framboids, as they produced many nucleation sites due to the rapid production of sulfides (perhaps by sulfur-reducing bacteria); recalcitrant tissues are associated with euhedra. It's not entirely clear whether pyrite is involved in the preservation of the anatomy, or whether they simply replace carbon films later in diagenesis (in the same fashion as phyllosilicates).

=== Other preservational pathways ===
Some specimens bear a dark stain representing decay fluids injected into the surrounding wet sediment.

Muscle can in very rare cases survive by silicification, or by authigenic mineralization by any of a range of other minerals. However, predominately soft tissues, such as muscles and gonads, are never preserved by the carbonaceous-compression preservational pathway. Phosphatisation and the presence of other enzymes means that guts and mid-gut glands are often preserved. Some bilaterally-symmetrical entities in the heads of arthropods have been interpreted as representing nervous tissue—a brain.

Otherwise it is cuticle that is most consistently present. Butterfield argues that only recalcitrant tissue (e.g. cuticle) can be preserved as a carbonaceous compression, and cellular material has no preservation potential. However, Conway Morris and others disagree, and non-cuticular organs and organisms have been described, including the setae of brachiopods and the jellyfish ctenophores (comb jellies).

The mineralogy and geochemistry of the Burgess Shale is completely typical of any other Palaeozoic mudstone.

=== Variation between BST sites ===
Preservation in the Chengjiang is similar, but with the addition of a pyritization mechanism, which seems to be the primary way in which soft tissue was preserved.

Different BST deposits display different taphonomic potentials; in particular, the propensity of entirely soft-bodied organisms (i.e. those without shells or tough carapaces) to preserve is highest in the Burgess Shale, lower in the Chengjiang, and lower still in other sites.

== How it is preserved ==
Normally, organic carbon is decayed before it is rotted. Anoxia can prevent decay, but the prevalence of bioturbation associated with body fossils indicates that many BS sites were oxygenated when the fossils were deposited. It seems that the reduced permeability associated with the clay particles that make up the sediment restricted oxygen flow; furthermore, some beds may have been 'sealed' by the deposition of a carbonate cement. The chemistry of the clay particles that buried the organisms seems to have played an important role in preservation.

The carbon isn't preserved in its original state, which is often chitin or collagen. Rather, it is kerogenized. This process seems to involve the incorporation of aliphatic lipid molecules.

== Elemental distribution ==
Elemental distribution is unevenly spread through the organic remains, allowing the original nature of the remnant film to be predicted. For example:

- Silicon is more abundant in cuticular material
- Aluminium and potassium are higher in the eyes
- Calcium and phosphorus are generally associated with mid-gut glands, and aluminium is higher in the alimentary canal.
- Areas in which silicon is depleted, and aluminium and potassium concentrations elevated, have been interpreted as originally fluid-filled cavities.

Because the fossiliferous layer is so thin, it is effectively transparent to electrons at high-accelerating (>15V) voltages.

== Sedimentary setting ==
In the Wheeler Formation, lagerstätte occur predictably at periodic sea-level high-stands. They formed on an oxygenated sea floor, and are associated with mud-slides or turbidity current events.

=== Brine seeps ===
One hypothesis for exceptional preservation is that brine seeps—inputs of water with a high ion content, probably associated with fluid flow along faults—altered the sedimentary environment. They would enrich the area with nutrients, allowing life to prosper; the high salinity of the sea floor would deter burrowing and scavenging; and the unusual cocktail of chemicals may have enhanced preservation.

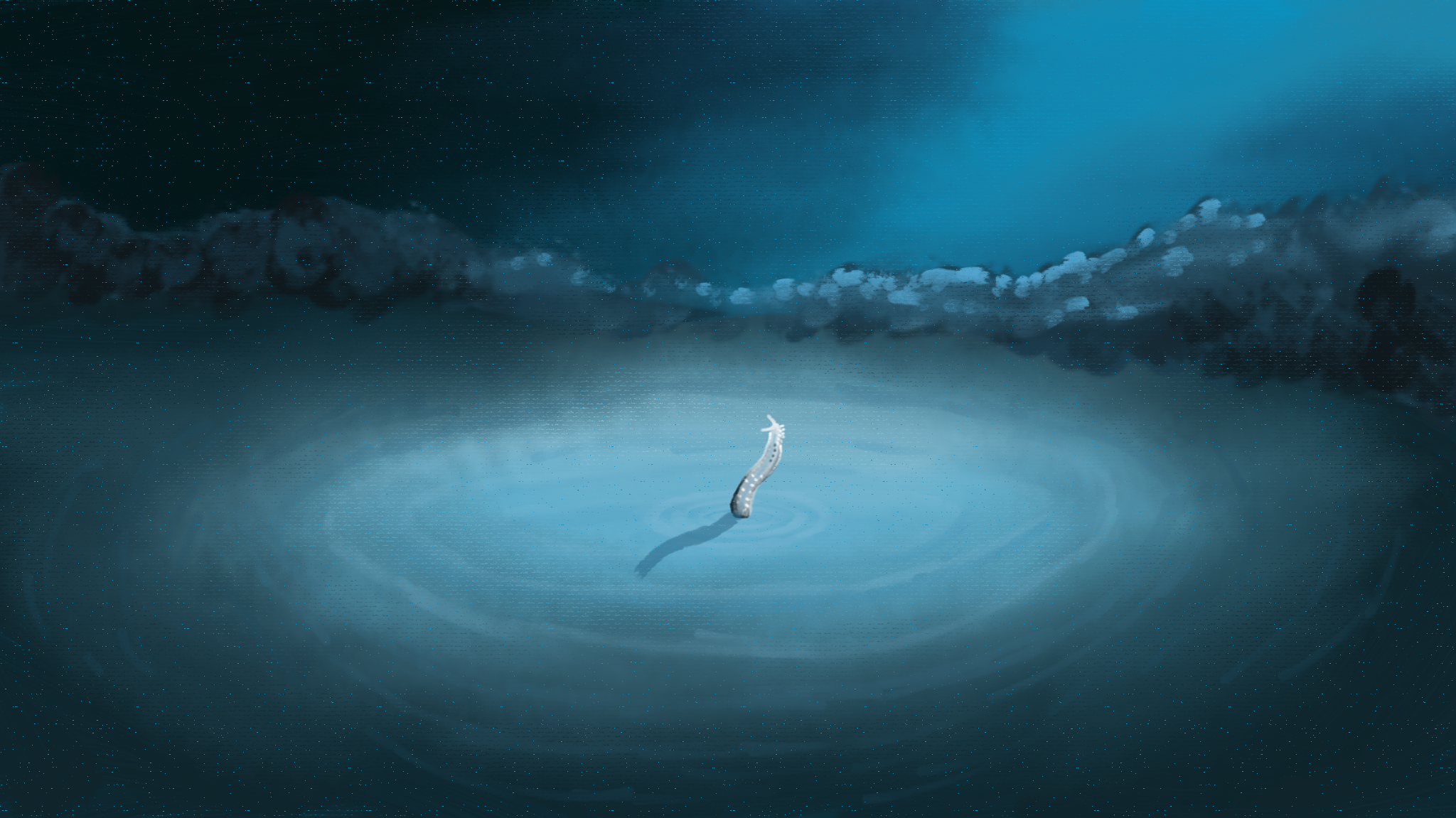
Pikaia gracilens trying to escape a brine seep at the bottom of the Cathedral Escarpment

== Before burial ==
The majority of the decay process occurred before the organisms were buried.

While the Chengjiang fauna underwent a similar preservational pathway to the Burgess Shale, the majority of organisms there are fossilised on their flattest side, suggesting that they were swept to their final resting place by turbidity currents. The location at which an organism ultimately comes to rest may depend on how readily it floats, a function of its size and density. Organisms are much more randomly arranged in the Burgess Shale itself.

Turbidity currents have also been posited as the depositional system for the Burgess Shale, but mud-silt flows seem more consistent with the available evidence. Such "slurry flows" were somewhere between a turbidity current and a debris flow. Any such flows must have enveloped free-swimming as well as bottom-dwelling organisms. In either case, additional processes must have been responsible for the exceptional preservation. One possibility is that the absence of bioturbation permitted the fossilisation, but some Burgess Shale fossils contain internal burrows, so that can't be the whole story. It is possible that certain clay minerals played a role in this process by inhibiting bacterial decay. Alternatively, reduced sediment permeability (a result of lower bioturbation rates and abundant clays) may have played a role by limiting the diffusion of oxygen.

== During burial ==
The mineralisation process began to affect the organisms soon after they had been buried. Organisms' cells rapidly decayed and collapsed, meaning that a flattened two-dimensional outline of the three-dimensional organisms is all that is preserved. Pyrite began to precipitate from seawater trapped within the sediment forming lenses of framboidal (raspberry-shaped under magnification) crystals.

== Post burial ==
Organisms may have been shielded from oxygen in the ocean by a microbial mat, which could have formed an impermeable layer between the sediment and the oxic water column. There is no evidence for these mats in the higher stratigraphic units of the Burgess Shale Formation, so they cannot be the whole story. However, cyanobacteria do appear to be associated with the preservation of the Emu Bay Shale, which was deposited beneath an oxygen-rich water column; by growing over carcasses, microbial mats held their soft tissue in place and allowed its preservation. It is possible that the sediments were not always anoxic, but that burrowing was prevented in oxic intervals by a high deposition rate, with new material provided faster than burrowers could keep up with. Indeed, a growing body of research indicates that sediment oxygenation is not related to preservation quality; the Burgess Shale itself appears to have been consistently oxic and trace fossils are sometimes found within body fossils.

Because of the great age of Cambrian sediments, most localities displaying Burgess Shale-type preservation have been affected by some form of degradation in the following 500+ million years. For instance, the Burgess Shale itself endured cooking at greenschist-level temperatures and pressures (250–300 °C, ~10 km depth/ 482-572 F, ~6.2 miles), while the Chengjiang rocks have been deeply affected by weathering. The Burgess Shale has been vertically compressed by at least a factor of eight.

== Closing the taphonomic window ==
Burgess Shale-type preservation is known from the "pre-snowball" earth, and from the early to middle Cambrian; reports during the interlying Ediacaran period are rare, although such deposits are now being found. Burgess Shale-type Konzervat-lagerstätten are statistically overabundant during the Cambrian compared to later time periods, which represents a global megabias. The mode of preservation is more abundant before the Cambrian substrate revolution, a development in which burrowing organisms established a foothold, permanently changing the nature of the sediment in a fashion that made soft-part preservation almost impossible. Consequently, the quantity of post-Cambrian Burgess Shale-type assemblages is very low. Although burrowing reduced the number of environments that could support Burgess Shale-type deposits, it alone cannot explain their demise, and changing ocean chemistry—in particular the oxygenation of ocean sediments—also contributed to the disappearance of Burgess Shale-type preservation. The number of pre-Cambrian assemblages is limited primarily by the rarity of soft-bodied organisms large enough to be preserved; however, as more and more Ediacaran sediments are examined, Burgess Shale-type preservation is becoming increasingly well known in this time period.

While the post-revolution world was full of scavenging and predatory organisms, the contribution of direct consumption of carcasses to the rarity of post-Cambrian Burgess Shale-type lagerstätten was relatively minor, compared to the changes brought about in sediments' chemistry, porosity, and microbiology, which made it difficult for the chemical gradients necessary for soft-tissue mineralisation to develop. Just like microbial mats, environments which could produce this mode of fossilisation became increasingly restricted to harsher and deeper areas, where burrowers could not establish a foothold; as time progressed, the extent of burrowing increased sufficiently to effectively make this mode of preservation impossible.

However, Burgess Shale-type biotas do in fact exist after the Cambrian (albeit somewhat more rarely). Other factors may have contributed to the closure of the window at the end of the Amgan (middle Mid-Cambrian), with many factors changing around this time. A transition from an icehouse to a greenhouse world has been associated with an increase in storm intensity, which may have hindered exceptional preservation. Other environmental factors change around this time: Phosphatic units disappear, and there is a stem change in organisms' shell thickness.

== Faunas ==
The mode of preservation preserves a number of different faunas; most famously, the Cambrian "Burgess Shale-type fauna" of the Burgess Shale itself, Chengjiang, Sirius Passet, and Weeks, Wheeler, and Marjum formations (all three in western Utah, U.S.A.). However, different faunal assemblages are also preserved, such as the microfossils of Riphean (Tonian-Cryogenian age) lagerstätten.
