= 1978 Australia Day Honours =

The 1978 Australia Day Honours were announced on 26 January 1978 by the Governor General of Australia, Sir Zelman Cowen.

The Australia Day Honours are the first of the two major annual honours lists, announced on Australia Day (26 January), with the other being the Queen's Birthday Honours which are announced on the second Monday in June.

== Order of Australia ==
=== Knight (AK) ===
Recipient	Citation	Notes
Emeritus Professor Sir Frank Macfarlane Burnet OM, KBE	For extraordinary and meritorious service to medicine and to science particularly in the fields of microbiology and immunology.	

=== Companion (AC) ===
Recipient	Citation	Notes
Emeritus Professor John Grenfell Crawford CBE	For eminent and meritorious public service and service to commerce, industry, trade, agriculture, learning and international relations.	
Emeritus Professor Percy Herbert Partridge	For eminent and meritorious service to education and educational research, particularly in the field of Social Sciences.	
Sir James Plimsoll CBE	For eminent and meritorious public service, particularly as a distinguished diplomatic representative of Australia.	

=== Officer (AO) ===
==== General Division ====
Recipient	Citation	Notes
John Joseph Ahern	For distinguished service to the community and to industry and commerce.	
Richard David Baker	For distinguished service to the community and to the dairying industry.	
Harold Brennan	For distinguished public service and for service to the people of the Northern Territory, particularly as a member of the Northern Territory Legislative Council.	
Sidney William Caffin OBE	For distinguished public service particularly as Commonwealth Actuary.	
Douglas Alfred Cashion	For distinguished service to Tasmania as a Minister of the Crown.	
Professor Raymond John Chambers	For distinguished service to commerce and to education, particularly in the field of accounting and business management.	
James Arthur Davidson	For distinguished service to the industrial gas industry and to the Government.	
Bruce Hugh Garnsey MBE	For distinguished service to the Scout Association of Australia and to world scouting.	
Frederick John Lehany	For distinguished service to science and to industry, particularly in the field of measurement and standards.	
Professor Gordon Lee McClymont	For distinguished service to veterinary science and agricultural research.	
Hal Missingham	For distinguished service to art, particularly as former Director of the Art Gallery of New South Wales.	
Michael Vincent Tracey	For distinguished service to science and to scientific research.	

==== Military Division ====
Branch	Recipient	Citation	Notes
Navy	Rear Admiral Brian Stewart Murray RAN	For distinguished service to the Royal Australian Navy	
Army	Major-General Colin Marshall Gurner CBE, OStJ, ED	For distinguished service to the medical branch of the Defence Force.	
Army	Brigadier Kevin William Latchford	For distinguished service to the Army.	
Army	Major-General Gordon Lindsay Maitland OBE, ED	For distinguished service to the Army Reserve.	
Air Force	Air Vice-Marshal Sydney Robert White	For distinguished service to the Royal Australian Air Force.	

=== Member (AM) ===
==== General Division ====
Recipient	Citation	Notes
Charles Gordon Lawrence Agius	For services to Aboriginal Welfare.	
Dr John Finch Akeroyd MBE, ED	For services to Art and to the community.	
Albert John Atkinson	For services to the community, particularly to youth and the aged.	
Nancy Lyall Bradrock	For services to dentistry and to the Dental Assistants' Association of Australia.	
Margaret Ellen Beard	For services to the nursing profession	
Gweneth Victoria Benzie	For services to the sport of Women's Netball as a player, umpire and administrator.	
Beryl Beatrice Bonfield	For services to the nursing profession and to the community.	
Right Reverend Monsignor James Edward Bourke	For services to religion and to education.	
Dr Ronald Kentish Browne	For services to education, and educational research.	
Eustace Gamaliel Butler	For services to law and to the community.	
Betty Davis	For services to education.	
Dr William Andrew Dibden	For services to mental health.	
Dr Harold Griffiths Dicks	For services to medicine and to the Royal Flying Doctor's Service.	
Reverend Father Richard Docherty	For services to religion and to Aboriginal welfare.	
Linley George	For services to ballet.	
Dr Lachlan Neil Gollan	For services to medicine and to the community.	
James Boyce Graham	For services to industry and to Government.	
Leslie Somerville Richard Graham	For services to the community, to sport and to the retail motor industry.	
Richard Martin Green	For services to local government and to the community.	
The Reverend William Courtenay Saunders Johnson	For services to religion and to the community.	
Ronald George Kelly	For public service, particularly as Deputy Chairman of the Repatriation Commission.	
Thomas Fulton Coleman Lawrence	For public service and for services to science and engineering.	
Brigadier Donald MacDonald	For services to land surveying	
John Alfred Masling	For services to industry and to commuter aviation.	
Ian Balfour McBryde	For services to scouting.	
Kevin William Michaelis	For services to the community, particularly in the provision of welfare services.	
Alfred Victor Murrell	For services to banking and to Government.	
James Douglas Patterson	For public service and for services to ex-servicemen and women.	
Alfred Lionel Rose OBE, ED	For public service and for services to primary industry and to the community.	
Charles Washington Rosewarne	For community service, particularly in the organisation and training of Emergency Fire Services.	
Dr William Fulton Salter	For public service in the field of mental health.	
James Ernest Shannon	For services to trade unionism.	
James Arthur Smithson	For services to industry and to technical education.	
Elsie Southerden	For services to the mentally handicapped.	
William Ian Stewart	For services to industry to the Standards Associations of Australia and in the field of metric conversion.	
John Noble Walker OBE	For services to manufacturing industry.	
William Herbert John Walker	For services to the sport of Australian Football.	
Kenneth Douglas Williams	For services to industry.	

==== Military Division ====
Branch	Recipient	Citation	Notes
Navy	Commodore Thomas Reid Fisher RAN	For exceptional service as Deputy Chief of Naval Material.	
Navy	Captain James Aloysius O'Farrell RAN	For exceptional performance of duty with the Royal Australian Navy.	
Army	Lieutenant Colonel Brian Michael Dwyer ED, RAAMC	For dedicated service to medical units of the Army Reserve.	
Army	Lieutenant Colonel Russell James Bielenbero RAE	For outstanding performance of duties.	
Army	Lieutenant Colonel Bernard Robert Sullivan RAAMC	For exceptional service regarding the introduction of the Leopard tank.	
Army	Lieutenant Colonel Norman Beresford Lovett ED, RAE	For dedicated service to the Army Reserve.	
Army	Lieutenant Colonel Ivan Edward Scholes RAAMC	For outstanding contribution to the development of Army Health Services.	
Army	Colonel John Erskine Faulks	For exceptional and dedicated service to the Army.	
Air Force	Chaplain John Stoddard Elliott	For dedicated service to the welfare of members of the Royal Australian Air Force.	
Air Force	Wing Commander Hedley Robert Thomas	For exceptional service as Commanding Officer of the Australian Air Force Contingent, United Nations Emergency Force.	
Air Force	Wing Commander William Graeme Rowley	For exceptional service as Commanding Officer of No. 34 V.I.P. Transport Squadron.	
Air Force	Wing Commander Graham Albert Perske	For exceptional service as Commanding Officer of No. 11 Squadron, Edinburgh.	

=== Medal (OAM) ===
==== General Division ====
Recipient	Citation	Notes
Stewart Lindsay Badcock JP	For public service with the South Australian Correctional Services Department.	
John Hugh Bennett	For service to Aboriginal Welfare.	
Valmai Therese Bennett	For public service with the Joint House Department of the Commonwealth Parliament.	
Elva Mabel Bloomfield	For service to women's sport.	
Anna Rosa Boffa	For public service with the Australian Embassy, Rome.	
Val Bryant (Carroll)	For service to Aboriginal Welfare.	
Aubrey Clement Burns	For service to the community and to ex-servicemen.	
Jeffrey Albert Cousens	For service to the community and to the disabled.	
Arthur Cys JP	For service to the community and to the Justices Association of South Australia.	
Barbara Louise Davis	For service to the community and to the Good Neighbour Council of Tasmania.	
Esme Dobson	For service to the community and to the Calisthenic Association of South Australia.	
Joseph Cribbin Fagan	For service to local government and to the community.	
Councillor David Charles Ferme	For service to local government.	
Doris Marjorie Ford	For service to the community, particularly with the Red Cross Society, the National Council of Women, and the Catholic Women's League in the Northern Territory.	
Lester Thomas William Frew	For service to the Naval Association of Australia, to Naval servicemen and to members of the Merchant Navy.	
Ruth Gilmour	For service to the community.	
Harold Goldsworthy	For service to local government and to the community.	
Gilbert Frederick Grant JP	For service to the Surf Live Saving Movement.	
Lancelot Arthur Hardy	For service to music, particularly as Organist and Master of Choristers at St Paul's Cathedral, Melbourne	
James Hoare	For service to local government and to the community.	
Hector Hutchins	For service to Band music.	
Percy Clifton Jacques	For service to local government and to the community.	
Evan John Jenkins JP	For service to local government and to the community.	
Mary MacKinnon Keach	For service to the community.	
Beryl Lipman	For service to the community, in particular to the Adelaide Children's Hospital.	
Dena Murphy	For service to the community, particularly as Postmistress at Speed, Victoria.	
Alice Mead Musgrave	For service to the community and to Legacy.	
Natalie Mary Paton	For service to the Nursing Mothers' Association of Australia.	
Kenneth Albert Rawson DFC and Bar	For service to the electrical industry and to the community.	
George Harold Russell	For service to the community in the north-western district of Tasmania.	
Maxwell Sharrad	For service to the community.	
Clarence George Skews	For service to the community, particularly with the TOC 'H' organisation.	
Gladys Viola Smith	For service to local government and to the community.	
Nicholas Stephens	For public service with the Australian Embassy, Athens.	
Godfrey Wignall	For service to trade unionism.	
Percy Cecil Simpson Winter	For public service and for service to the community.	
John Stanley Womersley	For service to the sport of Archery.	
Walter Edgar Wotzke	For service to Art and to the community.	

==== Military Division ====
Branch	Recipient	Citation	Notes
Navy	Warrant Officer Ronald John Ashton	For exceptional performance of duty requiring technical competence.	
Navy	Warrant Officer William James Richards	For exceptional service to the Naval Dental Branch.	
Navy	Chief Petty Officer Richard Vincent Egan	For outstanding service to the Naval Victualling Branch and to Naval Cadets.	
Army	Warrant Officer Class One John Stewart Allan RA Inf	For outstanding service as REgimental Sergeant Major of the First Recruit Training Battalion.	
Army	Warrant Officer Class Two Peter John Amos AACC	For outstanding performance as Unit Caterer.	
Army	Warrant Officer Class One Elma Gladys Phelps	For outstanding performance and dedication in instructional and administrative appointments.	
Army	Warrant Officer Class One Rex Peter Taylor RAA	For outstanding performance as a Regimental Sergeant Major.	
Army	Warrant Officer Class Two Dennis Zalundardo RA Inf	For leadership and devotion to duty with the Citizen Forces.	
Army	Warrant Officer Class Two Paul Robert Jeffrey RAAC	For dedication and loyalty in administrative and quartermaster postings.	
Air Force	Warrant Officer Neil Edwin Bettins	For meritorious service in maintenance of aircraft.	
Air Force	Warrant Officer Peter Beresford Jay	For outstanding and loyalty in the catering field.	
Air Force	Warrant Officer Edward Plant	For outstanding service in the radio and radar fields.	
