= Megabias =

Large-scale pattern in the quality of the fossil record

A megabias, or a taphonomic megabias, is a large-scale pattern in the quality of the fossil record that affects paleobiologic analysis at provincial to global levels and at timescales usually exceeding ten million years. It can result from major shifts in intrinsic and extrinsic properties of organisms, including morphology and behaviour in relation to other organisms, or shifts in the global environment, which can cause secular or long-term cyclic changes in preservation.

== Introduction ==
The fossil record exhibits bias at many different levels. At the most basic level, there is a global bias towards biomineralizing organisms (Note: This is not the case in many Konservat-Lagerstätte. For example, in the Burgess Shale, 86% of the species and 98% of the individual fossils collected were soft bodied.), because biomineralized body parts are more resistant to decay and degradation. Due to the principle of uniformitarianism, there is a basic assumption in geology that the formation of rocks has occurred by the same naturalistic processes throughout history, and thus that the reach of such biases remains stable over time. A megabias is a direct contradiction of this, whereby changes occur in large scale paleobiologic patterns. This includes:

- Changes in diversity and community structure over tens of millions of years
- Variation in the quality of the fossil record between mass and background extinction times
- Variation among different climate states, biogeographic provinces, and tectonic settings.

It is generally assumed that the quality of the fossil record decreases globally and across all taxa with increasing age, because more time is available for the diagenesis and destruction of both fossils and enclosing rocks, and thus the term "megabias" is usually used to refer to global trends in preservation. However, it has been noted that the fossil record of some taxa actually improves with greater age. Examples such as this, and other related paleobiological trends, clearly indicate the action of a megabias, but only within one particular taxon. Hence, it is necessary to define four classes of megabias related to the reach of the bias, first defined by Kowalewski and Flessa.

== Within-taxon megabias ==
A change in the quality of a single taxon's record. It may happen whenever evolutionary, environmental, or geologic trends affect the taxon's fossilization potential.

== Among-taxon static megabias ==
This occurs when the fossilization potential varies from group to group. Among-taxon megabiases include both static and dynamic distortions. A static megabias is constant through time. For example, flatworms have always had a poor record relative to mollusks because mollusks as a taxon are almost always biomineralizing, whereas flatworms are almost never biomineralizing.

== Among-taxon dynamic megabias ==
A dynamic megabias occurs when the fossilization potential of one group relative to that of another group changes through time. For example, lingulide brachiopods had a lower fossilization potential than articulate brachiopods, but only in the early Paleozoic. This has changed through time, governed by changes in bathymetry and lateral shifts in lithofacies associated with basin evolution. By the Middle Ordovician, articulates had diversified to become important components of all marine environments except the deep basin; inarticulates were most important in offshore and basinal settings. By moving away from the main taphonomic window (e.g., the regions of the basin most likely to accumulate and preserve sediments, like areas with positive accommodation space, deltaic fans, areas that can accumulate storm deposits, or carbonate platforms), the inarticulates sacrificed their fossilization potential whilst not necessarily decreasing their biological diversity.

== Global megabias ==
A global megabias is one that occurs over the whole world, though not necessarily in all depositional environments. There are numerous documented examples of this, many of which concern the Cambrian explosion and the Ediacaran fauna, both divisive subjects within the paleobiological community.

=== Cambrian reduction of phosphatization ===
Many fossils, such as the Cambrian Small Shelly Fauna (SSF), are preserved through secondary phosphatization. Such preservation can boost the diversity estimates in three ways:

- By preserving fossils that might otherwise be destroyed
- By preserving fine anatomical structures that enhance taxonomic resolution. Small anatomical details will show differences between two specimens that would otherwise be lumped within the same group; in this way, an inflated measure of diversity is given
- By allowing easy collection. Phosphatized organisms are incredibly easily to extract by acid maceration, allowing large numbers of specimens to be collected with ease.

The number of phosphatic facies deposits decreases significantly from the early- to mid-Cambrian. Most probably, this is the cause for the pattern of SSF diversity decline after the Botomian extinction. Whilst there may well have been a significant extinction worldwide of small shelly fossils, a significant decrease in the abundance of phosphatized facies may have caused the decline in SF diversity to appear much more severe than it really was.

=== Overabundance of Konservat-Lagerstätten ===
It has been noted after the last 20 years that Exceptional Faunas, a particular class of Konservat-Lagerstätten exemplified by Burgess shale deposits, are statistically overabundant considering their age and style of preservation. This problem is also known as the "Post-Cambrian closure of the deep-water slope-basin taphonomic window". It seems that the cause of this may have been ecological, at least in the root cause; a post-Cambrian changes in the amount of bioturbation in deeper-water low oxygen environments increased sedimentary porosity and thus enhanced microbial activity and accelerated rates of decay. These higher rates of decay after the Cambrian meant that many soft bodied organisms were destroyed before the opportunity for preservation arose.

== See also ==
- Taphonomy – Study of decomposition and fossilization of organisms
