= Alloisoleucine =

Identifiers
CAS Number	L: 1509-35-8; D: 1509-34-9; racemic: 3107-04-8
3D model (JSmol)	L: Interactive image; D: Interactive image; racemic: Interactive image
Beilstein Reference	1721791
ChEBI	L: CHEBI:43433; D: CHEBI:20899
ChEMBL	L: ChEMBL56053
ChemSpider	L: 89698; D: 85019
DrugBank	L: DB01739
ECHA InfoCard	100.014.676
EC Number	L: 216-142-3; racemic: 207-139-8
PubChem CID	L: 99288; D: 94206
UNII	L: 6RNR8XN7S2; racemic: 05T3WT3PJ1
CompTox Dashboard (EPA)	L: DTXSID901019590
- InChI: InChI=1S/C6H13NO2/c1-3-4(2)5(7)6(8)9/h4-5H,3,7H2,1-2H3,(H,8,9)/t4-,5+/m1/s1 Key: AGPKZVBTJJNPAG-UHNVWZDZSA-N; D: InChI=1S/C6H13NO2/c1-3-4(2)5(7)6(8)9/h4-5H,3,7H2,1-2H3,(H,8,9)/t4-,5+/m0/s1 Key: AGPKZVBTJJNPAG-CRCLSJGQSA-N
- SMILES: L: CC[C@@H](C)[C@@H](C(=O)O)N; D: CC[C@H](C)[C@H](C(=O)O)N; racemic: CCC(C)C(C(=O)O)N

Properties
Chemical formula	C_{6}H_{13}NO_{2}
Molar mass	131.175 g·mol^{−1}
Appearance	white solid
Melting point	285 °C (545 °F; 558 K)
- Except where otherwise noted, data are given for materials in their standard state (at 25 °C [77 °F], 100 kPa). Infobox references

Alloisoleucine is an amino acid with the formula CH_{3}CH_{2}CH(CH_{3})CH(NH_{2})CO_{2}H. It is the diastereomer of isoleucine, differing in the stereochemistry within the side chain. Alloisoleucine exists as two enantiomers, of which the L isomer occurs naturally. L-Alloisoleucine occurs in healthy serum in only trace amounts, except for individuals suffering from maple syrup urine disease.

== Structure ==
Together with valine, leucine, and isoleucine, alloisoleucine is classified as a branched-chain amino acid (BCAA). The L enantiomer of valine, leucine, and isoleucine are proteinogenic amino acids; alloisoleucine is non-proteinogenic.

l-isoleucine (2S,3S) and d-isoleucine (2R,3R)

l-alloisoleucine (2S,3R) and d-alloisoleucine (2R,3S)

== Role in biosynthesis ==
L-Alloisoleucine is a precursor to coronatine, a phytotoxin produced by Pseudomonas syringae.
