= Bruce H. Garnsey =

Bruce H. Garnsey AO, MBE

Chairman of the World Organization of the Scout Movement's Asia-Pacific committee

Bruce Hugh Garnsey AO MBE (26 September 1920 – 17 April 2006) was a chairman of the World Organization of the Scout Movement (WOSM) Asia Pacific committee.

Garnsey was made a member of the Order of the British Empire (MBE) in the 1964 Queen's birthday honours for his service as the Australian Boy Scouts' Association's national commissioner for training.

In 1971, WOSM awarded Garnsey its 62nd Bronze Wolf Award for exceptional services to world Scouting.

In the 1978 Australia Day Honours he was made an Officer of the Order of Australia (AO) for "For distinguished service to the Scout Association of Australia and to world scouting".

His death was recorded in the Triennial Report 2005–2008: In Support of World Scouting 5.
