= Carbonaceous film (paleontology) =

Evidence of prehistoric life

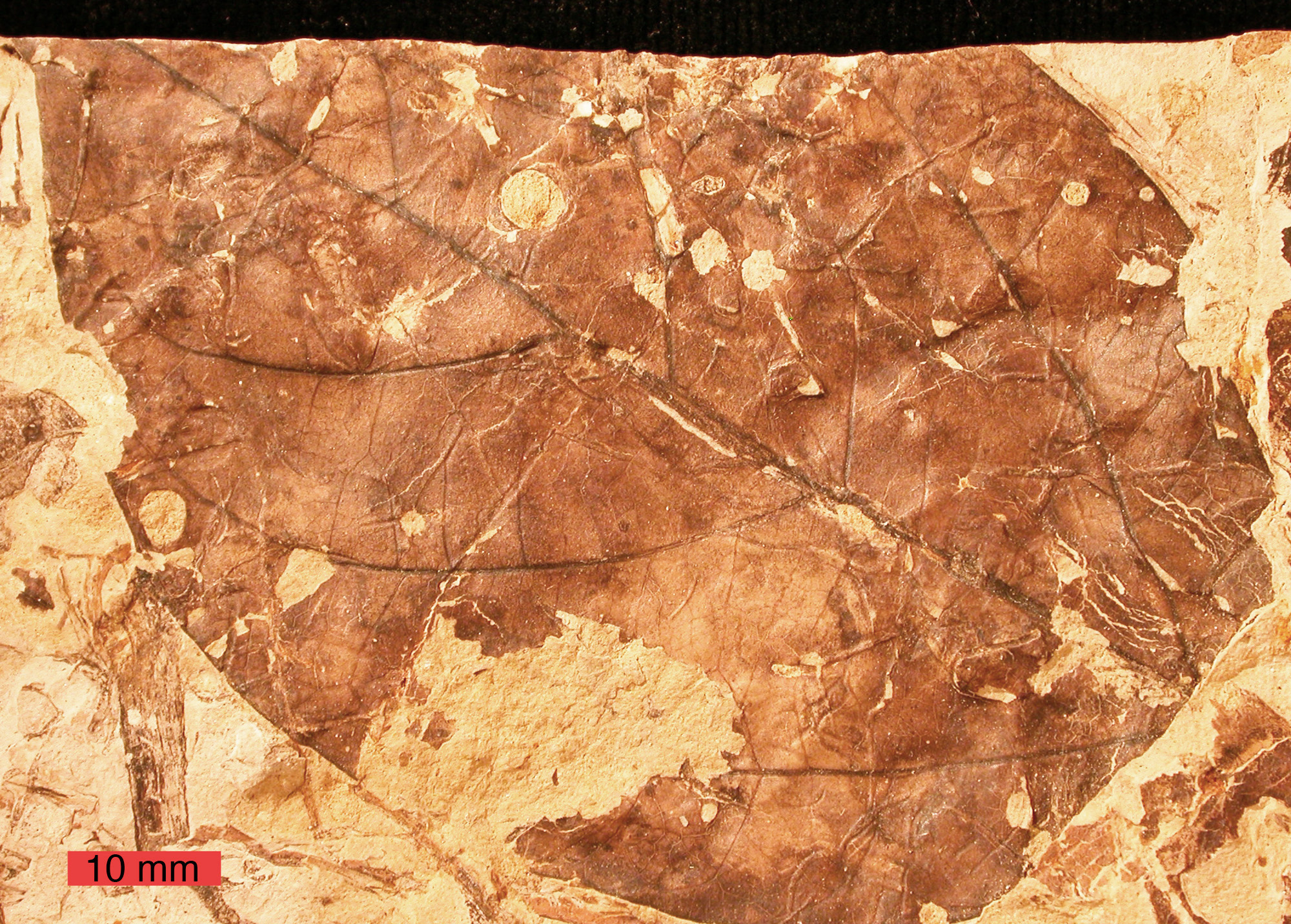
Carbonaceous film of a Viburnum lesquereuxii leaf with insect damage; Dakota Sandstone (Cretaceous) of Ellsworth County, Kansas. Scale bar is 10 mm.

A carbonaceous film or carbon film is an organism outline of a fossil. It is a type of fossil found in any rock when organic material is compressed, leaving only a carbon residue or film.

When an organism is buried under many layers of sediment, pressure and heat increase during diagenesis and if the organism lacks a hard skeleton, it will only leave this thin film of carbon residue on rock surfaces.

The soft tissues of organisms are made largely of organic carbon compounds. Sometimes, fossils contain only carbon. Fossils usually form when sediment buries a dead organism. As sediment piles up, the organism's remains are subjected to pressure and heat. These conditions force gases and liquids from the body. A thin film of carbon residue is left, forming a silhouette of the original organism called a carbon film. Plant fossils often occur as a residue or film of carbon.

The delicate fossils of the Burgess Shale include carbon film forms. Graptolites are an example of carbon film fossils.
