= Conservation paleobiology =

Field of paleontology

Conservation paleobiology is a field of paleontology that applies the knowledge of the geological and paleoecological record to the conservation and restoration of biodiversity and ecosystem services. Despite the influence of paleontology on ecological sciences can be traced back at least at the 18th century, the current field has been established by the work of K.W. Flessa and G.P. Dietl in the first decade of the 21st century. The discipline utilizes paleontological and geological data to understand how biotas respond to climate and other natural and anthropogenic environmental change. This information is then used to address the challenges faced by modern conservation biology, like understanding the extinction risk of endangered species, providing baselines for restoration and modelling future scenarios for species range's contraction or expansion.

== Description of the discipline ==
The main strength of conservation paleobiology is the availability of long term data on species, communities and ecosystems that exceeds the timeframe of direct human experience. The discipline takes one of two approaches: near-time and deep-time.

=== Near-time conservation paleobiology ===
The near-time approach uses the recent fossil record (usually from the Late Pleistocene or the Holocene) to provide a long-term context to extant ecosystems dynamics. The fossil record is, in many cases, the only source of information on conditions previous to human impacts. These records can be used as reference baselines for comparisons in order to identify targets for restoration ecology, to analyze species responses to perturbations (natural and anthropogenic), understand historical species distributions and their variability, discriminate the factors that distinguish natural from non-natural changes in biological populations and identify ecological legacies only explicable by referring to past events or conditions.

==== Example - Conservation of the European bison ====
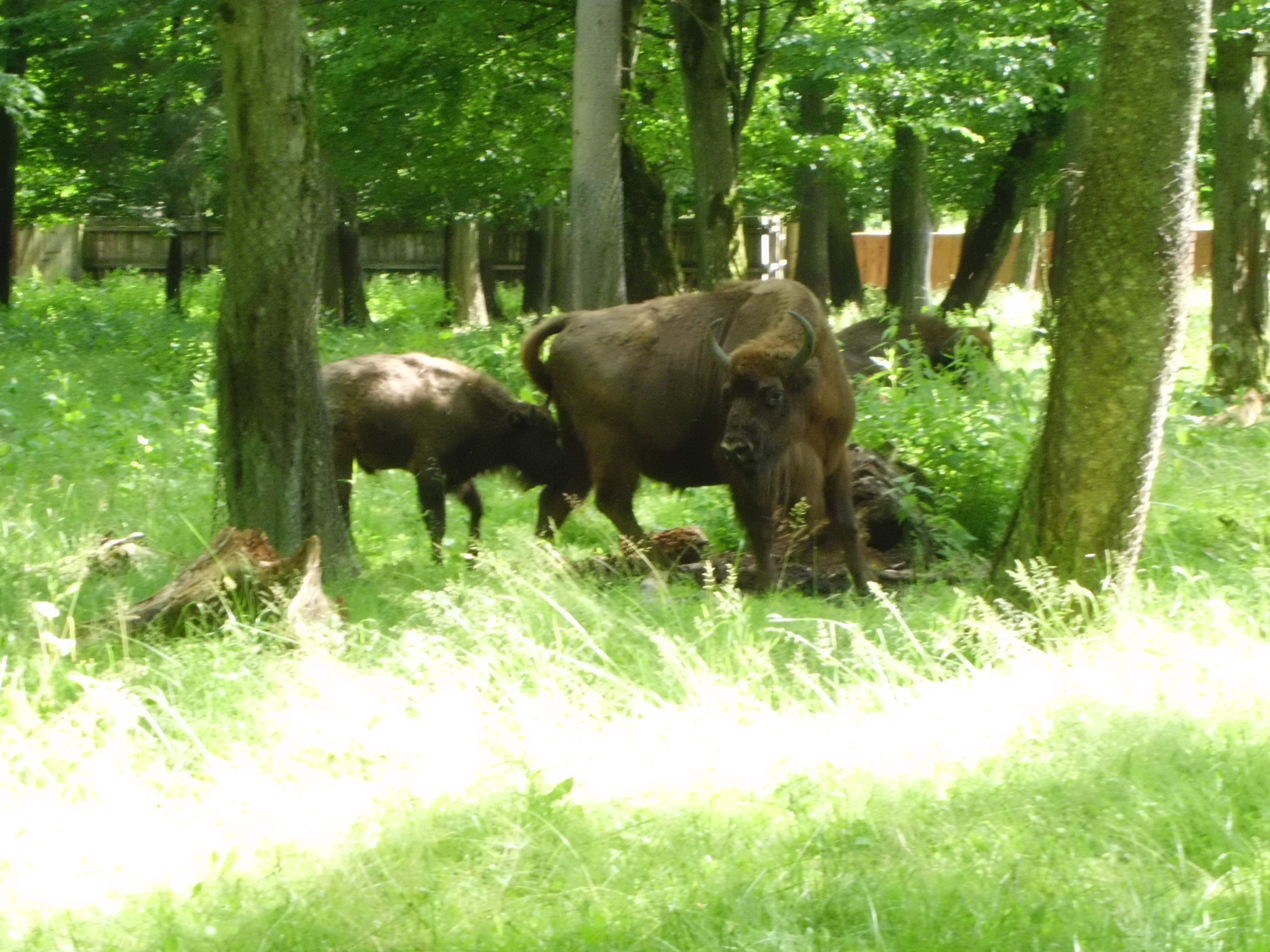
European bison with juvenile in the Bialowieza Forest

The European bison or wisent (Bison bonasus) is a large herbivore once widespread in Europe that saw a range decrease over the last thousand years, surviving only in Central European forests with the last wild population going extinct in Bialowieza forest in 1921. Starting from 1929, reintroduction of animals from zoos allowed the species to recover in the wild. The historical range of Bison bonasus was limited to forested areas, so since at least the sixteenth century conservation measures to preserve the species were based on the assumption that a forest would be the optimal habitat of the species. Ecological, morphological and paleoecological evidence, however, shows that B. bonasus is best adapted to open or mixed environments, indicating that the species was "forced" into a suboptimal habitat due to human influences such as habitat loss, competition with livestock, diseases and hunting. This information has been applied recently to adopt measures more suitable for the conservation of the species.

=== Deep-time conservation paleobiology ===
The deep-time approach uses examples of species, communities and ecosystem responses to environmental changes on a longer geologic record, as an archive of natural ecological and evolutionary laboratory. This approach provides examples to infer possible settings concerning climate warming, introduction of invasive species and decline in cultural eutrophication. This also permits the identification of species responses to perturbations of various types and scale to serve as a model for the future scenarios, for example abrupt climate change or volcanic winters. Given its deep-time nature, this approach allows for testing how organisms or ecosystems react to a bigger set of conditions than what is observable in the modern world or in the recent past.

==== Example - Insect damage and increasing temperatures ====
A pressing issue related to current global warming is the potential expansion in the range of tropical and subtropical crop pests, however the signal related to this poleward expansion is not clear. The analyses of the fossil record from past warm intervals of Earth's history (Paleogene-Eocene Thermal Maximum) provides an adequate comparison to test this hypothesis. Data shows that, during warmer climates, the frequency and diversity of insect damage to North American plants increased significantly, providing support to the hypothesis of pests expansion due to global warming.

== Relevance to conservation biology ==
Over the years, numerous attempts have been made to increase the synergy between paleobiologists and conservation scientists and managers. Despite being recognized as a useful tool to address current biodiversity problems, fossil data is still rarely included in contemporary conservation-related research, with the vast majority of studies focusing on short timescales. However, a few authors have used comparisons of extinction in the geologic past to taxon losses in modern times providing important perspectives on the severity of the modern biodiversity crisis

Marine paleobiology is an interdisciplinary study that utilizes the tools of paleontology and applies them to marine conservation biology. Looking at the deep-time fossil record separates this field from historical ecology.
