= Garnsey kill site =

Ancient sacrificial spot

Coordinates: 33.3143°N 104.3230°W

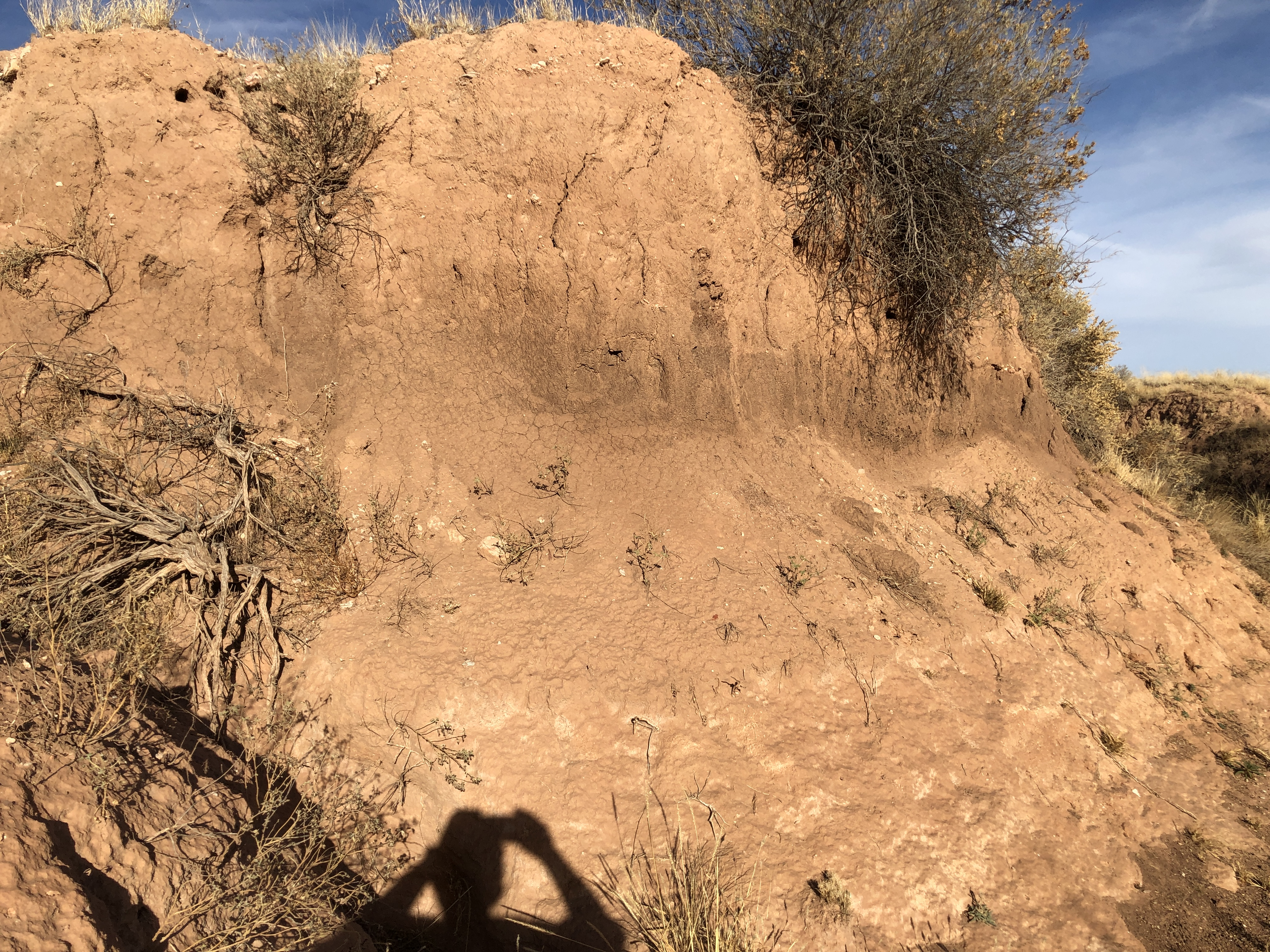
Paleosol profile at the Garnsey Bison Kill site. Bones occur through the deposits.

Garnsey kill site is an ancient bison kill site near Roswell, New Mexico. A brochure to the site is available from the Bureau of Land management, although little can be seen today.

== Excavations ==
The site is located adjacent the southeast corner of Bottomless Lake State Park, about 12 miles southeast of Roswell, New Mexico. The site was excavated by the University of Michigan Museum of Anthropology in 1977 and 1978 and an adjacent site originally thought to be the campsite. Bison bones were found in clusters eroding from Garnsey Arroyo,

The kill site represents approximately 200–300 years of repeated bison kills by protohistoric and historic Southern High Plains peoples. The original drainage was slowly filled, in part by the trapping of sediment by the bones. More recent overgrazing caused erosion producing the current Garnsey Arroyo and exposed the bones in the arroyo walls. It is estimated that 50%-60% of the original site was destroyed before the site was discovered and excavated.

A separate site, Garnsey Spring, was originally thought to be the campsite associated with the kill site, but excavations did not confirm an association. Radiocarbon dates of two hearths indicate AD 885=/-55 and AD 1640+/-50.

== Scientific Results ==
A dark band or paleosol exposed in the arroyo walls was interpreted as "marsh" deposits. The water was believed to originate from a nearby spring and is what attracted the bison to the area. At least three buried soils are present at the site.

Bone damage and breakage patterns show that the animals were butchered for meat and marrow extraction. Both of these are common practices of Plains Indians. Based on skulls, the ratio of males to females is 3:2, but the ratio based on mandibles is female to male ratio of 3:2. One problem with these results is that all of the specimens were treated as a single event, rather than the three events shown by the excavations. Tooth eruption and wear indicate the animals were killed in the spring (April–May). Fetal and neonatal remains indicate this was also the calving season Based on MNI (minimum number of individuals) of the bones, at least 10 different individuals to possibly as many as 35 individuals are represented at the site. Other bones found include a human mandible, a hybrid dog-wolf skull, various bones of pronghorn antelope and deer.

Lithic artifacts include small, unmodified flakes, points, bifaces, end scrapers, unifaces, used flakes, and cores. Tools made from local stones have a different edge angle than those made of non-local stones. The reason was suggested as due to different types of tools were made based on the source of the stone Projectiles include Harrell and Washita. The Washita is especially common across the southern Plains and is thought to be Apache. The low number of projectiles recovered for the number of individuals was explained as indicating bone and wooden spears were also used. Such spear usage is supported by early historic studies of Southern Plains tribes.

Only 19 pottery sherds were recovered and classified into six types, with an age range of AD 900–1400. Unfortunately, the context of the fragments is not given, so it is not known if they were found with the bison bones.

Radiometric dates of the bone indicate the site was formed between A.D. 1450–1630.

== Significance ==
The Garnsey Site is one of the few Protohistoric and Historic bison kill sites in the Southern High Plains (Llano Estacado). Most of the sites from this time interval are from Texas, and include Lubbock Lake, Quitique and Post. The site also produced the first documented dog-wolf hybrid from the Southern Plains.
