= Xiuningella =

Xiuningella Temporal range: Early Ediacaran ~602 Ma
- Fossil of Xiuningella rara

Scientific classification
- Kingdom: incertae sedis
- Genus: †Xiuningella; Wan et al., 2016

Type species
- † Xiuningella rara Wan et al., 2016

Extinct genus of enigmatic cylindrical-shaped fossils

Xiuningella is an extinct, enigmatic fossil from the early Ediacaran, and was alive around 602 Ma in the Lantian Formation. It has an slender, cylindrical-shaped body, and is regarded as either putative bilaterian-grade organism, a putative cnidarian-grade organism, or an epibenthic macro-algae, the latter of which is more favoured. It is a monotypic genus, containing only Xiuningella rara.

== Discovery and naming ==
Fossils of Xiuningella were first found and reported from the black shale "Member II" of the Lantian Formation in Xiuning County, Anhui Province of South China in 2011 as "Type D", and which were formally described and named in 2016.

The generic name Xiuningella derives from the place name of Xiuning County, the county in which the fossils were found from. The specific name rara derives directly from the Latin word of the same spelling, "rara", to mean "rare", in reference to the notably rarity of the fossils in the Lantian Biota.

== Description ==
Reconstruction of X. rara

Xiuningella rara are centimetre-scale, slender cylindrical-shaped fossils, set on top of a short and narrow stalk with a potential holdfast preserved in some specimens. The main cylindrical tube, which attains a height of only 18 mm (0.7 in) and a width of 1.4 mm (0.06 in), has a notable axial longitudinal structure occurring in it, which itself is only 0.25 mm (0.010 in) in width and runs along only half the length of the tube. All of this is set upon a short, narrow stalk, which is only 1.3 mm (0.051 in) in length and 0.4 mm (0.016 in) in width, constricting to just 0.2 mm (0.008 in) at the contact point between the stalk and the main body. At the base of this stalk can be found a bulbous, holdfast-like structure, which is 0.5 mm (0.020 in) in diameter.

== Affinities ==
When the fossils were first reported by Yuan et al. in 2011, they had designated fossils of Xiuningella as "Type D", and regarded the form as possibly being a bilateral, worm-like animal similar to the scalidophorans, with the axial structure being its digestive tract, whilst the stalk and bulbous structure were the proboscis. They also made comparisons to a similarly putative bilateral metazoan fossil from the Miaohe biota of the Doushantuo Formation, which is also a ribbon-like compression with an axial structure of a similar width. Wan et al. 2016 regarded this affinity interpretation as interesting, although noted that definitive evidence such as scalids and pharyngeal teeth are not present in the few known fossils, thus precluding any further comparisons. They also noted that it was more likely to be an epibenthic algal fossil, due to its overall simple morphology.

Wan et al. also noted some similarities to Piyuania and Qianchuania, suggesting that the bulbous structure could be a holdfast, the axial structure was an inner structure, and the overal slender shape of the body is similar to the slender spindle-like shape of Qianchuania. Although they also went on to note that Xuiningella is considerably smaller than the two taxa, has a much more smoother margin compared to the irregular margin of Piyuania and Qianchuania, and also does not preserve and tentacle-like structures at all. Cunningham et al. in 2017 also noted the resemblances to scalidophoran worms, although similar to Wan et al., they state that further evidence was required to back this up, and that a macro-algae interpretation could not be ruled out. In 2022, Martynov et Korshunova regarded Xiuningella as a macro-algae. which would be further supported.

== See also ==
- List of Ediacaran genera
