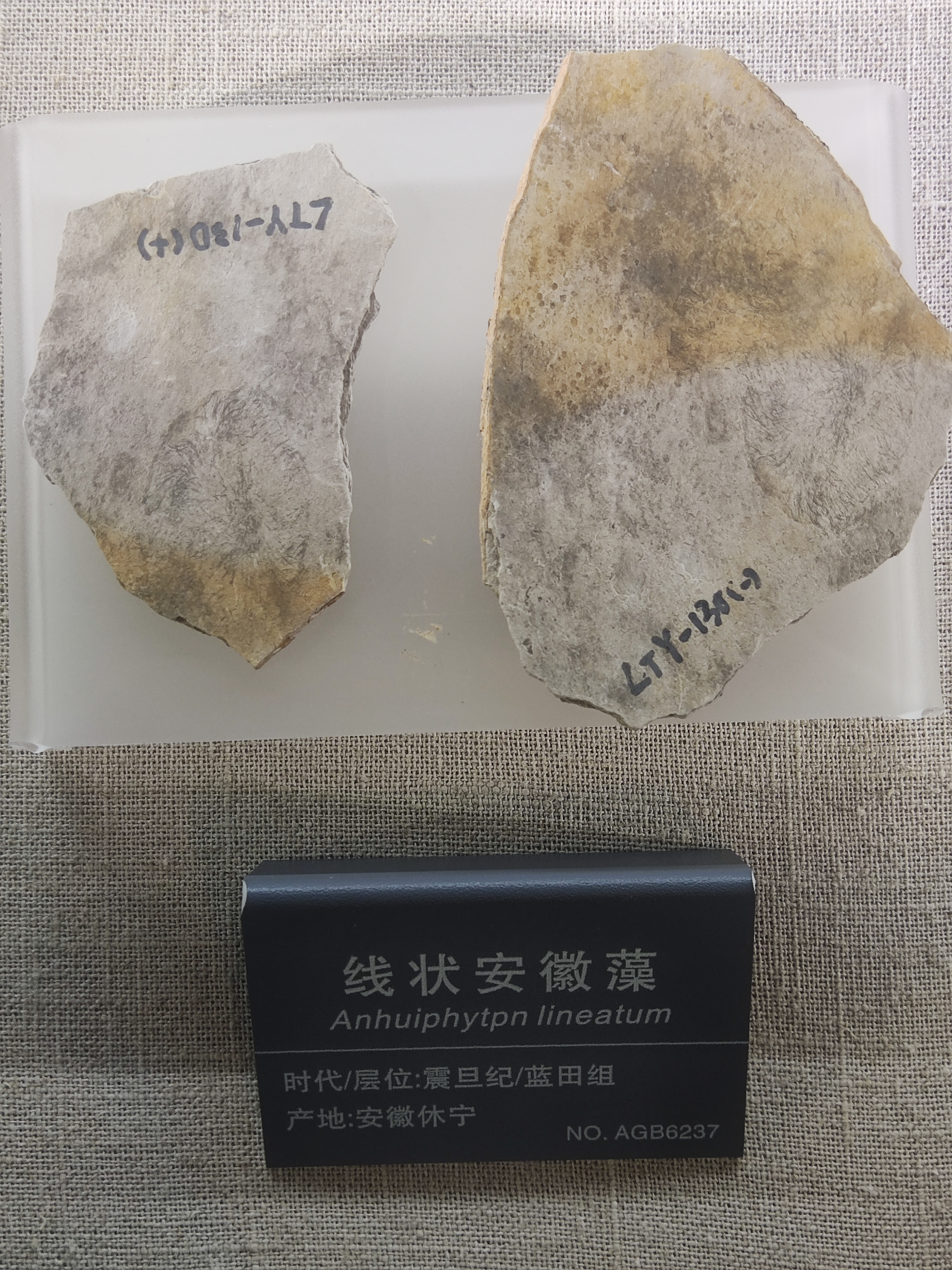
- Fossil material of Anhuiphyton lineatum in the Anhui Geological Museum

Scientific classification
- Domain: Eukaryota
- Supergroup: Archaeplastida
- Genus: †Anhuiphyton; Chen, Lu et Xiao, 1994 (emend. Yuan et al., 1999)

Type species
- † Anhuiphyton lineatum Chen, Lu et Xiao, 1994 (emend. Yuan et al., 1999)

Synonyms
- Sinotaenia lantiansis Yan et al. 1992 (nomen nudem)

= Anhuiphyton =

Anhuiphyton Temporal range: Ediacaran ~602–551 Ma

Extinct species of enigmatic algae

Anhuiphyton is an extinct genus of macro-algae fossil from the Ediacaran of South China. It is a small, spherical-shaped algal fossil, although its affinities remain unknown. It is a monotypic genus, containing Anhuiphyton lineatum.

== Discovery and naming ==
Fossils of Anhuiphyton were first found in the Lantian Formation of Xiuning County, Anhui Province of South China in 1994, and although it was named, Michael Steiner suggested it had not been properly described, thus making it a nomen nudem, or "naked name". Steiner would validate in the same year. In 1999, the original description would be emended, with Steiner's validation overridden as such.

The generic name Anhuiphyton derives from the place name "Anhui", in reference to where it was found, and the Greek word "phyton", to mean "plant". The specific name lineatum derives directly from the neuter Latin word "lineatum", to mean "striped".

== Description ==
Line drawing reconstruction of Anhuiphyton lineatum from the Lantian Formation

Anhuiphyton lineatum is a small macro-algae, with tufts or loose aggregates of septated filaments numbering between 1000 – 1500. The filaments range from 35–170 μm (0.0014–0.0067 in) in width and 15–20 mm (1–1 in) in length, and are rarely branching. The overall size of Anhuiphyton's thallus are 15 mm–20 mm × 25 mm–50 mm (1 in–1 in × 1 in–2 in) in diameter, whilst fossils of fragmented and loose filaments cover an area 70 mm × 40 mm (2.8 in × 1.6 in) More complete specimens show that the filaments concentrate in a centralized area, which is inferred to potentially be where a holdfast was, although non preserve one.

== Affinities ==
Due to the lack of good preservation in the original material of the 1994 description, Steiner was unable to classify it, as well as noting the issue that it may have been a decomposed or still developing forms of Flabellophyton lantianensis, although they did note is bore some similarities to the Cambrian cyanobacterial species Marpolia spissa. Steiner also noted that Huangshanophyton was nomen nudem, thus making it invalid, and synonymized it with Anhuiphyton.

In 1999, Yuan et al. would reject this, noting that the descriptions made in Chen, Lu et Xiao in 1994 were understandable, and the holotypes clearly stated, as well as on the basis of the discovery of more complete material. Thus, they would instead suggest an emendation, instead of an outright replacement. Yuan et al. would also regard Anhuiphyton as a form of eukaryotic algae, although placement within a higher taxonomic level was precluded, with Anhuiphyton and other Lantian biota taxa either being Chlorophyta, Rhodophyta, or Phaeophyta based on their overall morphology. The placement as a eukaryotic algae has been supported since, with no further assignment to higher taxonomic levels.

== Distribution ==
Anhuiphyton is predominately known from the Lantian Formation, although it has also been found in the Wenghui biota of the upper Doushantuo Formation.

== See also ==
- Huangshanophyton
