= Katian =

Second stage of the Upper Ordovician

- 452.8 ± 0.7 – 445.2 ± 0.9 Ma
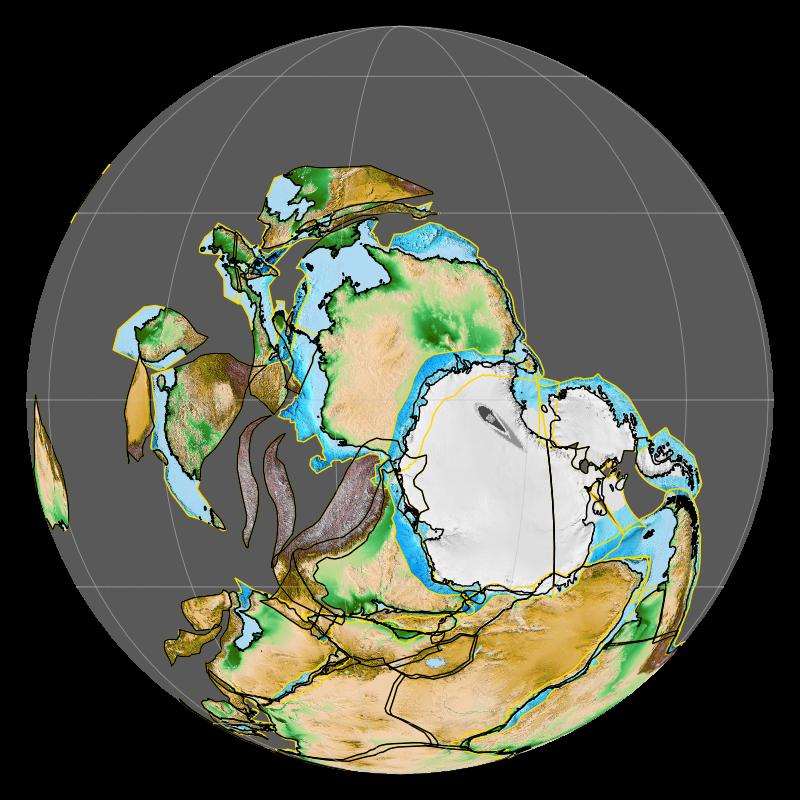
- Paleogeography of the Katian, 450 Ma

Chronology
← / First land plant spores; ← / Ordovician meteor event
Subdivision of the Ordovician according to the ICS, as of 2024. Vertical axis scale: Millions of years ago

Etymology
- Name formality: Formal

Usage information
- Celestial body: Earth
- Regional usage: Global (ICS)
- Time scale(s) used: ICS Time Scale

Definition
- Chronological unit: Age
- Stratigraphic unit: Stage
- Time span formality: Formal
- Lower boundary definition: FAD of the graptolite Diplacanthograptus caudatus
- Lower boundary GSSP: Black Knob Ridge section, Oklahoma, United States; 34.4305°N 96.0746°W
- Lower GSSP ratified: 2006
- Upper boundary definition: FAD of the graptoliteNormalograptus extraordinarius
- Upper boundary GSSP: Wangjiawan section, Wangjiawan, Yichang, China; 30.9841°N 111.4197°E
- Upper GSSP ratified: 2006

The Katian is the second stage of the Upper Ordovician. It is preceded by the Sandbian and succeeded by the Hirnantian Stage. The Katian began 452.8 million years ago and lasted for about 7.6 million years until the beginning of the Hirnantian 445.2 million years ago. During the Katian the climate cooled which started the Late Ordovician glaciation.

== Naming ==
The name Katian is derived from Katy Lake (Atoka County, Oklahoma, United States).

== GSSP ==
The GSSP of the Katian Stage is the Black Knob Ridge Section in southeastern Oklahoma (United States). It is an outcrop of the Womble Shale and the Bigfork Chert, the latter containing the lower boundary of the Katian. The lower boundary is defined as the first appearance datum of the graptolite species Diplacanthograptus caudatus. This horizon is 4.0 m above the base of the Bigfork Chert.
