= Starorusskaya Formation =

Geologic formation in Northwestern Russia

- Stratigraphic range: late Ediacaran; ~559–557 Ma
- Type: Formation
- Unit of: Valdai Group
- Sub-units: Lower, middle, and upper members
- Underlies: Vasilevskyostrov Formation
- Overlies: (Unconformably) Priozerskaya Formation
- Thickness: 44–52 m (144–171 ft)

Lithology
- Primary: Argillite, Sandstone, Siltstone
- Other: Conglomerates, Clay

Location
- Country: Northwest Russia

Type section
- Named for: Staraya Russa
- Named by: Geisler
- Year defined: 1967

The Starorusskaya Formation, also known as the Staraya Russa Formation, is a fossiliferous Ediacaran geologic formation found on the northwestern side of the East European Platform in Northwestern Russia.

== Geology ==
The Starorusskaya Formation is primarily composed of grayish green siltstones, and consists of three members, all of which are fossiliferous in nature. The formation unconformably overlies the quartz-sandstone of the Priozerskaya Formation. The Starorusskaya Formation is overlain by the lower sandy layers of the Vasilevskyostrov Formation,

=== Members ===
The three members are as follows, in ascending stratigraphic order (lowest to highest):

- Lower Member: This member is characterised by clays with sandstone interbeds. There are also greenish-gray to blueish thin-bedded sandy and silty clays, which is replaced in the upper sections of the member by dense greenish-gray clays. There are also light gray quartz sandstones, ranging from fine-medium-grained to coarse-grained, and contain a mixture of gravels. It is up to 16.3 m thick, and contains the microfossils of the formation.
- Middle Member: This member is composed primarily of clays. This includes dark red clays with thin interbeds of light gray siltstones. Other areas contain gray, thin-bedded silty clays, containing interbeds of fine-gravel and sandstones. It is up to 22 m thick, and contains the least amount of fossils in the formation
- Upper Member: This member is composed of thin interbedded sandstones, siltstones and clays. The clays are predominately blueish to greenish-gray, which are finely laminated and leafy, containing dark red spots throughout. The sandstones and siltstones are greenish-gray also, with the sandstones being coarse-grained. It is up to 13.4 m thick, and contains the macrofossils of the formation.

== Dating ==
U-Pb dating had been performed on zircon crystals collected throughout the Starorusskaya Formation in 2017, although it was discovered that all yielded dates were older than 1.5 Ga, being dominated by crystals from the Paleoproterozoic and Mesoproterozoic, including some samples being Archean in age, whilst samples from the overlying Vasilevskyostrov Formation yielded dates expected for the region. In 2019, the Starorusskaya Formation was dated based on sequence stratigraphy, with it corresponding to the Lyamsta Formation in the Southeastern White Sea area, as well as the Staropechny and Perevalok formations, which dates the Starorusskaya Formation to between 559 Ma and 557 Ma, some 9 to 7 million years older than the Kotlin Crisis.

== Paleoenvironment ==
From the information gathered from the lithology of the Starorusskaya Formation, its paleoenvironment was most likely a sloped environment either below the wave base or even storm wave base, and was within the photic zone, inferred from the presence of Doushantuophyton lineare, overall suggesting a prodelta environment where organisms could be buried in situ.

== Paleobiota ==
The Starorusskaya Formation contains a number of organisms from the Ediacaran, from a small collection of aritarchs such as Leiosphaeridia, classic Ediacaran algae such as Doushantuophyton, and some unique forms such as the rod-like Redkinia.

Color key: Taxon / Reclassified taxon / Taxon falsely reported as present / Dubious taxon or junior synonym / Ichnotaxon / Ootaxon / Morphotaxon

Notes
Uncertain or tentative taxa are in small text
~~crossed out~~ taxa are discredited.

=== incertae sedis ===
| Genus | Species | Notes | Images |
|---|---|---|---|
| Orbisiana | Orbisiana sp.; O. simplex | Palaeopascichnid organism. | |
| Redkinia | R. spinosa | Rod-like fossils, possible jaw fragments of stem-arthropods. | |
| Cucullus | Cucullus sp. | Tubular organism. | Line drawing of Cucullus fraudulentus |
| Sinospongia | S. typica | Sponge-like fossil, may also be an algae similar to the Huainan biota. | Line drawing of Sinospongia chenjunyuani from the Doushantuo Formation |

=== Flora ===
| Genus | Species | Notes | Images |
|---|---|---|---|
| Siphonophycus | Siphonophycus sp. | Filamentous cyanobacteria. | Line drawing reconstruction of Siphonophycus attenuatum |
| Oscillatoriopsis | Oscillatoriopsis sp. | Filamentous cyanobacteria. | Line drawing reconstruction of Oscillatoriopsis |
| Zinkovioides | Zinkovioides sp. | Filamentous cyanobacteria. | |
| Obruchevella | O. parva | Filamentous cyanobacteria. | |
| Doushantuophyton | D. lineare | Branching macroalgae. | Specimen from China |
| Morania | M. zinkovi | Filamentous cyanobacteria. | Specimen from Utah |
| Chuaria | C. circularis | Enigmatic fossil, possibly synonymous with Tawuia. | Specimen from China |
| Polytrichoides (?) | Polytrichoides (?) sp. | Filamentous algae. | |
| Mezenia-like fragments | Mezenia (?) sp. | Ribbon-like fragments, which bare similarities to the macroalgae Mezenia. | |

=== Microorganisms ===
| Genus | Species | Notes | Images |
|---|---|---|---|
| Leiosphaeridia | Leiosphaeridia sp.; L. jacutica; L. crassa; L. minutissima; L. tenuissima | Acritarch. | |
| Tynnia | T. precambrica | Acritarch. | |
| Tuberculum | T. mamillatum | Acritarch. | |
| Pterospermopsimorpha | P. insolita | Two-layed acritarch. | |
| Ceratosphaeridium | Ceratosphaeridium sp. | Acritarch. | |
| Ostiana | Ostiana sp. | Acritarch. | |
| Ceratophyton (?) | Ceratophyton (?) sp. | Cone-shaped acritarch, material has been compared to similar looking structures seen in protoconodonts. | |

=== Ichnogenera ===
| Genus | Species | Notes | Images |
|---|---|---|---|
| Chondrites | Chondrites sp. | Branching burrows. | |

== See also ==
- Ediacaran biota
