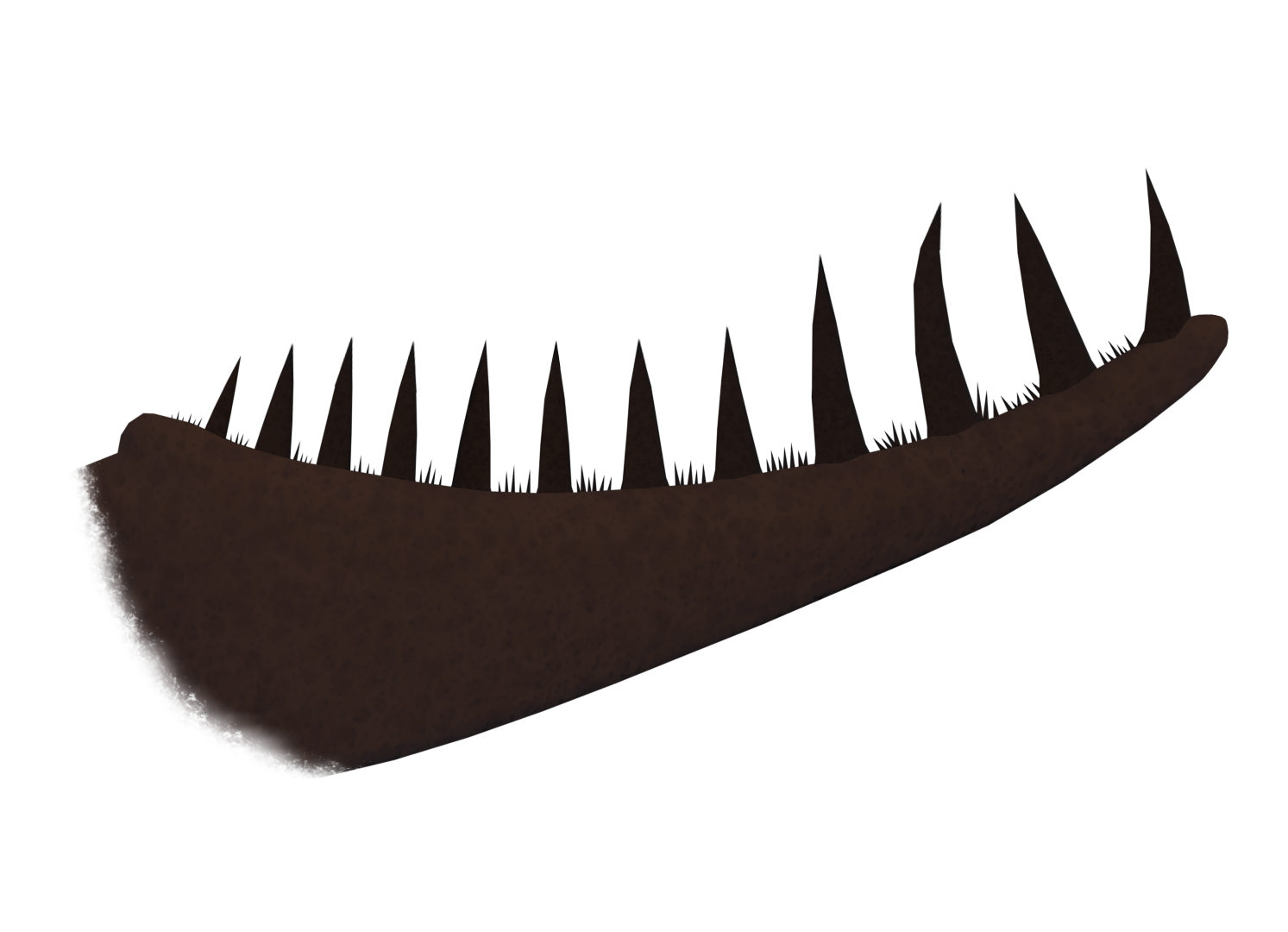
- 3D reconstruction of Redkinia spinosa

Scientific classification
- Kingdom: Animalia
- Phylum: incertae sedis
- Genus: †Redkinia; Sokolov, 1977

Type species
- †Redkinia spinosa Sokolov, 1977

Species
- R. spinosa Sokolov, 1977; R. fedonkini Assejeva, 1988

= Redkinia =

Redkinia Temporal range: late Ediacaran

Extinct enigmatic Ediacaran arthropod-like organisms

Redkinia is a genus of rod-like Ediacaran fossil from Russia, fringed with large and small projections, which has been putatively compared with the mandibles of an arthropod. It is contains two species, Redkinia spinosa and Redkinia fedonkini.

== Discovery ==
The holotype fossil of Redkinia was found from the Starorusskaya Formation of the East European Platform, Northwestern Russia and named in 1977.

== Description ==
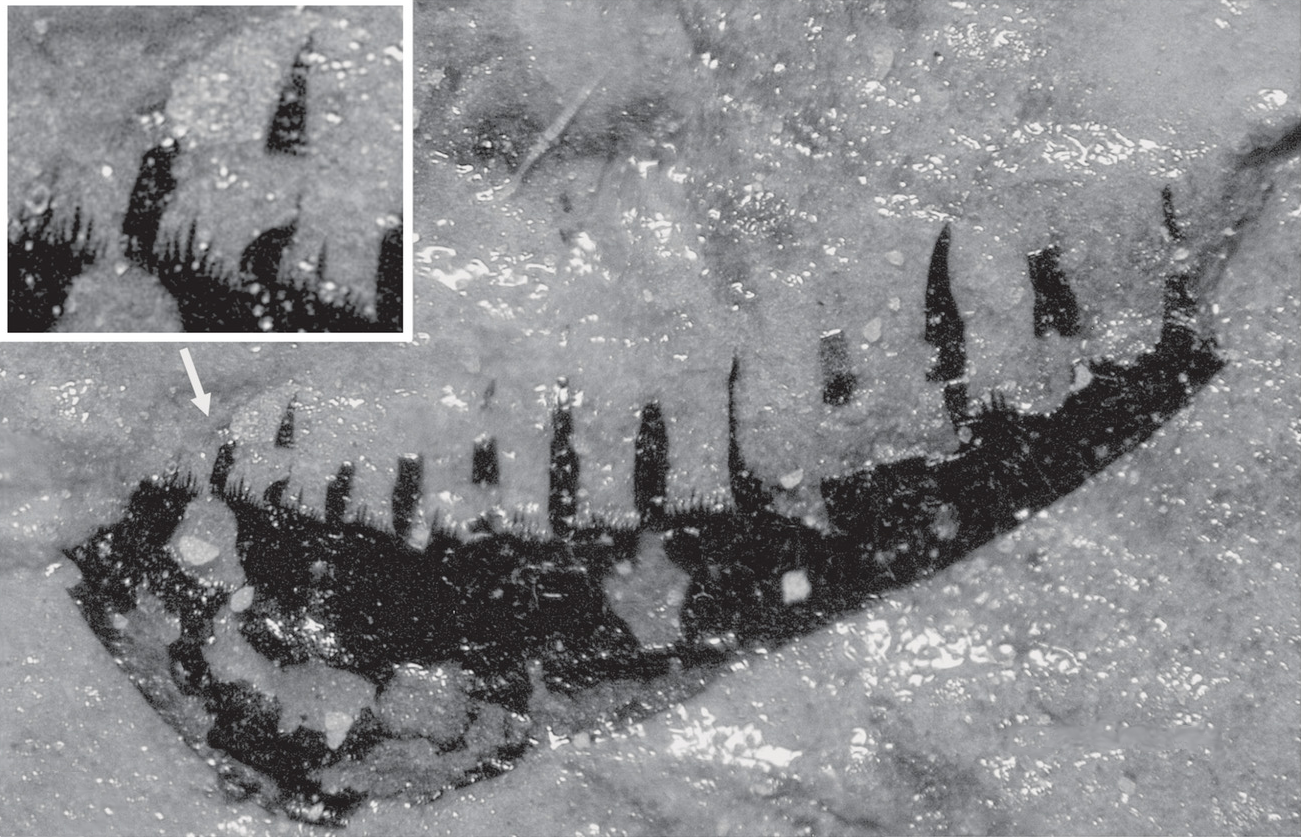
Fossil specimen of Redkinia spinosa, with close up of the serrated edge.

Redkinia is a slightly curved, tapering rod-like fossil, bearing large and small projections, usually interpreted as serrations or teeth. The main rod of R. spinosa ranges between 2–3.5 mm (0.1–0.1 in) in length, and has around 12–15 large teeth, with up to 6 smaller ones sitting in-between them. The large teeth notably increase in size from the thicker end of the rod to the thinner end, ranging from 0.3–0.45 mm (0.012–0.018 in) in length, and 0.10–0.15 mm (0.004–0.006 in) in width at their base, with a spacing of 0.15–0.20 mm (0.006–0.008 in) between each large serration.

Meanwhile, the main rod of R. fedonkini is much smaller in length, with large lanceolate-shaped teeth, ranging from 150–200 μm (0.0059–0.0079 in) in length, and 20–30 μm (0.00079–0.00118 in) in width, and spaced out by 50–60 μm (0.0020–0.0024 in). At the bases of the larger teeth, there are semicircular crown projections, up to 5 μm (0.00020 in) in width, with up to 6 smaller, curved denticles. The denticles themselves range from 6–25 μm (0.00024–0.00098 in), with the longest ones sitting near the centre of the crown, whilst the central-most denticle reaches up to 40–45 μm (0.0016–0.0018 in) in length, and 7–8 μm (0.00028–0.00031 in) in width.

== Affinites ==
The affinities of Redkinia remain unknown, with it being interpreted as a disarticulated polychaete jaw in 1977, and later to mandible-like jaws of a stem-arthropod. Some researchers have suggested the fossils to be the mouthparts of the mollusc-like organisms Wiwaxia or Kimberella. It has also been compared to other microfossils, namely Cochleatina, a serrated spiral ribbon, although it has been noted that the similarities may be homologous. Some studies have also noted that if it is a jaw, it would have been used for filter-feeding rather than crushing, with one study supporting this and also the fact that they bear similarities to teeth structures seen in scolecodonts and conodonts. One study has also noted that the fossils may not represent jaws due to delicate appearance of the serrations, and also to the age of the fossil material, although due to its complex morphology and construction, it may still represent a candidate for early bilaterian organisms.

== Distribution ==
Redkinia contains two species, both of which are from different formations. R. spinosa comes from the Starorusskaya Formation in Russia, whilst R. fedonkini comes from the Zinkov Beds of the Yarishev Formation, Ukraine.
