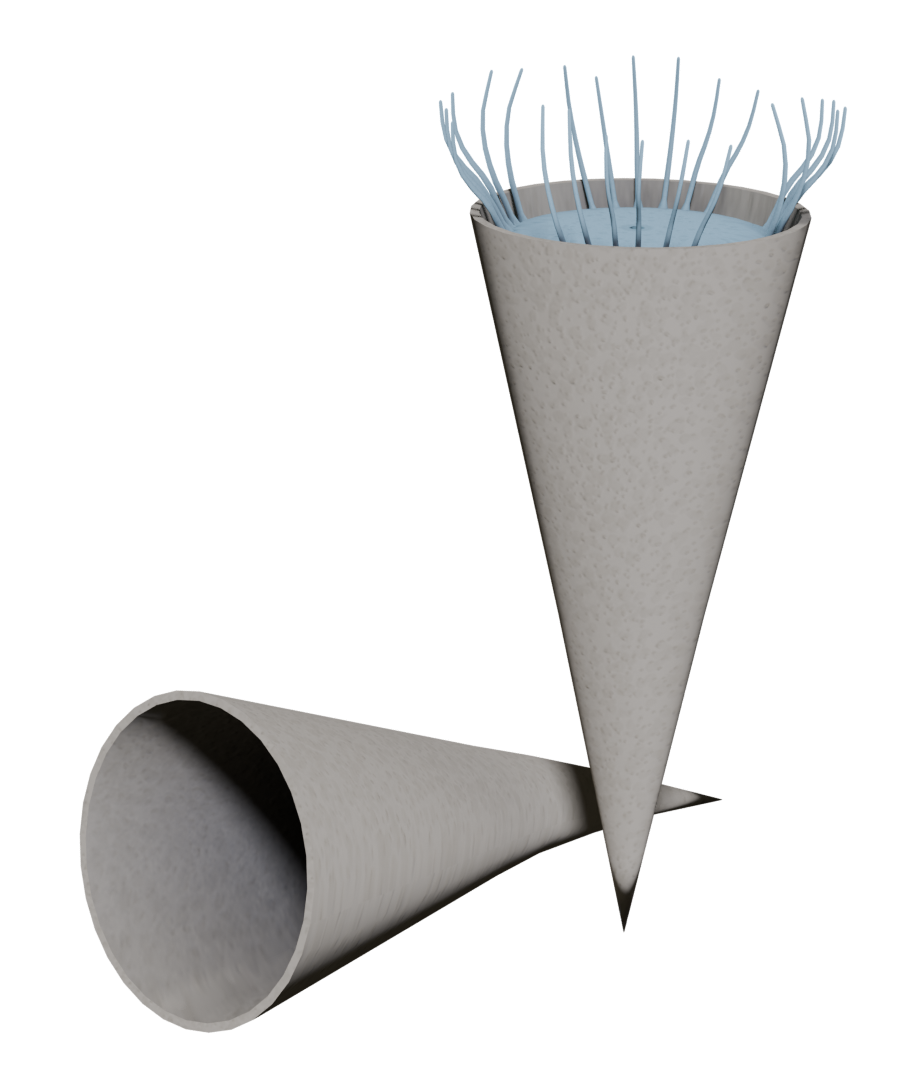
- 3D reconstruction of Protoconites minor, with soft parts based on possible cnidarian affinity

Scientific classification
- Kingdom: Animalia
- Phylum: Cnidaria
- Genus: †Protoconites; Chen, Xiao, and Yuan, 1994
- Species: †P. minor

Binomial name
- †Protoconites minor Chen, Xiao, and Yuan, 1994

= Protoconites =

Protoconites Temporal range: Ediacaran - Cambrian 620–529 Ma

Conical Ediacaran organism

Protoconites is an extinct animal from the Ediacaran and early Cambrian of China with possible affinities to Cnidaria. Specimens are conical in shape, and range from being straight to curved, and is a monotypic genus, containing only Protoconites minor.

== Discovery ==
The fossil material of Protoconites was found from the Miaohe area of the Doushantuo Formation, Three Gorges, South China in 1994, and described within the same year.

== Description ==
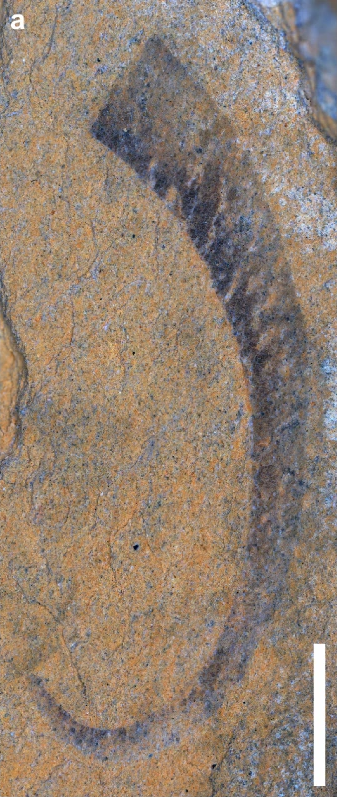
Protoconties minor from the Dengying Formation

Protoconites minor is a conical organism, growing up to 50 mm (2.0 in) in length, and are smooth in overall appearance. The base of the cone is squared-off, and ranges from 0.2–0.4 mm (0.0–0.0 in) in width, going up to 1–7 mm (0.0–0.3 in) at the top. Whilst most specimens are preserved fully straight, a lot of specimens are also preserved with a notable curve, ranging from 13 to 25 degrees.

Protoconites has been postured to have affinities with Cnidaria, bearing similarities to Cambrorhytium, a conularid cnidarian from the early Cambrian, although Cambrorhytium is much larger than Protoconites. They also differ by the fact that whilst Cambrorhytium has small tentacle-like structures and annulations, whilst Protoconites does not. This is also the same for other tubular forms like the Cambrian aged Archotuba, the Ediacaran aged Lantianella and Piyuania, which all bear annulations and tentacle-like structures, although the overall similar morphologies shows a possible phylogenetic relationship.

== Distribution ==
Protoconites has only been found within China, and is known from the late Ediacaran aged strata of the Doushantuo and Dengying Formations, and the Ediacaran-Cambrian aged Yanjiahe Formation. Fossils have also been found nearer to the base of the Doushantuo in the Ancanping Section, which have been dated to roughly 620 - 610 Ma, thus making Protoconites and other known macrofossils from the Ancanping assemblage older than the previously known macrofossil assemblage that was the Lantian Biota at 602 Ma.

== See also ==
- List of Ediacaran genera
