= Konglingiphyton =

Konglingiphyton Temporal range: late Cryogenian – early Cambrian ~650–529 Ma
- Konglingiphyton erecta from the Ancanping assemblage of the Doushantuo Formation

Scientific classification
- Domain: Eukaryota
- Supergroup: Archaeplastida
- Division: Rhodophyta (?)
- Genus: †Konglingiphyton; Chen et Xiao, 1992 (emend., nom. corr. Xiao et al., 2002)

Type species
- † Konglingiphyton erecta Chen et Xiao, 1992 (emend., nom. corr. Xiao et al., 2002)

Other species
- †Konglingiphyton (?) laterale Ye, 2019

Synonyms
- Konglingiphyton; Palaeoscinaia Hu in Ding et al., 1996; Ramalga Hu in Ding et al., 1996; K. erecta; Palaeocodium perelegans Hu in Ding et al., 1996; Palaeoscinaia ramulosa Hu in Ding et al., 1996; Palaeoscinaia constricta Hu in Ding et al., 1996; Konglingiphyton regularum Hu in Ding et al., 1996; Tubulalga (?) minuta Hu in Ding et al., 1996; Furcatalga (?) sinuosa Hu in Ding et al., 1996

Extinct genus of a probable Rhodophyta algae

Konglingiphyton is an extinct genus of macro-algae fossil from the late Cryogenian to early Cambrian of South China. It is a ribbon-like branching algal fossil, with probable affinities to the Rhodophyta. It contains two species, K. erecta and K. (?) laterale.

== Discovery and naming ==
Fossils of Konglingiphyton erecta were first found in the Miaohe section in the Doushantuo Formation in Zigui County, Hubei Province of South China, and were formally described and named in 1992. Fossils of the second pontential species, K. (?) laterale, were also found in the Miaohe section of the Doushantuo Formation, being formally descrbied and named in 2019.

The specific name of K. (?) laterale derives direcrly from the Latin word "lateralis", to mean "lateral", in reference to the asymmetrical branching of the species.

== Description ==
A line drawing of K. erecta from Miaohe by Steiner (1994)

Konglingiphyton is a small, ribbon-like macro-algae, with dichotomous branching. The branches taper outwards distally, ranging between 0.1–1.4 mm (0.004–0.055 in) in width. The overall length of the thallus ranges between 2.3–36.8 mm (0.1–1.4 in). Newer material has been found preserved with rhiozodal holdfast structures, with filaments up to 1.5 mm (0 in) in length and 0.07–0.2 mm (0.0028–0.0079 in) in width.

== Taphonomy ==
Konglingiphyton are commonly preserved with a rusty colour in the Doushantuo Formation, which is suggested to be due to the oxidation of pyrite in the fossils, which would have likely been cast or coated in the mineral, giving some parts of the fossils three-dimensional preservation, as well as sparse organic remains. Although, it is noted that other fossils from other sections of the formations are less influenced by pyrite mineralisation, thus presenting as range of preservation mods akin to the Burgess Shale, Chengjiang and Fezuouata biotas.

== Affinities ==
In 1999, Yuan et al. would describe Konglingiphyton from the Lantian Formation, and regarded it as a form of eukaryotic algae, although placement within a higher taxonomic level was precluded, with Konglingiphyton and other Lantian biota taxa either being Chlorophyta, Rhodophyta, or Phaeophyta based on their overall morphology. The placement as a eukaryotic algae has been supported since, with Xiao et al. in 2002 going further with a tenative placement to the Rhodophyta based on its gross morphogical similarities to the extant rhodophyte genera Pseudogloiophloea, Scinaia, and Galaxaura.

== Taxonomic history ==
Fossil of Konglingiphyton from the Miaohe biota of the Doushantuo Formation

Konglingiphyton has a notable taxonomic history, with some described genera and species being synonymised into it when Xiao et al. emended its description in 2002. Palaeoscinaia and Ramalga, both described in Ding et al. in 1996, were noted to fit the new emended description of Konglingiphyton quite well. It was argued that Palaeoscinaia differed from Konglingiphyton in the number of branches, although Xiao et al. would note this was likely due to post-mortem fragmentation. For Ramalga, it was realised that its irregular branches were the result of a superimposed thallus of a Doushantuophyton specimen overtop. On the species level, Palaeoscinaia constricta, Palaeoscinaia ramulosa, and Ramalga sparsula are regarded as junior synonyms based on the previously noted issues raised. Konglingiphyton regularum is mentioned to only be described from a singular specimen which preserved a holdfast, which was noted to not warrant a distinctive species. Specimens assigned to Palaeocodium perelegans, alongside poorly preserved specimens described as Tubulalga minuta and Furcatalga sinuosa, are all noted to be within the circumscription of Konglingiphyton erecta.

=== Species ===
Konglingiphyton currently contains three valid species and three synonymised genera, which are as follows :

Species	Authority	Location	Status	Notes	Refs
Konglingiphyton erecta	Chen et Xiao, 1992	China	valid	(Note: Type species. Description emended in 2002 by Xiao et al.)	
Konglingiphyton regularum	Ding et al., 1996	China	synonymised	(Note: Synonymised into K. erecta due to a lack of distinctive features)	
Konglingiphyton (?) laterale	Ye et al. 2019	China	tentative	(Note: Tentative placement to Konglingiphyton due to its assymertical branching)	

== Distribution ==
Konglingiphyton is predominately known from the Ediacaran of China, being found in the Lantian Formation, the Miaohe biota in the Doushantuo Formation.

Konglingiphyton has also been found within the late Cryogenian aged Nantuo Formation, being a member of the "Songluo biota" some ~650 Ma during the Marinoan glaciation. A tentative record of Konglingiphyton has also been found in younger the Cambrian layers of the Yanjiahe Formation in China.
