= Qianchuania =

Qianchuania Temporal range: Early Ediacaran ~602 Ma
- Reconstruction of Qianchuania fusiformis

Scientific classification
- Kingdom: Animalia
- Phylum: Cnidaria (?)
- Genus: †Qianchuania; Wan et al., 2016

Type species
- † Qianchuania fusiformis Wan et al., 2016

Extinct genus of cnidarian-grade spindle-shaped fossils

Qianchuania is an extinct, enigmatic fossil from the early Ediacaran, and was alive around 602 Ma in the Lantian Formation. It has an slender, spindle-shaped body, and is regarded as a putative cnidarian-grade organism. It is a monotypic genus, containing only Qianchuania fusiformis.

== Discovery and naming ==
Fossils of Qianchuania were first found and reported from the black shale "Member II" of the Lantian Formation in Xiuning County, Anhui Province of South China in 2011 as "Type B", and which were formally described and named in 2016.

The generic name Qianchuania derives from the place name of Qianchuan, a town near to where the fossils were found. The specific name fusiformis derives directly from the Latin word of the same spelling, "fusiformis", in reference to the spindle-shaped morphology appearance of the fossils.

== Description ==
Qianchuania cyathiformis are centimetre-scale, slender spindle-shaped fossils, and is rarely preserved with a holdfast structure. The main body is composed of a fusiform outer integument, with a narrower fusiform inner structure, and which has a finger-like ribbon extending from the distal end. The overall height of the body ranges between 20–60 mm (0.8–2.4 in), whilst it ranges between 3–6 mm (0.12–0.24 in) in width. The inner structure is darker than the outer integument, and due to the highly carbonised nature of the fossils of Qianchuania, it is difficult to ascertain whether longitudinal filaments are present, with only faint hints being seen. The finger-like ribbon extending out from the top of the organism reaches up to 7–15 mm (0.28–0.59 in) in length and 1–1.5 mm (0.039–0.059 in) in width.

== Affinities ==
When the fossils were first reported by Yuan et al. in 2011, they had designated fossils of Qianchuania as "Type B", and regarded it as being similar to "Type A", now Lantianella, except for the singular tentacle-like ribbon. Wan et al. also noted in the formal description of Qianchuania that the presence of an outer integument is similar to what is seen in Piyuania. However, they further noted that the overall spindle-shaped morphology of Qianchuania sees it considerably thinner than either Lantianella or Piyuania, and was thus regarded as a distinct genus, although it may have phylogenic affinities with the two aforementioned taxa. Qianchuania itself is cnidarian-grade organism due to the presence of its outer integument, which has been compared to the hydrotheca of known cnidarians.

Some researchers have also regarded Qianchuania, and the rest of the putative cnidarians, as algal fossils, due to the fact that the basis of the cnidarian-grade affinity is predominately based on the gross morphology of the fossil material.

== See also ==
- List of Ediacaran genera
