= Nantuo Formation =

Geologic formation in Hubei Province, China

- Stratigraphic range: late Cryogenian; ~650–635 Ma
- Systematic reconstruction of the Songluo Biota
- Type: Geological formation
- Sub-units: See: Members
- Underlies: Miaohe, Nantuo, and Shennongjia; Doushantuo Formation; Wangjiawan; Lunasi Formation
- Overlies: Miaohe & Nantuo; (Contact unknown) Liantuo Formation; Wangjiawan; (Unconformably ?) Chengjiang Formation; Shennongjia; Datangpo Formation; (Unconformably) Shennongjia Group; (Unconformably) Macaoyuan Group; (Unconformably) Liantuo Formation
- Thickness: 300 m (980 ft)

Lithology
- Primary: Tillite
- Other: Shale, Schist, Granite, Siltstone, Sandstone, Diamictite

Location
- Region: Hubei
- Country: China

The Nantuo Formation is a Cryogenian aged geologic formation in Zigui County, Hubei Province of South China. The formation contains the Songluo Biota, a collection of large macro-algae fossils dated to around 650 Ma during a notably short break in the Marinoan glaciation. The Songluo Biota is currently the only known macrofossil biota from the Cryogenian.

== Geology ==
The stratigraphy of Neoprotozoic rocks in the Miaohe region

Due to the large area that the Nantuo Formation covers, the geology within the formation differs from town to town within the Hubei Province. These different outcrops are listed below, under the respective regions or towns they are found in or near to:

=== Miaohe Outcrop ===
The Nantuo Formation can be found outcropping along the western edge of the Huangling Anticline in Hubei Province in South China near to the village of Miaohe, where it is overlain by the Ediacaran-aged shale rocks of the Doushantuo Formation, whilst it is underlain by the quartz sandstones of the Liantuo Formation, although the contact point between the Nantuo and Liantuo Formations remains unknown as they are not exposed. The Nantuo Formation here is predominately composed of greenish tillite, roughly 100 m (330 ft) in thickness. Within the tillite can be found a varying range of rock fragments, from rounded to angular, all composed of schist and granite.

=== Wangjiawan Outcrop ===
The formation can also be found outcropping near the village of Wangjiawan, where it is overlain by the sandstones rocks of the Lunasi Formation, whilst is it potentially unconformably underlain by the conglomerate rocks of the Chengjiang Formation, although the contact point is not easy to locate. The formation at Wangjoawan is considerably thinner, only attaining a thickness of roughly 27 m (89 ft). The lower 10 m (33 ft) are still composed of the greenish tillite, whilst the upper 17 m (56 ft) are instead composed of red shales.

=== Shennongjia Outcrop ===
The formation is also known to outcrop in the Shennongjia area, although this outcrop is noted to have not been well studied as others until recently. Here, the formation is again overlain by the Doushantuo Formation, although this time it is underlain by the Datangpo Formation at the town of Dajiuhu, unconformably underlain by the Shennongjia and Macaoyuan Groups at the town of Songbai and the Macaoyuan region respectively, whilst in the Three Gorges region it is unconformably underlain by the Liantuo Formation. The formation here attains its greatest thickness, coming in at around 300 m (980 ft), and here it is predominately composed of dark orange, massive glacial diamictites beds up to 150 m (490 ft) thick, dolostone dominated clast conglomerates, lonestone-bearing sandstones, yellowish-green siltstone, and black shales which are fossiliferous in nature.

=== Nantuo Outcrop ===
The Nantuo Formation can also be found outcropping near to Nantuo village, where it is overlain and underlain by the same formations seen at Miaohe, but shows a similar thickness to the Wangjiwan outcrop, coming in at 26 m (85 ft). Here, there can also be found three distinctive members, the basal Gucheng Tillite, the middle Datangpo Member which is composed of dark siltstones, shales and limestones, and then upper Nantuo Tillite found throughout all known outcrops.

== Dating ==
Biostratigraphic correlation table of Neoproterozoic formations in South Anhui and Hubei, China, including the Nantuo Formation

Prior to proper dating, the Nantuo Formation had been correlated with the Leigongwu Formation in Anhui Province. Since then, more refined dates have been yielded using radiometric dating, which recovered an age range of 650 - 635 Ma for the Nantuo Formation, which thus places the entire formation within the Marinoan glaciation that occurred at the end of the Cryogenian.

== Taphonomy ==
The fossils of the Nantuo Formation are preserved as carbonaceous films, similar to a Burgess Shale type preservation style.

== Paleoenvironment ==
The overall environments of the Nantuo Formation at the time of deposition were likely to have been ice-proximal glaciomarine to subglacial, with some layers showing a distal glaciomarine environment brought on by icebergs and turbidity currents, all of which has been inferred by the presence of the massive diamictites, conglomerates, and sandstones of the Shennongjia region. Meanwhile, the Songluo Biota was notably deposited with no signs of glacial activity, inferred from the shales and siltstones, with the area likely being deposited on a distal shelf area away from the margins of the large ice sheets of the late Cryogenian.

== Paleobiota ==
The Nantuo Formation is home to the Songluo Biota, which, whilst it is less diverse than fossil assemblages that came before and after, is notable in that it is currently the only macro-algae assemblage known from the Cryogenian. It shows that even though macro-algae likely suffered a substantial extinction worldwide during the major glacial periods of the Cryogenian, they managed to persist even at less diverse numbers, further helped by short but vitally importance appearances of open-marine environments during the Marinoan Glaciation. The biota is found within the Shennongjia outcrops of the formation, and is composed of relatively simple macro-algae forms, such as the filamentous Vendotaenids.

Color key: Taxon / Reclassified taxon / Taxon falsely reported as present / Dubious taxon or junior synonym / Ichnotaxon / Ootaxon / Morphotaxon

Notes
Uncertain or tentative taxa are in small text
~~crossed out~~ taxa are discredited.

=== Algae ===
Genus	Species	Notes	Images
Chuaria	Chuaria sp.	Enigmatic fossil, possibly synonymous with Tawuia.	Chuaria from the younger Ancanping assemblage of the Doushantuo Formation
Doushantuophyton (?)	Doushantuophyton (?) sp.	Branching macroalgae. Placement with Doushantuophyton is tentative.	Doushantuophyton lineare from the younger Ancanping assemblage of the Doushantuo Formation
Baculiphyca	Baculiphyca sp.	Macroalgae.	Baculiphyca taeniata from the Tongshan Lagerstätte, Dengying Formation, China
Enteromorphites	E. siniansis; Enteromorphites sp.	Macroalgae.	Enteromorphites siniansis from the younger Ancanping assemblage of the Doushantuo Formation
Konglingiphyton	K. erecta	Macroalgae.	Konglingiphyton erecta from the younger Ancanping assemblage of the Doushantuo Formation
Vendotaenia	Vendotaenia sp.	Ribbon-like macroalgae.	
Parallelphyton-like form	???	Macroalgae, with a similar appearance to Parallelphyton	
Wenghuiphyton-like form	???	Macroalgae, with a similar appearance to Wenghuiphyton	

== See also ==
- Doushantuo Formation – Macrofossil-bearing formation spanning almost the whole Ediacaran
- Lantian Formation – Macrofossil-bearing formation in the early Ediacaran
