= Doushantuophyton =

Doushantuophyton Temporal range: Ediacaran ~620–539 Ma (Tentative records from the Nantuo Formation)
- Line drawing reconstruction of the holotype specimen of Doushantuophyton lineare from the Doushantuo Formation

Scientific classification
- Domain: Eukaryota
- Supergroup: Archaeplastida
- Division: Rhodophyta (?)
- Genus: †Doushantuophyton; Steiner, 1994

Type species
- † Doushantuophyton lineare Steiner, 1994

Species
- † D. lineare Steiner, 1994; † D. rigidulum Steiner, 1994; † D. cometa Yuan, Li et Cao, 1999; † D. quyuani Xiao et al., 2002; † D. ? laticladus Ye et al., 2002

Synonyms
- D. rigidulum; Lantiania nematoformis Bi et al., 1987 (nomen illegitimum); Lantiania grossus Yan et al., 1992; D. quyuani; Archaeocladiphton quyuani Chen, Xiao et Yuan, 1994; Archaeocladiphton jinyugani Chen, Xiao et Yuan, 1994 (nomen nudem); Archaeocladiphton dendriticum Ding et al., 1994

Extinct genus of Ediacaran Macro-algae

Doushantuophyton is an extinct macro-algae fossil from the Ediacaran of Asia. It is a small, branching fossil, with probable affinities to the Rhodophyta. There are also tentative records from upper Cryogenian rocks.

== Discovery and naming ==
Fossils of Doushantuophyton were first found from the Miaohe biota of the upper Doushantuo Formation in Hubei, China in 1991, and although it was named, it had not been properly described, thus making it a nomen nudem, or "naked name". It would finally be formally described, and thus formally named, in 1994.

The generic name Doushantuophyton, as well as the specific names lineare and rigidulum were retained from the original invalid descriptions, in honour of the contributions Chinese scientists have made in their studies on Neoproterozoic macro-algae from the Miaohe and Lantian biotas. The specific name for D. cometa derives directly from the Latin word "cometa", to mean "comet", referring to its overall shape. The specific name of D. laticladus derives from the Latin words "lati-", to mean "wide"; and "cladus", to mean "branch", in reference to its notably wide branches.

== Description ==
Doushantuophyton is described as a bushy, branching macro-algae fossil, commonly with notably slender and fragile looking branches. Specimens from the Doushantuo formation have branches attaining a length of 1–12 mm (0.04–0.47 in), whilst Lantian Formation specimens attain a length of 7.5–10 mm (0.30–0.39 in). Fossils are commonly found incomplete and fragmented, with branches ending in stark fracture points, and very rarely can be found with potential rounded to spatulate distal terminations on some branches. There are five species with notable differences in overall morphology, which are as follows:

Line drawing reconstruction of Doushantuophyton rigidulum from the Lantian Formation

=== Doushantuophyton linaere ===
D. linaere specimens bear multiple successions of dichotomous branching, with the branches being notably slender and delicate, attaining a width between 40–200 μm (0.0016–0.0079 in). These branches are spaced from each other by 0.3–1.9 mm (0.012–0.075 in), although the holotype has a spacing of 3.3 mm (0.13 in). The overall thallus length ranges between 1.2–27.3 mm (0.05–1.07 in). Discoidal to rhizoidal holdfasts are rarely preserved.

=== Doushantuophyon rigidulum ===
D. rigidulum specimens have considerably fewer successive branches, which rise from a main axis, and are notably more rigid and straight. The spacing of branches in D. rigidulum is thus notably larger, ranging from 0.8–9.5 mm (0.03–0.37 in). The overall thallus length is 2.4 cm (1 in). This overall larger size and differing branch construction has raised concerns over its placement within Doushantuophyton, although it is kept within the genus due to lack of similar fossils outside of Doushantuophyton.

=== Doushantuophyton cometa ===
D. cometa specimens are comet to broom-like in appearance, composed of between 30-50 dichotomous branches, which are notably flexible. The branches range between 12–15 mm (0–1 in) in length, and 0.1 mm (0.0039 in) in width. The species was noted to preserve a holdfast in some specimens, although a later study discounted this.

=== Doushantuophyton quyuani ===
D. quyuani specimens bear pseudomonopodial branching thallus, with 12 dichotomous unequal branches. The main axis is either zig-zagged in shape, or nearly straight, and ranges between 0.03–0.2 mm (0.001–0.008 in) in width. Branches are commonly straight and smooth, and notably rarely branch any further, and are a similar width to the main branch. The overall thallus length is 25.6 mm (1 in).

=== Doushantuophyton (?) laticladus ===
D. ? laticladus specimens bear pseudomonopodial branching thallus, with three dichotomous branches. The main axis is slightly zig-zagged in appearance, and is 0.1 mm (0.004 in) in width. Branches are straight and smooth, and do not branch any further, and can get considerably wider than the main branch, getting up to 0.5 mm (0.020 in) in width distally. The overall thallus length is 6.2 mm (0.24 in). The notably widening branches of D. ? laticladus make its assignment to this genus tentative, as one of the main diagnostic features of Doushantuophyton are the thin, slender branches. Although assignment to similar genera such as Konglingiphyon are precluded due to the differing branching pattern, and Konglingphyton's even wider branches.

== Affinities ==
When formally described, it was noted that the dichotomous branching seen in Doushantuophyton was similar to what is seen in extant rhodophytes, or red algae, being compared to Polyides rotunda. It has also been noted to likely bear biological affinities to the Cambrian rhodophyte fossil Wahpia insolens, although Wahpia bears much broader branching, with these branches also occurring from a broader main axis. It was thus assigned to the division Rhodophyta, although only tentatively, as it lacks several important diagnostic features.

== Palaeoecology ==
Doushantuophyton likely lived as an upright, benthic macro-algae in life, inferred from specimens up to 3 mm (0.1 in) in length being attached to sediment particles.

== Distribution ==
Doushantuophyton is predominately known from China, being found in its namesake of the Doushantuo Formation, whilst it is also found in the Lantian and Dengying Formations also in China. It has also been found outside of China, in the Starorusskaya Formation in Russia. There have also been found tentative records of Doushantuophyton in the upper Cryogenian rocks of the Nantuo Formation in Central China, alongside other macrofossils of the Songluo Biota.

== Taxonomy ==
Doushantuophyton currently contains four valid species, one tentative species, and two synonymized genera, which are as follows, after Ye et al., 2019 unless specified:

Species	Authority	Location	Status	Notes	Refs
Doushantuophyton lineare	Steiner, 1994	China	valid	(Note: Doushantuophyton lineare was originally named in 1991 by Chen in Chen et Xiao, although the description was invalid, thus making it nomen nudem until Steiner validated the genus and species in 1994)	
Doushantuophyton rigidulum	Steiner, 1994	China	valid	(Note: Doushantuophyton rigidulum was originally named in 1994 by Chen in Chen, Li et Xiao, although the description was invalid, thus making it nomen nudem until Steiner validated the species later in the same year alongside D. linaere)	
Doushantuophyton cometa	Yuan, Li et Cao, 1999	China	valid		
Doushantuophyton quyuani	Xiao et al., 2002	China	valid		
Doushantuophyton (?) laticladus	Ye et al., 2019	China	uncertain	(Note: The morphology is D. ? laticladus's branches differ greatly to what is seen in other species of Doushantuophyton, thus the assignment to the genus is tentative)	
Archaeocladiphton quyuani	Chen, Xiao et Yuan, 1994	China	invalid	synonym of D. quyuani	
Archaeocladiphton dendriticum	Chen, Xiao et Yuan, 1994	China	invalid	nomen nudem applied to A. quyuani	
Archaeocladiphton dendriticum	Ding et al., 1996	China	invalid	synonym of D. quyuani	
Lantiania nematoformis	Bi et al., 1987	China	invalid	nomen illegitimum of D. rigidulum	
Lantiania grossus	Yan et al., 1992	China	invalid	synonym of D. rigidulum	
