= Hirnant Limestone =

Geologial formation in United Kingdom

- Stratigraphic range: Hirnantian; ~446–444 Ma
- Type: Formation

Lithology
- Primary: Limestone

Location
- Coordinates: 52.9°N 3.6°W
- Approximate paleocoordinates: 38.1°S 16.9°W
- Country: England, Wales
- Hirnant Limestone (the United Kingdom) Hirnant Limestone (Wales)

The Hirnant Limestone is an old name for a geologic formation in England and Wales, defining the Hirnantian. It preserves fossils dating back to the Ordovician period. It is now classified as the Hirnant Limestone Member of the Foel Y Ddinas Mudstones Formation.

== See also ==
- List of fossiliferous stratigraphic units in Wales
