= Mezenia =

Mezenia Temporal range: Ediacaran, 560–551 Ma

Scientific classification
- Kingdom: Incertae sedis
- Genus: †Mezenia; Sokolov, 1976
- Species: †M. kossovoyi

Binomial name
- †Mezenia kossovoyi Sokolov, 1976

Extinct genus of algae

Mezenia is a genus of macroalgae described by Boris Sokolov in 1976. Mezenia lived in Eurasia during the Ediacaran between 560 and 551 Ma.

== Description ==
Mezenia kossovoyi, the only described species, was described by Boris Sokolov in 1976.

The original Mezenia specimen was described as sausage shaped, and 5–6 mm wide. Subsequent specimens were described as smooth, 6mm wide ribbons. Most specimens are incomplete, missing one end.

== Distribution ==
Mezenia kossovoyi specimens are found in the Khatyspyt Formation, the Perevalok Formation, and the Lyamatsa Formation, all of which are in Russia. The Khatyspyt Formation is in northern Siberia, the Perevalok Formation is on the western slope of the Central Ural Mountains, and the Lyamatsa Formation is in the White Sea area.

== Taphonomy ==
Mezenia kossovoyi has been preserved as carbonaceous compressions in mudstone. Specimens from the Lyamatsa formation had longitudinal and transverse wrinkles created during burial on their otherwise smooth surfaces.

== See also ==
- List of Ediacaran genera
