= Leigongwu Formation =

Geologic formation in Anhui Province, China

- Stratigraphic range: late Cryogenian; ~649 Ma
- Type: Geological formation
- Underlies: South Anhui; Lantian Formation; North-east Jiangxi, and West Zhejiang; Xifengsi Formation; Doushantuo Formation
- Overlies: South Anhui; Xiuning Formation; North-east Jiangxi, and West Zhejiang; Zhitang Formation
- Thickness: 40 m (130 ft)

Lithology
- Primary: Diamictite
- Other: Tuff, Mudstone, Tillite

Location
- Coordinates: 28.50°N 118.38°E
- Approximate paleocoordinates: 14°N 150°E
- Region: Anhui, Jiangxi, and Zhejiang
- Country: China

The Leigongwu Formation is a late Cryogenian aged geologic formation in China. Due to the paucity of zircon-bearing rocks in the formation, it is difficult to constrain the date of deposition for the formation, although some samples were found and taken from the base, which yielded a date of 649 Ma, meaning the formation was deposited during the Marinoan glaciation. Tillites in the formation also contain magnetic minerals, permitting researchers to recover a paleolatitude of 14° N.

== Geology ==
The stratigraphy of Neoproterozoic rocks in the Piyuan region

The Leigongwu Formation can be found outcropping in Xiuning County, Anhui Province in south China, being conformably overlain by the Ediacaran aged dolostones of the Lantian Formation, whilst it is underlain by the conglomerate rocks Xiuning Formation. It can also be found outcropping in north-western Jiangxi Province and west Zhejiang Province, where it is overlain conformably both by the Ediacaran aged Xifengsi and Doushantuo Formations, and it is conformably underlain by the Zhitang Formation. The formation itself is predominately composed of thick, fine-grained, green-gray glacial diamictites, as well as gravel-bearing tuffs and tuffaceous mudstone. The diamictites contain clasts usually less than 5 cm (2.0 in) in diameter. Tillites have also been found in the Zhejiang section of the formation, which is composed of large, irregularly-shaped pebbles, whilst the surface of the tillite is grey-purplish red in colour. The pebbles themselves range from sandstone, to tuffaceous sandstone, grey-black siliceous rocks, white quartzite, and igneous rocks. They range from less than 1 cm (0.39 in) in diameter to over 1 m (3 ft 3 in), with the average range falling between 10–70 cm (3.9–27.6 in), are cemented together with clay minerals.

=== Glacial deposits ===
The glacial origin of the Leigongwu Formation has predominately been inferred from the presence of bed-penetrating dropstones with notable impact margins, as well as the aforementioned clasts, which can be found in laminated beds. From this, the formation was first regarded as a single glacial unit, although in 1993, Zhang et al. found a thin layer of clastic rock without gravel, thus inferring it as an inter-glacial layer. Alongside this, later studies would find Manganese-bearing carbonate rocks in the middle of the formation also. All of this would be consistent with two glacial units instead of one, although a study published in 2012 by Guan et al., which saw the study of four Neoproterozoic sections in Anhui, which included the Leigongwu Formation, noted that there was no evidence of any inter-glacial successions or cap carbonates within the formation, and that the aforementioned carbonate rocks are the result of fault repetition. In 2015, Cui et al. would regard the formation as a single glacial unit, inferred from dating samples collected from the base of the formation and the prior study done in by Guan et al. in 2012.

== Paleolatitude ==
The paleolatitude of the Leigongwu Formation has been inferred from the tillites found in the Zhejiang section, which contain magnetic minerals, namely magnetite and haematite. From these samples, coordinates of 124.4° and 25.6° were recovered in the geographic coordinate system, which correlation to 126.1° and 21° in the stratigraphic coordinate system, thus seeing the corresponding paleolatitude recovered to be 14° N, supporting prior studies done on the paleolatitude of the Doushantuo Formation, and further constraining the paleolatitude of the South China Plate to between 10°–30° during the Neoproterozoic.

== Dating ==
Biostratigraphic correlation table of Neoproterozoic formations in South Anhui and Hubei, China, including the Leigongwu Formation

The Leigongwu Formation has commonly been correlated to the Nantuo Formation, primarily due to the glacial deposits that can be found in both formations, seeing it placed at the very end of the Cryogenian period around 635 Ma. Later studies attempted to constrain the exact deposition of the formation using U-Pb dating, although due to the paucity of the zircon-bearing rocks in the formation, and thus the lack of usable zircon samples, this was notably difficult to do. Although zircon samples were found near the base of the formation, which yielded a date of 649 Ma, which would placed it within the Marinoan glaciation of the late Cryogenian.
