= Huangshanophyton =

Huangshanophyton Temporal range: Ediacaran ~602–551 Ma
- Fossil material of Huangshanophyton fluticulosum in the Anhui Geological Museum

Scientific classification
- Domain: Eukaryota
- Supergroup: Archaeplastida
- Genus: †Huangshanophyton; Chen, Lu et Xiao, 1994

Type species
- † Huangshanophyton fluticulosum Chen, Lu et Xiao, 1994

Synonyms
- Flabelliphyton formosus Yan et al. 1992 (nomen nudem); Huangshanophyton caoi Chen, Lu et Xiao, 1994

Extinct species of enigmatic alga

Huangshanophyton is an extinct genus of macro-algae fossil from the Ediacaran of South China. It is a small, fan-shaped algal fossil, although its affinities remain unknown. It is a monotypic genus, containing only the species H. fluticulosum.

== Discovery and naming ==
Fossils of Huangshanophyton were first found in the Lantian Formation of Xiuning County, Anhui Province of South China in 1994, and although it was named, Michael Steiner suggested it had not been properly described, thus making it a nomen nudem, or "naked name". Steiner would synonymize it with Anhuiphyton in the same year. In 1999, the original description of Anhuiphyton would be emended, overriding Steiner's synonymization of Huangshanophyton in the process.

The generic name Huangshanophyton derives from the place name "Huangshan", in reference to where it was found, and the Greek word "phyton", to mean "plant". The specific name fluticulosum derives from the Latin word "flucticulus", to mean "wave/billow".

== Description ==
Huangshanophyton fluticulosum is a small fan-shaped macro-algae, with filaments numbering between 45 – 50. The filaments are relatively straight with no branching present, and range from 0.1–0.3 mm (0.004–0.012 in) in width and 10–20 mm (0.4–0.8 in) in length.

== Affinities ==
In 1994, the same year Huangshanophyton would be described, Steiner regarded the description and material as invalid, making it a nomen nudem. He would see it synonymized with Anhuiphyton in the same year. In 1999, Yuan et al. would reject what Steiner had done, noting that the descriptions made in Chen, Lu et Xiao in 1994 were understandable, and the holotypes clearly stated. Thus, they would instead suggest an emendation for Anhuiphyton instead of an outright replacement, which as such saw Huangshanophyton valid again, with it being noted that it differed from Anhuiphyton in the considerably smaller number of filaments it had, where Anhuiphyton has over 1000 filaments. H. caoi, also described in 1994 by Chen, Lu et Xiao, was noted to be very similar to the type specimen of H. fluticulosum, suggesting it to be the result of taphonomic processes, and synonmized it as such. Flabelliphyton formosus would also be synonymized into Huangshanophyton due to the lack of a holotype fossil.

Yuan et al. would also regard Huangshanophyton as a form of eukaryotic algae, although placement within a higher taxonomic level was precluded, with Huangshanophyton and other Lantian biota taxa either being Chlorophyta, Rhodophyta, or Phaeophyta based on their overall morphology. The placement as a eukaryotic algae has been supported since, with no further assignment to higher taxonomic levels.

== Distribution ==
Huangshanophyton is only known from the Lantian Formation, and is one of the dominant forms of the Lantian Biota.

== See also ==
- Anhuiphyton
