= Enteromorphites =

Enteromorphites Temporal range: late Cryogenian – early Cambrian ~650–518 Ma
- Enteromorphites siniansis from the Ancanping assemblage of the Doushantuo Formation

Scientific classification
- Domain: Eukaryota
- Supergroup: Archaeplastida
- Clade: Viridiplantae
- Division: Chlorophyta
- Class: Ulvophyceae
- Order: Ulvales
- Family: Ulvaceae
- Genus: †Enteromorphites; Zhu et Chen, 1984 (emend., nom. corr. Xiao et al., 2002)

Type species
- † Enteromorphites siniansis Zhu et Chen, 1984 (emend., nom. corr. Xiao et al., 2002)

Other species
- †Enteromorphites intestinalis Xu, 2001; †Enteromorphites magnus Ye et al., 2019

Synonyms
- Enteromorphites; Yemaomianiphyton Chen et Xiao, 1992; Lanlingxiphyton Chen et Xiao, 1992; Zhongbaodaophyton Chen, Xiao, et Yuan, 1994; Capilliphyca Yuan, Li et Chen, 1995; Gymnogongrusoides Hu in Ding et al., 1996; Yichangella Hu in Ding et al., 1996; Polycladalga Hu in Ding et al., 1996; E. siniansis; Yemaomianiphyton bifurcatum Chen et Xiao, 1992; Lanlingxiphyton formosa Chen et Xiao, 1992; Zhongbaodaophyton crassa Chen, Xiao, et Yuan, 1994; Z. palmatum Hu in Ding et al., 1996; Capilliphyca felxa Yuan, Li et Chen, 1995; Palaeocodium yichangicum Hu in Ding et al., 1996; Enteromorphites flexuosus Hu in Ding et al., 1996; E. compressus Hu in Ding et al., 1996; E. epicharis Hu in Ding et al., 1996; Gymnogongrusoides regularis Hu in Ding et al., 1996; G. irregularis Hu in Ding et al., 1996; G. erecta Hu in Ding et al., 1996; Polycladalga ramispina Hu in Ding et al., 1996

Extinct genus of Ulvaceae algae

Enteromorphites is an extinct genus of macro-algae fossil from the late Cryogenian to early Cambrian of South China, and Ediacaran of Australia. It is a elongate algal fossil, with its affinities likely being within the Ulvaceae. It contains three species, E. siniansis, E. magnus, and E. intestinalis.

== Discovery and naming ==
Fossils of Enteromorphites siniansis were first found in the Miaohe section in the Doushantuo Formation in Zigui County, Hubei Province of South China, and were formally described and named in 1984. Fossils of the second species, E. instetinalis, were found in the Yu'anshan Formation in the Maotianshan Shales, whilst fossils of the third species, E. magnus, were found in the Sanlihuang section of the Doushantuo Formation, and were described in 2019.

The generic name Enteromorphites derives from the old genus name of Enteromorpha (Note: Enteromorpha has since been synonymised into Ulva), in reference to the overall similar appearance to it. The specific name of E. magnus derives direcrly from the Latin word "magnus", to mean "large", in reference to the greater thickness of the branches compared to the types species. The specific name of E. intestinalis derives from the species name of Ulva intestinalis (Note: Then Enteromorpha instentinalis), due to the noted similarities between the fossil species and extant species.

== Description ==
A line drawing of E. siniansis from Miaohe by Steiner (1994)

Enteromorphites is a centimeter-scale macro-algae, with a elongate thallus. The thallus is composed of a central cylindrical axis in which branches dichotomously up to six times, with the body slightly tapering down to a discoidal holdfast structure. The central axis ranges between 0.3–2.1 mm (0.01–0.08 in) in width, which carries over to the branches. The overall length of the thallus ranges from 6 mm (0 in) up to 7.1 cm (3 in). The holdfast structure, which is rhiozodal in appearance, ranges between 0.5–1.0 cm (0–0 in) in diameter in the largest fossils.

== Taphonomy ==
Enteromorphites are commonly preserved with a rusty colour in the Doushantuo Formation, which is suggested to be due to the oxidation of pyrite in the fossils, which would have likely been cast or coated in the mineral, giving some parts of the fossils three-dimensional preservation, as well as sparse organic remains. Although, it is noted that other fossils from other sections of the formations are less influenced by pyrite mineralisation, thus presenting as range of preservation mods akin to the Burgess Shale, Chengjiang and Fezuouata biotas.

== Affinities ==
In 1999, Yuan et al. would describe Enteromorphites from the Lantian Formation, and regarded it as a form of eukaryotic algae, although placement within a higher taxonomic level was precluded, with Enteromorphites and other Lantian biota taxa either being Chlorophyta, Rhodophyta, or Phaeophyta based on their overall morphology. The placement as a eukaryotic algae has been supported since, although some researchers have seen it placed within the Chlorophyta, based on the already noted similarities to Ulva, seeing it placed within the family Ulvaceae.

== Taxonomic history ==
Enteromorphites has a varied taxonomic history, with multiple described genera and species being synonymised into it when Xiao et al. emended its description in 2002, alongside correcting its name also. When described in 1984, Zhu et Chen named it after Enteromorpha, although misspelled its original name as Enteromophites. Chen would use the correct spelling of Enteromorphites in subsequent publications, thus requiring Xiao et al. to formally correct the name in 2002, although some researchers have continued to misspell the name.

In terms of synonyms, the genus Yemaomianiphyton was regarded as incomplete specimens of Enteromorphites, whilst the genera Zhongbaodaophyton, Gymnogongrusoides, Yichangella, Polycladalga, and Capilliphyca were noted to fit the new emended description of Enteromorphites by Xiao et al. Multiple species erected by Hu in Ding et al. in 1996 under Enteromorphites from the Miaohe section were also noted to likely be the same population of E. siniansis which they were found amongst. Another species described as E. tubulosus by Hu in Ding et al. was noted by Xiao et al. to not bear any similarities to Enteromorphites, instead being composed of bundled filaments.

=== Species ===
Enteromorphites currently contains three valid species and three synonymised genera, which are as follows :

Species	Authority	Location	Status	Notes	Refs
Enteromorphites siniansis	Zhu et Chen, 1984	China	valid	(Note: Type species. Description emended in 2002 by Xiao et al.)	
Enteromorphites flexuosus	Hu in Ding et al., 1996	China	synonymised	(Note: Synonymised into E. siniansis)	
Enteromorphites compressus	Hu in Ding et al., 1996	China	synonymised	(Note: Synonymised into E. siniansis)	
Enteromorphites epicharis	Hu in Ding et al., 1996	China	synonymised	(Note: Synonymised into E. siniansis)	
Enteromorphites intestinalis	Xu, 2001	China	valid	(Note: Known from the Cambrian Maotianshan Shales)	
Enteromorphites magnus	Ye et al., 2019	China	valid		

== Distribution ==
Enteromorphites is predominately known from the Ediacaran of China, being found in the Lantian Formation, the Miaohe and Wenghui biotas in the Doushantuo Formation, as well as the Tongshan Lagerstätte in the Dengying Formation. It has also been found outside of China, namely in the Rawnsley Quartzite in Southern Australia.

Enteromorphites siniansis, alongside an undetermined species, has also been found within the late Cryogenian aged Nantuo Formation, being a member of the "Songluo biota" some ~650 Ma during the Marinoan glaciation. Enteromorphites has also been found in younger Cambrian rocks, primarily the 518 Ma old Chengjiang biota of the Maotianshan Shales in China.
