= Piyuancun Formation =

Geologic formation in Anhui Province, China

- Stratigraphic range: late Ediacaran – early Cambrian; ~551–514 Ma
- Type: Geological formation
- Underlies: Hetang Formation
- Overlies: Lantian Formation
- Thickness: 40 m (130 ft)

Lithology
- Primary: Chert
- Other: Limestone, Dolostone, Sandstone

Location
- Region: Anhui and Zhejiang
- Country: China

The Piyuancun Formation is a late Ediacaran to early Cambrian aged geologic formation China. The formation was deposited sometime between 551 – 514 Ma, and is composed predominately of cherts and limestones.

== Geology ==
The stratigraphy of Neoproterozoic rocks in the Piyuan region

The Piyuancan Formation can be found outcropping in Chun'an County, Zhejiang Province of North China, as well as Xiuning County, Anhui Province in South China, being conformably overlain by the shales of the Hetang Formation, whilst it is underlain by the dolostone rocks of the Lantian Formation. The formation itself is roughly 400 m (1,300 ft) thick, and is predominately composed of gray to black, medium- to thick-bedded cherts in the lower layers, which are inter-bedded with sandy dolostone and sandstones. Meanwhile, in the upper layers the formation is primarily composed of gray to black, medium-bedded microcrystalline limestone.

== Dating ==
Biostratigraphic correlation table of Neoproterozoic formations in South Anhui and Hubei, China, including the Piyuancun Formation

The Piyuancun Formation, was originally assumed to only be late Ediacaran in age, being correlated with the Dengying Formation, although a later study done by Xiang et al. in 2017 would find that the formation also extending partly into the Cambrian as well, likely Cambrian Stage 3, giving a temporal range of 551 - 514 Ma, or at least 37 Ma. From this, it has been inferred that the rate of deposition in the Piyuancun Formation was considerably lower, only coming in at roughly 0.75 g cm^{−2} Kyr^{−1}, whilst the overlying Hetang Formation was deposited in only 5 Ma, thus coming in at roughly 9.34 g cm^{−2} Kyr^{−1}.
