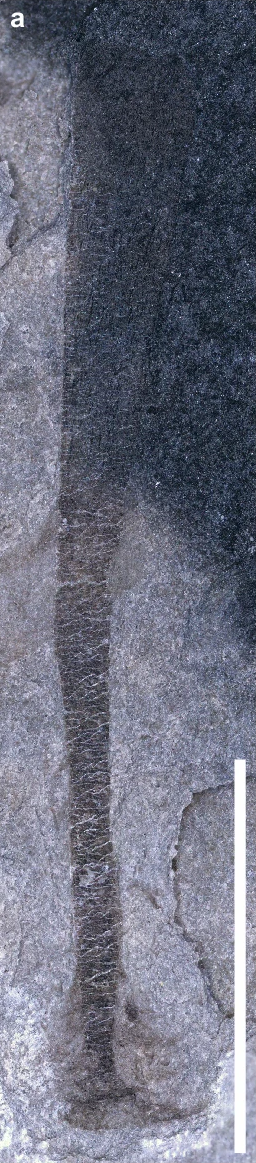
- Baculiphyca taeniata from the Tongshan Lagerstätte of the Dengying Formation

Scientific classification
- Domain: Eukaryota
- Supergroup: Archaeplastida
- Genus: †Baculiphyca; Yuan et al., 1995 (emend. Xiao et al., 2002)

Type species
- † Baculiphyca taeniata Yuan et al., 1995 (emend. Xiao et al., 2002)

Other species
- †Baculiphyca brevistipiata Ye et al. 2019; †Baculiphyca yunnanoense Li et al. 2026

Synonyms
- Baculiphyca; Diaoyapolites Chen in Chen et Xiao, 1991 (nomen nudem); Eoscytosiphon Ding in Ding et al. 1992 (nomen nudem); Miohenella Ding in Ding et al. 1992 (nomen nudem); B. taeniata; D. longiconoidalis Chen in Chen et Xiao, 1991 (nomen nudem); E. pristinus Ding in Ding et al. 1992 (nomen nudem); M. typicura Ding in Ding et al. 1992 (nomen nudem); M. eleganta Ding in Ding et al. 1992 (nomen nudem); Gesinella (?) gracilis Steiner 1994; M. conica Ding in Ding et al. 1996; M. rhomba Ding in Ding et al. 1996; M. nana Ding in Ding et al. 1996; M. taenina Chen et al. 1999

= Baculiphyca =

Baculiphyca Temporal range: late Cryogenian – Ediacaran ~650–543.74 Ma

Extinct species of enigmatic algae

Baculiphyca is an extinct genus of macro-algae fossil from the late Cryogenian and Ediacaran of South China. It is a elongate, clavate-shaped algal fossil, although its affinities remain unknown. It contains three species, Baculiphyca taeniata, Baculiphyca brevistipiata, and Baculiphyca yunnanoense.

== Discovery and naming ==
Fossils of Baculiphyca taeniata were first found in the Wenghui seciton in the Doushantuo Formation of the Yangtze Gorges area, Guizhou Province of South China, and were formally described and named in 1995. Fossils of the second species, B. brevistipiata, were found in the Sanlihuang section of the Doushantuo Formation, and were described in 2019. Fossils of the third species, B. yunnanoense, were found in the middle Jiucheng Member of the Dengying Formation, and where described and named in 2026.

The specific name of B. brevistipiata derives from the Latin words "brevis", to mean "short"; and "stipitatus", to mean "stipitate", in reference to the notably short but differentiated stipe this species bears. The specific name of B, yunnanoense derives from the Latinised place name of Yunnan Province, "Yunnano", the province in which the fossils were found in.

== Description ==
Baculiphyca is a elongated macro-algae, with a clavate-shaped thallus. The thallus is unbranched, with the body slightly tapering down to a discoidal holdfast structure, which occasionally preserves with small, filamentous rhizoids, which range between 0.1–0.3 mm (0.004–0.012 in) in width. The lower part of the thallus is commonly 0.5–1.5 mm (0–0 in) thick, and is three-dimensionally preserved. The overall length of the thallus ranges between 2.9–100 mm (0–4 in), whilst the width of the blade ranges between 0.3–6 mm (0–0 in).

== Taphonomy ==
Baculiphyca are commonly preserved with a rusty colour in the Doushantuo Formation, which is suggested to be due to the oxidation of pyrite in the fossils, which would have likely been cast or coated in the mineral, giving some parts of the fossils three-dimensional preservation, as well as sparse organic remains. Although, it is noted that other fossils from other sections of the formations are less influenced by pyrite mineralisation, thus presenting as range of preservation mods akin to the Burgess Shale, Chengjiang and Fezuouata biotas.

The holdfasts of Baculiphyca are also variably preserved, with some bearing no holdfast, some a small discoidal holdfast, whilst others bear rhizoidal holdfast. This has inferred that the differing preservation of the holdfasts is likely due to some fossils being uprooted or fragmented before burial, as well as potentially being the result of ontogenetic or ecophenotypic variations.

== Affinities ==
In 1999, Yuan et al. would describe Baculiphyca from the Lantian Formation, and regarded it as a form of eukaryotic algae, although placement within a higher taxonomic level was precluded, with Baculiphyca and other Lantian biota taxa either being Chlorophyta, Rhodophyta, or Phaeophyta based on their overall morphology. The placement as a eukaryotic algae has been supported since, with no further assignment to higher taxonomic levels.

== Taxonomic history ==
A line drawing of Baculiphyca taeniata, previously Gesinella (?) gracilis

Baculiphyca has a notably confusing taxonomic history, with multiple described genera and species being synonymised into it when Xiao et al. emended its description in 2002. Diaoyapolites longiconoidalis, described by Chen in Chen et Xiao in 1991, was noted to not have a holotype designated, thus making it a nomen nudem, or "naked name", in reference to a name without a fossil. In 1994, Steiner would make light of this, tentatively placing it within Gesinella as G. (?) gracilis. In 1992, Ding in Ding et al. would describe Eoscytosiphon and Miohenella, along with the myriad of species assigned to Miohenella, although once again no holotypes were designated for either genera and their respective species, thus making them too nomen nudem. Xiao et al. would consider all these various taxa, including G. (?) gracilis, preservational forms of Baculiphyca and the then only species B. taeniata, noting that whilst the name Gesinella is older, the fossils assigned to that genus are considerably different from Baculiphyca, bearing lateral branches and papillate structures on its blade, which Baculiphyca does not have.

== Distribution ==
Baculiphyca is predominately known from the Ediacaran of China, being found in the Lantian Formation, the Miaohe and Wenghui biotas in the Doushantuo Formation, as well as the Tongshan Lagerstätte and the Middle Jiucheng Member in the Dengying Formation.

An undetermined species of Baculiphyca has also been found within the late Cryogenian aged Nantuo Formation, being a member of the "Songluo biota" some ~650 Ma during the Marinoan glaciation.
