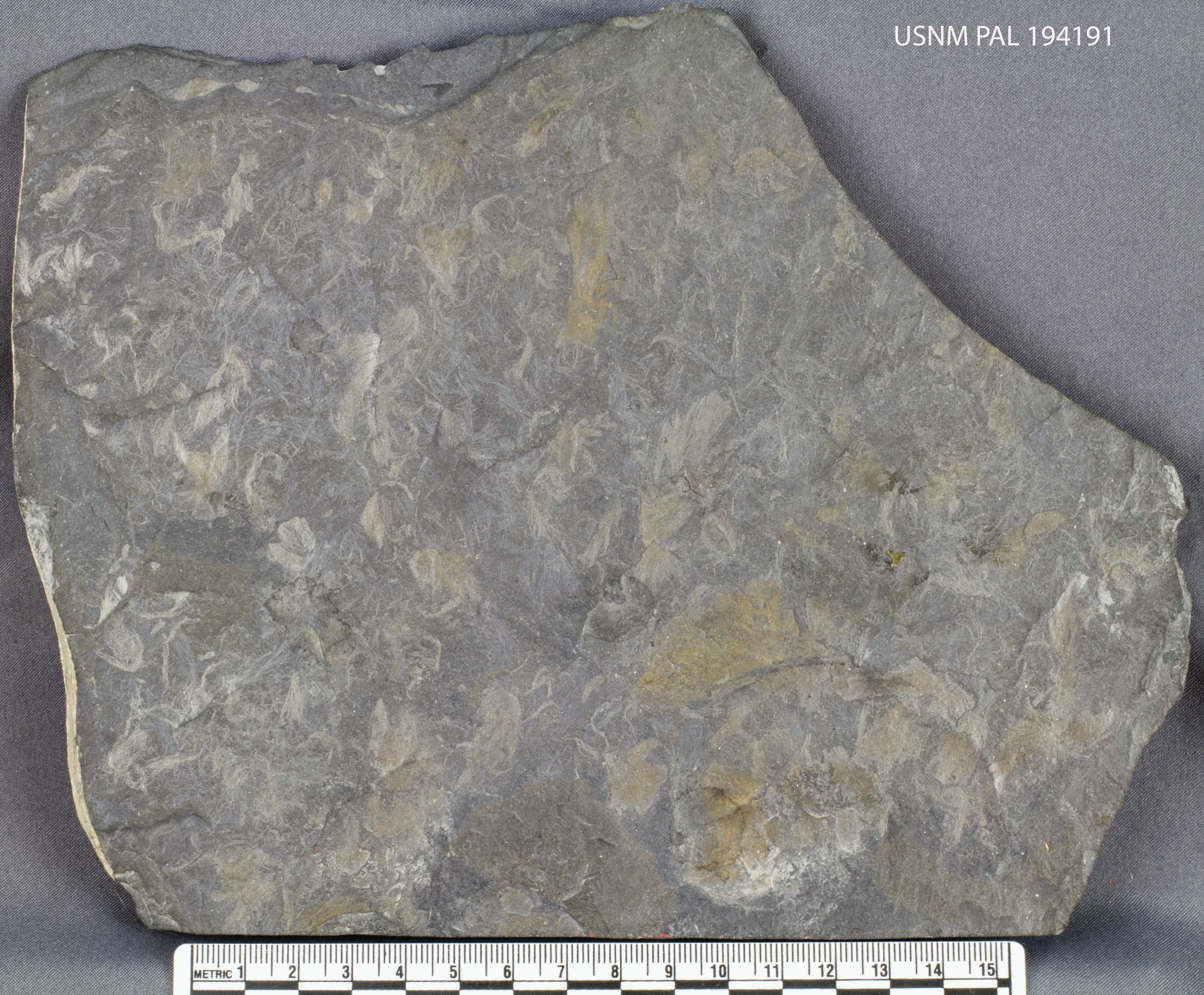
- Fossil of Marpolia from the Burgess Shale
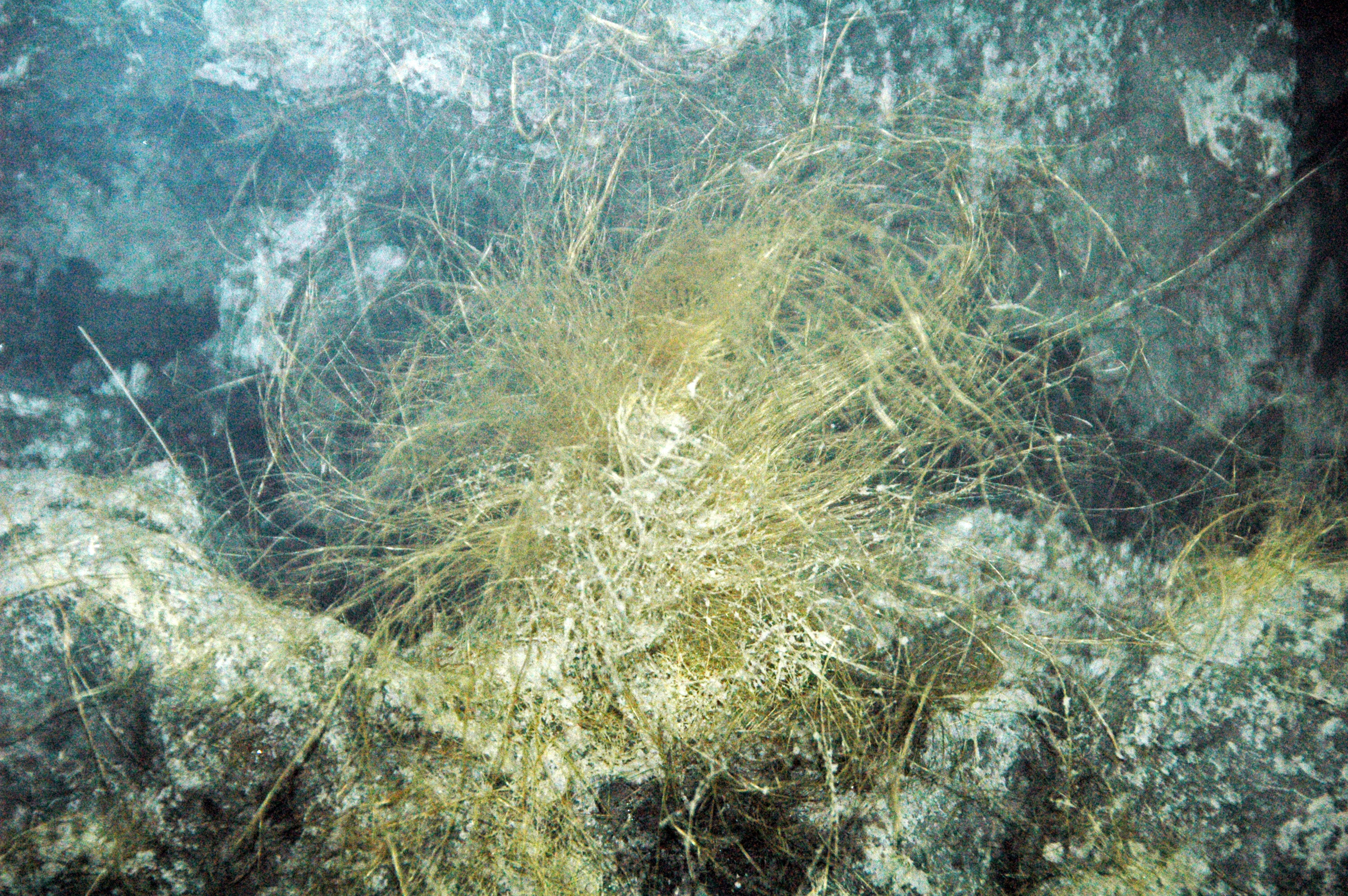
- Restoration model at the Museum of the Rockies in Bozeman, Montana

Scientific classification
- Domain: Bacteria
- Phylum: Cyanobacteria
- Class: Cyanophyceae
- Order: Nostocales
- Genus: †Marpolia Walcott, 1919
- Species: †M. spissa

Binomial name
- †Marpolia spissa Walcott, 1919

= Marpolia =

Marpolia Temporal range: Upper early Cambrian–Middle Cambrian

Extinct genus of bacteria

Marpolia is an extinct genus of bacteria that has been interpreted as a cyanobacterium, but also resembles the modern cladophoran green algae. It is known from the Middle Cambrian Burgess Shale and Early Cambrian deposits from the Czech Republic.

It comprises a dense mass of entangled, twisted filaments. It may have been free-floating or grown on other objects, although there is no evidence of attachment structures. 40 specimens of Marpolia are known from the Greater Phyllopod bed, where they comprise 0.08% of the community.
