= Lantian Formation =

Geologic formation in Anhui Province, China

- Stratigraphic range: early Ediacaran; ~635–551 Ma
- Systematic reconstruction of the Lantian Biota
- Type: Geological formation
- Sub-units: See: Members
- Underlies: Piyuancun Formation
- Overlies: Leigongwu Formation
- Thickness: ~150 m (490 ft)

Lithology
- Primary: Dolostone
- Other: Shale, mudstone, silt, limestone

Location
- Coordinates: 29.952°N 118.038°E
- Region: Anhui
- Country: China

Type section
- Named for: Lantian village, Xiuning County
- Named by: Xing, Gao et Liu
- Year defined: 1989
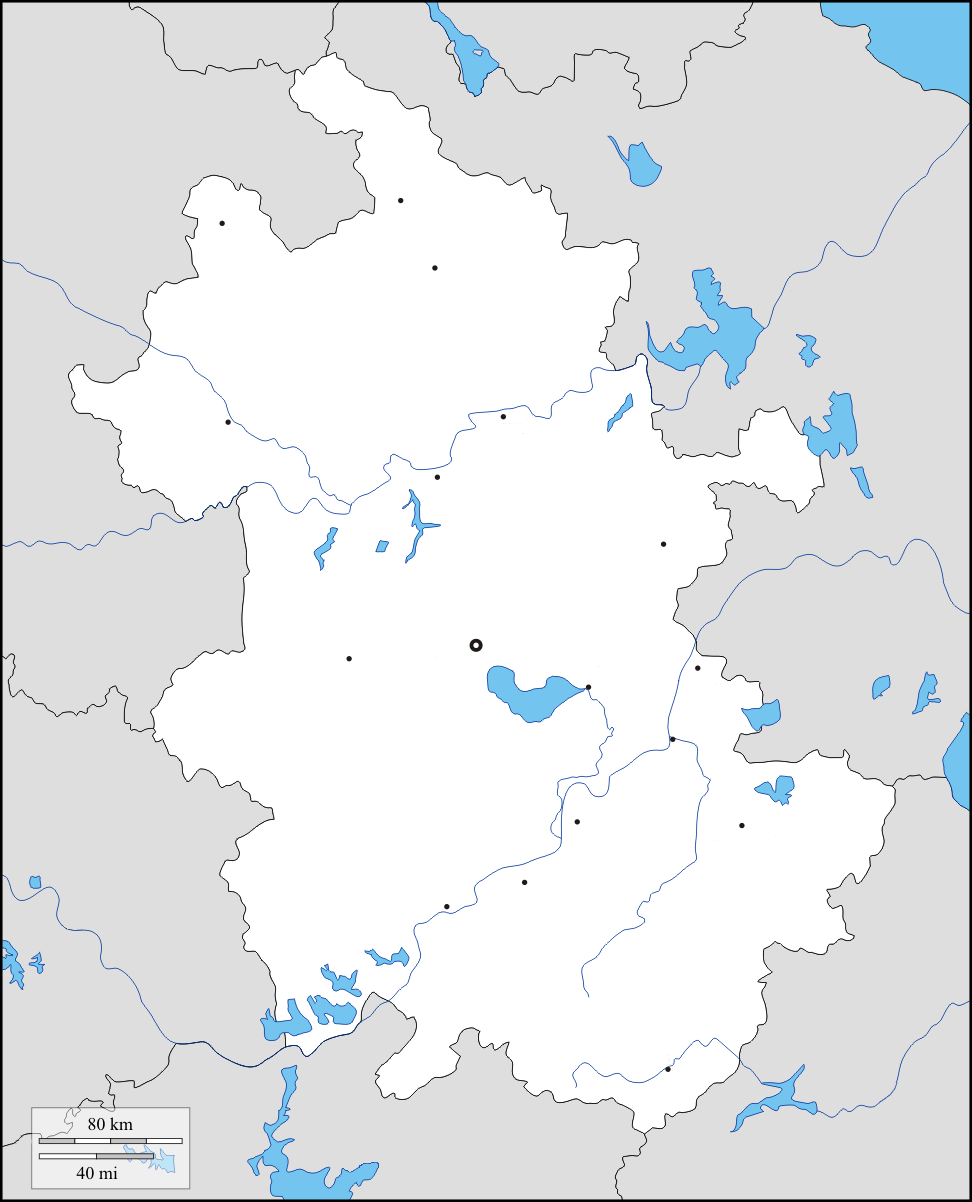
- Lantian Formation (China) Lantian Formation (Anhui)

The Lantian Formation is an Ediacaran aged geologic formation in Xiuning County, Anhui Province of South China. Deposited sometime between 635 – 551 Ma and composed predominately of dolostones, the formation contains the Lantian Biota, a collection of large macrofossils dated to around 602±7 Ma, which includes putative (Note: To mean "supposed/assumed") cnidarian-grade fossils and macro-algae.

This biota lived within a deep-water, but photic environment, inferred from the lack of certain sedimentary structures, as well as the presence of certain isotopes. This environment fairly consistently switched between being non-oyxgenated to being oxygenated, which not only permitted the quickened evolution and growth of fossil organisms during oxygenation events, but also preserved them during euxinic periods. The Lantian Biota was previously the oldest known Ediacaran macrofossil biota until the discovery of the Ancanping Assemblage in older rocks of the Doushantuo Formation.

== History of research ==
Prior to its formal naming, the rocks of the formation were found by Xing Yusheng, Bi Zi-guo and Xian-fang Wang in 1985, who also discovered the first macrofossils in the area. In 1988, Bi Zi-guo, alongside a number of other researchers, published a paper reporting more on the area and the fossils within. In 1989, Xing, alongside Gao and Liu, published a formal description of the whole formation and some of the fossils in The Stratigraphy of China - Vol.3, alongside the formal naming of the "Lantian Formation", taking its name from the nearby Lantian village.

== Geology ==
The stratigraphy of Neoproterozoic rocks in the Piyuan region

The Lantian Formation can be found outcropping in Anhui Province in South China, being overlain by the siliceous rocks of the Piyuancun Formation, whilst it is underlain by the Marinoan-aged glacial diamictites of the Leigongwu Formation. The formation itself is split into four members, and is roughly ~150 m (490 ft) thick.

=== Members ===
The Lantian Formation is composed of four formal, but unnamed, members. In ascending stratigraphic order (lowest to highest) :

- Member I: This member is entirely composed of cap dolostone rock, ranging between 1.8–4 m (5.9–13.1 ft) in thickness, which conformably overlies the Marinoan-aged Leigongwu Formation below it.
- Member II: This member is predominately composed of gray calcereous siltstone, and mudstone in a lower 21–24 m (69–79 ft) thick layer, all of which is interbedded with argillaceous, fine-grained sandstone, as well as finely laminated black shale, which becomes the dominate rock in the upper 40–69 m (131–226 ft) of the member, where it is occsionally interbedded with argillaceous limestone. These upper shales are fossiliferous in nature, containing the Lantian Biota.
- Member III: This member is primarily composed of a gray argillaceous dolostone, which is inter-bedded with black shale, in the lower 26–30 m (85–98 ft) thick layer, whilst in the upper 40–50 m (130–160 ft) thick layer, it is composed of thick ribbons of gray limestone intercalated with dolostone.
- Member IV: This member is composed entirely of black to dark-gray silty mudstone and shale, up to 10–20 m (33–66 ft) in thickness, which are overlain by the Piyuancun Formation.

== Geobiology ==
The Lantian Formation was amongst the first deep-water formations to be studied for its geobiology, which at the time had only been done on shallow-water formations. Data and samples were predominately gathered using a drill core close to Lantian Village, with some samples also coming from an outcrop of Member III near to the drill core site. Study of the samples yielded a range of isoptoes, including δ13C carbonate-carbon, carbonate-oxygen, and organic-carbon, δ34S pyrite and carbonate-associated calcium sulfide, as well as sedimentary δ15N.

The δ13C carbonate carbon isotopes from the lower layers present a notable large spatial gradient, with a magnitude of >10‰, which has been inferred to likely be the result of Carbon-13-depleted calcite cements within organic-rich but carbonate-poor sediments, which where deposited in a deep-water facies. This then becomes a notable negative δ13C carbonate carbon excursion in the upper layers, which has been previously described from other areas of South China as the "Ediacaran Negative excursion 3", which itself is correlated to the Shuram excursion. Meanwhile, the δ34S pyrite isotopes present a spatial pattern, and are more negative in deep-water facies, although the δ34S carbonate-associated calcium sulfide isotopes are considerably more scarce, thus precluding any proper determination of spatial patterns for all δ34S isotopes. The δ34S pyrite isotopes themselves are inferred to be evidence of a chemically stratified basin setting, with the environment itself primarily being an euxinic deep-water environment, meaning there was little to no oxygen and an abundance of sulfide. Here, pyrite would have precipitated better in the water column, presenting lower δ34S pyrite values in the deposited sediments as a result, whilst isotopes found in the non-euxinic shallower-water settings would be higher due to the pyrite instead forming within the sediments. As for the sedimentary δ15N isotopes, it has been noted that the recorded isotopes are strangely consistent, especially when compared to the variation seen in modern oceans. The isotopes themselves not highly positive, which is indicative of partial denitrification in suboxic environments, although any further study in regards to the sedimentary δ15N isotopes is precluded, due to its current sparse spatial and stratigraphic coverage.

== Age ==
Biostratigraphic correlation table of Neoproterozoic formations in South Anhui and Hubei, China, including the Lantian Formation

The Lantian Formation, and more specifically the Lantian Biota, was originally assumed to be late Ediacaran in age, being correlated with the Miaohe biota in the Doushantuo Formation at 551 Ma, although a later study in 2011 by Yuan et al. noted that δ13C values in the lowest member were similar to that seen in the lower layers of the Doushantuo, which at this point was dated to 635 Ma. Further up in Member III, there is a notably large negative δ13C excursion, similar to what is seen in Member III of the Doushantuo Formation in the Yangtze Gorges area. With this, Yuan et al. saw the Lantian Formation instead correlated to the lower members of the Doushantuo, giving it an increased temporal range of 635 - 551 Ma.

A later study done in 2022 by Yang et al. using Re–Os dating in the middle layers of Member II, recovered a date of 602±7 Ma, giving an absolute date for the Lantian Biota. From this, they were able to infer that the youngest fossils of the Lantian Biota was older than 580 Ma, based on the known dates of the Shuram excursion in Member III, which is 574.0 – 567.3 Ma. This would also see the youngest fossils of the Lantian Formation become contemporary with the oldest microfossils of the Weng'an biota in the Doushantuo Formation. There are no known date constraints at the base of the Lantian Formation, with it only being correlated to 635 Ma. As such the researchers tentatively put forward a nominal age of 615 Ma for the oldest fossils, partially inferred from the absolute date of 602±7 Ma, noting an uncertainty ranging within a few million years.

== Taphonomy ==
The taphonomy of fossils within the Lantian Formation are similar to a Burgess Shale-type preservation style, being predominately preserved as carbonaceous films. Fossils are also randomly oriented on the bedding planes they are found on. Alongside this, lack of breakages and folding in fossil material suggests that the fossils were not transported, and instead were preserved in-situ. A study done in 2014 found that the preserved material contained densely-packed framboidal pyrites, leaving clusters of cavities within the fossil specimens. It was noted that the pyritization of fossil material likely occurred some time after fossilization of the organisms. The pyrites of fossils in the Lantian Formation are considerably larger than the pyrites seen in the surrounding matrix, which was inferred as these respective pyrites being formed under differing redox conditions.

== Paleoenvironment ==
The environment of the Lantian Formation at the time of deposition was likely to have been below the storm wave base, inferred from the lack of cross-stratification, wave- and current-influenced sedimentary structures, as well as no grading being found within the laminae of Member II. Alongside this, the aforementioned in-situ preservation also likely means that the environment was well within the photic zone, although was still relatively deep, being somewhere between 50–200 m (160–660 ft) deep overall, and was thus likely calm due to the lack of high density currents, again inferred from the lack of wave- and current-influenced structures. The presence of macroalgae also suggests that unlike modern anoxic environments within the photic zone today, the environment of the Lantian had some form of free oxygen below the storm wave base, which was likely locally available during oxic episodes.

The aforementioned study done on various isotopes in the Lantian Formation further supported this, suggesting that the usually common euxinic environments where replaced by brief oxygenation events, permitting macro-algae and putative metazoans to evolve and thrive. They would have then been killed off and preserved when these events ended, with the environment returning to its normal euxinic state.

== Paleobiota ==
A slab of Flabellophyton fossils, likely to be a single reproduction cohort

The Lantian Formation is home to the Lantian Biota, which was previously the oldest known Ediacaran macroscopic biota before the discovery of the lower Doushantuo Formation macrofossils. This biota is predominately composed of macro-algal forms such as Flabellophyton and Doushantuophyton, although contains a sparse record of metazoan fossils, such as the palaeopascichnid organism Palaeopascichnus, and putative cnidarian-like organisms such as Qianchuania and Piyuania. Although recent studies do not agree with the placement of the putative cnidarian-grade fossils, noting that this is predominately based on the gross morphology of the fossil material in question, and are likely macro-algae. Despite this, it has been noted that if the relation to metazoans could be confirmed, then they could be of use as a maximum calibration for crown Metazoa.

The biodiversity of differing forms shows that after the Marinoan glaciation, eukaryotes developed fairly rapidly and increased in diversity before the classical Ediacaran biota, likely further influenced by the locally intermittent oxygen, permitting larger, epibenthic macro-algae communities to evolve and become more present. This was further supported with the discovery of the older Ancanping assemblage from the Doushantuo Formation, and although it contains a greater diversity, the fossils there are considerably smaller than what is seen in the Lantian Formation, fitting in with the temporal trend of increasing sizes and morphologies after the Cryogenian period into the later Ediacaran biotas, such as the Lantian Biota.

Color key: Taxon / Reclassified taxon / Taxon falsely reported as present / Dubious taxon or junior synonym / Ichnotaxon / Ootaxon / Morphotaxon

Notes
Uncertain or tentative taxa are in small text
~~crossed out~~ taxa are discredited.

=== Algae ===
Genus	Species	Notes	Images
Chuaria	C. circularis	Enigmatic fossil, possibly synonymous with Tawuia.	Chuaria from the older Ancanping assemblage of the Doushantuo Formation
Doushantuophyton	D. lineare; D. cometa; D. rigidulum	Branching macroalgae, D. rigidulum first described from this formation.	Doushantuophyton lineare from the older Ancanping assemblage of the Doushantuo Formation
Huangshanophyton	H. fluticulosum	Macroalgae, first described from this formation.	Huangshanophyton fluticulosum in the Anhui Geological Museum
Anhuiphyton	A. lineatum	Macroalgae, first described from this formation.	Line drawing reconstruction of Anhuiphyton lineatum from the Lantian Formation
Baculiphyca	Baculiphyca sp.	Macroalgae.	Baculiphyca taeniata from the Tongshan Lagerstätte, Dengying Formation, China
Enteromorphites	E. siniansis	Macroalgae.	Enteromorphites siniansis from the older Ancanping assemblage of the Doushantuo Formation
Konglingiphyton	K. erecta	Macroalgae.	Konglingiphyton erecta from the older Ancanping assemblage of the Doushantuo Formation
Flabellophyton	F. lantianensis; F. strigata; Flabellophyton sp.	Macroalgae, first described from this formation.	A reconstruction of Flabellophyton lantianense from the Lantian Formation

=== incertae sedis ===
Genus	Species	Notes	Images
Orbisiana	O. linearis	Palaeopascichnid organism. Species would be synonymised into Palaeopascichnus.	A photograph of a fossil of Orbisiana spumea, which is preserved as a series of spherical chambers
Palaeopascichnus	P. linearis	Palaeopascichnid organism.	A photograph of a fossil of Palaeopascichnus linearis, which is preserved as a series of spherical chambers
Lantianella	L. laevis; L. annularis	Cnidarian-grade or algal fossil.	A photograph of a fossil of Lantianella laevis, which is preserved as a cone-like body with a crown of tentacles coming out from an opening in the top
Piyuania	P. cyathiformis	Cnidarian-grade fossil.	A drawing of Piyuania cyathiformis, which is blue in colour, with an enclosed cone-like body that contains a smaller, pink-ish coloured enclosed cone, which bears a small crown of tiny tentacles extending upwards
Qianchuania	Q. fusiformis	Cnidarian-grade fossil.	A drawing of Qianchuania fusiformis, which is brown-ish in colour, with a slender cone-like body that contains a smaller, cylinderical inner structure that has a singular, tentacle-like stucture extending upwards from the top
Xiuningella	X. rara	Bilaterian-grade, Cnidarian-grade or algal fossil.	A photograph of a fossil of Xiuningella rara, which is preserved as a cylindrical-shaped body, with a small stalk and rounded holdfast

== See also ==
- Ediacaran biota – Classical group of late Ediacaran fossils
- Nantuo Formation – Macrofossil-bearing formation in the Cryogenian
