= Hirnantian =

Third and last age of the Late Ordovician epoch

- 445.2 ± 0.9 – 443.1 ± 0.9 Ma

Chronology
| ← / First land plant spores; ← / Ordovician meteor event |
Subdivision of the Ordovician according to the ICS, as of 2024. Vertical axis scale: Millions of years ago

Etymology
- Name formality: Formal

Usage information
- Celestial body: Earth
- Regional usage: Global (ICS)
- Time scale(s) used: ICS Time Scale

Definition
- Chronological unit: Age
- Stratigraphic unit: Stage
- Time span formality: Formal
- Lower boundary definition: FAD of the graptoliteNormalograptus extraordinarius
- Lower boundary GSSP: Wangjiawan section, Wangjiawan, Yichang, China; 30.9841°N 111.4197°E
- Lower GSSP ratified: 2006
- Upper boundary definition: First appearance of the graptolite Akidograptus ascensus
- Upper boundary GSSP: Dob's Linn, Moffat, U.K. 55.4400°N 3.2700°W
- Upper GSSP ratified: 1984

The Hirnantian is the final internationally recognized stage of the Ordovician Period of the Paleozoic Era. It was of short duration, lasting about 2.1 million years, from 445.2 to 443.1 Ma (million years ago). The early part of the Hirnantian was characterized by cold temperatures, major glaciation, and a severe drop in sea level. In the latter part of the Hirnantian, temperatures rose, the glaciers melted, and sea level returned to the same or to a slightly higher level than it had been prior to the glaciation.

Most scientists believe that this climatic oscillation caused the major extinction event that took place during this time. In fact, the Hirnantian (also known as the End Ordovician and the Ordovician-Silurian) mass extinction event represents the second largest such event in geologic history. Approximately 85% of marine (sea-dwelling) species died. Only the End-Permian mass extinction was larger. Unlike many smaller extinction events, however, the long-term consequences of the End Ordovician event were relatively small. Following the climatic oscillation, the climate returned to its previous state, and the species that survived soon (within two or three million years) evolved into species very similar to the ones that existed before.

== Naming and history ==
The Hirnantian was named after Cwm Hirnant south of Bala, in northern Wales. Cwm Hirnant means the "valley of the long stream" in Welsh.

The stage was introduced in 1933 by B.B. Bancroft. As proposed by Bancroft, the Hirnantian included the Hirnant Limestone and related sedimentary formations. These formations were located at the very top of Ordovician deposits, and were dominated by a fauna which included brachiopods, trilobites, and other "shelly" or hard-coated animals. In 1966, D. A. Bassett, Harry Blackmore Whittington, and A. Williams, writing in the Journal of the Geological Society of London, proposed a refinement to the Hirnantian Stage. This expanded the stage to include all of the Foel-y-Ddinas Mudstones, of which the Hirnant Limestone is a part. This expansion brought the Hirnantian Stage to its current scope.

The International Commission on Stratigraphy (ICS) originally divided the Upper Ordovician into two stages. After considerable research, however, it was determined that no single faunal zone existed that could accommodate the upper stage of this division. Therefore, in 2003, the ICS voted to add an additional stage to its official international time scale. This was named the Hirnantian after Bancroft's stage. In 2006 the ICS ratified the Wangjiawan section as the official Global Boundary Stratotype Section and Point (GSSP) for the Hirnantian Stage.

== GSSP ==
Map of China showing the GSSP location.

The reference lower rock boundary (GSSP) of the Hirnantian is the Wangjiawan section (30.9841°N 111.4197°E) near the village Wangjiawan, 42 km north of Yichang (Hubei, China). It is an outcrop of the Wufeng and overlying Lungmachi Formation, the former containing the base of the Hirnantian. Both formations consist mainly of shale and chert. The base is defined as the first appearance datum of the graptolite species Normalograptus extraordinarius in that section.

Secondary markers are Normalograptus ojsuensi 4 cm below the boundary, and the Hirnantia Fauna 39 cm above the boundary.

== Major events ==
As mentioned above, there was a major climatic oscillation during the Hirnantian, which is believed to have caused a major mass extinction event. When the Hirnantian Stage began, the Earth's climate was hot and sea-levels were substantially higher than today. The seas were filled with a diverse fauna. However, there is considerable evidence to indicate that many of these species were already in trouble when the Hirnantian began, and that overall biological diversity was already in sharp decline.

As the climate cooled and glaciers formed during the early part of the Hirnantian, sea level dropped. Estimates of the depth of this drop range from more than 50 meters (based on studies in Nevada and Utah) to more than 100 meters (from studies in Norway and the United Kingdom). More recent research indicates a worldwide reduction in sea level of approximately 80 meters. This drop dried up and exposed the extensive shallow-water continental shelves that existed throughout the world at that time, causing the extinction of large numbers of species who depended on this shallow water environment. Those species that survived were greatly reduced in numbers. The overall result was a major reduction in the biodiversity of the world's oceans.

During this ice-house period (as scientists sometimes call periods of global cold climate and glaciation), surviving species began to adapt. Cold environment species replaced the warm environment species that had thrived during the previous hot period (hot-house to scientists).

Just as the species were adapting, however, the climate changed again. During the latter part of the Hirnantian, temperatures rose, the glaciers melted, and sea level rose to the same or perhaps an even higher level than before the glaciation. The exposed shelves were flooded, resulting in additional extinctions among the fauna that had survived the first extinction event.

== Dating ==
While there are no major radiometric dates for the Hirnantian itself, there are two such dates which bracket the Hirnantian. Both dates are from the Dob's Linn area in the United Kingdom.

The older one comes from the local Hartfell shale formations. Zircon found in an ash deposit at the site was dated to 445.7 mya, with a margin of error of plus or minus 2.4 million years.

The younger date is from the early Silurian Birkhill shale formations. Radiometric dating placed zircon samples found in another ash deposit at 438.7 mya, with a margin of error of plus or minus 2.1 million years.

With these dates as a base, scientists were able to use biostratigraphic correlation techniques to determine close approximations for the timing of various events during the Hirnantian.

== Subdivisions ==
There are two graptolite biozones in the Hirnantian and these are of approximately equal length. The base (beginning) of the Hirnantian Stage is defined by the first appearance in the geologic record of the graptolite Normalograptus extraordinarius, and thus, the Normalograptus extraordinarius biozone defines the early (or lower) part of the Hirnantian. The later (or upper) part is defined by the first appearance of the graptolite Normalograptus persulptus, and the Normalograptus persulptus biozone lasts from then until the end of the Hirnantian. This also marks the end of the Ordovician Period.

These biozones allow for additional refinement in dating events occurring within the Hirnantian Stage.

== Paleogeography ==
During the Hirnantian, much of the world's land mass was gathered into a supercontinent called Gondwana, which occupied extreme southern latitudes and covered the south pole. This included South America, Africa, most of Australia, the bulk of India, and Antarctica. What is now west Africa was then located at the pole, while South America was close by, joined to Africa along the latter's west coast. Along Africa's east coast were Antarctica and India, while Australia lay just to the north of them, straddling the equator. To the north of Australia was New Guinea. It may have been the northernmost point of land in the world, located just above 30 degrees north latitude. To the north of it lay a vast, uninterrupted sea, known today as the Panthalassic ocean.

Not yet joined with what would become North America were Florida, southern Georgia, and the coastal areas of Mississippi, Alabama, and South Carolina wedged into a gap between Africa and South America, and located very near the South pole.

The rest of North America (called Laurentia by scientists) lay to the north and west of Gondwana, with relatively warmer climates. Rotated almost 45 degrees from their modern orientation, the eastern states of today's U.S. were located along the southeast coast of the continent, while the coastal areas of what are now the southeastern states faced south.

To the east of Laurentia, across a long, narrow sea, was Baltica. Composed of modern Norway, Sweden, Finland, Denmark, northeastern Germany and Russia west of the Ural Mountains, this area ranged from the equator in the north to more than 30 degrees south latitude.

Stretching westward from its southwest tip was an island arc known as Avalonia by modern scientists. This consisted of what is now the southern parts of Britain and Ireland, and eastern coastal regions of Newfoundland, Nova Scotia, New Brunswick, and New England.

== Correlations to regional stages ==
The Hirnantian now represents an internationally accepted stage with a carefully specified global beginning and ending. However, it started out in the nineteenth century as a regional stage in the United Kingdom, where it remains as such today. Since various regions of the world have their own local divisions of geologic time below the Period level, the following list provides correlations between those regional stages (or epochs in some cases) and the internationally recognized Hirnantian Stage.

- Australasia – The Hirnantian is equal to approximately the top 20% of the regional Bolindian epoch.
- Baltica – The Hirnantian is equivalent to the upper 50% of the regional Porkuni stage.
- China – The Hirnantian is roughly equal to the upper 25% of the regional Wufeng stage.
- North America – The Hirnantian is equivalent to all of the regional Gamachian stage.
- United Kingdom – The Hirnantian is nearly equal to the regional Hirnantian stage, which starts slightly (maybe 100,000 years) earlier. The regional Hirnantian constitutes roughly the upper 20% of the Ashgill epoch.

== Sources ==
- Salvador, Amos, ed., 1994. International Stratigraphic Guide (The International Union of Geological Sciences and The American Geological Society).
- Sheehan, Peter, "The Late Ordovician Mass Extinction" (Annual Review of Earth and Planetary Sciences, 2001, pp. 331–364).
- Webby, Barry D. and Mary L. Droser, eds., 2004. The Great Ordovician Biodiversification Event (Columbia University Press).
