= Wahpia =

Wahpia Temporal range: Burgess Shale

Scientific classification
- Domain: Eukaryota
- (unranked): Archaeplastida
- Division: Rhodophyta
- Class: Rhodophyceae
- Genus: Wahpia

Extinct genus of algae

Wahpia is a genus of alga known from the Middle Cambrian Burgess Shale. 33 specimens of Wahpia are known from the Greater Phyllopod bed, where they comprise 0.06% of the community.
