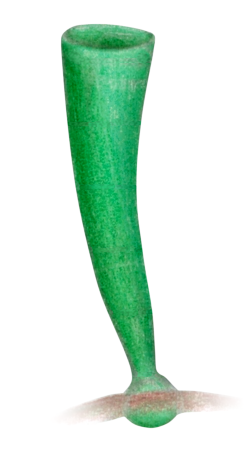
- A reconstruction of the type species Flabellophyton lantianense as an algae

Scientific classification
- Kingdom: incertae sedis
- Genus: †Flabellophyton; Steiner, 1994

Type species
- † Flabellophyton lantianensis Steiner, 1994

Other species
- †Flabellophyton (?) strigata Yuan, Li et Gao, 1999; †Flabellophyton typicum Wan et al., 2020; †Flabellophyton obesum Wan et al., 2020; †Flabellophyton stupendum Xiao et al., 2020

Synonyms
- Flabellophyton; Cyathophyton Bi et al., 1987 (nomen nudum); Huizhouella Yan et al., 1992 (nomen nudem); Flabelliphyton Yan et al., 1992 (nomen nudem); F. lantianensis; Huizhouella longifolius Yan et al., 1992 (nomen nudem); Flabelliphyton piyuancunensis Chen, Lu et Xiao, 1994; F. typicum; Cyathophyton forrnosum Bi et al., 1987; C. simplicis Bi et al., 1987 (nomen nudem); Huizhouella typicus Yan et al., 1992 (nomen nudem); H. scoparius Yan et al., 1992 (nomen nudem); Flabellophyton scopijormis Chen, Lu et Xiao, 1994; F. cancellatum Chen, Lu et Xiao, 1994; F. obesum; Flabelliphyton formosus Yan et al., 1992 (nomen nudem)

= Flabellophyton =

Flabellophyton Temporal range: Ediacaran ~602–539 Ma

Extinct genus of a probable Rhodophyta algae

Flabellophyton is an extinct macro-algae fossil from the Ediacaran of China, Australia, and India. It is a fan-shaped algal fossil, although its exact affinities remains unknown, and it has a varied taxonomic history. It contains five species, F. lantianensis, F. (?) strigata, F. typicum, F. obescum, and F. stupendum.

== Discovery and naming ==
Fossils of Flabellophyton were first found in the Lantian Formation of Xiuning County, Anhui Province of South China, and was formally described and named in 1994. Despite the genus being named, later in 1994 Michael Steiner regarded this as a nomen nudem, and thus re-erected it, which was supported in 2020. Fossils of the second species, F. strigata, were recovered from the Miaohe section of the Doushantuo Formation, and were formally described and named in 1999. Fossils of the third species, F. typicum, were recovered from the Lantian Formation and the Shibantan Member of the Dengying Formation; fossils of the fourth species, F. obesum were recovered from the Lantian Formation only, with both being formally described and named in 2020. Fossils of a fifth species, F. stupendum, were recovered from the Ediacara Member of the Rawnsley Quartzite, and were formally described and named in 2020.

The generic name of Flabellophyton was retained by Steiner in honour of the Chinese researchers studying the Neoproterozoic strata of China. The specific name of F. strigata derives from the Latin word "strigatus", to mean "striped/streaked", in reference to the darker transverse lines on fossils of the species. The specific name of F. typicum derives from the Latin word "typicus", to mean "typical", in reference to the intermediate conical shape of the species. The specific name of F. obesum derives from the Latin word "obesus", in reference to the obtuse concial shape of the species. The specific name of F. stupendum derives from the Latin word "stupendus", to mean "to be wondered at", in reference to the notably large size and spectacular preservation of the species.

== Description ==
A line drawing of F. lantianensis by Steiner (1994)

Flabellophyton is a fan-shaped macro-algae, with a discoidal holdfast structure at the base composed of compact filaments. Specimens of F. lantianensis are smooth, with the thallus ranging between 20–280 mm (1–11 in) in length and 5–10 mm (0.2–0.4 in) in width, with the taper angled at 25−35°. Specimens of F. strigata bear six transverse nodes which are regularly spaced from each other, with the thallus ranging between 15–40 mm (1–2 in) in length and 7–15 mm (0.3–0.6 in) in width. Specimens of F. typicum are filamenteous in appearance, with this being more compact at the base than the top, with the overall thallus ranging between 10–200 mm (0.4–7.9 in) in length and 4–40 mm (0.2–1.6 in) in width, with the filaments ranging between 0.01–2 mm (0.0004–0.0787 in) in width, whilst the holdfast structures are roughly 4 mm (0.2 in) when found. Specimens of F. obesum are considerablly shorter and broader in shape, though still bear the fan-shape of the genus. Specimens of F. stupendum are considerably larger than most species, with the thallus ranging between 100–250 mm (4–10 in) in length and 50 mm (2 in) in width, whilst the holdfast structure ranges between 15–60 mm (1–2 in) in diameter.

== Paleoecology ==
Flabellophyton is suggested to have been a concial, epibenthic macro-algae in life, inferred from the presence of a holdfast structure at its base, as well as the fact that a flat fan-shaped body would have been hydrodynamically unstable, and would have folded when buried, which is not present in any known fossils, thus favouring a more conical-shaped body. Flabellophyton was also likely hollow in life as well due to this shape, and likely bore an upper circular aperture.

== Affinities ==
The general gross morphology of Flabellophyton, alongside the filaments that make up the body, are noted to be consistent with other known fossil and extant algae. Although it has been noted to bear similarities to the putative cnidarian-grade metazoan Lantianella from the Lantian Formation, and it could be considered as an incomplete specimen, although this has yet to be fully confirmed. Similarities to other concial organisms such as Ausia fenestrata, Thectardis, and Wutubus are also noted, specially due to the open and hollow nature of said fossils. Although these are different due to the lack of filamenteous construction of their bodies. It has thus been noted that Flabellophyton is an enigmatic genus with unknown affinities.

== Taxanomic history ==
A line drawing of the holotype of F. lantianensis by Steiner (1994)

Flabellophyton has a varied taxonomic history. Before its formal description in 1994, its fossil had actually been described in 1987 by Bi et al. as Cyathophyton, with two species C. formosum and C. simplicis, although no holotype specimens had been designated for the genus or either species, thus making them nomen nudem, or a "naked name", a name without a fossil. In 1992, Yan et al. would also describe these fossils as Huizhouella and Flabelliphyton, with three species H. typicus, H. longifolius, and H. scoparius and F. formosus respetively, although once again no holotype specimens were designated.

The fossil was described again by Chen, Li et Xiao in 1994, with F. lantianensis, F. scopiformis, F. cancellatum, and F. piyuancunensis being named as the species of the newly erected genus Flabellophyton. Michael Steiner noticed that Chen, Li et Xiao's genus Flabellophyton was invalid, and sought to rectify this and created a new genus, although this time kept the name Flabellophyton in honour of the original researchers. Yuan et al. found new material in 1999, and alongside the original description of Flabellophyton in Chen, Li et Xiao's 1994 paper, noted that F. scopiformis, F. cancellatum and F. piyuancunensis fit that description, and were likely the result of varying taphonomic factors and degradation. Yuan et al. also rejected Steiners attempt at invalidating Chen, Li et Xiao's original 1994 description in the same year, noting it was unjustified, as Chen, Li et Xiao had given plenty of information to ensure its validity.

However, a later study done in 2020 by Wan et al. noted that Steiner was indeed correct, as although a description and holotype had been designated, the repository of said type specimens was not, thus resulting in Chen, Li et Xiao's 1994 description being invalid, and Steiner's 1994 description remaining valid. Wan et al., also noted that the transverse lines in F. strigata likely represented carbonaceous bands of filaments, thus regarding it as a skeletal body held up by these bands in 2013. In 2020 they would tentatively exclude F. strigata, until these claims would be further verified.

=== Species ===
Flabellophyton currently contains five species, four of which are valid and one tentative. There are also three invalid and synonimised species, which are as follows:

Species	Authority	Location	Status	Notes	Refs
Flabellophyton lantianensis	Steiner, 1994	China	valid	(Note: Type species. Originally described by Chen, Li et Xiao, although material was invalid due to lack of designated repository, thus Steiner would erect a new genus under the same name)	
Flabellophyton scopijormis	Chen, Lu et Xiao, 1994	China	synonymised	(Note: Synonymised into F. typicum)	
Flabellophyton cancellatum	Chen, Lu et Xiao, 1994	China	synonymised	(Note: Synonymised into F. typicum)	
Flabellophyton piyuancunensis	Chen, Lu et Xiao, 1994	China	synonymised	(Note: Synonymised into F. lantianensis)	
Flabellophyton (?) strigata	Yuan, Li et Gao, 1999	China	tentative	(Note: Tentative placement to Flabellophyton due to its transverse banding)	
Flabellophyton typicum	Wan et al., 2020	China	valid		
Flabellophyton obesum	Wan et al., 2020	China	valid		
Flabellophyton stupendum	Xiao et al., 2020	Australia	valid		

== Distribution ==
Flabellophyton is predominately found in China, namely the Lantian Formation, and the Miaohe section of the Doushantuo Formation, as well as the middle Jiucheng and Shibantan Members of the Dengying Formation. It has also been found in formations outside of China, such as the Rawnsley Quartzite in Southern Australia, and the Sonia Sandstone in India.

== Taphonomy ==
Due to the wide distribution of Flabellophyton, it has been preserved in various different ways, which are as follows:

- Carbonaceous Compression: Specimens found from the Lantian Formation are commonly preserved as carbonaceous compressions in the shales of the formation, and are randomly distributed and oriented across the surface of said shale. They are mostly complete, being preserved with holdfast structures, indicating that they were here preserved in-situ, meaning they did not move after death. The colour of these compressions are dark gray to brown when weathered, constrating with the matrix. Fresh and better preserved specimens however are noted to nearly be enitrely black in colour, making it difficult to discern them from the surrounding matrix, requiring the use of a Scanning electron microscope to view the fossils.
- Cast/Mold: Specimens found from the Shibantan Member in the Dengying Formation are commonly preserved as casts/molds in the limestones of the formation, and are randomly distributed and oriented across the surface of said rock. Casts of Flabellophyton are composed of either inter-clasts and calcite cements, suggesting that Flabellophyton could be filled through the opening at the top of the organism when buried. Specimens from the Ediacara Member of the Rawnsley Quartzite also preserve in a similar manner in sandstones, instead being preserved via authigenic silica precipitation or authigenic pyrite precipitation due to overlying microbial matground after being cast by sand. This can also be seen occurring in specimens found in the Sonia Sandstone.

== Palaeoenvironment ==
The environments of Flabellophyton vary as much as the preservation. Specimens from the Lantian Formation are likely to have lived within a relatively quiet, deep-water sedimentary environment due to the orientation of the fossils. Meanwhile, specimens from the Dengying Formation are likely to a have lived in a more hydrodynamically energetic, shallow sub-tidal shelf environment, inferred from the preferred orientation of known fossil specimens Wutubus, which are noted to be erect benthic. Specimens from the Rawnsley Quartzite lived within a shallow-marine littoral environment. This slow migration from deeper to shallower waters echos a larger evolutionary-ecological shift in other Ediacaran fossils, where taxa that start out in deeper waters eventually end up in shallower waters, likely to have been influenced by temperature-dependant oxygen and demand. This also highlights Flabellophyton's unusual capability to adapt to different environemnts.
