= Lantianella =

Lantianella Temporal range: early Ediacaran ~602 Ma
- Fossil of Lantianella laevis

Scientific classification
- Kingdom: incertae sedis
- Genus: †Lantianella; Wan et al., 2016

Type species
- † Lantianella laevis Wan et al., 2016

Other species
- †Lantianella annularis Wan et al., 2016

Extinct genus of enigmatic conical fossils

Lantianella is an extinct, enigmatic fossil from the early Ediacaran, and was alive around 602 Ma in the Lantian Formation. It has an conical-shaped body, and is regarded as either a putative cnidarian-grade organism or an macro-algae. It contains two species, L. laevis and L. annularis.

== Discovery and naming ==
Fossils of Lantianella were first found and reported from the black shale "Member II" of the Lantian Formation in Xiuning County, Anhui Province of South China in 2011 as "Type A", and which were formally described and named in 2016.

The generic name Lantianella derives from the place name of Lantian, a town near to where the fossils were found. The specific name of L. laevis derives directly from the Latin word of the same spelling, "laevis", to mean "smooth", in reference to the smooth appearance of the fossils. The specific name of L. annularis derives directly from the Latin word of the same spelling, "annularis", in reference to the annulations up the body of the fossils.

== Description ==
Lantianella are centimetre-scale, conical-shaped fossils, which bear a globose holdfast structure at the base, and a crown of unbranching tentacles at the top opening. The body of the cone is commonly composed of longitudinal filaments or ribs, and sometimes bears transverse annulations. There are two species, with notably differences in appearance, which are as follows:

Reconstruction of Lantianella laevis

=== Lantianella laevis ===
Lantianella laevis has a globose to sub-tubular holdfast structure, which ranges between 2–4 mm (0.08–0.16 in) in diameter. The main conical body is flattened to a fan-shape in the rock and is composed of irregularly spaced longitudinal filaments or ribs, which are considerably denser at the base than the top, with a height ranging between 10–55 mm (0.4–2.2 in), and a maximum width of 3–15 mm (0.12–0.59 in) at the distal end. The distal end is likely either rounded or scalloped in nature, although this is noted to likely be the result of tectonic deformation. The filaments range between 0.3–0.8 mm (0.012–0.031 in).

Coming out from the top of the cone is a crown of 10 – 30 tentacle-like structures, which are 5–20 mm (0.20–0.79 in) in length and 0.2–0.7 mm (0.008–0.028 in) in width. These structures are ribbon-shaped, and were likely flexible in life, and bear no branching.

Reconstruction of L. annularis

=== Lantianella annularis ===
Lantianella annularis has a similar morphology to L. laevis, with the holdfast having a diameter of 2–3 mm (0.08–0.12 in), whilst the conical body is 10–30 mm (0.4–1.2 in) in height and 5–15 mm (0–1 in) in maximum width at the distal end. L. annularis differs from L. laevis in the presence of annulated bands up to 0.5–1 mm (0.020–0.039 in) in width along this conical body, which number between 5 – 12 in total, and are spaced 3–10 mm (0.12–0.39 in) from each other.

Coming out from the top of the cone is a crown of 10 or more tentacle-like structures, which are similar in appearance to L. laevis, being 5–20 mm (0.20–0.79 in) in length and 0.3–0.6 mm (0.012–0.024 in) in width.

== Affinities ==
Reconstruction of Lantianella laevis as a conulariid organism

When it was first described in 2016 by Wan et al., Lantianella was noted to be very similar in morphology to Flabellophyton, which could also be found within the same formation. They both have conical-shaped bodies composed of longitudinal filaments, are a relatively similar size to each other, and bear a globose holdfast at the base. It is thus noted that the only difference between the two is the presence of tentacle-like structures coming out of the top of Lantianella, which Flabellophyton does not have, and it is suggested that both could be close phylogenetically and that Flabellophyton could represent a younger or less complete fossil of Lantienella, whether the tentacles were undeveloped, retracted, or lost during burial. It is noted that if this can be proven to be the case, then Flabellophyton would take priority and require an emendation to its diagnosis to include the tentacle-like structures. Outside of this potential relation, it was also mentioned that conical-shaped bodies are not uncommon in the Ediacaran, being seen in fossils such as Thectardis, Protoconites, and Conotubus, and as such is also likely to be a result of convergent evolution.

In regards to its phylogenetic position, Wan et al. noted that Flabellophyton has been considered as a macro-algae, which could also mean that Lantianella could be regarded too as a macro-algae based on the aforementioned similar morphologies. The tentacles in this interpretation would likely be photosynthetic blades, similar to what is seen in the extant kelp species Postelsia palmaeformis or the extant dasycladalean genus Medusaegraptus. The other interpretation presented by Wan et al. is that of a cnidarian polyp, due to the noted similarities of the tentacle-like structures in Lantianella and the tentacles of cnidarians, and its not impossible for such structures to preserve. Wan et al. also noted that a study done on these fossils in 2013 by Van Iten et al. saw what would become Lantianella regarded as an early member of the clade Conulariida, which itself has been suggested to be related to the scyphozoans. Despite this, Wan et al. noted that no other specimens have been found with a pyramidal theca, and it is likely the pyramidal appearance of the specimen chosen by Van Iten et al. in 2013 was the result of differential preservation of the longitudinal filaments or ribs. Outside of this, the general morphology of Lantianella is not uncommon in cnidarians, with the longitudinal filaments or ribs possibly being muscles, similar to what is seen in Haootia from Newfoundland. Thus, Wan et al. regard Lantianella as enigmatic fossil with likely but unproven affinities to the cnidarians, with more study and material required to refine or reject this possible affinity.

The putative placement of Lantianella has been supported in subsequent papers, with some noting that if this is the case, then it would push back the evolution of macroscopic animals back into the early Ediacaran. Although some researchers regard Lantianella, and the rest of the putative cnidarians, as algal fossils, due to the fact that the basis of the cnidarian-grade affinity is predominately based on the gross morphology of the fossil material.

== See also ==
- List of Ediacaran genera
