= Piyuania =

Piyuania Temporal range: Early Ediacaran ~602 Ma
- Reconstruction of Piyuania cyathiformis

Scientific classification
- Kingdom: Animalia
- Phylum: Cnidaria (?)
- Genus: †Piyuania; Wan et al., 2016

Type species
- † Piyuania cyathiformis Wan et al., 2016

Extinct genus of cnidarian-grade cup-shaped fossils

Piyuania is an extinct, enigmatic fossil from the early Ediacaran, and was alive around 602 Ma in the Lantian Formation. It has an cyathiform- to cup-shaped body, and is regarded as a putative cnidarian-grade organism It is a monotypic genus, containing only Piyuania cyathiformis.

== Discovery and naming ==
Fossils of Piyuania were first found and reported from the black shale "Member II" of the Lantian Formation in Xiuning County, Anhui Province of South China in 2011 as "Type C" and "Type E", and which were formally described and named in 2016.

The generic name Piyuania derives from the place name of Piyuan, a town near to where the fossils were found. The specific name cyathiformis derives directly from the Latin word of the same spelling, "cyathiformis", in reference to the cup-shaped appearance of the fossils.

== Description ==
Piyuania cyathiformis are centimetre-scale, cyathiform- to cup-shaped fossils, which bear a 2–4 mm (0.079–0.157 in) wide globose holdfast structure at the base, and a small crown of unbranching tentacles inside the body on top. The body itself ranges between 15–50 mm (0.6–2.0 in) in height and 5–20 mm (0.20–0.79 in) at its widest point. Inside this body, referred to as the outer integument, completely envelopes a fusiform inner structure. The structure is darker than the surrounding integument, and is possibly composed of fine longitudinal filaments, ranging between 10–35 mm (0.4–1.4 in) in height and 1–5 mm (0.04–0.20 in) at its widest point. The filaments themselves are only roughly 0.2 mm (0.008 in) at their widest, which is best seen at the middle of the inner structure. At the top end of the inner structure there can be found 8 – 20 tentacle-like structures, which range between 5–15 mm (0.20–0.59 in) in width and 0.1–0.2 mm (0.004–0.008 in) in width. It is noted that the tentacle-like structures could be loose continuations of the filaments seen in the inner structure.

== Affinities ==
When the fossils were first reported by Yuan et al. in 2011, they had designated fossils of Piyuania as two separate types, "Type C" and "Type E". "Type C" fossils were regarded as cnidarian-like organisms, whilst "Type E" fossils were instead regarded as worm-like organisms. During collection of more fossil material, Wan et al. noted in 2016 that it became apparent that these two forms were of the same creature, with the two differing types likely being differently preserved specimens. Wan et al. supported the cnidarian affinity, based on the verification and description of the tentacle-like structures in the fossils, as well as the outer integument potentially being the hydrotheca, something seen in modern cnidarians.

Wan et al. would also note the similarities of Piyuania to an incomplete, doubled-walled conical specimen from the Miaohe biota of the Doushantuo Formation, which was compared to but not assigned to Protoconites. This fossil is 10 mm (0.4 in) in height and 2 mm (0.08 in), which is smaller than Piyuania, but its noted the outer wall appears similar to the outer integument, although the lack of filaments and a holdfast precludes any further comparisons. The putative placement of Piyuania as a cnidarian-grade organism has been supported in subsequent papers. Although some researchers regard Piyuania, and the rest of the putative cnidarians, as algal fossils, due to the fact that the basis of the cnidarian-grade affinity is predominately based on the gross morphology of the fossil material.

== See also ==
- List of Ediacaran genera
