= Boris Sokolov (geologist) =

- Борис Соколов
- Born: 9 April 1914; Vyshny Volochyok, Tver Governorate, Russian Empire
- Died: 2 September 2013 (aged 99); Moscow, Russia
- Citizenship: Soviet Union, Russian Federation
- Education: Leningrad University
- Awards: State Prize for 1967; Lomonosov Gold Medal (1997)
- Scientific career
- Fields: geology, paleontology
- Thesis: (1945)

Boris Sergeyevich Sokolov (Russian: Борис Серге́евич Соколов; April 9, 1914 – September 2, 2013) was a Soviet and Russian geologist and paleontologist. Sokolov authored reference works on the stratigraphy of Eastern Europe, in particular the fossil coral records, and created the concept of Vendian period, currently recognized as largely overlapping, but not fully equivalent to Ediacaran.

== Biography ==
Sokolov, the son of a village feldsher (medic), was born in Vyshny Volochyok. In 1931 he moved to Leningrad and became an apprentice electrician. A blue-collar work experience was a prerequisite for admission into the university. After a year of work Sokolov was allowed to enroll at the Department of Geology and Soil Sciences of Leningrad University. He graduated with honors in 1937 and remained there to take a course of postgraduate studies. Sokolov's early work concentrated on the stratigraphy of the Russian Platform, in particular the diagnostics of fossil corals for the identification of Carboniferous period deposits.

Shortly before the outbreak of World War II Sokolov was appointed to lead a Soviet field research company in China. After two years of field work in Tian Shan, the Turpan Depression and Tarim Basin (1941–1943) he returned to Soviet Central Asia to search for petroleum deposits on the northern side of Tian Shan. In 1945 he returned to Leningrad to complete his postgraduate thesis on Chaetetida, based on his pre-war studies. In 1950 he published Chaetetida of the Carboniferous Period, followed by five reference volumes of Paleozoan Tables (1951–1955). These works earned him his doctorate. A revised edition, included in the 16-volume Foundations of Paleontology, was awarded the State Prize for 1967.

In the early 1950s Sokolov joined a group of geologists tasked with the analysis of recent deep boring samples. Sokolov discovered what he believed was a hitherto unknown geographical layer preceding the Cambrian, which he called Vend (Vendian Period). The name Vend appeared in his papers from 1950; in 1952 academician Alexander Vinogradov endorsed Sokolov's theory and Vend appeared on Soviet geological charts as an independent period.

In 1958 Sokolov accepted an invitation to join the newly formed Siberian Division of the Academy of Sciences as a corresponding member, and moved to Novosibirsk. Together with Vladimir Saks (1911–1979) Sokolov created a new Siberian school of stratigraphy and paleontology, which survived into the 21st century as the Institute of Oil and Gas Geology. Sokolov continued production of geological references, but eventually concentrated on his theory of the transition from Vendian (Ediacaran) biota to Cambrian, which he believed was critical to our understanding of evolution. He coined the Russian term for Precambrian Paleontology (Палеонтология докембрия), which evolved into a separate branch of science.

Sokolov was elected to full membership of the Academy of Sciences of the USSR in 1968, and headed the Department of Geology of the Academy from 1975 to 1987, the longest tenure since the establishment of the Department. He chaired the International Stratigraphic Commission and the International Paleontology Association from 1972 until his death, and the national Paleontological Society from 1974 until his death. In 1998 Sokolov became the first geologist to be awarded the Lomonosov Gold Medal.
