= Wangjiawan =

Village in Hubei province, China

Map of China showing the GSSP location.

Wangjiawan (Chinese: 王家湾村; pinyin: Wangjiawan cun) is a village in the municipality of Fenxiang Town (Chinese: 分乡镇; pinyin: Fenxiang zhen) and part of the Yiling District (Chinese: 夷陵区), which itself is a part of the Yichang (Chinese: 宜昌市) of Hubei province.

== Geology ==
The geologic outcrop, the "Wangjiawan section" (Chinese: 王家湾剖面; pinyin: Wangjiawan poumian) it the official GSSP for the Hirnantian stage of the Upper Ordovician; it is located at 30°58′56″N 111°25′10″E.
