= Archaeolithophyllaceae =

Archaeolithophyllaceae Temporal range: Tournaisian –Mid Permian

Scientific classification
- Clade: Archaeplastida
- Division: Rhodophyta
- Class: Florideophyceae
- Stem group: Corallinales
- Family: †Archaeolithophyllaceae

Genera
- Archaeolithophyllum; Aseelahella; Kasimophyllum; Neoprincipia

Extinct family of algae

The Archaeolithophyllaceae are a family of algae that are thought to represent the stem lineage of the corallinaceae.

== See also ==
- Coralline algae#Evolution
- Other stem-group corallines:
  - Arenigiphyllum (Ordovician)
  - Petrophyton (Ordovician : Caradoc)
  - Graticula (Silurian : Wenlock)
  - Halysis (Ordovician)
  - Archaeolithophyllum (Pennsylvanian)
  - ?Maimonachaetetes (Mississippian)
  - ?Palaeoaplysina (Pennsylvanian – Permian; possibly an animal)
  - ? Solenoporaceae (Ordovician)
