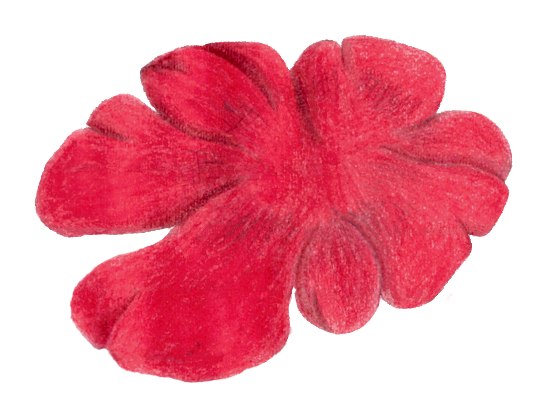
- Reconstruction of Ramathallus

Scientific classification
- Domain: Eukaryota
- Clade: Archaeplastida
- Division: Rhodophyta
- Class: Florideophyceae
- Genus: †Ramathallus; Bengston et al., 2017
- Species: †R. lobatus

Binomial name
- †Ramathallus lobatus Bengston et al., 2017

= Ramathallus =

Ramathallus Temporal range: Late Statherian, ~1600 Ma

Possible stem-group Rhodophyte

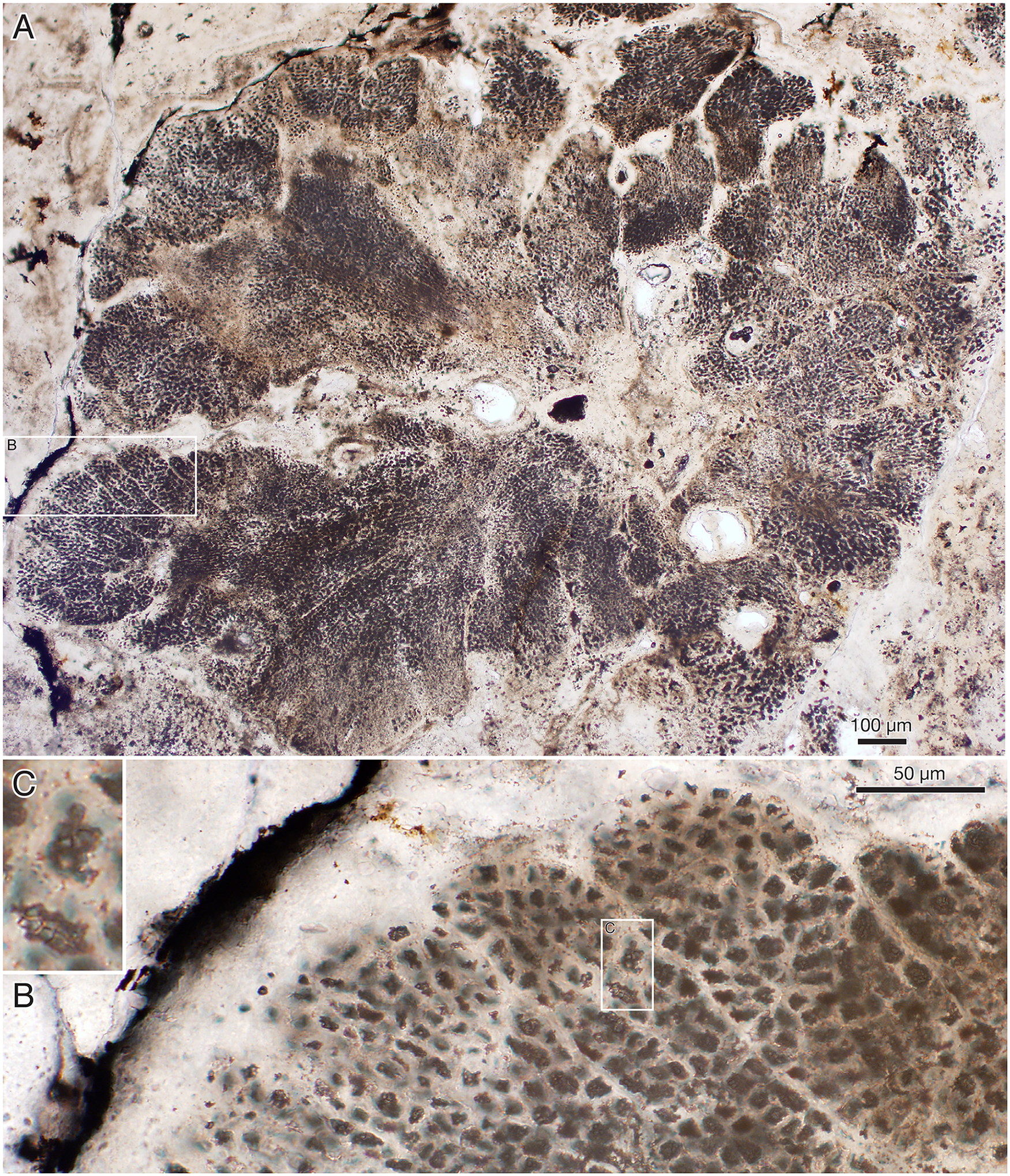
Thin section of holotype.

Ramathallus is a genus of sessile lobate alga that represents a probable stem-Rhodophyte from the Upper Statherian, 1600 Million years ago. The holotype of Ramathallus lobatus shows a cell structure with finger-like protrusions and a coating of non-cellular apatic. The cells have a dark granular material inside of them. The organism grew by apical growth and possessed pseudoparenchymatous thallus which in turn infer a possible affinity with the Florideophyceae. Many lobate protrusions radiated from the organisms centre composed out of pseudoparenchymatous tissue interpreted as "Cell fountains" made up of variably-sized cells. Ramathallus shares a close morphological similarity with the Ediacaran genera made up of pseudoparenchymatous, lobate fossils (Thallophyca, Thallophycoides, Paramecia and Gremiphyca) from the Doushantuo phosphorites of China .

== See also ==
- Proterozoic
- Red algae
- Rafatazmia
