= Principia (alga) =

Scientific classification
- Clade: Archaeplastida
- Division: Rhodophyta
- Class: Florideophyceae
- Stem group: Corallinales
- Family: †Archaeolithophyllaceae
- Genus: †Principia

Extinct genus of algae

Principia is a genus of alga that has been placed in the coralline stem group on the basis of its slightly differentiated thallus; it forms an "intermediate" between Hortonella, Neoprincipia and Archaeolithophyllum.
