= Halysis =

Halysis Temporal range: Mid Ordovician

Scientific classification
- Clade: Archaeplastida
- Division: Rhodophyta
- Class: Florideophyceae
- Stem group: Corallinales
- Genus: †Halysis; HØeg, 1932

Species
- H. moniliformis HØeg, 1932 (type); H. yui (Bian and Liu, 1999) Riding & BRaga, 2005

Extinct genus of algae

Halysis is a genus of red alga thought to fall in the coralline stem group. It has only been recovered in thin sections, and thus is only known in two dimensions; however, an interpretation as a sheet of cells rather than a sheet of tubes or a single row of cells is the most plausible.

== See also ==
- Coralline algae#Evolution
- Other stem-group corallines:
  - Arenigiphyllum (Ordovician)
  - Petrophyton (Ordovician : Caradoc)
  - Graticula (Silurian : Wenlock)
  - Halysis (Ordovician)
  - Archaeolithophyllum (Pennsylvanian)
  - ?Maimonachaetetes (Mississippian)
  - ?Palaeoaplysina (Pennsylvanian – Permian; possibly an animal)
  - ? Solenoporaceae (Ordovician)
