= Palaeoaplysina =

Palaeoaplysina Temporal range: Upper Carboniferous –Lower Permian

Scientific classification
- Clade: Archaeplastida
- Division: Rhodophyta
- Class: Florideophyceae
- Stem group: Corallinales
- Order: †Archaeolithophyllales (?)
- Family: †Palaeoaplysinaceae
- Genus: †Palaeoaplysina

Extinct genus of algae

Palaeoaplysina is a genus of tabular, calcified fossils that are a component of many Late Palaeozoic reefs. The fossil acted as a baffle to trap sediment. Historically interpreted as a sponge or hydrozoan, recent studies are converging to its classification in the coralline stem group, placing it among the red algae.

== Morphology ==
The thalloid organism had a series of internal canals opening on one side of the body (presumably the upper side), and volcano-like protuberances on that same side inviting comparison to filter-feeding organisms. On the other hand, it seems to have had a calcified cellular make up akin to that of the coralline reds, suggesting that it was either a stem-group coralline or a coralline-encrusted filter feeder.

== Distribution ==
The organism is widespread in the tropical and near-tropical margin of the Laurentian continent (45–15°N), but is not found elsewhere. Its oldest reported occurrence is Middle Pennsylvanian (mid- to late Moscovian) and youngest is the late Sakmarian. It acts as an important reservoir rock for oil deposits.

== See also ==
- Coralline algae#Evolution
- Other stem-group corallines:
  - Arenigiphyllum (Ordovician)
  - Petrophyton (Ordovician : Caradoc)
  - Graticula (Silurian : Wenlock)
  - Halysis (Ordovician)
  - Archaeolithophyllum (Pennsylvanian)
  - ?Maimonachaetetes (Mississippian)
  - ?Palaeoaplysina (Pennsylvanian – Permian; possibly an animal)
  - ? Solenoporaceae (Ordovician)
