= Lagerstätte =

Sedimentary deposit with well-preserved extraordinary fossils

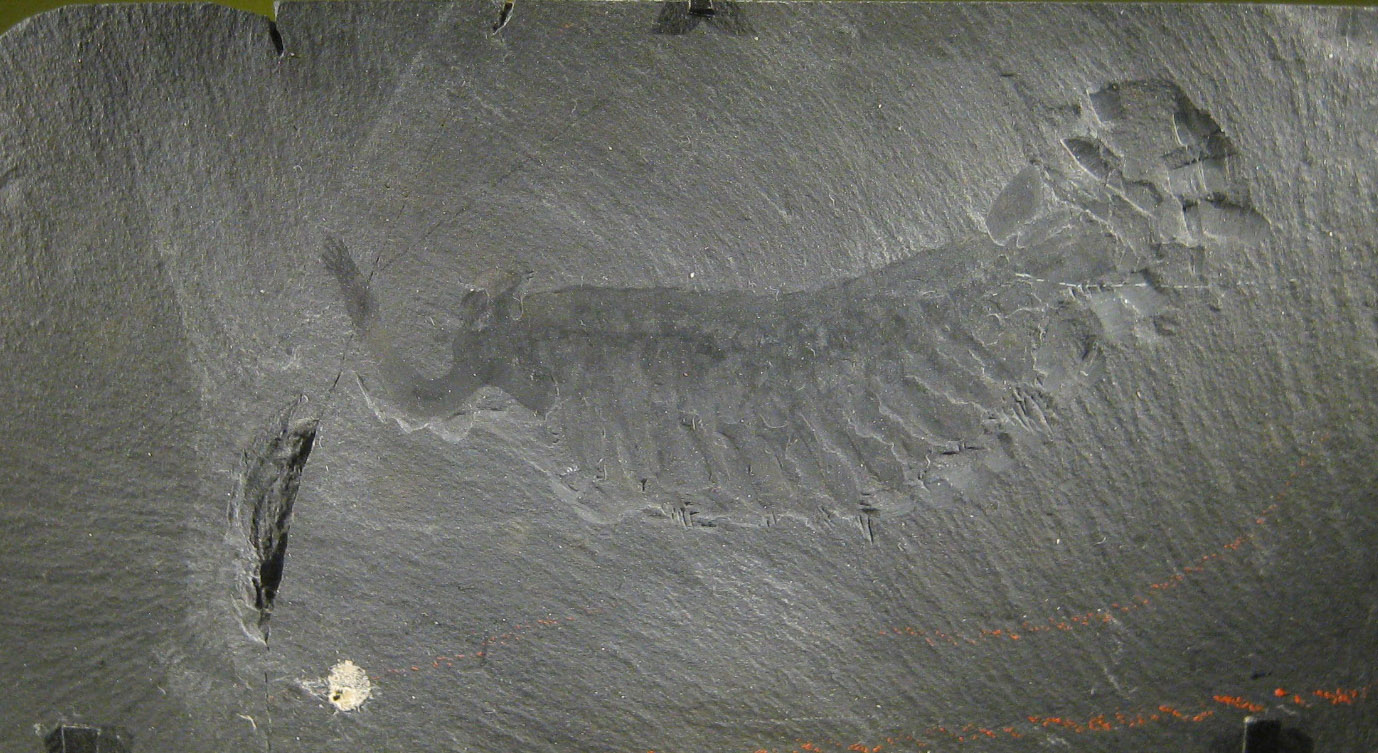
Well-preserved basal arthropod Opabinia from Burgess Shale Lagerstätte (Middle Cambrian)

A Fossil-Lagerstätte (German pronunciation: [ˈlaːɡɐˌʃtɛtə] – from Lager 'storage, lair' and Stätte 'place'; pl. Lagerstätten) is a sedimentary deposit that preserves an exceptionally high amount of palaeontological information. Konzentrat-Lagerstätten preserve a high concentration of fossils, while Konservat-Lagerstätten offer exceptional fossil preservation, sometimes including preserved soft tissues. Konservat-Lagerstätten may have resulted from carcass burial in an anoxic environment with minimal bacteria, thus delaying the decomposition of both gross and fine biological features until long after a durable impression was created in the surrounding matrix. Fossil-Lagerstätten span geological time from the Neoproterozoic era to the present.

Worldwide, some of the best examples of near-perfect fossilization are the Cambrian Maotianshan shales and Burgess Shale, the Ordovician Fezouata Biota, Beecher's Trilobite Bed, and Soom Shale, the Silurian Waukesha Biota, the Devonian Rhynie Chert, Hunsrück Slates, and Gogo Formation, the Carboniferous Mazon Creek, the Triassic Madygen Formation, the Jurassic Posidonia Shale and Solnhofen Limestone, the Cretaceous Yixian, Santana, and Agua Nueva formations and the Tanis Fossil Site, the Eocene Fur Formation, Green River Formation, Messel Formation and Monte Bolca, the Miocene Foulden Maar and Ashfall Fossil Beds, the Pliocene Gray Fossil Site, and the Pleistocene Naracoorte Caves and La Brea Tar Pits.

== Types ==
Palaeontologists distinguish two major kinds: (Note: Additionally, some authors have proposed the usage of a third type of Lagerstätten: "Liberation Lagerstätten". This proposed type of Lagerstätten has had little acknowledgement or acceptance within the rest of the literature, however. These sites are characterized by a potential high number of fossils and good preservation, but low-grade lithification. In other words, sites that undergone little diagenesis during the fossilization process.)

1. Konzentrat-Lagerstätten (concentration Lagerstätten) are deposits with a particular "concentration" of disarticulated organic hard parts, such as a bone bed. Their contents invariably display a large degree of time averaging, as the accumulation of bones in the absence of other sediment takes some time. Deposits with a high concentration of fossils that represent an in situ community, such as reefs or oyster beds, are not considered Lagerstätten.
2. Konservat-Lagerstätten (conservation Lagerstätten) are deposits known for the exceptional preservation of fossilized organisms or traces. The individual taphonomy of the fossils varies with the sites. Conservation Lagerstätten are crucial in elucidating important moments in the history and evolution of life. For example, the Burgess Shale of British Columbia is associated with the Cambrian explosion, and the Solnhofen limestone with the earliest known bird, Archaeopteryx.

== Preservation ==
Konservat-Lagerstätten preserve lightly sclerotized and soft-bodied organisms or traces of organisms that are not otherwise preserved in the usual shelly and bony fossil record; thus, they offer more complete records of ancient biodiversity and behavior and enable some reconstruction of the palaeoecology of ancient aquatic communities. In 1986, Simon Conway Morris calculated only about 14% of genera in the Burgess Shale had possessed biomineralized tissues in life. The affinities of the shelly elements of conodonts were mysterious until the associated soft tissues were discovered near Edinburgh, Scotland, in the Granton Lower Oil Shale of the Carboniferous. Information from the broader range of organisms found in Lagerstätten have contributed to recent phylogenetic reconstructions of some major metazoan groups. Lagerstätten seem to be temporally autocorrelated, perhaps because global environmental factors such as climate might affect their deposition.

A number of taphonomic pathways may produce Konservat-Lagerstätten:

- Phosphatization (replacing soft tissues with phosphate, such as Orsten-type and Doushantuo-type preservations).
- Silicification (replacing or entombing soft tissues with silica, such as petrified wood or Bitter Springs-type preservation).
- Kerogenization (soft tissues converted into inert carbonaceous films, as found in Burgess Shale-type preservation).
- Aluminosilification (replacing or coating soft tissues with films of aluminosilicate minerals).
- Pyritization (replacing soft tissues with pyrite, such as the exquisite detail found in Beecher's trilobite-type preservation).
- Calcification (replacing or soft tissues with calcite minerals).
- Siderite or calcite nodules (chemicals released by decaying soft tissue modify the surrounding sediment into a siderite concretion or coal ball encasing the fossil, as found in the Mazon Creek fossil beds).
- Rapid sediment cementation (impressions of soft tissue preserved through casts and molds in the surrounding sediment, such as Ediacaran-type preservation facilitated by microbial mats).
- Amber (soft tissues encased in hardened tree resin).

The identification of a fossil site as a Konservat-Lagerstätte may be based on a number of different factors which constitute "exceptional preservation". These may include the completeness of specimens, soft tissue preservation, fine-scale detail, taxonomic richness, distinctive taphonomic pathways (often multiple at the same site), the extent of the fossil layer in time and space, and particular sediment facies encouraging preservation.

== Examples ==
| Site(s) | Age | Location | Significance | Notable fossils/organisms |
|---|---|---|---|---|
| Doushantuo Formation | 600–555 Ma | Guizhou Province, China | Spans the poorly understood interval between the end of the Cryogenian period and the late Ediacaran Avalon explosion. | An Ediacaran embryo-like fossil |
| Mistaken Point (including the Drook, Briscal, Mistaken Point, Trepassey, and Fermeuse Formations.) | 565 Ma | Newfoundland, Canada | This site contains one of the most diverse and well-preserved collections of Precambrian fossils. | Frondose ediacaran organisms |
| Ediacara Hills | 555 Ma | South Australia | The type location the Ediacaran period, and has preserved a significant amount of fossils from that time. | Spriggina floundersi, a worm-like organism |
| Maotianshan Shales (Chengjiang) | 518 Ma | Yunnan, China | The preservation of an extremely diverse faunal assemblage renders the Maotianshan Shales the world's most important formation for understanding the evolution of early multi-cellular life. Microscopic animals like Yicaris are preserved here, showing the presence of an Orsten-type deposit within the formation. This site also includes the Xiazhuang biota. | Haikouichthys, a primitive craniate |
| Sirius Passet | 523-518 Ma | Greenland, Denmark | A site known for its fauna, and that they were most likely preserved by a death mask. It is a part of the larger Buen Formation, and has a fauna similar to the Maotianshan shales. | Kerygmachela, a lobopodian-like dinocaridid |
| Burgess Shale | 508 Ma | British Columbia, Canada | One of the most famous fossil localities in the world. It is famous for the exceptional preservation of the soft parts of its fossils. At 508 million years old (middle Cambrian), it is one of the earliest fossil beds containing soft-part imprints. | Anomalocaris, a predatory radiodont |
| Kinnekulle Orsten and Alum Shale | 500 Ma | Sweden | The Orsten sites reveals the oldest well-documented benthic meiofauna in the fossil record. Fossils such as microfossils of arthropods like free-living pentastomids are known. Multiple "Orsten-type" lagerstätten are also known from other countries. | Cambropachycope, a stem-group mandibulate arthropod |
| Fezouata Formation | about 485 Ma | Draa Valley, Morocco | It was deposited in a marine environment, and is known for its exceptionally preserved fossils, filling an important preservational window beyond the earlier and more common Cambrian Burgess shale-type deposits. | Aegirocassis, a giant hurdiid radiodont |
| Winneshiek Shale | 460 Ma | Decorah, Iowa, US | A Middle Ordovician site confined to a large impact Crater that is known for exceptionally exquisite preservation of conodonts, bivalved arthropods, and the earliest eurypterids in the fossil record. | Pentecopterus, the oldest known eurypterid |
| Beecher's Trilobite Bed | 460? Ma | New York, US | Noted exceptionally preserved trilobites with soft tissue preserved by pyrite replacement. Pyritisation allows the use of X-rays to study fine detail of preserved soft body parts. | A pair of Triarthrus trilobites with pyritized soft-tissue |
| Soom Shale | 450? Ma | South Africa | Known for its remarkable preservation of soft-tissue in fossil material. Deposited in still waters, the unit lacks bioturbation, perhaps indicating anoxic conditions. | Promissum, a conodont known from rare soft-tissues |
| Waukesha Biota (Brandon Bridge Formation) | ~435 Ma; Early Silurian | Wisconsin, US | Well-studied site known for the exceptional preservation of its diverse, soft-bodied and lightly skeletonized fauna, includes many major taxa found nowhere else in strata of similar age. It was one of the first fossil sites with soft bodied preservation known to science. | Parioscorpio, an enigmatic arthropod |
| Herefordshire Lagerstätte (Coalbrookdale Formation) | ~430 Ma | Herefordshire, UK | Known for the well-preserved fossils of various invertebrate animals many of which are in their three-dimensional structures. Fossils are preserved within volcanic ash, because of that sometimes this site has been compared to Pompeii. Some of the fossils are regarded as earliest evidences and evolutionary origin of some of the major groups of modern animals. | Offacolus, a euchelicerate |
| Bertie Group | 422.9-416 Ma | Ontario & New York State, Canada and US | This limestone have produced thousands of fossil eurypterids, such as giant Acutiramus and well-known Eurypterus, as well as other fauna like scorpions and fish. | Nerepisacanthus, an acanthodian |
| Rhynie chert | 400 Ma | Scotland, UK | The Rhynie chert contains exceptionally preserved plant, fungus, lichen and animal material (euthycarcinoids, branchiopods, arachnids, hexapods, etc.) preserved in place by an overlying volcanic deposit and hot springs. As well as one of the first known fully terrestrial ecosystems. | Asteroxylon, an early vascular plant related to lycopods |
| Hunsrück Slates (Bundenbach) | | Rheinland-Pfalz, Germany | The Hunsrück slates are one of the few marine Devonian lagerstätte having soft tissue preservation, and in many cases fossils are coated by a pyritic surface layer. | Schinderhannes bartelsi, the youngest known radiodont |
| Gogo Formation | 380 Ma (Frasnian) | Western Australia | The fossils of the Gogo Formation display three-dimensional soft-tissue preservation of tissues as fragile as nerves and embryos with umbilical cords. Over fifty species of fish have been described from the formation, and arthropods. | Materpiscis, a ptyctodontid placoderm fish that is the oldest vertebrate known to give live birth |
| Miguasha National Park (Escuminac Formation) | 370 Ma | Québec, Canada | Some of the fish, fauna, and spore fossils found at Miguasha are rare and ancient species. For example, Eusthenopteron is sarcopterygian that shares characters with early tetrapods. | Fossil of lungfish Scaumenacia and antiarch placoderm Bothriolepis |
| Waterloo Farm Lagerstätte (Witpoort Formation) | 360 Ma | South Africa | Important site that providing the only record of a high latitude (near polar) coastal ecosystem, overturning numerous assumptions about high latitude conditions during the latest Devonian. | Priscomyzon, the oldest known genus of lamprey |
| East Kirkton Quarry | 335 Ma | West Lothian, Scotland, UK | This site has produced numerous well-preserved fossils of early tetrapods like temnospondyls or reptiliomorphs, and large arthropods like scorpions or eurypterids. | Silvanerpeton, a possible reptiliomorph |
| Bear Gulch Limestone | 324 Ma | Montana, US | A limestone-rich geological lens in central Montana. It is renowned for its unusual and ecologically diverse fossil composition of chondrichthyans, the group of cartilaginous fish containing modern sharks, rays, and chimaeras. Other animals like brachiopods, ray finned fish, arthropods, and the possible mollusk Typhloesus are also known from the site. | Falcatus, a holocephalian which males had large fin spine |
| Joggins Fossil Cliffs (Joggins Formation) | 315 Ma | Nova Scotia, Canada | A fossil site that preserves a diverse terrestrial ecosystem consisting of plants like lycopsids, giant arthropods, fish, and the oldest known sauropsid, Hylonomus. | Hylonomus, the oldest known sauropsid in the fossil record |
| Mazon Creek | 310 Ma | Illinois, US | A conservation lagerstätte found near Morris, in Grundy County, Illinois. The fossils from this site are preserved in ironstone concretions with exceptional detail. The fossils were preserved in a large delta system that covered much of the area. The state fossil of Illinois, the enigmatic animal Tullimonstrum, is only known from these deposits. | Tullimonstrum, an enigmatic animal |
| Montceau-les-Mines | 300 Ma | France | Exceptional preservation of Late Carboniferous fossil biota are known, including various vertebrates and arthropods, as well as plants. | Idmonarachne, an arachnid that is related to spiders |
| Chemnitz petrified forest | 291 Ma | Saxony, Germany | A petrified forest in Germany that is composed of Arthropitys bistriata, a type of Calamites, giant horsetails that are ancestors of modern horsetails, found on this location with never seen multiple branches. Many more plants and animals from this excavation are still in an ongoing research. | Large trunks of Arthropitys at Chemnitz |
| Kupferschiefer | 259–255 Ma | (North-Central Europe) Denmark, Germany, Lithuania, Netherlands, Poland, Russia | This site deposited in an open marine and shallow marine environment provides fossils of reptiles as well as many fish. | Weigeltisaurus, gliding weigeltisaurid reptile |
| Luoping Biota (Guanling Formation) | ~247-245 Ma | Yunnan, China | Various marine animals are preserved in this site, showing how marine ecosystem recovered after Permian extinction. | Barracudasauroides, an ichthyosaur preserved in articulation from the Guanling Formation |
| Grès à Voltzia | 245 Ma | France | A fossil site which have various arthropods as well as other fauna, remarkable for its detailed myriapod specimens. It also contains the earliest known aphid fossils. | Skull of Mirasaura, a reptile with large dorsal crest over its back |
| Besano Formation | 242 Ma | Alps, Italy and Switzerland | This formation is designated as a World Heritage Site, as it is famous for its preservation of Middle Triassic marine life including fish and aquatic reptiles. | Cymbospondylus, one of the many marine reptile specimens preserved in articulation from the Besano Formation |
| Madygen Formation | 230 Ma | Kyrgyzstan | The Madygen Formation is renowned for the preservation of more than 20,000 fossil insects, making it one of the richest Triassic lagerstätten in the world. Other vertebrate fossils as fish, amphibians, reptiles and synapsids have been recovered from the formation too, as well as minor fossil flora. | A cast of the holotype of Sharovipteryx, a well-preserved gliding reptile |
| Cow Branch Formation | 230 Ma | Virginia, US | This site preserves a wide variety of organisms (including Fish, reptiles, arachnids, and insects). | Mecistotrachelos, a gliding reptile distantly related to archosauromorphs, like crocodylians and dinosaurs |
| Holzmaden/Posidonia Shale | 183 Ma | Württemberg, Germany | The Sachrang member is among the most important formations of the Toarcian boundary, due to the concentrations of exceptionally well-preserved complete skeletons of fossil marine fish and reptiles. It was also deposited during the TOAE. | A specimen of the ichthyosaur Stenopterygius crassicostatus with preserved young |
| La Voulte-sur-Rhône | 160 Mya | Ardèche, France | La Voulte-sur-Rhône, in the Ardèche region of southwestern France, offers paleontologists an outstanding view of an undisturbed paleoecosystem that was preserved in fine detail. Notable finds include retinal structures in the eyes of thylacocephalan arthropods, and fossilized relatives of the modern day vampire squid, like Vampyronassa rhodanica. | A rare well-preserved cephalopod, Rhomboteuthis |
| Karabastau Formation | 155.7 Ma | Kazakhstan | This site is an important locality for insect fossils that has been studied since the early 20th century, alongside the rarer remains of vertebrates, including pterosaurs, salamanders, lizards and crocodiles. | Sordes, small pterosaur with visible soft-tissues preserved |
| Tiaojishan Formation | 165-153 Ma | Liaoning Province, China | It is known for its exceptionally preserved fossils, including those of plants, insects and vertebrates. It is made up mainly of pyroclastic rock interspersed with basic volcanic and sedimentary rocks. Forms a part of the Yanliao Biota. | Anchiornis, small feathered anchiornithid dinosaur |
| Solnhofen Archipelago Lagerstätten (including the Altmühltal, Painten, Torleite, and Mörnsheim Formations) | 149-148 Ma | Bavaria, Germany | This site is unique as it preserves a rare assemblage of fossilized organisms, including highly detailed imprints of soft bodied organisms such as sea jellies. The most familiar fossils of the Solnhofen Plattenkalk include the early feathered theropod dinosaur Archaeopteryx preserved in such detail that they are among the most famous and most beautiful fossils in the world. | The Berlin Specimen of Archaeopteryx lithographica |
| Las Hoyas | about 125 Ma (Barremian) | Cuenca, Spain | The site is mostly known for its exquisitely preserved dinosaurs, especially enantiornithines. The lithology of the formation mostly consists of lacustarine limestone deposited in a freshwater wetland environment. | Concornis, an early enantiornithean |
| Jehol Biota | 125–119 Ma | Northeast China | Contains at minimum the Yixian and Jiufotang formations, probably also the Dabeigou, Huajiying, and maybe the Sinuiju series of North Korea. This biota is known for its exceptional preservation of dinosaurs, pterosaurs, fish, insects and other animals within a high altitude lake with periodic volcaniclastics from nearby volcanoes. | Sinosauropteryx, the first non-avain dinosaur with evidence of feathers to have been recognized |
| Santana Group | 113-92 Ma | northeast Brazil | Contains the Crato and Romualdo Formations Both sites are known for their exceptional preservation of pterosaurs, fish, invertebrates, and plants from a lake environment. | Tupandactylus, a fossil pterosaur that was preserved with feathers and other soft tissues intact |
| Sannine Formation (Haqel, Hjoula, and al-Nammoura lagerstätten) | 95-94 Ma | Lebanon | Famous Lebanese konservat-lagerstätten of the Late Cretaceous (middle to late Cenomanian) age, which contain a well-preserved variety of different fossils. Small animals like shrimp, octopus, stingrays, and bony fishes are common finds at these sites. Some of the rarest fossils from this locality include those of octopuses. | Ichthyoceros, a pycnodont actinopterygian |
| Burmese amber | 101-99 Ma (latest Albian/earliest Cenomanian) | Myanmar | More than 1,000 species of taxa have been described from ambers from Hukawng Valley. While it is important for understanding the evolution of biota, mainly insects, during the Cretaceous period, it is also extremely controversial by facing ethical issues due to its association with conflicts and labor conditions. | Oculudentavis, small-sized lizard |
| London Clay | 54–48 Ma | England, UK | Collected for close to 300 years, Plant fossils, especially seeds and fruits, are found in abundance. Some 350 named species of plant have been found, making the London Clay flora one of the world's most diverse for fossil seeds and fruits. The flora includes tropical taxa found in modern Asia, reflecting the much warmer climate of the early Eocene. Also is considered a potential "Liberation lagerstätte"^{see notes} | Brychaetus muelleri, fish skull |
| Green River Formation | 50 Ma | Colorado/Utah/Wyoming, US | An Eocene aged site that is noted for the fish fauna preserved. Other fossils include the crocodilians, birds, and mammals. | Diplomystus and Knightia |
| Monte Bolca | 50-49 Ma | Verona, Italy | A fossil site with specimens of fish and other organisms that are so highly preserved that their organs are often completely intact in fossil form, and even the skin color can sometimes be determined. It is assumed that mud at the site was low in oxygen, preventing both decay and the mixing action of scavengers from harming the fossils. | A complete Archaeophis proavus |
| Messel Formation | 47 Ma | Hessen, Germany | This site has significant geological and scientific importance. Over 1000 species of plants and animals have been found at the site. After almost becoming a landfill, strong local resistance eventually stopped these plans and the Messel Pit was declared a UNESCO World Heritage Site on 9 December 1995. Significant scientific discoveries about the early evolution of mammals and birds are still being made at the Messel Pit, and the site has increasingly become a tourist site as well. | Masillamys sp., an ischyromyid rodent |
| Baltic amber | 47-35 Ma (Lutetian to Priabonian) | Pomeranian Voivodeship, Poland & Kaliningrad Oblast, Russia | The largest amber deposit on Earth, this amber is part of the Prussian Formation, and preserves a high diversity of exceptionally well-preserved fossil invertebrates, plants, and small vertebrates that inhabited eastern Europe during the warmer, subtropical conditions of the middle Eocene. It is the largest world's single largest repository of fossil insects. | Yantarogekko, a gecko |
| Riversleigh | 25–5.33 Ma | Queensland, Australia | This locality is recognised for the series of well preserved fossils deposited from the Late Oligocene to the late Miocene. The fossiliferous limestone system is located near the Gregory River in the north-west of Queensland, an environment that was once a very wet rainforest that became more arid as the Gondwanan land masses separated and the Australian continent moved north. | Reconstruction of the diprotodont marsupial Nimbadon lavarackorum. |
| Shanwang Formation | 18-17 Ma | Shandong Province, China | Fossils have been found at this site in dozens of categories, representing over 600 separate species. Animal fossils include insects, fish, spiders, amphibians, reptiles, birds and mammals. Insect fossils have clear, intact veins. Some have retained beautiful colours. | Fossil of Lusorex |
| Pisco Formation | 15-2 Ma | Arequipa & Ica, Peru | Several specialists consider the Pisco Formation one of the most important lagerstätten, based on the large amount of exceptionally preserved marine fossils, including sharks (most notably megalodon), penguins, whales, dolphins, birds, marine crocodiles and aquatic giant sloths. | Reconstruction of the macroraptorial stem-physeteroid whale Acrophyseter. |
| Ashfall Fossil Beds | 11.83 Ma | Nebraska, US | The Ashfall Fossil Beds of Antelope County in northeastern Nebraska are rare fossil sites of the type called lagerstätten that, due to extraordinary local conditions, capture an ecological "snapshot" in time of a range of well-preserved fossilized organisms. Ash from a Yellowstone hotspot eruption 10-12 million years ago created these fossilized bone beds. | A bone-bed containing the fossils of the basal rhino Teleoceras and the three-toed horse Cormohipparion. |
| Gray Fossil Site | 4.9-4.5 Ma | Tennessee, US | As the first site of its age known from the Appalachian region, the Gray Fossil Site is a unique window into the past. Research at the site has yielded many surprising discoveries, including new species of red panda, rhinoceros, pond turtle, hickory tree, and more. The site also hosts the world's largest known assemblage of fossil tapirs. | Fossil skull of Pristinailurus, a North American relative of the modern Red Panda |
| The Mammoth Site | 26 Ka | South Dakota, US | The facility encloses a prehistoric sinkhole that formed and was slowly filled with sediments during the Pleistocene era. As of 2016, the remains of 61 mammoths, including 58 North American Columbian and 3 woolly mammoths had been recovered. Mammoth bones were found at the site in 1974, and a museum and building enclosing the site were established. | Fossil skeleton of Arctodus simus, a large species of "short-faced" bear that was one of North America's largest predators during the Pleistocene. |
| Rancho La Brea Tar Pits | 40–12 Ka | California, US | A group of tar pits where natural asphalt (also called asphaltum, bitumen, or pitch; brea in Spanish) has seeped up from the ground for tens of thousands of years. Over many centuries, the bones of trapped animals have been preserved. Among the prehistoric species associated with the La Brea Tar Pits are Pleistocene mammoths, dire wolves, short-faced bears, American lions, ground sloths, and, the state fossil of California, the saber-toothed cat (Smilodon fatalis). | Fossil skeleton of Mammuthus columbi excavated from the tar pits |
| Naracoorte Caves | 500-1 Ka | South Australia, Australia | A series of caves that preserve numerous pleistocene megafauna, like Thylacoleo, and is recognized as a World heritage site alongside the older, but geographically similar Riversleigh site. | Skeleton of Thylacoleo at the Naracoorte Caves |

== See also ==
- List of fossil sites (with link directory)
- Bog body, modern human remains similarly exceptionally preserved within peat bogs, useful for similar reasons within the field of archaeology.
- Hoard, a concentration of human artifacts useful for similar reasons in archaeology
