= Doushantuo Formation =

Fossil formation in south-central China

- Stratigraphic range: Ediacaran; ~635–551 Ma
- A purported Ediacaran embryo contained within an acritarch from the Doushantuo Formation
- Underlies: Dengying Formation
- Overlies: Nantuo Formation
- Thickness: Up to 400 m; usually around 200 to 250 m

Lithology
- Primary: Shale
- Other: Mudstone, marl, carbonate or phosphate minerals

Location
- Region: South China
- Country: China

Type section
- Named for: Doushantuo, Hubei
- Named by: Li Siguang and Zhao Yazeng
- Year defined: 1924

The Doushantuo Formation (formerly transcribed as Toushantuo or Toushantou, from Chinese: 陡山沱; pinyin: dǒu shān tuó; lit. 'steep mountain bay') is a geological formation in western Hubei, eastern Guizhou, southern Shaanxi, central Jiangxi, and other localities in China. It is known for the fossil Lagerstätten in Zigui in Hubei, Xiuning in Anhui, and Weng'an in Guizhou, as one of the oldest beds to contain minutely preserved microfossils, phosphatic fossils that are so characteristic they have given their name to "Doushantuo type preservation". The formation, whose deposits date back to the Early and Middle Ediacaran, is of particular interest because it covers the poorly understood interval of time between the end of the Cryogenian geological period and the more familiar fauna of the Late Ediacaran Avalon explosion, as well as due to its microfossils' potential utility as biostratigraphical markers. Taken as a whole, the Doushantuo Formation ranges from about 635 Ma (million years ago) at its base to about 551 Ma at its top, with the most fossiliferous layer predating by perhaps five Ma the earliest of the 'classical' Ediacaran faunas from Mistaken Point on the Avalon Peninsula of Newfoundland, and recording conditions up to a good forty to fifty million years before the Cambrian explosion at the beginning of the Phanerozoic.

== Sedimentology ==
The whole sequence sits on an unconformity with the underlying Liantuo formation, which is free of fossils, an unconformity usually being interpreted as a period of erosion. On that unconformity lie tillites of the Nantuo formation - cemented glacial till formed of glacial deposits of cobbles and gravel laid down at the end of the Marinoan glaciation (also known as Varangian glaciation, this is the second and last of a series of very extensive glaciations during a period called the Cryogenian—named because 'Snowball Earth' conditions at the time). This latest Cryogenian glacial level is tentatively dated ca 654 (660 ± 5) — 635 Ma (million years ago).

The Doushantuo formation itself has three layers representing aquatic sediments that formed as sea levels rose with the melting of worldwide glaciation. Biomarkers indicate highly saline conditions, such as might be found in a lagoon, low oxygen levels, and very little sediment that had been washed off land surfaces.

The richest finds (the Lagerstätte itself) lie at the bottom of the middle stratum, with a date about 570 Ma, thus from some time after the great Gaskiers glaciation of [585 ± 1 - 582.1 ± 0.4 Ma].

== Fossils ==
Systematic reconstruction of the Ancanping assemblage from the Doushanuo Formation in South China

Doushantuo fossils are all aquatic, microscopic, and preserved to a great degree of detail. The latter two characteristics mean that the structure of the organisms that made them can be studied at the cellular level, and considerable insight has been gained into the embryonic and larval stages of many early creatures. One contentious claim is that many of the fossils show signs of bilateral symmetry, a common feature in many modern-day animals which is usually assumed to have evolved later, during the Cambrian Explosion. A nearly microscopic fossil animal, Vernanimalcula ("springtime micro-animal") was announced in October 2005, with the claim that it was the oldest known bilateral animal. However, the absence of adult forms of almost all animal types in the Doushantuo (there are microscopic adult sponges and corals) makes these claims difficult to prove: some argue that their lack suggests these finds are not larval and embryonic forms at all; supporters contend that some unidentified process "filtered out" all but the smallest forms from fossilization. An alternative interpretation suggests that it was created by non-biological rock-forming processes. The team that discovered Vernanimalcula have defended their conclusion that it was an animal, pointing out that they found ten specimens (not illustrated) of the same size and configuration, and stating that non-biological processes would be very unlikely to produce so many specimens that were so alike.

The discovery was made when the rich phosphate deposits were being mined, and was first reported in 1998. The finds offer direct evidence that confirms expectations that major evolutionary diversification of animals already had occurred before the onset of the Cambrian period, with its apparent 'explosion' of metazoan life-forms and, therefore, that more remote ancestral forms of the phyla recognizable in Cambrian macrofossils must have existed previously.

The documented biota now includes phosphatized microfossils of algae, multicellular thallophytes (seaweeds), acritarchs, ciliates, and cyanophytes, besides adult sponges and adult cnidarians (coelenterates; these may be early forms of tabulate corals (tetracorallians)). There also seem to be what scientists cautiously report as bilateral animal embryos, termed Parapandorina, and eggs (Megasphaera). Some of the possible animal embryos are in an early stage of cellular division (that was first interpreted as spores or algal cells), including eggs and embryos which are most probably of sponges or cnidarians, as well as adult sponges and a variety of adult cnidarians.

An alternative possibility is that the "embryos" and "eggs" are in fact fossils of giant sulfur bacteria resembling Thiomargarita, a bacterium so large that it is visible to the naked eye. The interpretation would also provide a mechanism for phosphatic fossilization through microbially mediated phosphate precipitation by the bacteria, which has been observed in modern environments. If dark spots in the fossil transpire to be fossilised nuclei - an unlikely claim - this would refute the Thiomargarita hypothesis. That being said, recent comparisons of the Doushantuo fossils to modern decaying Thiomargarita and expired sea urchin embryos shows little similarity between the fossils and decaying bacterial cells.

Only about one-twentieth of the site's fossils have been excavated. The fossil beds are threatened by increasing intensity of phosphate mining operations in the area. A workshop led in protest by local paleontologists resulted in a temporary halt to the mining in 2017.

== Paleobiota ==
While here they are placed in the Doushantuo Formation, most of the algae are found in the Miaohe biota, which may instead belong to the lower part of the Dengying Formation. There can also be found closer to the base of the Ancanping section of the formation an early Ediacaran assemblages of microfossils and sparse macrofossils, which have been dated to roughly 620 - 610 Ma, making the macrofossils of this assemblage considerablly older than the macrofossils Lantian Formation at 602 Ma.

Color key
Taxon	Reclassified taxon	Taxon falsely reported as present	Dubious taxon or junior synonym	Ichnotaxon	Ootaxon	Morphotaxon

Notes
Uncertain or tentative taxa are in small text; ~~crossed out~~ taxa are discredited.

=== Algae ===
Algae
Genus	Species	Higher taxon	Notes	Images
Anhuiphyton	A. lineatum	Eukaryota	Essentially identical to specimens from the Lantian Formation	
Anomalophyton	A. zhangzhongyingi	Eukaryota	Similar to Doushantuophyton, but branches less frequently	
Baculiphyca	B. taeniata, B. brevistipitata	Eukaryota	Species differ in stipe length	Baculiphyca taeniata from the Tongshan Lagerstätte, Dengying Formation, China
Beltanelliformis	B. brunsae	Cyanobacteria	Originally interpreted as a polypoid cnidarian	Beltanelliformis fossil from Ukraine
Crassitubus	C. costata	Cyanobacteria	Originally interpreted as a tubular animal, before being reinterpreted as a cyanobacterium	
Chuaria	Chuaria sp.	Macroalgae	Enigmatic fossil, possibly synonymous with Tawuia.	Chuaria from the Ancanping assemblage of the Doushantuo Formation
Cobios	C. rubro	Rhodophyta	Preserves evidence of multiple life stages	
Doushantuophyton	D. lineare, D. rigidulum, D. quyuani, D. cometa, D. laticladus	Eukaryota	Relatively small and thin	Doushantuophyton lineare from the Ancanping assemblage of the Doushantuo Formation
Enteromorphites	E. siniansis, E. magnus	Eukaryota	One of the larger "branching algae" from Doushantuo	Enteromorphites siniansis from the Ancanping assemblage of the Doushantuo Formation
Gemmaphyton	G. taoyingensis	Eukaryota	Bears a very long stipe and round holdfast	
Globusphyton	G. lineare	Eukaryota	Fairly unusual morphology suggests it likely crept along the seafloor	
Glomulus	G. filamentum	Cyanobacteria	Resembles modern cyanobacteria like Microcoleus	Line drawing of Glomulus filamentum
Gremiphyca	G. corymbiata	Rhodophyta	Likely a stem-rhodophyte, resembles coralline algae	
Grypania	G. spiralis	Eukaryota?	One of the most common large Proterozoic fossils	Grypania fossils from the Negaunee Iron Formation in the USA
Jiuqunaoella	J. simplicis	Eukaryota	Resembles Grypania, but differs in presence of constrictions	
Jixiania	J. lineata	Eukaryota?	Also known from the Mesoproterozoic, probably a filamentous alga	
Konglingiphyton	K. erecta, K. laterale	Rhodophyta?	Likely a rhodophyte, a formerly separate genus ("Ramalga") was actually a specimen of this genus overlaid by one of Doushantuophyton	Konglingiphyton erecta from the Ancanping assemblage of the Doushantuo Formation
Latiortenuiphyton	L. robusta	Eukaryota	Has large vein-like structures in its thallus	
Liulingjitaenia	L. alloplecta	Eukaryota	Unusually consists of a set of braided filaments	Line drawing of Liulingjitaenia alloplecta
Longfengshania	Longfengshania sp.	Macroalgae	Balloon-shaped macroalgae.	Longfengshania from the Ancanping assemblage of the Doushantuo Formation
Longifuniculum	L. dissolutum	Eukaryota	Similar to Liulingjitaenia, but its filaments fray out at each end almost like a braided rope	Line drawing of Longifuniculum dissolutum
Maxiphyton	M. stipitatum	Eukaryota	Has an unusually thick stipe	Maxiphyton stipitatum from the Ancanping assemblage of the Doushantuo Formation
Megaspirellus	M. houi	Eukaryota	Holotype reinterpreted as a coprolite due to sediment grains	
Miaohephyton	M. bifurcatum	Phaeophyta?	Fossils likely represent shed fragments from larger thalli	Line drawing reconstruction of Miaohephyton bifurcatum
Paramecia	P. incognata	Corallinales?	Formerly interpreted as a marine lichen	
Paratetraphycus	P. gigantea	Bangiophyceae?	Resembles early developmental stages of the alga Porphyra	
Pseudodoushantuophyton	P. wenghuiensis	Eukaryota	Bears cluster-like filaments on its branches	
Quadratitubus	Q. orbigoniatus	Cyanobacteria	Originally interpreted as a tubular animal, before being reinterpreted as a cyanobacterium	
Ramitubus	R. increscens, R. decrescens	Eukaryota	Originally interpreted as a tubular animal, then found to be an alga similar to Epiphyton	
Sinocylindra	S. linearis, S. yunnanensis	Eukaryota	Resembles the cyanobacteria Siphonophycus	S. yunnanensis fossil from the Chengjiang biota
Sinocyclocyclicus	S. guizhouensis	Cyanobacteria	Formerly thought to be a larval or tube-dwelling metazoan alongside other tubular microfossils	
Siphonophycus	S. solidum, S. septatum, S. kestron, S. typicum, S. robustum	Cyanobacteria	Relatively common cyanobacteria	Line drawing reconstruction of Siphonophycus attenuatum
Thallophyca	T. corrugata	Rhodophyta	Resembles the Solenoporaceae	
Thallophycoides	T. phloeatus	Eukaryota	May be a rhodophyte?	
Tongrenphyton	T. komma	Eukaryota	Has several filaments along its thallus, showing a clear eukaryotic affinity	
Vendotaenia	V. sp	Vendotaenid	Resembles specimens from the lower Cambrian	Indeterminate vendotaenid fossil
Vendotaenids	???	Macroalgae	Ribbon-like macroalgae.	
Wengania	W. globosa, W. exquisita, W. minuta	Eukaryota	Resembles various algae in its parenchymatous structure, especially green algae	
Zunyiphyton-like filaments	???	Macroalgae	A fossil of tangled filaments, bearing similarities to the macroalgae fossil Zunyiphyton.	A Zunyiphyton-like fossil from the Ancanping assemblage of the Doushantuo Formation

=== Microorganisms ===
Microorganisms
Genus	Species	Higher taxon	Notes	Images
Aggregatosphaera	A. miaoheensis	Eukaryota?	Spheroidal cell clusters with similarities to algal cysts	
Annularidens	A. inconditus	Acritarch	Bears numerous hollow processes on its outer surface, giving it a gearwheel-like appearance in cross-section	
Apodastoides	A. basileus	Acritarch	Bears processes with plugs at their base	
Appendisphaera	A. anguina, A. clava, A. grandis, A. fragilis, A. longispina, A. setosa, A. tabifica, A. tenuis, A. helicaea, A. brevispina, A. hemisphaerica	Acritarch	Bears numerous long, flexible processes	
Archaeophycus	A. yunnanensis	Eukaryota?	Either a cyanobacteria or the early developmental stage of an alga	
Asterocapsoides	A. sinicus	Acritarch	Original holotype was damaged by the surrounding rock breaking	
Bacatisphaera	B. baokangensis	Acritarch	Bears large pimple-like processes	
Baltisphaeridium	B. rigidum	Acritarch	Bears short, triangular processes	
Briareus	B. borealis, B. robustus	Acritarch		
Bispinosphaera	B. vacua	Acritarch	Bears two separate types of process; one is conical and hollow, the other is solid and hair-like	
Botominella	B. lineata	Eukaryota?	Known from small trichome-like structures	
Castaneasphaera	C. speciosa	Acritarch	Resembles Phanerozoic "mazuelloids"	
Cavaspira	C. acuminata, C. basiconica	Acritarch	Bears short, conical processes	
Cerionopora	C. ordinata	Acritarch	May be a resting cyst of a multicellular alga	
Comasphaeridium	C. magnum	Acritarch	Bears long hair-like processes	
Crassimembrana	C. crispans, C. multitunica	Acritarch	Bears a thick vesicle wall	
Cyanonema	C. attenuatum	Cyanobacteria	Similar to forms from the Bitter Springs formation	
Cymatiosphaeroides	C. forabilatus, C. yinii	Acritarch	Similar to Membranosphaera, bears cylindrical processes with pointed tips	
Dicrospinasphaera	D. zhangii	Acritarch	Bears thin, branching processes	
Dictyotidium	D. grazhdankinii	Acritarch		
Distosphaera	D. jinguadunensis, D. speciosa	Acritarch	Bears two layers of cylindrical processes	
Doushantuonema	D. peatii	Cyanobacteria	Earliest reported cyanobacteria from the formation	
Duospinosphaera	D. shennongjiaensis, D. biformis	Acritarch	Bears two layers of processes; an inner cylindrical one likened to hanging icicles and a larger conical one on the outer wall	
Echinosphaeridium	E. maximum	Acritarch	Formerly placed in Ericiasphaera due to a misinterpretation of the spines as solid	
Eotylotopalla	E. apophysa, E. dactylos, E. delicata, E. quadrata, E. strobilata	Acritarch	Formerly placed within Timanisphaera	Eotylotopalla quadrata from the Ancanping assemblage of the Doushantuo Formation
Ericiasphaera	E. fibrila, E. magna, E. rigida?, E. densispina, E. sparsa	Acritarch	Bears dense cylindrical processes, badly preserved acritarchs likely belonging to this genus were misinterpreted as ciliates	
Goniosphaeridium	G. acuminatum, G. conoideum, G. cratum	Acritarch	Similar to Baltisphaeridium	
Granitunica	G. mcfaddenae	Acritarch	Differs from other sphaeromorph acritarchs in its granular wall	
Hocosphaeridium	H. dilatatum, H. scaberfacium	Acritarch	Bears numerous hooked processes	
Knollisphaeridium	K. maximum, K. coniformum, K. denticulatum, K. longilatum, K. obtusum, K. parvum	Acritarch	Bears conical processes with a long filament-like tip	
Leiosphaeridia	L. tenuissima, L. crassa, L. minutissima	Acritarch	Incredibly abundant	
Megasphaera	M. inornata, M. ornata	Protista	Thought represent an animal egg, then revealed to likely be an encysting protist	Megasphaera ornata from the Ancanping assemblage of the Doushantuo Formation
Meghystricosphaeridium	M. chadianensis, M?. densum, M. gracilentum, M. perfectum, M. magnificum, M. wenganensis	Acritarch	Somewhat unclear which species belong to this genus	
Mengeosphaera	M. angusta?, M. chadianensis, M. constricta, M. gracilis, M. mamma, M. minima, M. stegosauriformis, M. bellula, M. cuspidata, M. grandispina, M. latibasis, M. spicata, M. spinula, M. triangula, M. uniformis, M. membranifera, M. exomembrana	Acritarch	The species M. stegosauriformis is named after the dinosaur Stegosaurus, due to the acritarch's processes resembling the dinosaur's plates in shape	
Obruchevella	O. minor	Cyanobacteria	Relatively rare	
Oscillatoriopsis	O. amadeus, O. longa, O. obtusa, O. majuscula	Cyanobacteria	Common cyanobacterial genus	Line drawing reconstruction of Oscillatoriopsis
Osculosphaera	O. arcelliformis, O. hyalina, O. membranifera	Acritarch	Resembles arcellinids	
Papillomembrana	P. compta	Acritarch	Formerly placed within Dasycladales	
Polygonium	Polygonium sp.	Acritarch		
Pustulisphaera	P. membranacea	Acritarch	Bears three wall layers, with the middle one bearing pimple-like processes	
Salome	S. hubeiensis	Cyanobacteria	A fossil identified as a "microburrow" was placed in this genus before being reidentified as an oblique section of a tubular fossil	
Sarcinophycus	S. radiatus, S. papilloformis	Eukaryota?	Only known from Doushantuo, consists of bundles of sarcinoid cell packets	Sarcinophycus sp from the Ancanping assemblage of the Doushantuo Formation
Schizofusa	S. zangwenlongii	Acritarch	Similar to Leiosphaeridia	
Sculpturimembrana	S. ancangpingensis	Acritarch	Only known from Doushantuo, a large spherical vesicle composed of sculptures surrounded by a thick outer membrane, which is multi-laminate and tuberclated in nature	Sculpturimembrana ancangpingensis from the Ancanping assemblage of the Doushantuo Formation
Sinosphaera	S. asteriformis, S. rupina	Acritarch	Bears small conical spines and a few larger ones	Sinosphaera asteriformis from the Ancanping assemblage of the Doushantuo Formation
Symphysosphaera	S. basimembrana	Acritarch	Similar to Eosphaera, but larger	
Tanarium	T. acus, T. conoideum, T. elegans, T. longitubulare, T. minimum, T. obesum, T. pilosiusculum, T. pycnacanthum, T. varium, T. gracilentum, T. paucispinosum, T. tuberosum (?)	Acritarch	Spine shapes vary from small and triangular to long and needle-like	
Tianzhushania	T. polysiphonina, T. spinosa	Acritarch	Bears a many-layered wall with spines penetrating through it	Tianzhushania polysiphonia from the Ancanping assemblage of the Doushantuo Formation
Urasphaera	U. fungiformis, U. nupta, U. triformis	Acritarch	Bears mushroom-shaped spines, hence the specific name fungiformis	
Variomargosphaeridium	V. floridum	Acritarch	Bears processes which branch at their tips	
Vulcanosphaera	V. phacelosa	Acritarch	Bears bundled hair-like processes	
Weissiella	W. brevis, W. grandistella	Acritarch	Doushantuo fossils resemble Russian specimens, but are smaller	Weissiella grandistella from the Ancanping assemblage of the Doushantuo Formation
Xenosphaera	X. liantuoensis	Acritarch	Bears extremely thin processes, which have a tendency to not preserve	
Yushengia	Y. ramispina	Acritarch	Resembles Weissiella, but has longer spines	

=== Miscellaneous taxa ===
Miscellaneous taxa
Genus	Species	Higher taxon	Notes	Images
Cucullus	C. fraudulentus	incertae sedis	Originally interpreted as a sponge, then reinterpreted as a microbialite	Line drawing of Cucullus fraudulentus
Paragraptobranca	P. curvus	incertae sedis	Shares features with both graptolites and macroalgae	
Calyptrina	C. striata	Annelida?	Almost certainly a metazoan	Calyptrina reconstruction
Eoandromeda	E. octobrachiata	Ctenophora?	Originally interpreted as the adult stage of various embryos, then as a pelagic discoid ctenophore, then an umbrella-shaped demersal form	Artist restoration of the "discoid ctenophore" hypothesis
Eocyathispongia	E. qiania	Porifera	Earliest likely sponge fossil	Reconstruction of Eocyathispongia
Linbotulitaenia	L. globosa	Metazoa	Likely a trace fossil of a wriggling mucus-covered animal, possibly from Wenghuiia	
Protoconites	P. minor	Cnidaria?	Likely a cnidarian-grade organism similar to Cambrorhytium	Fossil of the probable Ediacaran cnidarian Protoconites from the Ancanping assemblage of the Doushantuo Formation
Sinospongia	S. chenjunyuani, S. typica	Porifera?	May also be a vermiform alga like the Huainan biota	Line drawing of Sinospongia chenjunyuani
Triactindiscus	T. sinensis	Metazoa	A tri-radial fossil.	
Vernanimalcula	V. guizhouensis	Bilateria?	Originally interpreted as a bilaterian, then found to be more likely an indeterminate acritarch, then again found to be a likely bilaterian	
Wenghuiia	W. jiangkouensis	Annelida?	Putatively the earliest known annelid (and also the earliest known bilaterian), even though it already seems very derived	

== Palaeogeography ==
The formation was laid down on a carbonate shelf, whose rim enclosed a lagoon between tidal flats on the shore, and the deeper ocean. This lagoon was periodically anoxic or euxinic (containing hydrogen sulfide); variations in the chemistry in the lagoon can be detected in isotopic and elemental abundance cycles in the rock and possibly contributed to the fossil preservation.

== Geochemistry ==
The most recent Doushantuo rocks show a sharp decrease in the ^{13}C/^{12}C carbon isotope ratio. Since this change appears to be worldwide but its timing does not match that of any other known major event such as a mass extinction, it may represent "possible feedback relationships between evolutionary innovation and seawater chemistry" in which metazoans (multi-celled organisms) removed carbon from the water, which increased the concentration of oxygen, and the increased oxygen level made possible the evolution of new metazoans.

== See also ==
- Phosphatic fossilization
