= Vernanimalcula =

Vernanimalcula Temporal range: Ediacaran, 600–580 Ma
- The holotype of Vernanimalcula guizhouena

Scientific classification
- Domain: Eukaryota
- (unranked): †Acritarcha
- Genus: †Vernanimalcula; Chen et al., 2004
- Species: †V. guizhouena

Binomial name
- †Vernanimalcula guizhouena Chen et al., 2004

Fossil of possible very early bilateral animal

Vernanimalcula guizhouena is an acritarch dating from 600 to 580 million years ago; it was between 0.1 and 0.2 mm across (roughly the width of one or two human hairs). Vernanimalcula means "small spring animal", referring to its appearance in the fossil record at the end of the Marinoan Glaciation and the belief upon discovery it was an animal.

== Discovery ==
The Vernanimalcula fossils were discovered in the Doushantuo Formation in China. This formation is a Konservat-Lagerstätte, one of the rare places where soft body parts and very fine details are preserved in the fossil record.

== Anatomy ==
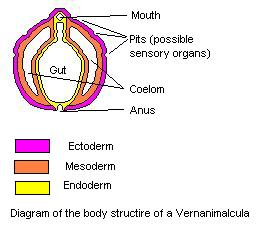
A depiction of Vernanimalcula as a bilaterian.

The Vernanimalcula fossils were interpreted as showing a triploblastic structure, a coelom, a differentiated gut, a mouth, an anus, and paired external pits that were believed possible sense organs, making it the earliest known member of the Bilateria (animals with bilateral symmetry, at least as embryos).

The appearance of Vernanimalcula so early in the fossil record was believed to have had important implications if it were really bilaterian. The radiation of animals into many phyla would have occurred before any animal became much larger than microscopic size, making the sudden appearance of many animal phyla in the Cambrian explosion an illusion and merely represented a (geologically) sudden increase in size and the development of easily fossilised body parts by species in existing phyla.

The description of Vernanimalcula as bilaterian has been strongly challenged. Other workers (Bengtson, Budd and co-workers) in the field have repeatedly claimed that Vernanimalcula is largely a taphonomic artefact generated by phosphate growth within a spherical object such as an acritarch, and thus Vernanimalcula was not even an animal, let alone a bilaterian. Chen et al. initially defended their interpretation of Vernanimalcula against the claims of Bengtson and Budd. Petryshyn et al. examined additional fossils resembling Vernanimalcula and concluded that the fossils are "likely biogenic in nature."

== See also ==
- Snowball Earth
- Spriggina
- Kimberella
