= Petrophyton (alga) =

Petrophyton Temporal range: Mid Ordovician

Scientific classification
- Clade: Archaeplastida
- Division: Rhodophyta
- Class: Florideophyceae
- Stem group: Corallinales
- Genus: Petrophyton; Yabe

Species
- Petrophyton kiaeri Hoeg; Petrophyton miyakoense Yabe

Synonyms
- Solenopora richmondense ?(see)

Genus of algae

Petrophyton is a genus of alga that falls in the coralline stem group.

== See also ==
- Coralline algae#Evolution
- Other stem-group corallines:
  - Arenigiphyllum (Ordovician)
  - Petrophyton (Ordovician : Caradoc)
  - Graticula (Silurian : Wenlock)
  - Halysis (Ordovician)
  - Archaeolithophyllum (Pennsylvanian)
  - ?Maimonachaetetes (Mississippian)
  - ?Palaeoaplysina (Pennsylvanian – Permian; possibly an animal)
  - ? Solenoporaceae (Ordovician)
