= Archaeolithophyllum =

Archaeolithophyllum Temporal range: Pennsylvanian

Scientific classification
- Clade: Archaeplastida
- Division: Rhodophyta
- Class: Florideophyceae
- Stem group: Corallinales
- Family: †Archaeolithophyllaceae
- Genus: †Archaeolithophyllum; Johnson, 1956

Species
- A. delicatium Johnson, 1956; A. missouriensum Johnson, 1956 (type)

Extinct genus of algae

Archaeolithophyllum is a genus of conceptacle-bearing red alga that falls in the coralline stem group. It somewhat resembles Lithophyllum.

As of today, Archaeolithophyllum is the only Palaeozoic coralline to bear clear conceptacles, although the earlier Graticula does bear reproductive structures.

It mineralized using aragonite. Its conceptacles are cone-shaped protrusions that extend outwards from the thallus surface and have a single central opening. It probably encrusted muddy or sandy surfaces.

== See also ==
- Coralline algae#Evolution
- Other stem-group corallines:
  - Arenigiphyllum (Ordovician)
  - Petrophyton (Ordovician : Caradoc)
  - Graticula (Silurian : Wenlock)
  - Halysis (Ordovician)
  - Archaeolithophyllum (Pennsylvanian)
  - ?Maimonachaetetes (Mississippian)
  - ?Palaeoaplysina (Pennsylvanian – Permian; possibly an animal)
  - ? Solenoporaceae (Ordovician)
