= Eocyathispongia =

Eocyathispongia Temporal range: 602 Ma

Scientific classification
- Kingdom: Animalia
- Phylum: Porifera (?)
- Genus: †Eocyathispongia; Yin et al. 2015
- Species: †E. qiania

Binomial name
- †Eocyathispongia qiania Yin et al. 2015

Extinct genus of sponge-like animals

Eocyathispongia is a genus of sponge-like organisms which lived in the Ediacaran period about 60 million years before the Cambrian. The current fossil record has found this genus in only one location, the Doushantuo Formation in Guizhou, China. It lived in the shallow parts of seas, filter feeding.

== Description ==
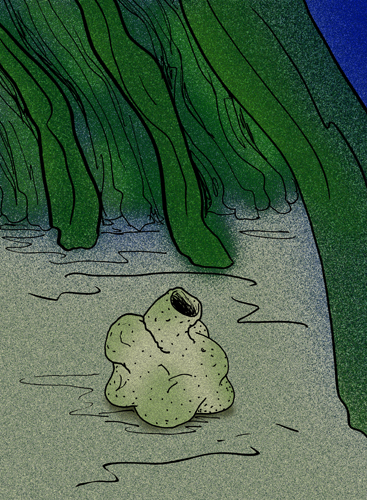
Artist restoration

As of yet, only one fossil of the genus has been found, but it was excellently preserved. The specific attributes for this genus have yet to be confirmed until more specimens are found.

=== Eocyathispongia qiania ===
Eocyathispongia qiania is the only species in the Eocyathispongia genus. It was an epifaunal filter feeder that consisted of three tubes, with two smaller side tubes that were likely used to filter water in, and a large, twisted centre tube which was likely used to filter the water out. The cells inside the tubes are flat and porous, as would be expected in a filter feeder. The cells located on the bottom of the fossil are less porous and were likely used to keep the animal grounded, and the cells on the outside of the tube differ from those on the inside. The creature is asymmetrical. The fossil found was only about 1.1 millimeters tall and 1.2 millimeters wide, so it can be assumed that the species as a whole would be about the same size since there's no evidence indicating that the fossil found was not a fully grown specimen.

=== Doushantuo Formation ===
This is the location where the specimen was discovered. This formation consists of the shallow waters of the Ediacaran and the rocks are made up of six layers of phosphorite and dolomite. The fossil was found in a phosphorite rock near the lower layer of the rock formation. The specimen was fossilized through lithification.

== Etymology ==
The name of the genus combines the Greek root eo- meaning dawn, and the Greek word for cup-shaped, cyathifer, to describe what the creature looks like. The word spongia was added to indicate that the genus is assessed as a sponge.

== Relationship and significance ==
The specimen found is surprisingly similar to sponges alive today. The cellular structure is almost identical to some modern-day sponges, and the less porous basal side is also more consistent with modern sponges alive today. However, because its combination of traits does not resemble any one of the four extant classes of Porifera, Yin et al. (2015) assign it to the stem group relative to all living sponges.

This genus, if it is indeed a sponge, is significant mostly for the time period it was alive in. Until the discovery of this creature, the existence of sponges in the Ediacaran was only theoretical. The specimen found is nevertheless a problem for theories of early sponge evolution, because all members of the sponge crown group have a specific type of cell in their inner wall called choanocytes, which are believed to be inherited from the choanoflagellate ancestor of all animals. So it was expected they would be found in "even stem group sponges", but there's no significant evidence to show that the specimen had any of these cells.

Cavalier-Smith (2017) challenges the assignment of Eocyathispongia to the Porifera since, unlike sponges, it "lacks evidence for an [aquiferous system], the tiny putative intercellular spaces being insufficient evidence for ostia and [internal water] channels penetrating the body wall". Instead he interprets the animal as a "presponge" and groups it with the enigmatic fossil Funisia into the Varisarca, a new 'non-quilted' subphylum proposed by him within the Vendozoa which he regards as the oldest animal phylum (contrasting with the 'quilted' subphylum Petalonamae). If this is correct, Eocyathispongia is not phylogenetically a member of the sponge line but represents an evolutionary grade out of which ancestral sponges arose.

== See also ==
- List of Ediacaran genera
