= Principia =

Principia may refer to:

- Philosophiæ Naturalis Principia Mathematica, Isaac Newton's three-volume work about his laws of motion and universal gravitation
- Principia (lit. "primary buildings"), the headquarters at the center of Roman forts (Latin: castra)
- The Principia, an educational institution for Christian Scientists in the St. Louis, Missouri, area
  - Principia College, a private four-year college in Elsah, Illinois
  - Principia School, a school from early childhood to high school in the St. Louis, Missouri, area
- Principia (alga), a stem-group coralline alga
- Principia, the former name of Zope, the "Z Object Publishing Environment"
- 2653 Principia, an asteroid named after Newton's work
- The Principia (book), by Emanuel Swedenborg
- Principia Mathematica, a three-volume work on the foundations of mathematics by Bertrand Russell and Alfred North Whitehead
- Principia Ethica, a book on ethics by G. E. Moore
- Principia Discordia, a Discordian religious text by Greg Hill (Malaclypse the Younger) and Kerry Wendell Thornley (Lord Omar Khayyam Ravenhurst)
- Principia, astronaut Tim Peake's mission as part of the Expedition 46 crew of the International Space Station
- "Principia" (Agents of S.H.I.E.L.D.), season 5 episode 13 of Marvel's Agents of S.H.I.E.L.D.
