= Miaohephyton =

Miaohephyton Temporal range: Ediacaran ~551 Ma
- Line drawing reconstruction of the holotype specimens of Miaohephyton bifurcatum

Scientific classification
- Domain: Eukaryota
- Supergroup: Stramenopiles
- Division: Ochrophyta
- Class: Phaeophyceae (?)
- Genus: †Miaohephyton; Chen, 1991 emend. Steiner, 1994
- Species: †M. bifurcatum

Binomial name
- †Miaohephyton bifurcatum Chen, 1991 emend. Steiner, 1994

Synonyms
- Gracilogia Ding, 1992; G. sphaericusa; G. rugosa; G. dicrana

Species of extinct alga

Miaohephyton is an extinct carbonaceous fossil from the late Ediacaran of China. It has been considered as a brown alga, although others suggest this may simply be convergent. It is a monotypic genus, containing only Miaohephyton bifurcatum.

== Discovery and naming ==
The first fossils of Miaohephyton were found in the upper Miaohe shales of the Doushantuo Formation, in Hubei, South China in 1991, although the genus was not validated until 1994.

The generic name Miaohephyton derives from the type locality of "Miaohe", in honour of the Chinese scientists that studied and described the first Neoproterozoic macro-algae.

== Description ==
Miaohephyton bifurcatum is a small, branching macro-alga, with the largest fragmented specimen getting up to 10 mm (0.4 in) in length, with branches ranging between 0.1–0.5 mm (0.00–0.02 in) in width. The main body, or thallus, features dichotomous branching, and sometimes also has constrictions along its length, which sometimes caused breakages during burial, and the outer cell layer of the thallus was relatively thick, possibly inferring that it was slightly mineralised in life. The branches themselves are notably smooth, and may have originally been cylindrical in shape. It is also noted that renewal shoots are slightly pointed, and the distal tips of older shoots are either rounded, forked or truncated. There are also no more than three main branches in any given branched specimen. There have also been found on the branches of some specimens small, compressed circular structures, interpreted as conceptacles, that are typically 0.2 mm (0.01 in) in diameter, and have a dense distribution.

== Affinities ==
When validated in 1994, Miaohephyton was originally considered to be a rhodophytan, a group that contains the red algae, with strong similarities to the extant red algae genus Galaxaura. A paper published in 1998 instead suggested a closer affinity with Phaeophyceae, the class that contains brown algae, and further describing them as possibly being placed within the Fucales order, again due to its general morphology.

However, a study take in 2010 noted that the Phaeophyceae affnities where highly unlikely, as it does not line up with the estimated divergence of true brown algae by some 300 million years ago, instead putting forward the interpretation that the features seen in Miaohephyton are simply the result of convergent evolution of brown algae features in red and green algae, or an early photosynthetic Stramenopile that left no descendants.
