= Aseelahella =

Aseelahella Temporal range: Permian

Scientific classification
- Clade: Archaeplastida
- Division: Rhodophyta
- Class: Florideophyceae
- Stem group: Corallinales
- Family: †Archaeolithophyllaceae
- Genus: †Aseelahella

Extinct genus of algae

Aseelahella is a fossil genus of branching alga that falls within the coralline stem group.
