= Gremiphyca =

Gremiphyca Temporal range: Ediacaran ~635–551 Ma

Scientific classification
- Domain: Eukaryota
- Clade: Archaeplastida
- Division: Rhodophyta
- Genus: †Gremiphyca; Zhang et al., 1998
- Species: †G. corymbiata

Binomial name
- †Gremiphyca corymbiata Zhang et al., 1998

Extinct genus of algal fossils

Gremiphyca is a lobed, non-mineralised alga from the Ediacaran period of China. It is a monotypic genus, containing only Gremiphyca corymbiata.

== Discovery and naming ==
Fossil material of Gremiphyca was found in the middle of the Doushantuo Formation, Guizhou Province of South China and formally described in 1998.

The generic name Gremiphyca derives from the Latin word gremialis, to mean "to grow in a cluster", in reference to the clustered thalli of the fossil material. The specific name corymbiata derives directly from the Latin word corymbiata, to mean "clustered", in reference to the clustering of the thallus lobes.

== Description ==
Gremiphyca corymbiata is a lobed alga with domed, pseudoparenchymatous thalli attaining sizes up to 130–150 μm (0.0051–0.0059 in) in length and 200–260 μm (0.0079–0.0102 in) in width. The thalli themselves are noted to be clustered together, and in some cases larger thalli overlap smaller thalli. Alongside this, the thalli are also separated into three smaller units via membrane walls, and are composed of small rectangular cells between 8–10 μm (0.00031–0.00039 in) in length. It is also noted that there is no differentiation between the cortical and medullary tissues.

A later study would see Gremiphyca placed as a benthic alga, primarily due to the large sizes of its thalli.

== Affinities ==
When originally described in 1998, it was noted that the morphology of Gremiphyca is similar to certain members of the Rhodophyta, such as Corallina, although it was not placed into any group within Rhodophyta due to the simplicity of the fossil material. In 2004, the affinities of Gremiphyca would be looked into again, going on to note that a similar genus, Wengania, may in fact be early developmental stages of Gremiphyca, as well as another alga genus Thallophycoides. This study would then go on to interpret Gremiphyca and the aforementioned genera as a stem-group florideophyte due to their closely clustered thalli.
