= Doushantuo type preservation =

Method of fossil formation

In paleontology, Doushantuo preservation is a type of fossilization unique to the Doushantuo formation. It involves very early phosphatisation on a cellular level - with cells being replaced by phosphate before they degrade.

== Occurrence ==
The mode of preservation is typically found in shallow, high energy waters, as lenses of phosphate in carbonate rocks. Its occurrence is assisted by high concentrations of phosphate, which are presumably led to precipitate around the degradation products of cells and cell walls.

== What is preserved ==
Cells are preserved at a cellular level, with arguments that sub-cellular structures may even represent cell nuclei.

== Bias ==
Although the preservational window is open pretty continually from about 580 million years ago through most of the Cambrian, it tends to preserve microscopic things, such as embryos and bacteria.
