= Hortonella =

Hortonella Temporal range: Early Carboniferous

Scientific classification
- Clade: Archaeplastida
- Division: Rhodophyta
- Class: Florideophyceae
- Stem group: Corallinales
- Family: †Archaeolithophyllaceae
- Genus: †Hortonella

Extinct genus of algae

Hortonella is a fossil genus of alga that has been placed deep in the coralline stem group on the basis of its scarcely differentiated thallus.
