= Phosphatization =

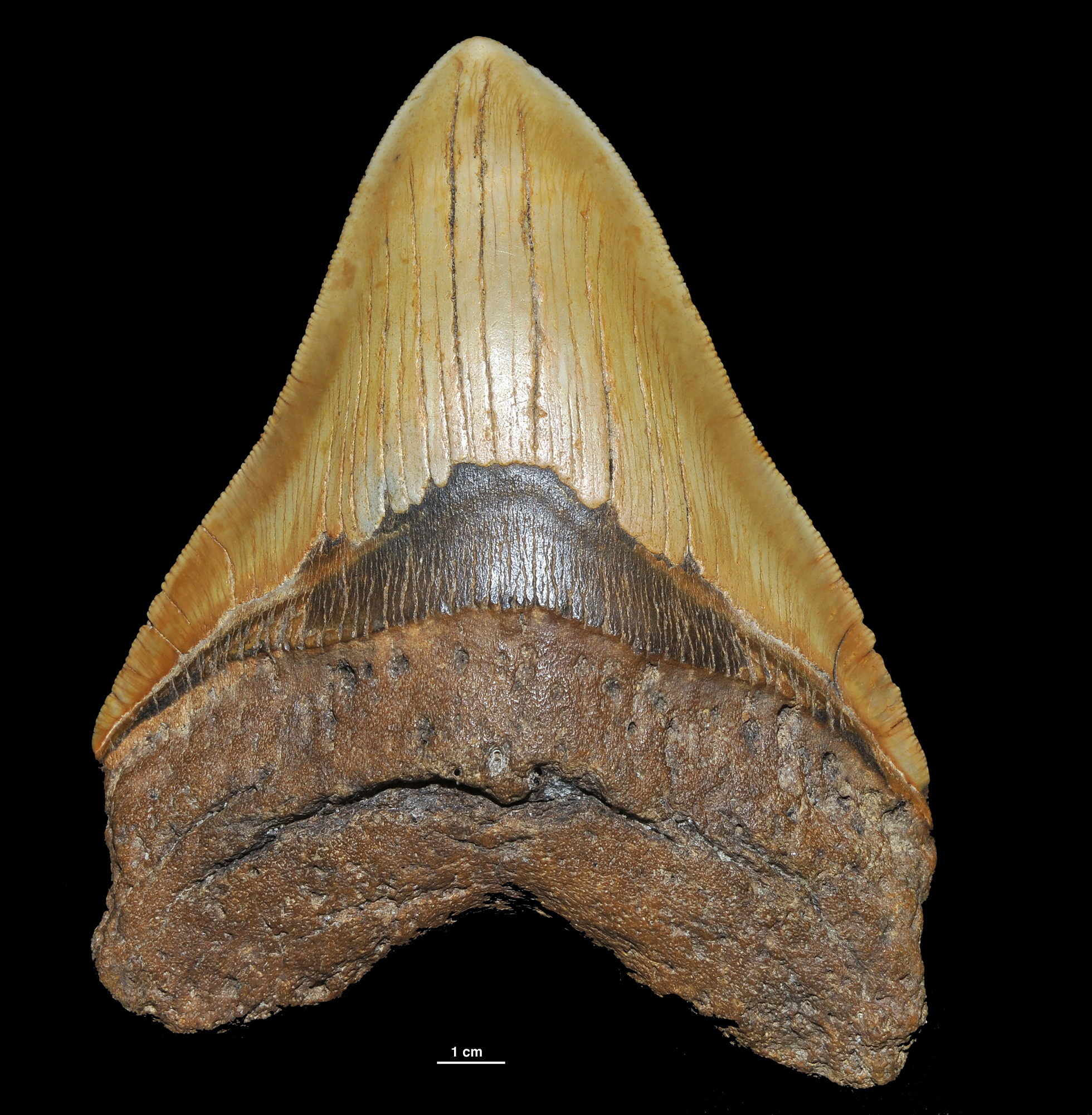
Phosphatized Otodus megalodon tooth from the Bahía Inglesa Formation

Phosphatization, or phosphatic fossilization, refers to the process of fossilization where organic matter is replaced by abundant calcium-phosphate minerals. It has occurred in unusual circumstances to preserve some extremely high-resolution microfossils in which careful preparation can even reveal preserved cellular structures. Such microscopic fossils are only visible under the scanning electron microscope.

== Mechanism ==
Large quantities of phosphate are required, either from seawater or from the tissues of the decaying organism. In some cases microbes control the phosphatization, and the remains of the microbes that feed on the preserved tissue form the fossil. In others, the tissue itself is the source of phosphate and its phosphatized remains form the fossil. In the intermediate case the phosphatized tissue retains the impressions of the phosphatizing microbes.

== Phosphatic preservation in Burgess Shale-type fossils ==
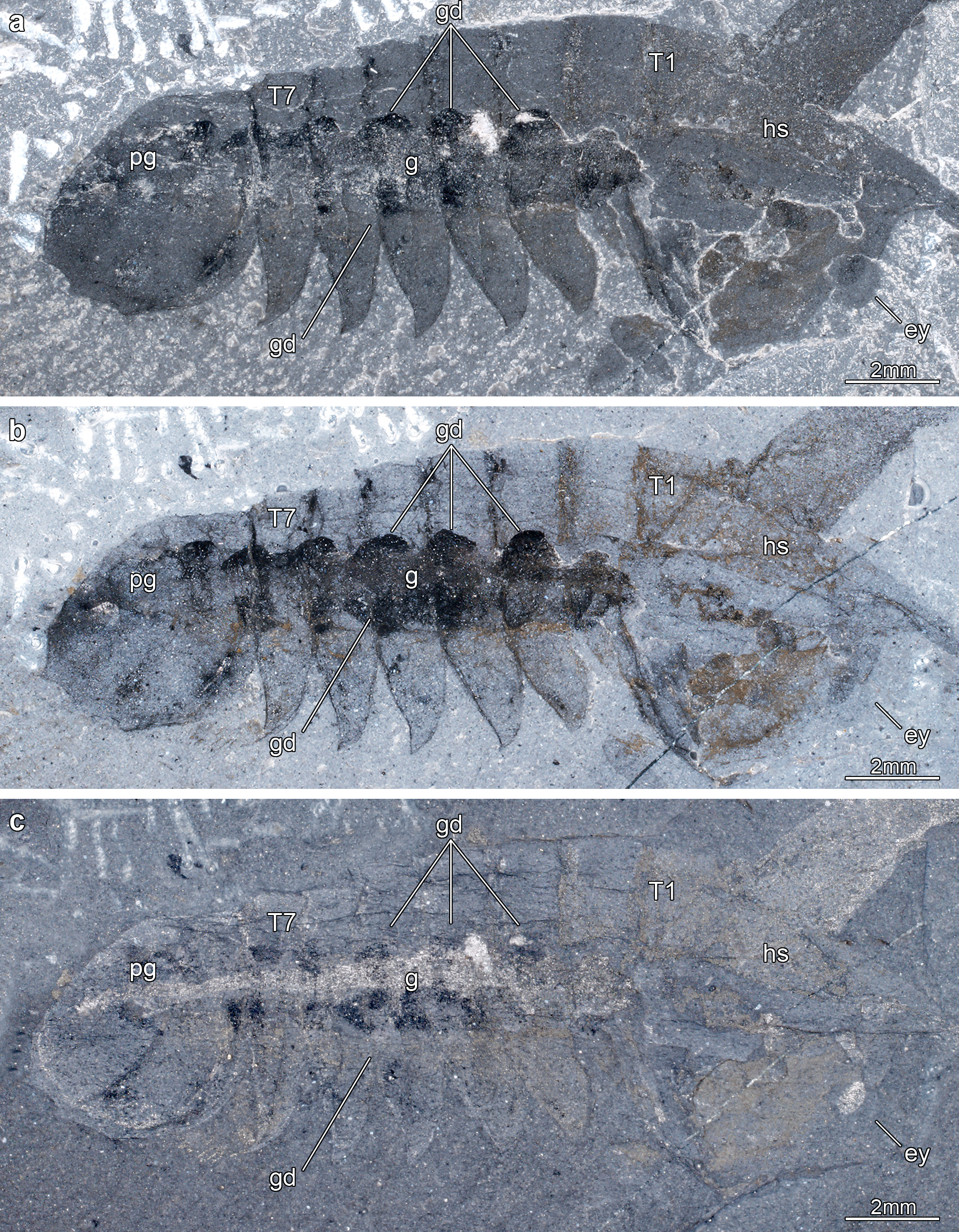
Phosphatized gut diverticula of Mollisonia from the Burgess Shale

Soft-tissue fossils, such as those found in the Burgess Shale, are rare. In some cases their internal organs are replicated in phosphate. The phosphate mainly comes from the tissue itself, and may later be replaced by calcium carbonate. A low pH makes CaCO_{3} less likely to precipitate, clearing the way for phosphate to be laid down. This is facilitated by the absence of oxygen in the decaying tissue. Accordingly, (secondary) phosphate is generally only preserved in enclosed spaces, such as a tightly-closed bivalve shell.

Higher concentrations of phosphate in the sea water do not enhance phosphatization, as may seem natural; rather, it increases the rate at which the organism breaks up, perhaps because the mineral "fertilizes" the decay micro-organisms.

Phosphatization can happen quickly: The chitinous structures that support bivalve gills can be replaced by calcium phosphate, with a little help from co-occurring bacteria, in just two to six days. The gill axes and musculature of bivalves can also be preserved in phosphate. The structures that are most famously preserved in phosphate in the Burgess Shale are the midgut glands of Leanchoilia, perhaps on account of their central position and plausibly a low pH.

Phosphatization can be microbially mediated, especially in decay-resistant groups such as arthropods; or substrate-dominated, where phosphate-rich tissue leads the mineralization process (as in fish). Cephalopods fall somewhere between these two extremes.

== Phosphate-only fossils ==
In phosphatic fossils, the preservation is so fine that even some cellular structure has been preserved. The phosphatic microfossils of the Doushantuo Formation, a fossil-rich lagerstätte of the Ediacaran period, about 590–565 Ma (megaannua; million years ago), display some of the most spectacular cellular-level preservation known from the geologic record. The fossils include what may be metazoan blastulas, possibly animal embryos at an early stage in cell division.

The Doushantuo Formation presents a classic example of phosphatic fossilization:

'This high-resolution fossil bed is about 30% phosphate, present as the mineral fluorapatite [Ca_{5}(PO_{4})_{3}F]. Phosphatic beds within this deposit are grainstones composed of 1- to 5-mm phosphoclasts. These derive from a phosphatic surface that formed on the sea floor, in the process of recrystallizing existing surface sediments. In addition to replacing carbonate sediments, soft tissues of metazoan embryos, larvae, adults, and algae also appear to have been mineralized. The phosphatized sediment crust was then broken into small fragments by heavy current activity and then redeposited and mixed in with adjacent lime muds. Careful acid baths etch away the limestone matrices, by slowly dissolving the carbonates, and reveal the phosphates that have replaced organic structures, in the manner that Dr. Chen describes. There are other means of fossilization represented in the Doushantuo Formation as well.

A refinement to viewing the internal structure of fossilized embryos uses specialized microscopic three-dimensional X-ray computed tomography, a kind of micro CAT scan.

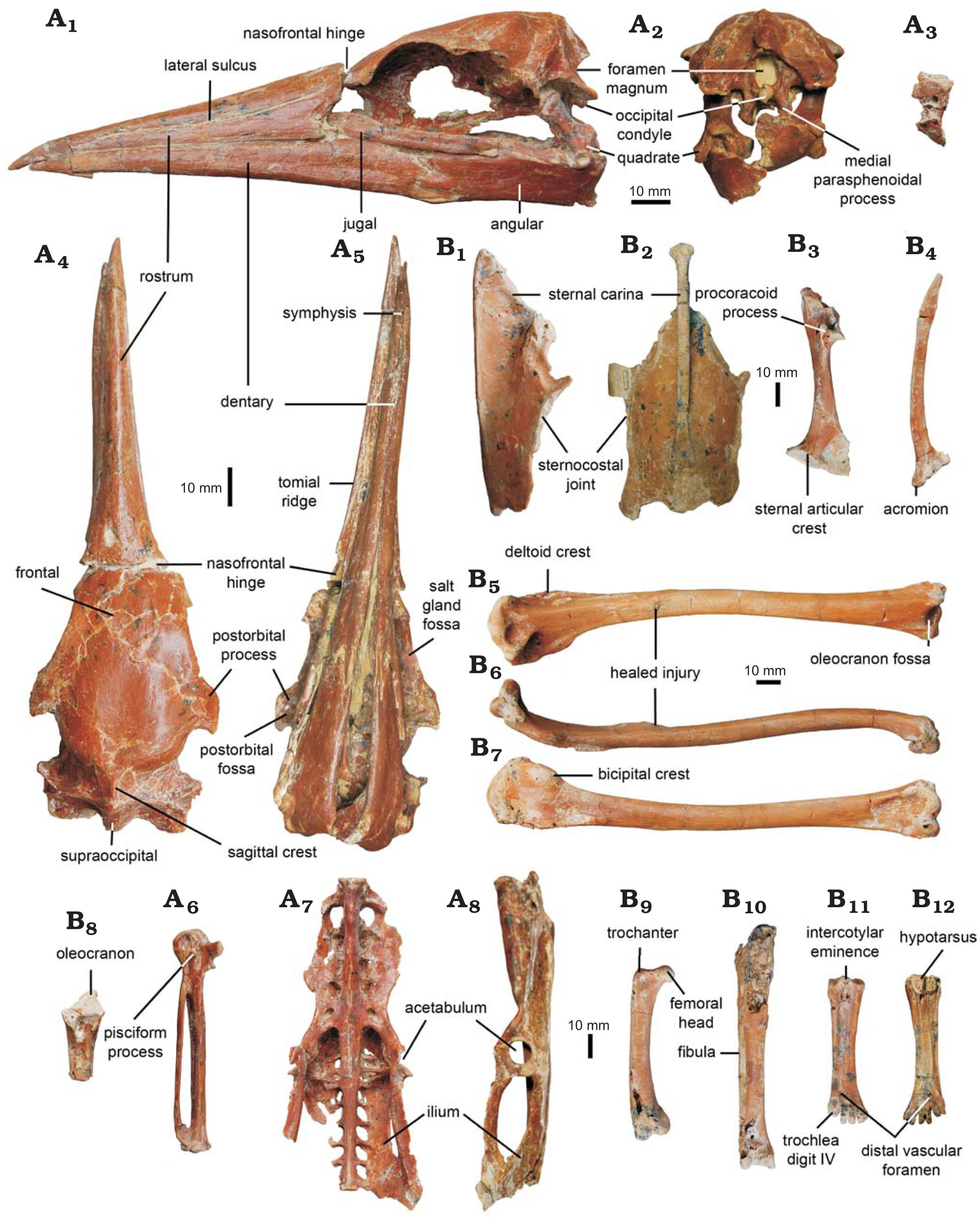

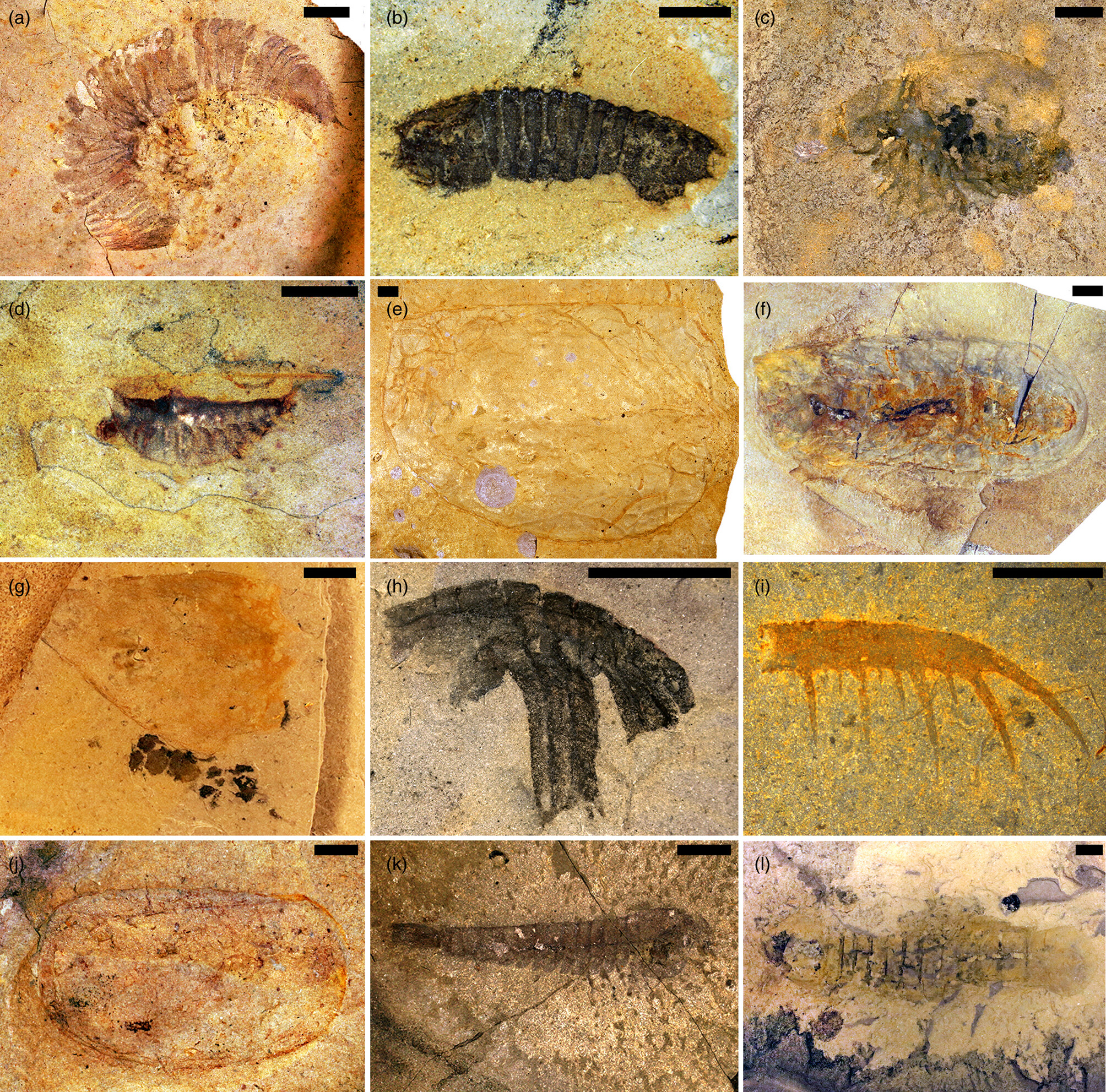

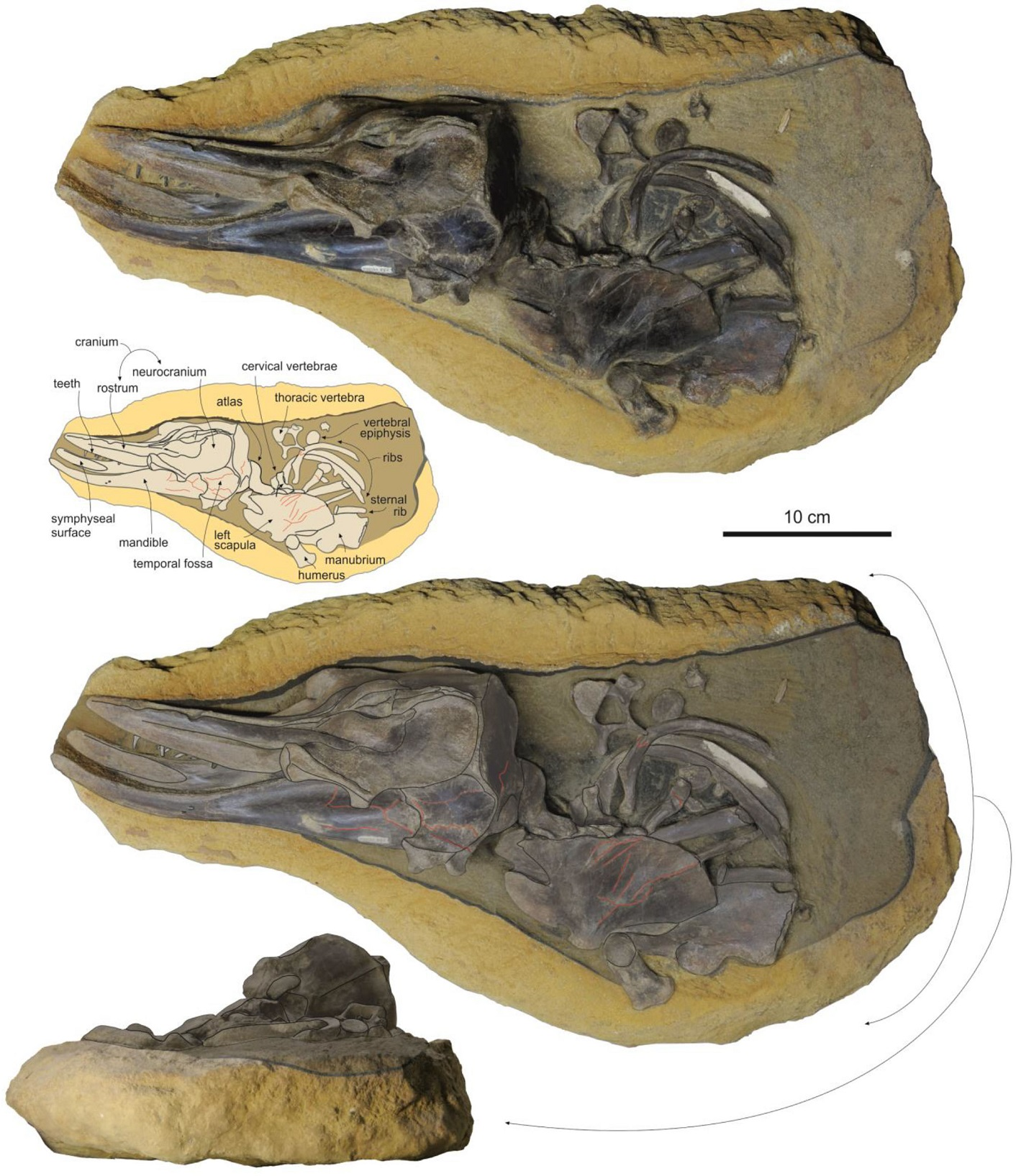

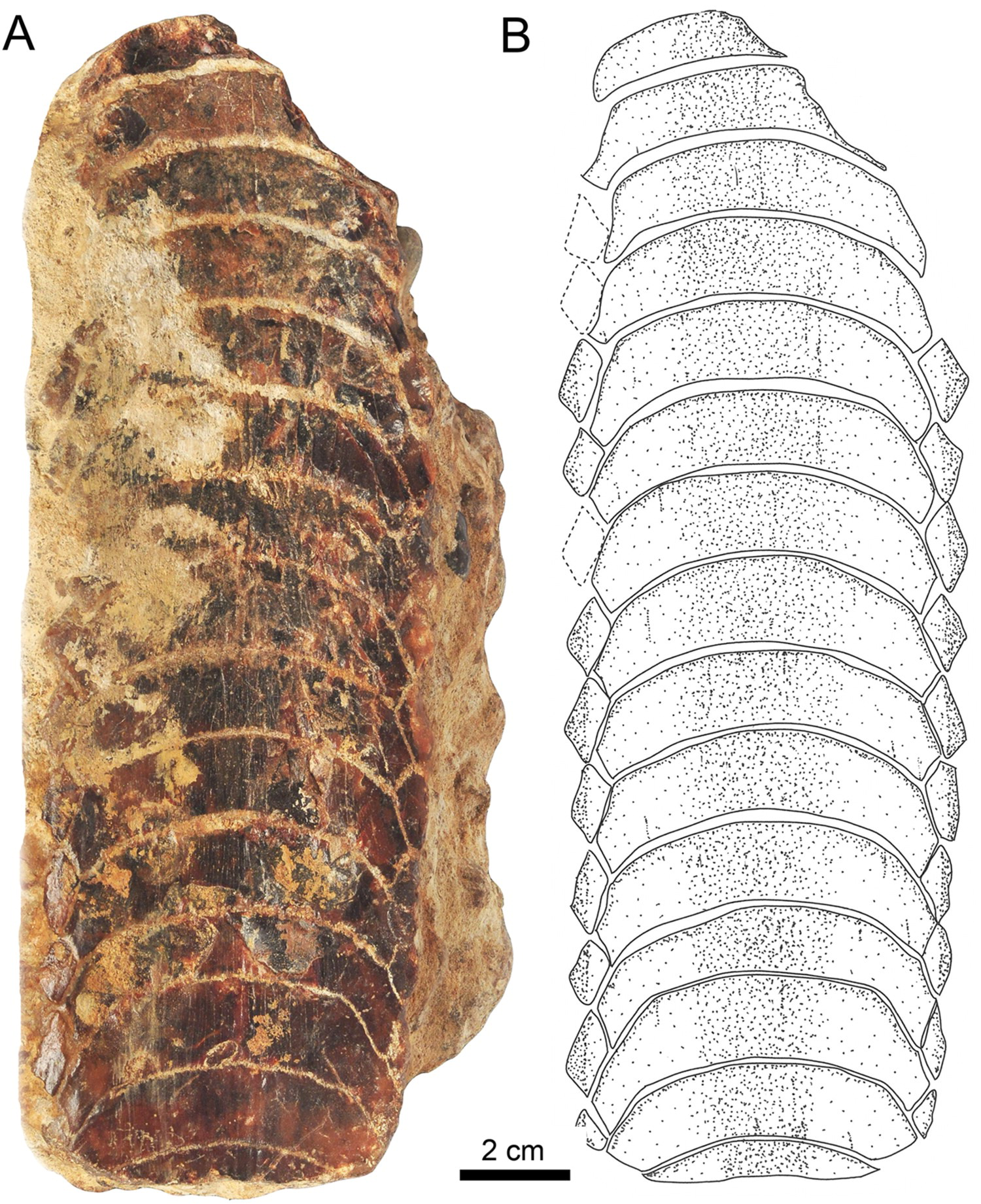
