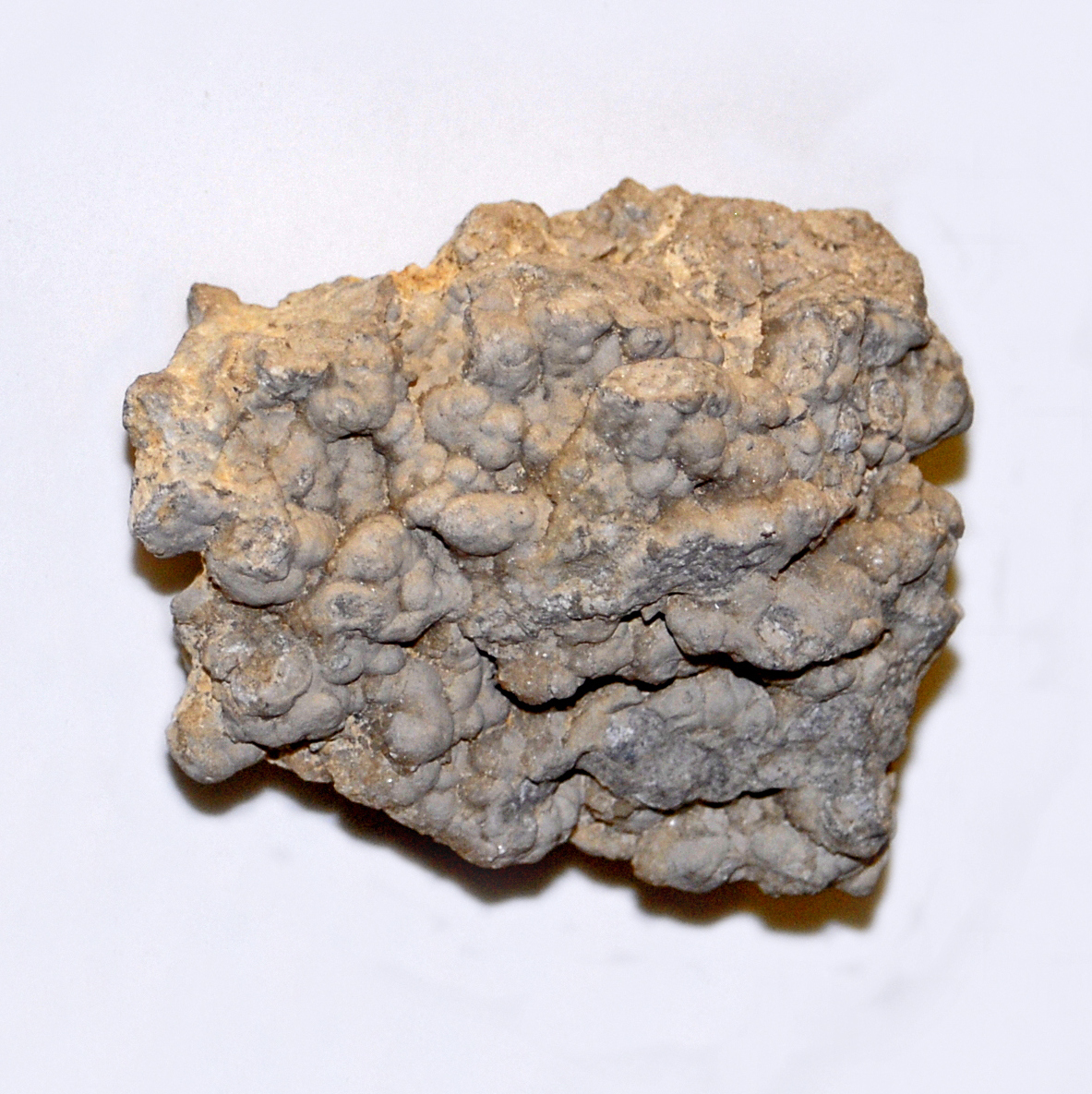
- Fossils of Solenopora species

Scientific classification
- Clade: Archaeplastida
- Division: Rhodophyta
- Class: Florideophyceae
- Stem group: Corallinales
- Family: †Solenoporaceae; Pia, 1927
- Genus: †Solenopora; Dybowski, 1877

Species
- †Solenopora alcicornis Ott, 1966; †Solenopora concentrica Senowbari-Daryan et al., 2006; †Solenopora guangxiensis Wu, 1991; †Solenopora jurassica Brown, 1894; †Solenopora paraconcentrica Senowbari-Daryan et al., 2006; †Solenopora rectangulata Senowbari-Daryan et al., 2008; †Solenopora spongiodes Dybowski, 1877; †Solenopora triasina Vinassa de Regny, 1915; †Solenopora vachardi Senowbari-Daryan et al., 2006

= Solenopora =

Solenopora Temporal range: Cambrian–Tertiary

Extinct genus of algae

The extinct Solenoporaceae have traditionally been interpreted as a group of red algae ancestral to the Corallinales.

The genus from which they take their name, Solenopora, originates in the Ordovician. Unlike the Corallinaceae, this family has large vegetative cells and an undifferentiated thallus. Additionally there are external, non-calcified sporangia.

The differences in structure suggest that the holotype is not an alga at all, but rather is a chaetetid sponge. Post-Palaeozoic specimens therefore require re-classification. However, some algal taxa are still classified within the genus.

Some specimens of algal Solenopora retain an original pink colouration, which is banded with growth stages of the fossil; this is produced by boron-containing hydrocarbons.

The solenoporaceae mineralized with calcite.

== Other genera within the Solenoporaceae ==
Although the following other genera have been included in this family, their status is uncertain due to the loose definition of the family.

- Dendronella Moussavian and Senowbari-Daryan 1988
- Elianella
- Marinella Pfender 1939
- Metasolenopora Pia 1930
- Parachaetetes Deninger 1906
- Pycnoporidium Yabe and Toyama 1928
- Solenoporella Rothpletz
- Tauristorea Senowbari-Daryan and Link 2005

== See also ==
- Coralline algae#Evolution
- Other stem-group corallines:
  - Arenigiphyllum (Ordovician)
  - Petrophyton (Ordovician : Caradoc)
  - Graticula (Silurian : Wenlock)
  - Halysis (Ordovician)
  - Archaeolithophyllum (Pennsylvanian)
  - ?Maimonachaetetes (Mississippian)
  - ?Palaeoaplysina (Pennsylvanian – Permian; possibly an animal)
  - ? Solenoporaceae (Ordovician)
