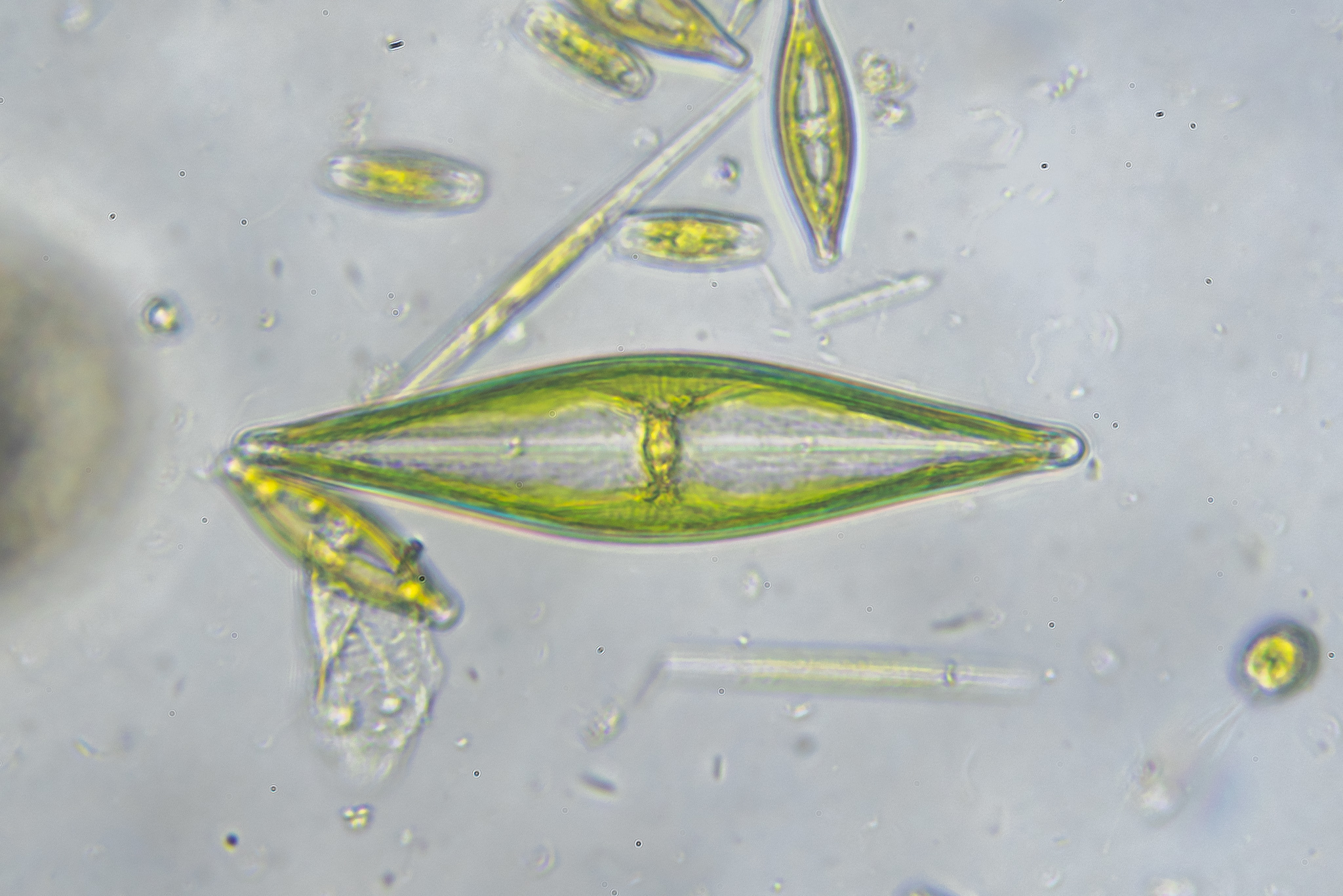
- Craticula sp.

Scientific classification
- Domain: Eukaryota
- Clade: Sar
- Clade: Stramenopiles
- Phylum: Ochrophyta
- Clade: Diatomeae
- Class: Bacillariophyceae
- Order: Naviculales
- Family: Stauroneidaceae
- Genus: Craticula; Grunow, 1867

Type species
- Craticula perrotettii Grunow

Species
- See text

= Craticula =

Genus of single-celled organisms

Craticula is a genus of diatom that lies on or in the top layers of sediments in the freshwater to brackish water environments it inhabits. In addition to frustule morphology the genus differs from closely related species by its sexual reproduction and movement in response to light.

== Species ==
According to Algaebase, there are 62 species names and 12 intraspecific names:

- Craticula accomoda (Hustedt) D.G.Mann
- Craticula accomodiformis Lange-Bertalot
- Craticula acidoclinata Lange-Bertalot & Metzeltin
- Craticula ambigua (Ehrenberg) D.G.Mann
- Craticula angustilancea H.Lange-Bertalot, P.Cavacini, N.Tagliaventi & S.Alfinito
- Craticula antarctica B.Van de Vijver & K.Sabbe
- Craticula australis Van der Vijver, Kopalová & Zindarova
- Craticula buderi (Hustedt) Lange-Bertalot
- Craticula citroides H.Lange-Bertalot, P.Cavacini, N.Tagliaventi & S.Alfinito
- Craticula citrus (Krasske) Reichardt
- Craticula coloradensis Edlund, D.R.L.Burge & S.A.Spaulding
- Craticula cuspidata (Kutzing) D.G.Mann
  - Craticula cuspidata f. tenuirostris A.Cleve-Euler: Invalid
  - Craticula cuspidata var. craticula Aysel: Synonym of Craticula cuspidata (Kutzing) D.G.Mann
  - Craticula cuspidata var. heribaudii (Peragallo) E.Y.Haworth & M.G.Kelly: Synonym of Navicula cuspidata f. heribaudii (Peragallo) A.Cleve
  - Craticula cuspidata var. gracilis (M.Peragallo) Seeligmann, Maidana & Morales
  - Craticula cuspidata var. major (Meister) D.B.Czarnecki
  - Craticula cuspidata var. media (Meister) M.Aboal
- Craticula dissociata (E.Reichardt) E.Reichardt
- Craticula ehrenbergii Grunow
- Craticula elkab (Otto Müller) Lange-Bertalot, Kusber & Cocquyt
- Craticula frenguellii Metzeltin, Lange-Bertalot & García-Rodríguez
- Craticula fumantii H.Lange-Bertalot, P.Cavacini, N.Tagliaventi & S.Alfinito
- Craticula germainii H.Lange-Bertalot, P.Cavacini, N.Tagliaventi & S.Alfinito
- Craticula glaberrima (W.West & G.S.West) B.van de Vijver, K.Kopalová, R.Zidarova & E.J.Cox
- Craticula guatemalensis (Cleve & E.Grove) Lange-Bertalot
- Craticula guaykuruorum C.E.Wetzel, E.A.Morales & L.Ector
- Craticula halopannonica Lange-Bertalot
- Craticula halophila (Grunow) D.G.Mann
  - Craticula halophila f. robusta (Hustedt) Czarnecki: Synonym of Craticula halophila (Grunow) D.G.Mann
  - Craticula halophila f. tenuirostris (Hustedt) Czarnecki
  - Craticula halophila var. subcapitata (Østrup) D.B.Czarnecki
- Craticula halophilioides (Hustedt) Lange-Bertalot
- Craticula hungarica Pantocsek
- Craticula importuna (Hustedt) K.Bruder & Hinz
- Craticula johnstoniae L.Bahls
- Craticula lanceola H.Lange-Bertalot, P.Cavacini, N.Tagliaventi & S.Alfinito
- Craticula lange-bertalotii E.Reichardt
- Craticula lowei Kociolek
- Craticula megacuspidata (Carlson) Van de Vijver, Kopalová & Zidarova
- Craticula megaloptera (Ehrenberg) Grunow
- Craticula minusculoides (Hustedt) Lange-Bertalot
- Craticula molesta (Krasske) Lange-Bertalot & Willmann: Synonym of Craticula zizix (VanLandingham) Guiry
- Craticula molestiformis (Hustedt) Mayama
- Craticula neglecta H.Lange-Bertalot, P.Cavacini, N.Tagliaventi & S.Alfinito
- Craticula nonambigua H.Lange-Bertalot; P.Cavacini, N.Tagliaventi & S.Alfinito
- Craticula obaesa Van der Vijver, Kopalová & Zindarova
- Craticula orientalis Metzeltin, Lange-Bertalot & Nergui
- Craticula pampeana (Frenguelli) Lange-Bertalot
- Craticula paramolesta H.Lange-Bertalot, P.Cavacini, N.Tagliaventi & S.Alfinito
- Craticula perrotettii Grunow
  - Craticula perrotettii var. enervis (Hustedt) B.Hartley: Synonym of Craticula perrotettii Grunow
- Craticula petradeblockiana Van der Vijver, Kopalová & Zindarova
- Craticula procera (Ehrenberg) Grunow
- Craticula regigeorgiensis Zindarova, Kopálova & Van der Vijver
- Craticula riparia (Hustedt) Lange-Bertalot
  - Craticula riparia var. mollenhaueri Lange-Bertalot
- Craticula salsuginosa van de Vijver & Beyens
- Craticula sardiniana L.Bahls
- Craticula sardiniensis (Lange-Bertalot, Cavacini, Tagliaventi & Alfinito) E.Morales & M.Le
- Craticula silviae Lange-Bertalot
- Craticula strelnikoviana E.A.Morales, S.F.Rivera & C.E.Wetzel
- Craticula subhalophila (Hustedt) Lange-Bertalot
- Craticula subminuscula (Manguin) Wetzel & Ector
- Craticula submolesta (Hustedt) Lange-Bertalot
- Craticula subpampeana B.Van de Vijver & M.Sterken
- Craticula sverirschopkae Lange-Bertalot
- Craticula vixnegligenda Lange-Bertalot
- Craticula vixvisibilis (Hustedt) Lange-Bertalot
  - Craticula vixvisibilis var. distinctior Lange-Bertalot
- Craticula zizix (VanLandingham) Guiry
- Craticula zizix var. subdiversa (Messikommer) Guiry
