= Thallophyca =

Thallophyca Temporal range: Ediacaran ~570 Ma
- Line drawing reconstruction of Thallophyca ramosa

Scientific classification
- Domain: Eukaryota
- Supergroup: Archaeplastida
- Division: Rhodophyta
- Class: Florideophyceae
- Order: Corallinales
- Stem group: Corallinaceae
- Genus: †Thallophyca; Zhang, 1989

Type species
- †Thallophyca ramosa Zhang, 1989

Species
- †T. ramosa Zhang, 1989; †T. phylloformis Zhang & Yuan, 1992; †T. corrugata Zhang & Yuan, 1992

Synonyms
- T. ramosa; †T. simplicia Zhang, 1989

Extinct genus of algae

Thallophyca is a non-mineralized branching alga from the Ediacaran period of China. Three distinct species are known, T. ramosa, T. corrugata, and T. phylloformis. Thallophyca is a part of the phosphorite fossils of the wider Weng'an Biota.

== Discovery ==
Fossil material of Thallophyca was found in the Doushantuo Formation, Guizhou Province of South China and formally described in 1989.

== Etymology ==
The generic name Thallophyca derives from a truncated Greek word Thallus, commonly used for algae; and phyc, to mean "seaweed".

The specific name of T. ramosa derives directly from the Latin word of the same spelling, ramosa, to mean "branched", in reference to the appearance of its branching thallus. The specific name of T. corrugata derives directly from the Latin words of the same spelling, corrugata, to mean "wrinkly", in reference to the wrinkly appearance of the thallus. And the specific name of T. phylloformis derives from the Greek word phyllo, to mean "leaf"; and the Latin suffix word -formis, to mean "shape", in reference to the leaf-like shape of its thallus.

== Description ==
Schematic drawing of a cross section of Thallophyca ramosa

Thallophyca are ellipsoidal alga growing up to 3.5 mm (0.14 in) in height and 20 mm (0.8 in) in width, with the outer portions of their thallus being enlarged, with notable differentiation into an outer cortex and an inner medulla. The outer cells of the cortex are slightly elongated and spheroidal to polyhedral in shape, and oriented along the thallus, meanwhile the inner cells of the medulla diverge outwards in rows. These inners cells are similar to pseudoparenchyma, due to their tightly packed nature. Some specimens of Thallophyca also show possible reproductive cells within the thallus in the form of clustered islands of larger cells which may be cystocarps, sorus-like structures, and cavities, which are suggested to be similar to conceptacles.

Due to the overall appearance of Thallophyca, it has been compared to extant forms of Coralline algae, and as such has been postured to be an early stem group corallinalean red alga. It was also most likely a benthic alga, inferred from how its lobate protrusions and tissues grew, which can be seen in the large lobes of Thallophyca specimens, which radiate from a centre point.

== Taphonomy ==
Thallophyca is a part of the wider Weng'an Biota of the Doushantuo Formation, which is found within phosphate rocks of Weng'an, Fuquan and Kaiyang Countys. The material in which the fossils of this biota, such as Thallophyca, are made of are predominately kerogen, giving them a dark-brown to amber-coloured appearance. The cellular tissues within these fossils are notably well preserved, with cells also only experiencing standard de-gradational changes, such as the shrinking of certain cells like the protoplasts. This highly detailed preservation is noted to be likely due to a rapid mineralisation before decay could occur, possibly further helped by increased phosphate in the oceans at the time of deposition of the Weng'an Biota.

== Taxonomy ==
To date, Thallophyca contains three valid species, and one invalid species, which are as follows:

Species	Authority	Type locality	Notes	Refs
Thallophyca ramosa	Zhang (1989)	Doushantuo Formation, South China	valid	Type species
Thallophyca simplicia	Zhang (1989)	Doushantuo Formation, South China	invalid	Synonym of T. ramosa.
Thallophyca corrugata	Zhang & Yuan (1992)	Doushantuo Formation, South China	valid	
Thallophyca phylloformis	Zhang & Yuan (1992)	Doushantuo Formation, South China	valid	

== See also ==
- Thallophycoides
- Ediacaran biota
