= Neoprincipia =

Neoprincipia Temporal range: Visean

Scientific classification
- Clade: Archaeplastida
- Division: Rhodophyta
- Class: Florideophyceae
- Stem group: Corallinales
- Family: †Archaeolithophyllaceae
- Genus: †Neoprincipia; Cózar & Vachard, 2003

Species
- N. guadiatica Cózar & Vachard, 2003; N. tethysiana Cózar & Vachard, 2003

Extinct genus of algae

Neoprincipia is interpreted as the earliest crown-group red algae.
