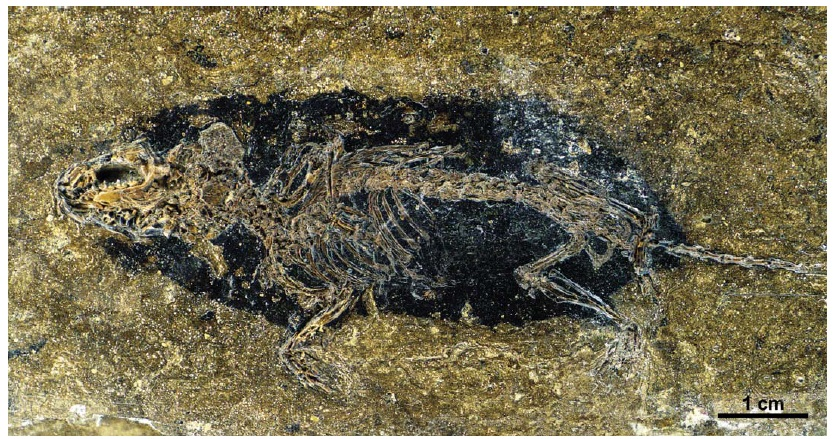
- Fossil

Scientific classification
- Kingdom: Animalia
- Phylum: Chordata
- Class: Mammalia
- Order: Eulipotyphla
- Family: †Heterosoricidae
- Genus: †Lusorex; Storch & Qiu, 2004

Type species
- †Lusorex taishanensis Storch & Qiu, 2004

= Lusorex =

Lusorex Temporal range: Miocene

Extinct genus of mammals

Lusorex is an extinct genus of heterosoricid shrew that lived in China during the Miocene. The only species is L. taishanensis, fossils of which are kept at the Paleozoological Museum of China.
