= Thallophycoides =

Thallophycoides Temporal range: Ediacaran ~635–551 Ma

Scientific classification
- Domain: Eukaryota
- Clade: Archaeplastida
- Division: Rhodophyta
- Genus: †Thallophycoides; Zhang & Yuan, 1992
- Species: †T. phloeatus

Binomial name
- †Thallophycoides phloeatus Zhang & Yuan, 1992

Synonyms
- Corticina Zhang & Yuan, 1992; C. irregularia Zhang & Yuan, 1992

Extinct genus of algae

Thallophycoides is an undifferentiated, globular, non-mineralized alga from the Ediacaran period of China. It is a monotypic genus, containing only Thallophycoides phloeatus.

== Discovery and naming ==
Fossil material of Thallophycoides was found in the middle of the Doushantuo Formation, Guizhou Province of South China and formally described in 1989.

The generic name Thallophycoides refers to its similarities with the genus Thallophyca. The specific name phloeatus derives from the Greek word Phloe, to mean "skin or bark", in reference to the cortical cells of the thallus.

== Description ==
Thallophycoides phloeatus is a globular alga that is millimetric to centimetric in its dimensions, (Note: No proper measurements were ever mentioned in the original paper, only measurements for the thallus.) with a thallus that can get up to 1.5 mm (0.1 in) in length and 1.1 mm (0.0 in) in width. The medullary cells are spheroidal to ellipsoidal in shape, and are tightly packed together, whilst the cortical cells are often found empty, with all cells sitting around 1.7–3.1 μm (0–0 in) in diameter. Due to the lack of any notable cell or thallus differentiation between these two cells, it has been postured to be either an early or stem group florideophyte red algae.

Thallophycoides was originally considered to be a free-floating algae, floating on the waters surface, although recent studies suggest it to be a benthic alga, inferred from how its lobate protrusions and tissues grew.

== See also ==
- Thallophyca
- Ediacaran biota
