= Paramecia (alga) =

Paramecia Temporal range: Doushantou

Scientific classification
- Domain: Eukaryota
- Clade: Archaeplastida
- Division: Rhodophyta
- Class: Florideophyceae
- Order: Corallinales
- Stem group: Corallinaceae
- Genus: †Paramecia; Zhang & Yuan, 1992

Species
- P. incognata Zhang & Yuan, 1992

Extinct genus of algae

Paramecia is a non-mineralized Ediacaran alga with a differentiated, compartmentalized thallus. This alga probably had multiple phases in its lifecycle, as possible reproductive structures have been identified.
