= Graticula =

Graticula Temporal range: Wenlock

Scientific classification
- Clade: Archaeplastida
- Division: Rhodophyta
- Class: Florideophyceae
- Stem group: Corallinales
- Family: Graticulaceae
- Genus: Graticula; Brooke & Riding, 1998

Species
- G. gotlandica (Rothpletz 1908)

Synonyms
- Craticula Brooke & Riding; Solenopora gotlandica Rothpletz 1908; Solenopora gracilis Garwood & Goodyear

Extinct genus of algae

Graticula, formerly incorrectly named Craticula, is a genus of Palaeozoic coralline alga. They form the framework of reef rocks in the Silurian of Gotland, from the Högklint, Slite and Halla groups.

The Graticulaceae closely resemble the Cretaceous Solenoporaceae, and are only really differentiated by their stratigraphic position.

Graticula mineralized with calcite.
