= Maimonachaetetes =

Maimonachaetetes Temporal range: Mississippian

Scientific classification
- Clade: Archaeplastida
- Division: Rhodophyta
- Class: incertae sedis
- Genus: †Maimonachaetetes; Cózar & Vachard, 2006

Extinct genus of algae

Maimonachaetetes is a thalloid red alga of uncertain placement.
