= 2026 in paleobotany =

This paleobotany list records new fossil plant taxa that were announced or described during the year 2026, as well as notes other significant paleobotany discoveries and events which occurred during the year.

== Algae ==
=== Charophytes ===
Name	Novelty	Status	Authors	Age	Unit	Location	Synonymized taxa	Notes	Images
Acroleptochara cynetica	Gen. et sp. nov	Valid	Pérez-Cano	Early Cretaceous	Luz Fm.	Portugal		A member of Characeae. Genus includes new species A. cynetica.	
Echinochara rebellis	Sp. nov	Valid	Pérez-Cano	Early Cretaceous	Luz Fm.	Portugal		A member of Clavatoraceae.	
Lychnothamnus pileatus	Sp. nov	Valid	Pérez-Cano	Early Cretaceous	Luz Fm.	Portugal		A member of Characeae.	
Nitellopsis (Campaniella) lilliputiensis	Sp. nov	Valid	Pérez-Cano	Early Cretaceous	Luz Fm.	Portugal		A member of Characeae.	

=== Chlorophytes ===
Name	Novelty	Status	Authors	Age	Unit	Location	Synonymized taxa	Notes	Images
Ericiasphaera laufeldii	Comb. nov	Valid	(Vidal)	Tonian	Visingsö Group	Sweden		A unicellular chlorophyte belonging to the group Chlorophyceae; moved from Trachysphaeridium laufeldi Vidal (1976).	
Globulus	Gen. et sp. nov	Valid	Moczydłowska & Willman	Tonian	Visingsö Group	Sweden		A colonial chlorophyte belonging to the group Chlorophyceae. The type species is G. unitus.	
Leiosphaeridia fibrosa	Sp. nov	Valid	Moczydłowska & Willman	Tonian	Visingsö Group	Sweden		A unicellular chlorophyte belonging to the group Chlorophyceae.	
Leiosphaeridia lacrimaforma	Sp. nov	Valid	Moczydłowska & Willman	Tonian	Visingsö Group	Sweden		A unicellular chlorophyte belonging to the group Chlorophyceae.	
Leiosphaeridia spinopylomifera	Sp. nov	Valid	Moczydłowska & Willman	Tonian	Visingsö Group	Sweden		A unicellular chlorophyte belonging to the group Chlorophyceae.	
Palaeocystis	Gen. et sp. nov	Valid	Moczydłowska & Willman	Tonian	Visingsö Group	Sweden		A colonial chlorophyte belonging to the group Chlorophyceae. The type species is P. novum.	
Pterospermella primaria	Sp. nov	Valid	Moczydłowska & Willman	Tonian	Visingsö Group	Sweden		A unicellular chlorophyte belonging to the group Pyramimonadales.	
Salpingoporella vivariensis	Sp. nov		Bucur et al.	Early Cretaceous (Aptian)		France		A member of Dasycladales.	
Similiclypeina hadrianii	Sp. nov		Bucur et al.	Early Cretaceous (Aptian)		France		A member of Dasycladales.	

=== Ochrophytes ===
Name	Novelty	Status	Authors	Age	Type locality	Location	Notes	Images
Forticellula	Gen et sp. nov	Valid	Siver	Early Eocene; Ypresian	Eocene Okanagan Highlands; Horsefly shales	Canada; British Columbia	A tabellariaceous fragilariophycean diatom. The type species is F. wolfei	

=== Rhodophytes ===
Name	Novelty	Status	Authors	Age	Unit	Location	Synonymized taxa	Notes	Images
Vetusceramium	Gen. et sp. nov		Du et al.	Ediacaran	Doushantuo Formation	China		A member of Ceramiales belonging to the family Ceramiaceae. The type species is V. sinense.	

=== Other algae ===
Name	Novelty	Status	Authors	Age	Unit	Location	Synonymized taxa	Notes	Images
Baculiphyca yunnanoense	Sp. nov		Li et al.	Ediacaran	Dengying Formation	China		A macroalga of uncertain affinities.	
Houjiashania folim	Sp. nov		Li et al.	Ediacaran	Dengying Formation	China		A macroalga of uncertain affinities.	
Jiangchuania qingshuigouensis	Sp. nov		Li et al.	Ediacaran	Dengying Formation	China		A macroalga of uncertain affinities.	
Mengeosphaera exomembrana	Sp. nov		Ye et al.	Ediacaran	Doushantuo Formation	China		An acritarch, possibly an algal cyst.	
Polyostiosphaera	Gen. et sp. nov		Chen et al.	Cambrian (Fortunian)	Kuanchuanpu Formation	China		A multicellular alga of uncertain affinities. Genus includes new species P. operculata.	
Sculpturimembrana	Gen. et sp. nov		Ye et al.	Ediacaran	Doushantuo Formation	China		An acritarch, possibly an algal cyst. Genus includes new species S. ancangpingensis.	
Urasphaera triformis	Sp. nov		Ye et al.	Ediacaran	Doushantuo Formation	China		An acritarch, possibly an algal cyst.	

=== Phycological research ===
- Review of research on preservation and evolutionary history of early macroalgae from preceding years is published by LoDuca (2026).
- New information on the anatomy of members of Eoconusphaeraceae, interpreted as supporting their identification as coccolithophores, is provided by Demangel et al. (2026).
- Mohammed et al. (2026) determine flask-shaped microfossils from the Dzhanytas Group (Kazakhstan) to be mid-Tonian in age, representing the oldest record of such microfossils reported to date, and interpret them as possible fossils of red algae.
- Mccandless & Droser (2026) study density and abundance of algae from the Nilpena Fossil Site within the Nilpena Ediacara National Park (Australia), and report evidence of larger size and of reduced morphological and taxonomic variation of algae from the studied site compared to algae from other Ediacaran localities.
- Evidence from the study of a macroalgal-dominated fossil assemblage from the Dengying Formation (Sichuan, China), indicative of greater resilience of macroalgae during the End-Ediacaran extinction compared to other groups of organisms, is presented by Zhang et al. (2026).
- Fossil evidence of persistence of multicellular algae belonging to the genus Wengania into the early Cambrian is reported from the Zhujiaqing Formation (Yunnan, China) by You, Shang & Liu (2026).
- Fossil algae with morphological similarities to Proterozoic and Cambrian vendotaenids are reported from the Ordovician Landeyran Formation (France) by Vayda, Birolini & Xiao (2026).
- Jeon et al. (2026) study the growth characteristics of Palaeoaplysina from the Permian (Asselian) strata of the Tyrrellfjellet Member of the Wordiekammen Formation (Svalbard, Norway), and interpret Palaeoaplysina as more likely to be an alga (probably a red alga) than a sponge or cnidarian.
- Zhao et al. (2026) link the displacement of green eukaryotic algae by phytoplankton groups whose plastids are derived from rhodophytes as the dominant marine phytoplankton in the early Mesozoic to structural characteristics of red lineage phytoplankton that enhanced their resistance to environmental reactive oxygen species.
- Evidence of changes of cellular structure of coralline algae from Meghalaya (northeast India) in response to environmental changes during the Paleocene–Eocene thermal maximum, resulting in the studied algae maintaining calcification in spite of high temperatures and acidification of surface waters, is presented by Melbourne, Sarkar & Schmidt (2026).
- A study on the anatomy and diversity in organization of Pachytheca from the Silurian and Devonian strata from Welsh Borderland (United Kingdom), interpreted as an organism of uncertain phylogenetic placement with most likely affinities with green algae, is published by Edwards et al. (2026).
- A new charophyte assemblage, including the earliest record of Characeae reported to date, is described from the Middle Triassic (Anisian) Guanling Formation (China) by Zhang et al. (2026).
- Peel (2026) describes new fossil material of Kordesphecia nyeboensis from the Cambrian Aftenstjernesø Formation (Greenland), and interprets its morphology as consistent with the interpretation of K. nyeboensis as a member of the stem group of Dasycladales.
- Iturain, Martínez & Olivera (2026) reconstruct the life cycle of Jurassic tasmanitid prasinophytes from the Los Molles Formation (Argentina).

== Non-vascular plants ==
=== Bryophyta ===
Name	Novelty	Status	Authors	Age	Unit	Location	Synonymized taxa	Notes	Images
Kimmerera	Gen. et sp. nov		Walker et al.	Late Cretaceous (Campanian)	Santa Marta Formation	Antarctica		A member of Bryopsida of uncertain affinities. The type species is K. cyanifera.	
Meteoriella parvicella	Sp. nov	Valid	Wolski, Kaczmarek & Ignatov	Eocene	Baltic amber	Europe (Baltic Sea region)		A moss belonging to the family Hylocomiaceae.	

=== Marchantiophyta ===
Name	Novelty	Status	Authors	Age	Unit	Location	Synonymized taxa	Notes	Images
Camptochila	Gen. et sp. nov	Valid	Jud & Nunes in Jud et al.	Eocene (Ypresian)	Huitrera Formation	Argentina		A liverwort of uncertain affinities. Genus includes new species C. eternautae.	
Dinckleria opaca	Sp. nov		Renner & Paulsen	Eocene	Anglesea amber	Australia		A liverwort, a species of Dinckleria.	
Frullania tseltal	Sp. nov		Juárez-Martínez et al.	Miocene	Mexican amber	Mexico		A liverwort, a species of Frullania.	
Frullania tsotsil	Sp. nov		Juárez-Martínez & Estrada-Ruiz in Juárez-Martínez et al.	Miocene	Mexican amber	Mexico		A liverwort, a species of Frullania.	
Marchesinia pauchi	Sp. nov	Valid	Juárez-Martínez, Gradstein & Estrada-Ruiz in Juárez-Martínez et al.	Miocene	Simojovel Formation (Mexican amber)	Mexico			
Metzgeriites gynothallicus	Sp. nov		Horcajada-Tejero, Blanco-Moreno & Martín-Abad	Early Cretaceous (Barremian)	La Huérguina Formation	Spain		A liverwort belonging to the family Metzgeriaceae.	

=== Non-vascular plant research ===
- Evidence from the study of moss fossil from north-eastern European Russia, indicative of evolution of leaf developmental pathway in Permian protosphagnacean mosses similar to that of extant Sphagnum, is presented by Ignatov et al. (2026).
- Tremblay & Mercadal (2026) interpret the dark cells preserved in Paleozoic liverwort fossils as homologous with oil body cells of extant liverwort.

== Lycophytes ==
Name	Novelty	Status	Authors	Age	Unit	Location	Synonymized taxa	Notes	Images
Nowenia	Gen. et sp. nov		El-Abdallah & Tomescu in El-Abdallah et al.	Devonian	Beartooth Butte Formation	United States (Wyoming)		A zosterophyll. The type species is N. matsunagae.	
Selaginellites huatingensis	Sp. nov		Song & Ding in Song et al.	Middle Jurassic	Yanan Formation	China		A member of Selaginellales.	
Sinostigmaria	Gen. et sp. nov		Yang et al.	Carboniferous (Viséan)	Xiangbai Formation	China		A member of Isoetales. Genus includes new species S. yisis.	

=== Lycophyte research ===
- A study on the anatomy of Guangdedendron micrum and on the phylogenetic relationships of Devonian and Carboniferous lycopsids, interpreted as indicative of evolution consistent with model of punctuated equilibria, is published by Xu et al. (2026).
- Pott & Schöllmann (2026) describe new fossil material of Lepidodendron aculeatum from the Carboniferous (Bashkirian) strata from the Hagen-Vorhalle Lagerstätte (Germany), and emend the diagnosis of the species.
- D'Antonio et al. (2026) report evidence of preservation of internal three-dimensional structure in specimens of Stigmaria from the Carboniferous strata in Illinois, Indiana and Iowa (United States), and evidence of differences between the rooting systems of Stigmaria and other rhizomorphic lycopsids, indicating that the studied structures likely are not homologous.
- Xu et al. (2026) report evidence from morphology and stable isotope analysis from Permian–Triassic transitional lycophytes from southwest China interpreted as consistent with use of crassulacean acid metabolism photosynthesis similar to the one seen in extant Isoetales, and interpret the physiology of the studied lycophytes as a possible factor enabling their survival during the Permian–Triassic extinction event and subsequent recovery.
- Peng et al. (2026) interpret Lycostrobus scottii as a member of Pleuromeiaceae on the basis of the study of fossil material from the Lower Jurassic (Hettangian) strata from Sweden; the authors also study the phylogenetic relationships of Devonian to Jurassic lycopsids and reconstruct the distribution of pleuromeian lycopsids during the Triassic-Jurassic transition, reporting evidence of their short-lived proliferation in pioneer communities in the aftermath of collapse of forest ecosystems at the end of the Triassic.

== Ferns and fern allies ==
=== Cyatheales ===
Name	Novelty	Status	Authors	Age	Unit	Location	Synonymized taxa	Notes	Images
Lophosoria myanmarica	Sp. nov		Li in Li et al.	Late Cretaceous (Cenomanian)	Kachin amber	Myanmar		A species of Lophosoria.	
Loxsomopsis minor	Sp. nov		Li in Li, Li & Ma	Late Cretaceous (Cenomanian)	Kachin amber	Myanmar		A species of Loxsomopsis.	

=== Gleicheniales ===
Name	Novelty	Status	Authors	Age	Unit	Location	Synonymized taxa	Notes	Images
Clathropteris tuquanensis	Sp. nov		Wang, Zhang & Liang in Wang et al.	Middle Jurassic (Callovian)	Wanbao Formation	China		A member of the family Dipteridaceae.	
Thaumatopteris paucipinnata	Sp. nov		Procopio Rodríguez et al.	Middle Triassic	Cortaderita Formation	Argentina		A member of the family Dipteridaceae.	

=== Marattiales ===
Name	Novelty	Status	Authors	Age	Unit	Location	Synonymized taxa	Notes	Images
Cyathocarpus felicianoi	Sp. nov		Correia, Šimůnek & Pereira	Carboniferous (Gzhelian)	Douro Carboniferous Basin	Portugal		A member of Marattiales belonging to the family Psaroniaceae.	
Danaeopsis huatingensis	Sp. nov		Sun & Dengin Sun et al.	Middle Triassic	Tongchuan Formation	China		A member of the family Marattiaceae.	
Danaeopsis xunyiensis	Sp. nov		Sun & Dengin Sun et al.	Middle Triassic	Tongchuan Formation	China		A member of the family Marattiaceae.	
Polymorphopteris mei	Sp. nov		Li et al.	Permian		China		A marattialean fern frond	

=== Osmundales ===
Name	Novelty	Status	Authors	Age	Unit	Location	Synonymized taxa	Notes	Images
Todites holmesii	Sp. nov		Retallack	Early Triassic		Australia		An osmundalean fern.	

=== Polypodiales ===
Name	Novelty	Status	Authors	Age	Unit	Location	Synonymized taxa	Notes	Images
Coniopteris glaesifilix	Sp. nov		Wang, Tao, Zhang, Wang, & Shi in Wang et al.	Cretaceous (Albian-Cenomanian)	Kachin amber	Myanmar		A polypodialean fern.	
Polystichum espinarensis	Sp. nov	Valid	Aliaga-Castillo et al.	Pliocene		Peru		A species of Polystichum. Published online in 2025; the final version of the article naming it was published in 2026.	

=== Salviniales ===
Name	Novelty	Status	Authors	Age	Unit	Location	Synonymized taxa	Notes	Images
Salvinia dashtensis	Sp. nov	Valid	Spagnuolo in Spagnuolo et al.	Eocene	Ghazij Formation	Pakistan			

=== Other fern allies ===
Name	Novelty	Status	Authors	Age	Unit	Location	Synonymized taxa	Notes	Images
Keraphyton talentii	Sp. nov		Champreux, Meyer-Berthaud & Decombeix	Devonian (Famennian)	Mandowa Mudstone Formation	Australia		A member of Iridopteridales.	
Paradoxopteris huertasii	Sp. nov	Valid	Palma-Castro et al.	Early Cretaceous (Aptian)	Paja Formation	Colombia		A paradoxopterid polypodiopsid fern of uncertain affinities.	

=== Pteridological research ===
- Fu et al. (2026) study the phloem evolution in ferns on the basis of data from extant and extinct taxa, reporting evidence of morphological changes suggestive of decrease in phloem conductivity throughout the evolutionary history of ferns.
- DiMichele et al. (2026) study the fossil record of Carboniferous (Pennsylvanian) marattialean ferns from the Illinois and Appalachian basins, reporting evidence of contrasting patterns of abundance of the studied ferns reconstructed on the basis of fossil record of their compressions and impressions and on the basis of coal-ball and coal-palynological assemblages.
- Hollaar et al. (2026) report palynological evidence from strata from the Triassic-Jurassic transition in Europe interpreted as indicative of spread of fern-dominated savannas after forest collapse during the Triassic–Jurassic extinction, and of continental-scale fires of these savannas.
- A study on changes of distribution and on the evolutionary history of members of the genera Equisetites and Neocalamites in Europe, Central Asia and Siberia during the Early and Middle Jurassic is published by Frolov & Mashchuk (2026).
- Urrea, Yañez & Flores (2026) reconstruct the evolutionary history of Osmundaceae on the basis of total-evidence analysis of data from extant and extinct taxa.

== Conifers ==
=== Araucariaceae ===
Name	Novelty	Status	Authors	Age	Unit	Location	Synonymized taxa	Notes	Images
Araucaria benignae	Sp. nov		Kunzmann et al.	Early Cretaceous (Aptian)	Crato Formation	Brazil			

=== Cheirolepidiaceae ===
Name	Novelty	Status	Authors	Age	Unit	Location	Synonymized taxa	Notes	Images
Arkansia axsmithii	Sp. nov		Andruchow-Colombo & Matsunaga	Early Cretaceous	Holly Creek Formation	United States (Arkansas)			
Brachyphyllum ordosensis	Sp. nov		Wei et al.	Early Jurassic	Fu'xian Formation	China			
Classostrobus amealensis	Sp. nov		Tekleva et al.	Early Cretaceous (Hauterivian)		Portugal			
Pararaucaria utahensis	Sp. nov		Gee, Howell & Dayvault	Late Jurassic	Morrison Formation	United States (Utah)			
Pseudofrenelopsis axsmithii	Sp. nov		Andruchow-Colombo & Matsunaga	Early Cretaceous	Holly Creek Formation	United States (Arkansas)			
Pseudofrenelopsis pingliangensis	Sp. nov		Lou & Ding in Lou et al.	Early Cretaceous (Albian)	Madongshan Formation	China			

=== Cupressaceae ===
Name	Novelty	Status	Authors	Age	Unit	Location	Synonymized taxa	Notes	Images
Austrocedrus vetus	Sp. nov		Pfeiler, Matsunaga & Atkinson in Pfeiler et al.	Late Cretaceous (Campanian)	Santa Marta Formation	Antarctica			
Austrohamia vitrea	Sp. nov		Molano et al.	Jurassic	La Matilde Formation	Argentina		A member of Cupressaceae sensu lato.	
Cascadiastrobus	Gen. et sp. nov		Dostal, Stockey & Rothwell	Eocene		Canada (British Columbia)		A seed cone of a member of Cupressaceae. Genus includes new species C. beardii.	
Cupressinoxylon marquesii	Sp. nov		Nhamutole & Bamford	Permian	Matinde Formation	Mozambique			
Kamikistrobus	Gen. et sp. nov		Jiang & Yamada	Late Cretaceous (Turonian)	Yezo Group	Japan		A member of the subfamily Taxodioideae. Genus includes new species K. primulus.	
Sequoia primaria	Comb. nov		(Miki)	Miocene	Tokiguchi Porcelain Clay Formation	Japan		Moved from Sequoiadendron primarium Miki (1965).	
Thuja lingbaoensis	Sp. nov		Wang in Wang et al.	Eocene	Xiangcheng Formation	China		A species of Thuja.	

=== Pinaceae ===
Name	Novelty	Status	Authors	Age	Unit	Location	Synonymized taxa	Notes	Images
Pinus izberdana	Sp. nov		Nosova in Nosova, Melnikov & Chumanova	Late Cretaceous (Santonian-Campanian)		Russia (Orenburg Oblast)		A pine.	
Schizolepidopsis gerrienneii	Sp. nov		De Brito et al.	Early Jurassic		Belgium		A member or a relative of the family Pinaceae.	
Tsuga zhuoziensis	Sp. nov	Valid	Xiao et al.	Miocene	Hannuoba Formation	China		A species of Tsuga. Announced online in 2025; the final version of the article naming it was published in 2026.	

=== Podocarpaceae ===
Name	Novelty	Status	Authors	Age	Unit	Location	Synonymized taxa	Notes	Images
Circoporoxylon bighornense	Sp. nov	Valid	Hoff & Gee in Hoff, Gee & Storrs	Late Jurassic	Morrison Formation	United States (Montana)			
Podocarpoxylon paralambertii	Sp. nov	Valid	Ramos, Brea & Kröhling	Pleistocene	El Palmar Formation	Argentina			

=== Taxaceae ===
Name	Novelty	Status	Authors	Age	Unit	Location	Synonymized taxa	Notes	Images
Torreya albertensis	Sp. nov		Halbwidl, Seyfullah & West	Late Cretaceous	Horseshoe Canyon Formation	Canada (Alberta)		A species of Torreya.	

=== Other conifers ===
Name	Novelty	Status	Authors	Age	Unit	Location	Synonymized taxa	Notes	Images
Lindleycladus changtuensis	Sp. nov		Yu & Liang in Yu et al.	Early Cretaceous (Aptian)	Shahezi Formation	China		A member of the family Podozamitaceae.	
Prototaxoxylon sanpedrense	Sp. nov		Siegloch et al.	Late Triassic (Norian-Rhaetian)	Mata Sequence of the Santa Maria Supersequence	Brazil			
Texoxylon	Gen. et sp. nov		Singleton & Costanza	Carboniferous (Kasimovian)	Palo Pinto Formation	United States (Texas)		A member of Coniferopsida of uncertain affinities. Genus includes new species T. fambroensis.	

=== Conifer research ===
- Kürschner et al. (2026) report the first discovery of the conifer Quadrocladus from the Lower Permian strata of the Gipshuken Formation (Spitsbergen, Svalbard, Norway).
- Chen et al. (2026) identify fossil wood of Shimakuroxylon japonicum from the Jurassic (Callovian to Oxfordian) strata of the Xiali Formation (Tibet, China), extending known range of the genus Shimakuroxylon.
- Xie, Gee & Griebeler (2026) determine the most robust empirical model that can be used to reconstruct the stature of fossil members of Pinaceae.
- Evidence of links between decline of Tsuga canadensis in North America and regional effects of climate changes during the Holocene is presented by Shuman (2026).
- Xie et al. (2026) interpret Agathoxylon wood from the Upper Triassic strata of the Löwenstein Formation (Germany) as evidence of presence of tall, long-lived trees in Norian forests in Central Europe, growing in environment with seasonal climate and episodic environmental stress.
- Siegloch et al. (2026) describe fossil material of Agathoxylon pseudoparenchymatosum from the Upper Triassic strata of the Mata Sequence of the Santa Maria Supersequence (Brazil), and report evidence of wood growth interruptions consistent with unstable climatic conditions.
- Palma-Castro et al. (2026) report the discovery of Agathoxylon wood from the Upper Jurassic strata of the Girón Group (Colombia), representing the earliest record of this genus in northwestern Gondwana reported to date.
- Zhou et al. (2026) reconstruct the general morphology of Pagiophyllum maculosum on the basis of the study of the first fossil material reported from the Lower Jurassic strata in China.
- Garcia Massini et al. (2026) describe fossil wood with Protocupressinoxylon-type anatomy from the La Matilde Formation (Argentina), preserved with anchored seedling sprouts as well as with evidence of fungal and arthropod-mediated decay and evidence of presence of decay-associated microbiota, and interpret the studied wood as fossil evidence of nurse logs in the Jurassic La Matilde community.
- Evidence from the study of the Cenozoic fossil record of Metasequoia, indicative of southward shift of its distribution during the Neogene in response to global aridification and subsequent contraction of its range in response to climate changes during the Pleistocene, is presented by Chen et al. (2026).
- Fossils of Metasequoia cf. glyptostroboides representing the southernmost records of the genus Metasequoia worldwide are described from the Oligocene strata in Yunnan (China) and in Laos by Wang et al. (2026).
- Piguet et al. (2026) study the composition of the conifer wood assemblages from the Paleocene (Thanetian) strata from the Rivecourt site and from the Eocene (Ypresian) strata from the Le Quesnoy site (Paris Basin, France), finding no evidence of a significant impact of the Paleocene–Eocene thermal maximum on the composition of the studied assemblages.
- Taxonomic revision of coniferous woods from the Oligocene strata of the Petroșani Basin (Romania) is published by Călin, Popa & Pirnea (2026).

== Bennettitales ==
Name	Novelty	Status	Authors	Age	Unit	Location	Synonymized taxa	Notes	Images
Bugdaevaea	Gen. et sp. nov	Valid	Bickner et al.	Early Cretaceous	Tevshiingovi Formation	Mongolia		A fossil seed attributable to the Bennettitales-Erdtmanithecales-Gnetales group. Genus includes new species B. lignitica.	
Marythodaya	Nom. nov	Valid	Deshmukh	Early Cretaceous (Albian)	Potomac Group	United States (Virginia)		A seed plant belonging to the informal grouping Bennettitales-Erdtmanithecales-Gnetales; a replacement name for Thodaya Friis, Crane & Pedersen (2019).	
Nilssoniopteris baojishanensis	Sp. nov		Zhang & Xin in Zhang et al.	Middle Jurassic (Aalenian–Bajocian)	Yaojie Formation	China			
Nilssoniopteris macrophylla	Sp. nov		Wang, Tan, Zhang & Sun in Wang et al.	Early Cretaceous	Binggou Formation	China			
Nilssoniopteris specialis	Sp. nov		Zhang & Xin in Zhang et al.	Middle Jurassic (Aalenian–Bajocian)	Yaojie Formation	China			
Nosovaea	Gen. et sp. nov	Valid	Bickner et al.	Early Cretaceous		Mongolia		A fossil seed attributable to the Bennettitales-Erdtmanithecales-Gnetales group. Genus includes new species N. striata.	
Pterophyllum mangniuhaiensis	Sp. nov		Xiang, Zhang & Liang in Xiang et al.	Middle Jurassic (Callovian)	Wanbao Formation	China			
Pterophyllum oskolicum	Sp. nov		Nosova	Middle Jurassic		Russia (Belgorod Oblast)			
Williamsonia runnegari	Sp. nov		Retallack	Early Triassic	Banks Wall Sandstone	Australia			
Zamites ambigua	Sp. nov		Morales-Toledo, Zepeda-Martínez & Cevallos-Ferriz	Middle Jurassic (Bathonian–Callovian)	Otlaltepec Formation	Mexico			

=== Bennettitalean research ===
- Villalva & Gnaedinger (2026) report the discovery of bennettitopsid and gnetopsid reproductive organs from the Upper Triassic strata of the Laguna Colorada Formation (Argentina).
- Xu et al. (2026) revise the cuticle structures of Pterophyllum crassinervum and confirms its taxonomic validity.
- Xiang et al. (2026) study the distribution of Pterophyllum throughout its evolutionary history, report evidence of a persistent thermophilic niche throughout the Mesozoic, and interpret the disappearance of Pterophyllum from the fossil record during the Cretaceous as possibly linked to climatic perturbations related to Oceanic Anoxic Event 1.
- Friis et al. (2026) provide new information on the seed structure of Cycadeoidea morierei, interpreted as supporting close affinities between Bennettitales and Gnetales.

== Flowering plants ==
=== Magnoliids ===
Name	Novelty	Status	Authors	Age	Unit	Location	Synonymized taxa	Notes	Images
Extroparvum	Gen. et sp. nov		Tang, Matsunaga & Atkinson	Late Cretaceous (Coniacian)	Comox Formation	Canada (British Columbia)		A member of the family Lauraceae. The type species is E. occidentale.	
Fissistigma jarwaense	Sp. nov	Valid	Saxena, Doweld & Prasad	Miocene		India		Announced (under the name "Melodorum jarwaense") by Tripathi, Pandey & Prasad (2002); validated in 2026.	
Maasia palaeosumatrana	Sp. nov	Valid	Saxena, Doweld & Prasad	Miocene		India		Announced (under the name "Polyalthia palaeosumatrana") by Tripathi, Pandey & Prasad (2002); validated in 2026.	
Miliusa miovelutina	Sp. nov	Valid	Saxena, Doweld & Prasad	Miocene		India		Announced by Tripathi, Pandey & Prasad (2002); validated in 2026.	
Phoebe himachalensis	Sp. nov	Valid	Saxena, Doweld & Prasad	Miocene		India		Announced by Pandey et al. (2023); validated in 2026.	
Trimeriantha	Gen. et sp. nov		Wu et al.	Late Cretaceous (Turonian-Santonian)	Klikov Formation	Czech Republic		A member of Piperales. The type species is T. monopolyada.	

==== Magnoliid research ====
- Rubalcava-Knoth et al. (2026) identify leaf architecture characters that can be used for identification of fossil members of Lauraceae at the family level.

=== Monocots ===
==== Alismatales ====
Name	Novelty	Status	Authors	Age	Unit	Location	Synonymized taxa	Notes	Images
Anomacolocasioides	Gen. et sp. nov		Gieser, Donovan & Herrera in Gieser et al.	Eocene	Green River Formation	United States (Wyoming)		A member of the family Araceae. Genus includes new species A. demkovichorum.	
Eospirodela	Gen. et sp. nov		Ali, Almeida & Khan in Ali et al.	Eocene	Palana Formation	India		A member of the family Araceae. The type species is E. indica.	
Gigantosagittata	Gen. et sp. nov		Gieser, Donovan & Herrera in Gieser et al.	Eocene	Green River Formation	United States (Wyoming)		A member of the family Araceae. Genus includes new species G. graingeriana.	

==== Arecales ====
Name	Novelty	Status	Authors	Age	Unit	Location	Synonymized taxa	Notes	Images
Palmoxylon anciborae	Sp. nov		Vera et al.	Late Cretaceous (Maastrichtian)	Chorrillo Formation	Argentina		A fossil palm stem.	
Palmoxylon caryoteaeoides	Sp. nov		Kumar et al.	Cretaceous-Paleocene transition	Deccan Intertrappean Beds	India		A fossil palm stem.	
Palmoxylon hainanense	Sp. nov		Huang, Khan & Jin inHuang et al.	Miocene	Changpo Formation	China		A fossil palm stem.	
Palmoxylon kospi	Sp. nov		Vera et al.	Late Cretaceous (Maastrichtian)	Chorrillo Formation	Argentina		A fossil palm stem.	
Palmoxylon mioflabellifer	Sp. nov		Biswas et al.	Miocene-Pliocene	Tipam Group	India		A fossil palm stem.	
Palmoxylon nannorrhopsoides	Sp. nov		Kumar et al.	Cretaceous-Paleocene transition	Deccan Intertrappean Beds	India		A fossil palm stem.	
Palmoxylon sabaleaeoides	Sp. nov		Kumar et al.	Cretaceous-Paleocene transition	Deccan Intertrappean Beds	India		A fossil palm stem.	
Phoenicites deccansis	Sp. nov		Kumar & Khan	Cretaceous-Paleocene transition	Deccan Intertrappean Beds	India		A pinnate palm leaf.	
Pindocarpon	Gen. et sp. nov		Muci, Passalia & Iglesias	Miocene	Chichinales Formation	Argentina		A fossil palm fruit. The type species is P. chichinalensis.	

==== Zingiberales ====
Name	Novelty	Status	Authors	Age	Unit	Location	Synonymized taxa	Notes	Images
Alpinia siwalica	Sp. nov	Valid	Saxena, Doweld & Prasad	Miocene		India		Announced by Prasad, Ghosh & Tripathi (2004); validated in 2026.	
Paleozingiberum	Gen. et sp. nov		Chandra, Shukla & Shukla	Paleogene		India		Genus includes new species P. gurhanensis.	

==== Other monocots ====
Name	Novelty	Status	Authors	Age	Unit	Location	Synonymized taxa	Notes	Images
Tomlinsoniella	Gen. et sp. nov		Tiffney et al.	Cretaceous (Albian–Cenomanian)	Dakota Formation	United States (Kansas)		Possibly a coryphoid palm or a member of an extinct monocot lineage convergent with palms. Genus includes new species T. pedicellata.	

==== Monocot research ====
- Evidence from the study of the fossil record of seagrasses, indicative of links between the biogeographical distribution of seagrasses throughout the evolutionary history of the group and long-term climate fluctuations, is presented by Tuya et al. (2026).
- Redescription and a study on the affinities of Graminocarpon is published by Manchester et al. (2026), who interpret the studied plant as a possible member or relative of Arecaceae.
- Bellot et al. (2026) reconstruct the evolutionary history of palms on the basis of phylogeny of extant members of the group determined from data from nuclear genes and on the basis of the study of the fossil record of the group.
- Redescription and a study on the affinities of Palmoxylon santarosense, P. rionegrense and P. valchetense from the Allen Formation (Argentina) is published by Vera (2026).
- Kumar et al. (2026) identify fossil material of Callistemonites from the Deccan Intertrappean Beds (India) as rachillae of members of Arecaceae.
- Hermans et al. (2026) reconstruct the composition of the Eocene–Miocene grass assemblages from Turkey and central North America on the basis of the study of phytoliths, reporting evidence of presence of Pooideae in both regions by the Eocene.

=== Basal eudicots ===
Name	Novelty	Status	Authors	Age	Unit	Location	Synonymized taxa	Notes	Images
Appianocarpa	Gen. et sp. nov	Valid	Rico et al.	Eocene		Canada (British Columbia)		A member of the family Menispermaceae. Genus includes new species A. canadense. Announced in 2025; the final version of the article naming it was published in 2026.	
Buxus winterscheidii	Sp. nov		Sachse in Sachse & Wappler	Miocene	Upper Freshwater Molasse	Germany			
Platanus orientalifolia	Sp. nov		Zhu & Jia in Jia et al.	Eocene	Xiangcheng Formation	China		A species of Platanus.	
Sargentodoxa guipingensis	Sp. nov		Song & Jin in Song et al.	Miocene		China			
Scalarixylon lahar	Sp. nov		Leggate, Fabillo & Rozefelds	Oligocene		Australia		Fossil wood of a member of the family Proteaceae.	

==== Basal eudicot research ====
- Lamont et al. (2026) reconstruct the evolutionary history of Embothriinae on the basis of data from extant taxa and from the fossil record of pollen, interpreted as supporting northwestern Gondwanan origin of the group.

=== Superasterids ===
==== Cornales ====
Name	Novelty	Status	Authors	Age	Unit	Location	Synonymized taxa	Notes	Images
Davidia indica	Sp. nov	Valid	Ali, Su & Khan in Ali et al.	Eocene		India		A species of Davidia. Published online in 2025; the final version of the article naming it was published in 2026.	

==== Ericales ====
Name	Novelty	Status	Authors	Age	Unit	Location	Synonymized taxa	Notes	Images
Ardisia siwalika	Sp. nov	Valid	Saxena, Doweld & Prasad	Miocene		India		Announced by Prasad et al. (2025); validated in 2026.	
Gordonia tubersedea	Sp. nov	Valid	Lott & Manchester	Eocene	Aycross Formation	United States (Wyoming)			
Herendeeniodoxa	Gen. et sp. nov	Valid	Pigg et al.	Paleocene	Sentinel Butte Formation	United States (North Dakota)		A member of the family Actinidiaceae. Genus includes new species H. willistonensis.	
Sarcosperma mioarboreum	Sp. nov	Valid	Saxena, Doweld & Prasad	Miocene		India		Announced by Prasad, Ghosh & Tripathi (2004); validated in 2026.	
Tetrameristophyllum	Gen. et sp. nov		Bhatia & Srivastava	Oligocene		India		A member of the family Tetrameristaceae. Genus includes new species T. makumensis.	

==== Gentianales ====
Name	Novelty	Status	Authors	Age	Unit	Location	Synonymized taxa	Notes	Images
Aganosmophyllum	Gen. et sp. nov		Bhatia & Srivastava in Bhatia, Adhikari & Srivastava	Paleocene	Tura Formation	India		A member of the family Apocynaceae. The type species is A. nongalbibraensis.	

==== Icacinales ====
Name	Novelty	Status	Authors	Age	Unit	Location	Synonymized taxa	Notes	Images
Goweria bacatana	Sp. nov		Puente-Santos & Carvalho in Puente-Santos et al.	Paleocene	Bogotá Formation	Colombia		A member of the family Icacinaceae.	
Mappia siwalika	Sp. nov	Valid	Prasad et al.	Miocene		India		A species of Mappia.	
Palaeophytocrene paramoae	Sp. nov		Puente-Santos & Carvalho in Puente-Santos et al.	Paleocene	Bogotá Formation	Colombia		A member of the family Icacinaceae.	
Punctiuga	Gen. et sp. nov		Puente-Santos & Carvalho in Puente-Santos et al.	Paleocene	Bogotá Formation	Colombia		A member of the family Icacinaceae. The type species is P. bachue.	

==== Lamiales ====
Name	Novelty	Status	Authors	Age	Unit	Location	Synonymized taxa	Notes	Images
Fraxinoxylon sihongense	Sp. nov		Zhu, Li & Cheng in Zhu et al.	Miocene	Xiacaowan Formation	China		A member of the family Oleaceae.	

==== Solanales ====
Name	Novelty	Status	Authors	Age	Unit	Location	Synonymized taxa	Notes	Images
Albionites	Gen. et comb. nov		Deanna & Knapp in Deanna et al.	Eocene	Poole Formation	United Kingdom		A member of the family Solanaceae; a new genus for "Solanum" arnense Chandler (1962).	
Hyoscyamosperma	Gen. et 2 sp. nov		Deanna & Smith in Deanna et al.	Oligocene to Quaternary		Russia		A member of the family Solanaceae. The type species is H. daturoides; genus also includes H. undulatus.	
Seminuta	Gen. et sp. nov		Deanna & Smith in Deanna et al.	Pliocene to Pleistocene		Italy		A member of the family Solanaceae. The type species is S. pliocenica.	
Sinuatitesta	Gen. et comb. nov		Deanna & Knapp in Deanna et al.	Oligocene to Pleistocene		Ukraine		A member of the family Solanaceae; a new genus for "Solanum" foveolatum Negru (1986).	
Solanotes	Gen. et sp. nov		Deanna & Smith in Deanna et al.	Oligocene to Pleistocene		Russia		A member of the family Solanaceae. The type species is S. dorofeevii.	
Solanum miocenicum	Sp. nov		Deanna & Smith in Deanna et al.	Oligocene to Pleistocene		Russia		A species of Solanum.	
Thanatosperma	Gen. et sp. nov		Deanna & Knapp in Deanna et al.	Pliocene to Holocene		Germany		A member of the family Solanaceae. The type species is T. minutum.	

==== Superasterid research ====
- Lu et al. (2026) study the fossil material of Nyssa sibirica from the Pliocene strata from the Yuxi Basin (Yunnan, China) and reconstruct the geographic distribution of tupelos throughout their evolutionary history, interpreting the species belonging to this genus as originating in warm and humid environments, with their distribution contracting as a result of climate cooling during the Neogene.
- A fossil seed with closest morphological similarity to Carpodetus, representing the first probable macrofossil record of Rousseaceae, is described from the Oligocene Pomahaka Formation (New Zealand) by Conran & Richards (2026).
- González-Ramírez, Deanna & Smith (2026) reconstruct the evolutionary history of Solanaceae on the basis of data from extant and fossil taxa, reporting evidence of Late Cretaceous origin of the group.

=== Superrosids ===
==== Fabales ====
Name	Novelty	Status	Authors	Age	Unit	Location	Synonymized taxa	Notes	Images
Adinobotrys kathgodamensis	Sp. nov	Valid	Saxena, Doweld & Prasad	Miocene		India		Announced (under the name "Millettia kathgodamensis") by Prasad, Ghosh & Tripathi (2004); validated in 2026.	
Derris prakashii	Sp. nov	Valid	Saxena, Doweld & Prasad	Miocene		India		Announced by Prasad, Ghosh & Tripathi (2004); validated in 2026.	
Entada awasthii	Sp. nov	Valid	Saxena, Doweld & Prasad	Miocene	Chor Khola Formation	Nepal		Leaf fossil originally described under the name "Entada palaeoscandens" by Awasthi & Prasad (1990).	
Entada miophaseoloides	Sp. nov	Valid	Saxena, Doweld & Prasad	Miocene	Surai Khola Formation	Nepal		Seeds originally described under the name "Entada palaeoscandens" by Awasthi & Prasad (1990).	
Leguminocarpum elongatum	Sp. nov		Chandra, Shukla & Shukla in Chandra et al.	Paleocene-Eocene	Palana Formation	India		A member of the family Fabaceae.	
Leguminocarpum falcatum	Sp. nov		Chandra, Shukla & Shukla in Chandra et al.	Paleocene-Eocene	Palana Formation	India		A member of the family Fabaceae.	
Leguminocarpum semilunatum	Sp. nov		Chandra, Shukla & Shukla in Chandra et al.	Paleocene-Eocene	Palana Formation	India		A member of the family Fabaceae.	
Pahudioxylon pakistanicum	Sp. nov		Izhar, Su & Oskolski in Izhar et al.	Miocene	Kamlial Formation	Pakistan		A member of the family Fabaceae belonging to the subfamily Detarioideae.	
Parvileguminophyllum deperdita	Comb. nov	Valid	(Saporta)	Oligocene and Miocene		France		Moved from Mimosa deperdita Saporta (1861)	
Parvileguminophyllum norica	Comb. nov	Valid	(Unger)	Eocene and Oligocene		Slovenia		Moved from Caesalpinia norica Unger (1850).	
Parvileguminophyllum oblita	Comb. nov	Valid	(Saporta)	Oligocene		France		Moved from Acacia oblita Saporta (1889)	
Simojoflorum	Gen. et sp. nov		Hernández-Damián et al.	Miocene	La Quinta Formation (Mexican amber)	Mexico		A member of the family Fabaceae belonging to the tribe Mimoseae. The type species is S. mijangosii.	
Spatholobus zhurongii	Sp. nov		Zhao & Xie in Zhao et al.	Miocene	Bangmai Formation	China		A species of Spatholobus.	

==== Fagales ====
Name	Novelty	Status	Authors	Age	Unit	Location	Synonymized taxa	Notes	Images
Hexagonokaryon	Gen. et sp. nov	Valid	Manchester et al.	Paleocene		United States (Wyoming)		A member of the family Fagaceae. Genus includes new species H. nixonii. Published online in 2025; the final version of the article naming it was published in 2026.	
Quercus bernardii	Sp. nov	Valid	Denk, van Zuijlen & Krings	Miocene		France		An oak.	
Quercus liensis	Sp. nov		Thongsangtum, Huang & Su & Thongsangtum et al.	Oligocene–Miocene	Li Formation	Thailand		An oak.	
Zodicarya	Gen. et comb. nov	Valid	Deng, Collinson & Manchester in Deng et al.	Paleocene and Eocene	London Clay	United Kingdom		A member of the family Juglandaceae. The type species is "Juglandicarya" cantia Reid & Chandler (1933); genus also includes "Juglandicarya" simplicarpa Manchester (1987) from the Fort Union Formation (Wyoming, United States).	

==== Malpighiales ====
Name	Novelty	Status	Authors	Age	Unit	Location	Synonymized taxa	Notes	Images
Antidesma prasadii	Sp. nov	Valid	Saxena, Doweld & Prasad	Miocene	Churia Formation	Nepal		Announced (under the name "Antidesma miocenicum") by Prasad & Dwivedi (2007); validated in 2026.	
Antidesma sarkaghatense	Sp. nov	Valid	Saxena, Doweld & Prasad	Miocene		India		Announced (under the name "Antidesma miocenicum") by Tiwari et al. (2022); validated in 2026.	
Eogarcinia	Gen. et sp. nov	Valid	Ali, Almeida & Khan in Ali et al.	Eocene		India		Fossil flowers with affinities with Garcinia. Genus includes new species E. longistaminata. Published online in 2025; the final version of the article naming it was published in 2026.	
Parasalicaceoxylon	Gen. et sp. nov		Hung & Oskolski in Hung et al.	Eocene	Na Duong Formation	Vietnam		A member of the family Salicaceae. The type species is P. naduongensis.	
Rhizophoreaefolium	Gen. et sp. nov		Carpenter et al.	Eocene		Australia		A member of the family Rhizophoraceae. Genus includes new species R. pirukwimukati.	
Salicoxylon meridionale	Sp. nov		Pujana et al.	Oligocene–Miocene	Río Guillermo Formation	Argentina		Fossil wood of a member of the family Salicaceae.	
Scolopia himachalensis	Sp. nov	Valid	Saxena, Doweld & Prasad	Miocene		India		Announced by Prasad et al. (2025); validated in 2026.	
Tetrapterys miocenica	Comb. nov	Valid	(Berry)	Miocene		Venezuela		A species of Tetrapterys; moved from Gyrocarpus miocenica Berry (1937).	

==== Malvales ====
Name	Novelty	Status	Authors	Age	Unit	Location	Synonymized taxa	Notes	Images
Ayenia zhangpuensis	Sp. nov		Wu et al.	Miocene	Zhangpu amber	China			
Dryobalanops rajangensis	Sp. nov		Othman et al.	Miocene	Merit-Pila Formation	Malaysia		A species of Dryobalanops.	
Lueheopsis ansanis	Sp. nov	Valid	Lott & Manchester	Eocene	Green River Formation	United States (Utah)			
Malvaciphyllum checuorum	Sp. nov	Valid	Puente-Santos & Carvalho in Puente-Santos, Carvalho & Herrera	Paleocene	Bogotá Formation	Colombia		A member of the family Malvaceae.	
Pachira kathgodamica	Sp. nov	Valid	Saxena, Doweld & Prasad	Miocene		India		Announced (under the name "Pachira palaeomalabarica") by Prasad, Ghosh & Tripathi (2004); validated in 2026.	
Tilia pentagona	Sp. nov		Chen, Jia & Xing in Chen et al.	Miocene	Duho Formation	South Korea		A species of Tilia.	
Tilia perpendicularis	Sp. nov		Chen et al.	Miocene	Duho Formation	South Korea		A species of Tilia.	
Umarsaria	Gen. et sp. nov	Valid	Singh et al.	Eocene	Umarsar lignite	India		A flower of malvaceous affinity. Genus includes new species U. asahnii.	

==== Myrtales ====
Name	Novelty	Status	Authors	Age	Unit	Location	Synonymized taxa	Notes	Images
Capella	Gen. et sp. nov	Valid	Rozefelds et al.	Oligocene		Australia		A member of Melastomataceae. Genus includes new species C. raulingsii.	
Lagerstroemia himachalensis	Sp. nov	Valid	Saxena, Doweld & Prasad	Miocene		India		Announced by Prasad, Singh & Singh (2025); validated in 2026.	
Lagerstroemia jamraniensis	Sp. nov	Valid	Saxena, Doweld & Prasad	Miocene		India		Announced by Prasad, Ghosh & Tripathi (2004); validated in 2026.	
Syzygium miocenicum	Sp. nov	Valid	Saxena, Doweld & Prasad	Miocene		India		Announced by Prasad & Prakash (1984); validated in 2026.	
Syzygium ovatum	Sp. nov		Gao & Su in Gao et al.	Paleocene	Liuqu Formation	China			
Syzygium paleosalicifolium	Sp. nov		Sadanand, Bhatia & Srivastava in Sadanand et al.	Miocene	Kasauli Formation	India		A species of Syzygium.	
Terminalia miopaniculata	Sp. nov	Valid	Saxena, Doweld & Prasad	Miocene		India		Announced by Prasad et al. (2025); validated in 2026.	
Trapa gokarnansis	Sp. nov		Khatri in Khatri et al.	Pleistocene		Nepal		A species of Trapa.	

==== Oxalidales ====
Name	Novelty	Status	Authors	Age	Unit	Location	Synonymized taxa	Notes	Images
Eucryphia nirihuaensis	Sp. nov	Valid	Passalia et al.	Miocene	Ñirihuau Formation	Argentina		A species of Eucryphia.	
Eucryphia paraglutinosa	Sp. nov	Valid	Passalia et al.	Miocene	Ñirihuau Formation	Argentina		A species of Eucryphia.	

==== Rosales ====
Name	Novelty	Status	Authors	Age	Unit	Location	Synonymized taxa	Notes	Images
Dryas nukabiraensis	Sp. nov	Valid	Narita & Oppata	Miocene	Tokachihoroka Formation	Japan			
Eriobotrya antiqua	Sp. nov		Xu & Huang in Xu et al.	Oligocene		China			
Ficus eodrupacea	Sp. nov	Valid	Saxena, Doweld & Prasad	Miocene		India		Announced (under the name "Ficus eomysorensis") by Tripathi, Pandey & Prasad (2002); validated in 2026.	
Ficus prasadii	Nom. nov	Valid	Doweld & Saxena in Saxena, Doweld & Prasad	Miocene		Nepal		A replacement name for Ficus nepalensis Prasad (1989).	
Ziziphus prasadii	Nom. nov	Valid	Doweld & Saxena in Saxena, Doweld & Prasad	Miocene		India		A replacement name for Ziziphus miocenica Prasad (1994).	
Ziziphus singhii	Nom. nov	Valid	Saxena & Doweld	Miocene	Dafla Formation	India		A replacement name for Ziziphus indica Singh & Prakash (1980).	

==== Sapindales ====
Name	Novelty	Status	Authors	Age	Unit	Location	Synonymized taxa	Notes	Images
Acer maguanense	Sp. nov		Li & Jia in Li et al.	Eocene	Huazhige Formation	China		A maple.	
Arytera miolitoralis	Sp. nov	Valid	Saxena, Doweld & Prasad	Miocene	Churia Group	Nepal		Announced by Prasad et al. (2019); validated in 2026.	
Arytera nepalensis	Sp. nov	Valid	Saxena, Doweld & Prasad	Miocene	Churia Group	Nepal		Announced by Prasad et al. (2019); validated in 2026.	
Atalantia prasadii	Nom. nov	Valid	Doweld & Saxena in Saxena, Doweld & Prasad	Miocene		Nepal		A replacement name for Atalantia miocenica Prasad (1994).	
Baravalosphaera	Gen. et sp. nov		Chen, Ersoy, Boura, Herrera & Del Rio in Ersoy et al.	Oligocene		France		A member of the family Anacardiaceae. Genus includes new species B. operculata.	
Canarium siwalicum	Sp. nov	Valid	Saxena, Doweld & Prasad	Miocene		India		Announced by Prasad, Singh & Singh (2025); validated in 2026.	
Koelreuteria cyrtinervis	Sp. nov		Xie & Jia in Xie et al.	Eocene	Huazhige Formation	China		A species of Koelreuteria.	
Koelreuteria luolongensis	Sp. nov		Chai & Su in Chai et al.	Eocene	Meiduo Formation	China			
Koelreuteria quasibipinnata	Sp. nov		Xie et al.	Miocene	Duho Formation	South Korea		A species of Koelreuteria.	
Koelreuteria truncatocarpa	Sp. nov		Xie et al.	Miocene	Duho Formation	South Korea		A species of Koelreuteria.	
Lepidopetalum miocenicum	Sp. nov	Valid	Saxena, Doweld & Prasad	Miocene		India		Announced (under the name "Cupania miocenica") by Prasad, Ghosh & Tripathi (2004); validated in 2026.	
Palaeochoerospondias	Gen. et comb. nov		Ersoy, Chen, Boura, Herrera & Del Rio in Ersoy et al.	Eocene and Oligocene		United Kingdom		A member of the family Anacardiaceae. Genus includes P. sheppeyensis (Reid & Chandler, 1933).	
Swietenia palaeomahagoni	Sp. nov	Valid	Saxena, Doweld & Prasad	Paleocene-Eocene	Palana Formation	India		Announced by Chandra et al. (2023); validated in 2026.	
Swintonia eocenica	Sp. nov		Ali & Khan in Ali et al.	Eocene	Palana Formation	India			
Uintacarpa	Gen. et sp. nov	Valid	Manchester, Judd & Tiffney	Eocene	Green River Formation	United States (Utah)		A Sapindalean fruit of uncertain affinity. Likely belonging to Simaroubaceae or Rutaceae. Genus includes new species U. alata. Announced online in 2025 the official version was published in 2026.	
Zanthoxylum guipingense	Sp. nov		Xu, Song & Jin in Xu et al.	Miocene	Erzitang Formation	China		A species of Zanthoxylum.	

==== Saxifragales ====
Name	Novelty	Status	Authors	Age	Unit	Location	Synonymized taxa	Notes	Images
Exbucklandia rachia	Sp. nov	Valid	Lott & Manchester	Eocene	Clarno Formation	United States (Oregon)			
Liquidambar mesoaltingiana	Sp. nov		Maslova, Zdravchev, Kodrul, Wang & Jin in Wu et al.	Miocene	Erzitang Formation	China			
Liquidambar prechinensis	Sp. nov		Maslova, Kodrul & Jin in Wu et al.	Miocene	Erzitang Formation	China			
Liquidambar tengxianensis	Sp. nov		Tekleva, N. Maslova, Kodrul & Jin in Wu et al.	Miocene	Erzitang Formation	China			
Trochodendroides cuneatum	Comb. nov	Valid	(Newberry)	Paleocene		United States (Montana)		A species of Trochodendroides; moved from Populus cuneata Newberry (1868).	
Trochodendroides flexuosa	Comb. nov	Valid	(Hollick)	Paleocene		United States (Alaska)		A species of Trochodendroides; moved from Populus flexuosa Hollick (1936).	
Trochodendroides genesevianum	Comb. nov	Valid	(Chandrasekharam)	Paleocene		Canada (Alberta)		A species of Trochodendroides; moved from Cercidiphyllum genesevianum Chandrasekharam (1974).	

==== Vitales ====
Name	Novelty	Status	Authors	Age	Unit	Location	Synonymized taxa	Notes	Images
Austrovideira barivierae	Sp. nov		Chen et al.	Oligocene	Quercy Phosphorites Formation	France		A member of the family Vitaceae.	
Leea himachalensis	Sp. nov	Valid	Prasad et al.	Miocene		India		A species of Leea.	
Vitis praerotundifolia	Sp. nov		Chen et al.	Eocene and Oligocene	Quercy Phosphorites Formation	France		A species of Vitis.	
Vitis quercyensis	Sp. nov		Chen et al.	Eocene	Quercy Phosphorites Formation	France		A species of Vitis.	

==== Zygophyllales ====
Name	Novelty	Status	Authors	Age	Unit	Location	Synonymized taxa	Notes	Images
Larreoxylon	Gen. et sp. nov		Franco et al.	Miocene	Mariño Formation	Argentina		A member of the family Zygophyllaceae belonging to the subfamily Larreoideae. Genus includes new species L. cuyensis.	

==== Superrosid research ====
- Velasco-Flores et al. (2026) report the discovery of stem fossils of Euphorbia canariensis from the Pleistocene (Chibanian) strata of the Diego Hernández Formation (Tenerife, Canary Islands, Spain), preserved in their original distribution as a result of volcanic eruption, and representing the first record of fossils attributed to this species.
- Shukla, Chandra & Shukla (2026) review the fossil record and evolutionary history of Phyllanthaceae.
- Lu et al. (2026) study the affinities of Albizia fossil leaflets from the Miocene strata from the Xiangyang Coal Mine (Yunnan, China), and interpret them as indicative of presence of ancestors of Albizia julibrissin in southwest China during or before the late Miocene.
- Zhang et al. (2026) report the discovery of fossil of members of the genus Podocarpium from the Eocene strata from southwestern China and from the Miocene strata from the Korean Peninsula, and interpret the distribution of members of this genus in the fossil record as indicative of their broader climatic tolerance by the Neogene.
- Krejčíř et al. (2026) describe silicified oak wood (most closely resembling members of the genus Trigonobalanus) from the Menilite Formation (Czech Republic) associated with termite coprolites and microscopic fungal structures, and interpret the studied wood as consistent with presence of evergreen broad–leaved forests during the Oligocene.
- Sobek et al. (2026) redescribe the type material of Fagus haidingeri.
- Ali et al. (2026) report the discovery of fossil material of cf. Backhousia sp. from the Eocene strata of the Palana Formation (India), representing the first fossil record a member of this genus outside Australia.
- Cai et al. (2026) describe fossil material of Ailanthus confucii representing the first macrofossil record of flowering plants from the Eocene strata of the Qaidam Basin in northeastern Tibetan Plateau (China), and reconstruct the dispersal of Ailanthus throughout its evolutionary history.
- Hazra & Khan (2026) identify fossil flowers of Sterculia villosa from the Pliocene strata from the Chota Nagpur Plateau (India).

=== Other eudicots ===
Name	Novelty	Status	Authors	Age	Unit	Location	Synonymized taxa	Notes	Images
Doliofolium	Gen. et sp. nov	Valid	Wilf, Giraldo & Carpenter in Wilf et al.	Eocene	Salt Creek Formation	Australia		A member of the family Dilleniaceae. The type species is D. cooksoniae.	
Vancouverocarpa	Gen. et sp. nov		Hodgson, Stockey & Rothwell	Eocene		Canada (British Columbia)		Eudicot fruits and seeds with closest morphological similarity to members of Sapindales. Genus includes new species V. idioblasta.	

=== Other angiosperms ===
Name	Novelty	Status	Authors	Age	Unit	Location	Synonymized taxa	Notes	Images
Antiquifloris pilosus	Sp. nov		Beurel, Bachelier, Schmidt, Schönenberger & Sadowski in Beurel et al.	Cretaceous (Albian-Cenomanian)	Kachin amber	Myanmar		An early flowering plant, possibly with affinities with Austrobaileyales.	
Antiquifloris subglaber	Sp. nov		Beurel, Bachelier, Schmidt, Schönenberger & Sadowski in Beurel et al.	Cretaceous (Albian-Cenomanian)	Kachin amber	Myanmar		An early flowering plant, possibly with affinities with Austrobaileyales.	
Eleionomea	Gen. et sp. nov		Kowalski & Błażejowski	Paleocene (Thanetian)		Poland		A member of the family Nymphaeaceae. Genus includes new species E. pomeranica.	
Jixia jiuquanensis	Sp. nov		Peng et al.	Early Cretaceous	Zhonggou Formation	China		A basal flowering plant.	
Kanalflorus	Gen. et sp. nov	Valid	Hernández-Damián et al.	Late Cretaceous (Campanian)	Angostura Formation	Mexico		A flowering plant of uncertain affinities, with a floral structure similar to those of eudicots, especially extant members of Apiales. Genus includes new species K. variabilis.	
Kangauzia	Gen. et sp. nov	Valid	Golovneva et al.	Early Cretaceous (Albian)	Frentsevka Formation	Russia (Primorsky Krai)		A herbaceous flowering plant. Genus includes new species K. ussuriensis.	
Kohlsia	Gen. et sp. nov	Valid	Manchester, Judd & Tiffney	Eocene	Green River Formation	United States (Colorado)		A herbaceous eudicot of uncertain affinities, possibly a superasterid. Genus includes new species K. parachutensis.	
Kuvshinia	Gen. et sp. nov	Valid	Golovneva et al.	Early Cretaceous (Albian)	Frentsevka Formation	Russia (Primorsky Krai)		A herbaceous flowering plant. Genus includes new species K. oleynikovii.	
Pentasepalous	Gen. et sp. nov		Ali & Khan in Ali et al.	Eocene	Palana Formation	India		A winged fruit. Genus includes new species P. gurhaensis.	
Quechu	Gen. et sp. nov		Siegert & Gandolfo	Eocene	Laguna del Hunco Formation	Argentina		A fossil fruit of uncertain affinities. Genus includes new species Q. fratersuus.	

=== General angiosperm research ===
- Evidence from the study of the fossil record and molecular clock analysis, interpreted as indicative of Late Jurassic origin of flowering plants, is presented by Wu et al. (2026).
- Evidence of early Albian age of the early angiosperm herbaceous assemblage from the Frentsevka Formation (Primorsky Krai, Russia) is presented by Golovneva et al. (2026).
- Lee et al. (2026) report the discovery of a diverse assemblage of fossil diaspores from the Campanian strata of the Jose Creek Formation (McRae Group; New Mexico, United States), interpreted as indicative of evolution of diverse dispersal strategies of flowering plants during the Cretaceous.
- Song et al. (2026) describe a flower of Tropidogyne cf. pentaptera from the Cretaceous amber from Myanmar preserved with four instead of five tepals, providing evidence of variability of floral organ number in mid-Cretaceous eudicots.
- Rull (2026) reconstructs the evolutionary history of mangroves from the tropical Atlantic coasts of Africa.
- A diverse assemblage of Eocene fruits and seeds is described from the Lillebælt Clay Formation (Denmark) by Nielsen, Collinson & Heilann-Clausen (2026).
- A new assemblage of fossil leaves, providing evidence of presence of evergreen to semi-evergreen vegetation dominated by members of Lauraceae in the Himalayan Foreland Basin during the late Miocene, is reported from the Siwalik sediments in Nepal by Poudel et al. (2026).
- Jolly-Saad & Bonnefille (2026) study the composition of the angiosperm wood assemblages from the Plio-Pleistocene Shungura Formation (Ethiopia), and report evidence of changes of composition of the studied flora interpreted as indicative of increased aridity through time.

== Other plants ==
Name	Novelty	Status	Authors	Age	Unit	Location	Synonymized taxa	Notes	Images
Decaturospermum	Gen. et comb. nov	Valid	Manchester & Crane	Late Cretaceous (Cenomanian)	Dakota Formation	United States (Nebraska)		A possible member of Gnetales; a new genus for "Laurus" macrocarpus Lesquereux (1868).	
Dengfengfructus	Gen. et sp. nov		Wang et al.	Permian	Lower Shihezi Formation	China		A fossil plant organ with similarities to flowering plant fruits. The type species is D. maxima.	
Dopyeria	Gen. et sp. nov	Valid	Gensel	Devonian (Emsian)		Canada (New Brunswick)		A basal euphyllophyte. Genus includes new species D. elongata.	
Ganiopteris	Gen. et sp. nov		Wang et al.	Carboniferous (Tournaisian)	Huashanling Formation	China		An early seed plant of uncertain affinities. The type species is G. phylla.	
Gnetopsis villosa	Sp. nov		Li & Xue in Li et al.	Carboniferous	Zhangshuwan Formation	China		A member of Lagenospermopsida of uncertain affinities.	
Hermanophyton knollii	Sp. nov		Decombeix & Krings	Late Cretaceous	Aachen Formation	Belgium		A putative gymnosperm.	
Ixostrobus bilobus	Sp. nov		Chen, Zhang & Wang in Chen et al.	Jurassic		China		Male cones of members of Czekanowskiales.	
Lesleya belledonnensis	Sp. nov		Delfosse-Allain et al.	Carboniferous	La Mure Basin	France		A gymnosperm of uncertain affinities.	
Neoparadoxa	Nom. nov	Valid	Deshmukh	Middle Jurassic (Callovian)	Jiulongshan Formation	China		A gymnosperm with several morphological features formerly restricted to angiosperms; a replacement name for Paradoxa Liu, Shen & Wang (2023).	
Panxia spinosa	Sp. nov		Shen, Xue & Feng in Shen et al.	Devonian	Haikou Formation	China		A member of Cladoxylopsida.	
Paracycas pectinatus	Comb. nov		(Berger)	Triassic–Jurassic transition		Germany		A cycad; moved from Cycadites pectinatus Berger (1832).	
Permocarpelloides	Gen. et sp. nov		Wang et al.	Permian (Asselian)	Shanxi/Shansi Formation	China		A fossil plant organ with similarities to carpels of flowering plants. The type species is P. shuozhouensis.	
Pseudotorellia yilongensis	Sp. nov		Dong et al.	Early Cretaceous	Huolinhe Formation	China		A ginkgophyte leaf.	
Rellimia piedboeufii	Comb. nov		(Kräusel & Weyland)	Devonian		Germany		A progymnosperm; moved from Protopteridium piedboeufii Kräusel & Weyland (1932).	
Rexsilvasperma	Gen. et sp. nov		Fraser et al.	Carboniferous (Viséan)		United Kingdom		A pteridosperm ovulate organ. Genus includes new species R. robertii.	
Shangyuania	Gen. et sp. nov		Liu & Tian in Liu et al.	Early Cretaceous	Yixian Formation	China		A member of the family Ephedraceae. The type species is S. gracilis.	
Tetraxylopteris xinjiangensis	Sp. nov		Jiang & Xu in Xu et al.	Devonian	Hujiersite Formation	China		A member of Aneurophytales.	
Tympania	Gen. et sp. nov		Gess, Prestianni & Capel	Devonian (Lochkovian)		South Africa		A rhyniophytoid with cooksonioid-type sporangia. Genus includes new species T. merrionii.	
Umkomasia fleurdelysia	Sp. nov		Anderson, Barboni & Rozefelds	Triassic (Ladinian–Carnian)	Santa Maria Formation	Brazil			
Vuvuzela	Gen. et sp. nov		Gess, Prestianni & Capel	Devonian (Lochkovian)		South Africa		A rhyniophytoid with cooksonioid-type sporangia. Genus includes new species V. enkulu.	
Yamanus	Gen. et sp. nov	Valid	Gomankov	Permian, possibly also Triassic		Mongolia		Fossil leaves of possible members of Cycadales. Genus includes new species Y. mongolicus.	

=== Other plant research ===
- Review of studies on the systematics and evolution of Cladoxylopsida from preceding years is published by Durieux, Meyer-Berthaud & Tomescu (2026).
- A study on the morphology of the stem apex of Medullosa stellata, interpreted as indicative of presence of a complex vascular system, as well as indicating that members of Medullosales differed in stem development from the majority of extant seed plants, is presented by Portailler & Luthardt (2026).
- New fossil material of Pinnagigantonoclea guizhouensis, providing evidence of its creeping habit, is described from the Permian Upper Shihhotse/Shangshihezi Formation (Henan, China) by Li et al. (2026).
- Pratt et al. (2026) synonymize Carboniferous taxa Cordaites grandifolius, Noeggerathia flabellata and Ginkgophyllum delvalii under the name Ginkgophytopsis flabellata.
- Enriquez et al. (2026) identify rimmed, subcircular structures in specimens of Glossopteris from the Permian Wilton Formation (Australia), sharing similarities with galls or traces of hole feedings by insects but interpreted as having different origin, and stress the necessity of study of factors other than general morphology for correct identification of insect damage in fossil plants.
- Jiang et al. (2026) interpret the morphology of Fengweioxylon sinense as consistent with the interpretation of the studied plant as an evergreen tree with a 3–5 year leaf retention period, growing in environment with warm summer conditions, and interpret the morphology of corystosperms as consistent with their placement as intermediate between gymnosperms and flowering plants.
- D'Rozario, Rößler & Yang (2026) describe ovules of members of Cardiocarpales from the Permian (Lopingian) strata of the Xuanwei Formation (Yunnan, China), preserved within the ground tissue of a Psaronius housuoensis and providing possible evidence of a close ecological relationship between the two plants.
- Nosova & Zavialova (2026) provide new information on the anatomy of seeds of Allicospermum angrenicum from the Middle Jurassic Angren Formation (Uzbekistan), including evidence of preservation of pollen interpreted as suggestive of cycadalean affinities of the studied plant.
- Jiang et al. (2026) use stomatal parameters and carbon isotope composition of cuticles of Ginkgoites and Czekanowskia from the Yanan Formation (China) to reconstruct CO_{2} concentrations, local temperature and elevation during the Aalenian, interpreted as consistent with the studied plants growing in a basin or low mountainous terrain with a warm, humid climate.
- Zhao, Huang & Cai (2026) identify pollen diagnostic of Erdtmanithecales associated with Pelretes vivificus and members of the genus Parallelothrips from the Cretaceous amber from Myanmar, indicative of pollination of Cretaceous Erdtmanithecales by both thrips and kateretid beetles.
- Zhao et al. (2026) report the discovery of kateretid and sap beetle specimens from the Cretaceous amber from Myanmar associated with dense aggregations of Eucommiidites pollen grains, interpreted as evidence of pollination of members of Erdtmanithecales by insects.

== Palynology ==
Name	Novelty	Status	Authors	Age	Unit	Location	Synonymized taxa	Notes	Images
Anapiculatisporites grossus	Sp. nov		Gutiérrez et al.	Permian		Namibia		A trilete spore.	
Antulsporites constrictus	Sp. nov		Ruffo Rey, Balarino & Gutiérrez	Middle Triassic	Cerro de Las Cabras Formation	Argentina		A bryophyte spore.	
Antulsporites incipiens	Sp. nov		Ruffo Rey, Balarino & Gutiérrez	Middle Triassic	Cerro de Las Cabras Formation	Argentina		A bryophyte spore.	
Antulsporites robustus	Sp. nov		Ruffo Rey, Balarino & Gutiérrez	Middle Triassic	Cerro de Las Cabras Formation	Argentina		A bryophyte spore.	
Bacutriletes reguralis	Sp. nov	Valid	Peng et al.	Triassic		China			
Echitriletes conicus	Sp. nov	Valid	Peng et al.	Triassic		China			
Erlansonisporites depauperatus	Sp. nov	Valid	Peng et al.	Triassic		China			
Erlansonisporites junggarensis	Sp. nov	Valid	Peng et al.	Triassic		China			
Flabellisporites sparsulus	Sp. nov	Valid	Peng et al.	Triassic		China			
Floricorbispora	Gen. et sp. nov	Valid	Peng et al.	Triassic		China		A spore. Genus includes new species F. zhoui.	
Henrisporites grandis	Sp. nov	Valid	Peng et al.	Triassic		China			
Henrisporites karamayensis	Sp. nov	Valid	Peng et al.	Triassic		China			
Henrisporites rarus	Sp. nov	Valid	Peng et al.	Triassic		China			
Horstisporites papillatus	Sp. nov	Valid	Peng et al.	Triassic		China			
Luntaispora granulatus	Sp. nov	Valid	Peng et al.	Triassic		China			
Narkisporites coacorvatus	Sp. nov	Valid	Peng et al.	Triassic		China			
Narkisporites junggarensis	Sp. nov	Valid	Peng et al.	Triassic		China			
Narkisporites sparsus	Sp. nov	Valid	Peng et al.	Triassic		China			
Ovalipollis namibiensis	Sp. nov		Gutiérrez et al.	Permian		Namibia		A bisaccate pollen grain.	
Striatriletes inflatus	Sp. nov	Valid	Peng et al.	Triassic		China			
Striatriletes junggarensis	Sp. nov	Valid	Peng et al.	Triassic		China			
Sverdrupollenites zavatierii	Sp. nov		Gutiérrez et al.	Permian		Namibia		A colpate pollen grain.	
Tarimispora radiorugosa	Sp. nov	Valid	Peng et al.	Triassic		China			
Trileites bullosus	Sp. nov	Valid	Peng et al.	Triassic		China			
Trypophobiacites	Gen. et sp. nov		De Benedetti in De Benedetti et al.	Late Cretaceous (Maastrichtian)	La Colonia Formation	Argentina		A non-pollen palynomorph of uncertain affinities, with similarities to modern green algae Coelastrum. Genus includes new species T. chubutensis.	
Tuberculatosporites tricaricoi	Sp. nov		Gutiérrez et al.	Permian		Namibia		A monolete spore.	

=== Palynological research ===
- Bek et al. (2026) report evidence of distribution of early cryptospores and trilete spores in Ordovician and Silurian temperate zones with average temperatures similar to those of present-day tropical belt, and interpret their fossil record as suggestive of similar physiological thermal tolerance in early and extant plants.
- Wellman et al. (2026) describe the Devonian spore assemblages from the Portilla and Candás formations (Spain), and interpret spores from the latter formation as indicative of presence of a flora dominated by arborescent archaeopteridaleans and aneurophytaleans.
- Cascales-Miñana et al. (2026) describe a new assemblage of Devonian spores from the Bolloncillos Formation (Spain), providing evidence of presence of Archaeopteris or a related progymnosperm in the studied area during the Frasnian.
- Gutiérrez et al. (2026) study the composition of the first palynological assemblage recovered from the Permian (probably Lopingian) strata of the upper member of the La Golondrina Formation (Argentina), providing evidence of presence of a forest dominated by members of Glossopteridales, with undergrowth including ferns, sphenophytes, lycophytes and bryophytes.
- Review of morphological diversity of exine of pollen of extant and fossil gnetophytes and their putative relatives is published by Tekleva (2026).
- Evidence from the study of the palynological record from the Jiyuan Basin in the southern part of the North China Plate, indicative of four distinct phases of terrestrial vegetation transition across the Carnian pluvial episode that were temporally linked with indicators of volcanic activity and were accompanied by climate changes, is presented by Zhang et al. (2026).
- Sajjadi Hezaveh & Hashemi-Yazdi (2026) publish two studies on the composition of the plant assemblages from the Triassic (Rhaetian) strata of the Qadir Member of the Nayband Formation (Iran) as indicated by the composition of assemblages of spores and pollen, interpreted as indicative of affinities of the studied flora with both floras from northern Gondwana and with ones from southern Laurasia.
- Vilas-Boas et al. (2026) study the composition of Late Triassic and Early Jurassic palynological assemblages from the Algarve and Lusitanian basins (Portugal), providing evidence of overall dominance of xerophytic plants across both basins, as well as evidence of links of studied assemblages with floras from the western Tethyan margin and North America, and report malformed sporomorphs interpreted as evidence of environmental impact of Central Atlantic magmatic province activity.
- Rosin et al. (2026) study the composition of the palynological assemblages from the Westbury, Lilstock and Redcar Mudstone formations in the Cheshire Basin (United Kingdom), recording changes of composition of vegetation in response to environmental changes during the latest Triassic and Early Jurassic.
- A study on spores and pollen grains from the Schandelah-1 core (Germany), providing evidence of increased occurrence of malformed pollen grains and shifts in the composition of the palynofloral assemblage indicative of ecological stress during the Toarcian hyperthermal event, is published by Galasso, Foster & van de Schootbrugge (2026).
- Yang et al. (2026) report evidence from multiproxy analyses (including the study of palynological assemblages) of continental succession from the Junggar Basin (China) indicative of a shift from fern groundcover to conifer canopy during the Jenkyns Event and of recovery of ferns after the event, as well as indicative of a more humid climate with reduced monsoon seasonality that reduced wildfire activity during the Jenkyns Event.
- Evidence from the study of palynological assemblages from the Qaidam Basin (China), indicative of vegetation changes during the Middle Jurassic linked to a shift from a humid to more arid climate that was related to reduced obliquity, is presented by Tang et al. (2026).
- El Atfy, Abu Hamad & Uhl (2026) study the composition of a diverse sporomorph assemblage from the Middle Jurassic strata of the Arda Formation (Jordan), providing evidence of presence of floras dominated by ferns and bennettitaleans during the Bathonian.
- Evidence from the study of palynological assemblages from the Upper Jurassic strata from the Binalud Mountains (Iran), indicative of increase in the abundance and diversity of warm-adapted cheirolepid conifers over time in response to a regional warming, is presented by Kalanat (2026).
- Hofmann et al. (2026) interpret Gemmatricolpites from the Lower Cretaceous Araripe Basin (Brazil) as likely to be pollen of representatives of an extinct lineage of Aquifoliales originating from northern Gondwana as subsequently reaching a cosmopolitan distribution until the Eocene.
- Buratti et al. (2026) study the composition of palynological assemblages from the Gorgo a Cerbara section (Barremian–Aptian transition; Italy), and report evidence of presence of pollen Afropollis cf. jardinus representing one of the earliest records of flowering plants in the Tethyan realm.
- Zhang et al. (2026) study the composition of palynological assemblages from the Jiufengshan Formation (Dayangshu Basin, China), and report evidence of increase of taxonomic richness of the flowering plants in the studied area during the Aptian.
- Carvalho et al. (2026) reconstruct the composition of Aptian assemblages of spore-producing plants from the south Atlantic margin and their responses to environmental changes at the time of the opening of the southern Atlantic Ocean on the basis of the study of palynological assemblages from eight Brazilian sedimentary basins.
- Evidence from the study of palynological assemblages from Codó and Itapecuru formations, indicative of changes of composition of plant assemblages in northeastern Brazil in response to climate and moisture variability during the late Aptian, is presented by Correia et al. (2026).
- Lorente (2026) calculates the biomass of Cenomanian conifers in the eastern North America and the amount of their dispersed pollen on the basis of the study of the fossil record from the Arlington Archosaur Section (Woodbine Group; Texas, United States) and comparisons with extant conifers.
- Evidence from the study of spores, pollen and microcharcoal abundances from Paleogene sediments from a hydrothermal vent crater in the North Atlantic Igneous Province on the Norwegian Margin and from other mid- and high latitude continental margins, indicative of rapid vegetation and soil disturbances in response to environmental changes at the onset of the Paleocene–Eocene thermal maximum resulting in widespread appearance of fern-dominated pioneer vegetation across mid- and high-latitude regions of the world, is presented by Nelissen et al. (2026).
- Raynaud et al. (2026) reconstruct the composition of the Eocene plant assemblage from the embrithopod-bearing Bultu-Zile site (Meryemdere Formation; Turkey) on the basis of the study of the freshwater-deposited palynoflora from the site, and interpreted as indicative of a swamp-freshwater environment.
- Evidence of affinities of the pollen taxon Spirosyncolpites spiralis with members of the genus Jacqueshuberia is provided by Romero, Zavada & Jaramillo (2026).
- Barreda et al. (2026) study the composition of the palynological assemblage from the Río Pichileufú locality (Huitrera Formation, Argentina), providing evidence of presence of a middle Eocene flora dominated by gymnosperms and Nothofagaceae, and including fossil pollen representing the oldest record of the crown group of Barnadesioideae reported to date.
- Caballero et al. (2026) reconstruct changes of vegetation in southern Chile from the late Eocene to the early Miocene on the basis of the study of pollen assemblages from the Magallanes-Austral Basin.
- Casas-Gallego, Gallardo-Madrigal & Barrón (2026) describe pollen assigned to Eucommiopsispollenites compactus from the As Pontes and Laracha basins (Spain), providing evidence of presence of members of the genus Myrsine in westernmost Eurasia by the early Oligocene, and revise the Eurasian fossil record of purported members of the genus Myrsine.
- Moseri et al. (2026) reconstruct changes of vegetation in southwestern South Africa during the Oligocene-Miocene transition on the basis of palynological record from the Elandsfontyn Formation.
- Evidence from the study of palynological assemblages from the Miocene El Chacay Formation (Argentina) indicative of increase in floral diversity during the early Burdigalian before the onset of the Middle Miocene Climatic Optimum is presented by Tapia et al. (2026).
- Pound et al. (2026) study the Miocene (Serravallian) palynoflora from the Kenslow Member of the Brassington Formation (United Kingdom), interpreted as fossil record of plant growing in an area with an oceanic type climate with more rainfall during the summer than the winter (but with no pronounced dry season), and report evidence of impact of seasonal changes of availability of moisture on the composition of the studied Miocene forest.
- Evidence from the study of the palynological assemblage from the Cessaniti site in southern Italy, indicative of presence of a taxonomically diverse and structurally complex mangrove forest during the Tortonian, is presented by Niccolini & Bertini (2026).
- Robledo et al. (2026) study the composition of the fossil leaf assemblage from the Pliocene-Pleistocene strata of the Ituzaingó Formation (Argentina), and interpret the studied flora as indicative of a subtropical climate and an environment including ponds or slow-moving rivers.
- Evidence from the study of pollen assemblages from cave hyena coprolites from the Biśnik Cave (Poland), indicative of overall open vegetation during the late Pleistocene with phases of expansion of shrubs and woodland patches, is presented by Niccolini et al. (2026).
- Rowe, Brand & Bird (2026) reconstruct vegetation dynamics in savannas in northern Australia during the Marine Isotope Stage 5 of the basis of pollen and spore evidence, indicative of expansion of non-eucalypt sclerophylls resulting in persistence of savannas in spite of climate favourable for monsoon-forests.
- Li et al. (2026) report evidence from the study of the palynological record from the East China Sea continental shelf spanning the past 71,000 years indicative of presence of a cool, dry temperate grassland biome during the lowstand intervals (including the Last Glacial Maximum), as well as evidence of presence of an open-forest landscape during the milder conditions of the Marine Isotope Stage 3, and interpret their findings as supporting the interpretation of the exposed East China Sea continental shelf as a habitat facilitating the initial dispersal of early modern humans into East Asia.
- Evidence from the study of pollen record from eastern Nanling Mountains, indicative of impact of climate changes (and, since the late Holocene, human activities) on the composition of vegetation in the studied area during the last 46,000 years, as well as of existence of cool and humid refugia in subtropical China during the Last Glacial Maximum, is presented by Quan et al. (2026).
- Morley et al. (2026) reconstruct the distribution of spruce, poplar and willow in northern Alaska (United States) during the last 20,000 years on the basis of pollen preserved in lake cores, reporting evidence of decline of spruce presence in the region between 16,000 and 11,000 years ago, its persistence in a single locality during this time interval and subsequent recovery.

== General research ==
- Hooper et al. (2026) reconstruct the evolution of spore characters among land plants and provide a revised timescale for land plant evolution, with a late Ordovician origin of the crown group of embryophytes and Silurian divergence of crown groups of bryophytes and tracheophytes.
- Cai et al. (2026) report evidence of a shift in organic carbon to total phosphorus ratios in marine siliciclastic strata from approximately 455 million years ago, interpreted as likely linked to the spread of early land plants during the Ordovician.
- Lu et al. (2026) review evidence of impact of successive phases of plant terrestrialization on global coal accumulation.
- Evidence from the study of extant and fossil plants interpreted as indicative of at least two independent origins of endodermis in vascular plants (in lycopsids and euphyllophytes) is presented by Yang et al. (2026).
- Cooper & Hetherington (2026) study the sporophytes of Aglaophyton majus, Rhynia gwynne-vaughanii, Trichopherophyton teuchansii and Asteroxylon mackiei from the Devonian Rhynie chert (United Kingdom), and find no evidence of presence of true phloem in early plants with xylem.
- Evidence of widespread presence of diterpenoid-rich surface resins in cuticles of coal-forming plants from the Devonian (Givetian) strata of the Haikou and Hujiersite formations (China) is presented by Song et al. (2026).
- The oldest amber reported to date, likely produced by non-seed plants but sharing chemical components comparable with coniferous ambers, is described from the Devonian (Givetian) strata of the Hujiersite Formation (Xinjiang, China) by Luo et al. (2026).
- Review of palaeobotanical, morphological and developmental evidence of the origin of seeds is published by Martínez & Quetglas (2026).
- Meyer-Berthaud, Young & Decombeix (2026) document a new assemblage of Devonian (Frasnian) plants from the Hervey Group (New South Wales, Australia), similar in composition to Frasnian plant assemblages from south China.
- Evidence from the study of Devonian megafossil plant localities from the Catskill Mountains in New York and Pennsylvania (United States), interpreted as indicative of mass extinction among plants during the Late Devonian mass extinction, is presented by Retallack & Guo (2026).
- A study on the affinities of early gymnospermous seeds and their evolutionary history from the late Devonian to the late Permian is published by Bateman, Spencer & Hilton (2026).
- A study on the composition of the Carboniferous (late Pennsylvanian) plant assemblage from the Scisti e Arenarie di Iano Formation (Italy), interpreted as indicative of humid conditions with episodic marine influence, is published by Foggetti et al. (2026).
- Santos et al. (2026) study the composition of the Permian plant assemblage from the Costela Mine locality (Pedra de Fogo Formation, Brazil) dominated by callipterid peltasperms, interpreted as indicative of biogeographic links with early Permian plant assemblages from Euramerica, and report evidence of plant-arthropod interactions and plant disease in fossils from the studied assemblage.
- A study on the fossil record of Permian plants from southwestern China, providing evidence of a vegetation turnover in southern Cathaysia during the Lopingian, is published by Ma et al. (2026).
- Negri & Toledo (2026) review evidence of mutualistic relationships between insects and gymnosperms before the emergence of flowering plants.
- A diverse assemblage of plant cuticles and spores, providing evidence of presence of conifers, members of Peltaspermales and lycophytes, is reported from the Permian (Kungurian) strata from the Gorl locality in the Athesian Volcanic District (Italy) by Delfosse-Allain et al. (2026).
- Jalfin et al. (2026) study changes of taxonomic diversity and community structure of the riparian forest known from fossil from the La Golondrina Formation (Argentina) during the Permian, reporting evidence of peak diversity in the Guadalupian and major ecological disruption near the Guadalupian–Lopingian transition.
- Frolov & Mashchuk (2026) review the phytogeography of Mesozoic plants, and support recognition of three floristic kingdoms.
- McLoughlin, Turner & Mays (2026) study physical defences against herbivory preserved in Triassic plants from Gondwana, and report evidence of modest defences that increased during the Triassic.
- A study on gymnosperm wood preserved as charcoal from the Madygen Formation (Kyrgyzstan), providing evidence of wildfire in the studied area near the Ladinian–Carnian transition, is published by Spiekermann et al. (2026).
- Review of the composition of the Late Triassic (Carnian) flora from the Cave del Predil/Raibl (Italy) is published by Slodownik, Branz & Kustatscher (2026).
- Fang et al. (2026) report evidence of acid rains coinciding with the Central Atlantic magmatic province volcanism during the Triassic-Jurassic transition, as well as evidence of critical destruction of plant biomass in terrestrial basins during the Triassic–Jurassic extinction that was likely linked to acid rains.
- A study on the composition of the plant assemblages from the Middle Jurassic Yanan Formation (China) and their ecology, providing evidence of presence of five distinct plant communities, is published by Li et al. (2026).
- Gou et al. (2026) reconstruct the structure of the canopy-forming tree assemblage from the gymnosperm-dominated Yiwu Jurassic Forest known from the Middle Jurassic strata of the Xishanyao Formation (Xinjiang, China), and report evidence of higher productivity of the studied forest compared to modern temperate conifer forests.
- Foster et al. (2026) provide estimates of height and mass of giant trees preserved as fossil logs from the Morrison Formation (western United States), and interpret the presence of these trees in western North America during the Late Jurassic as suggestive of long-term climatic cyclicity including both periods of arid conditions and periods of humid ones.
- Evidence from the study of fossil plants from the Lower Cretaceous Jinju Formation (South Korea), indicative of presence of a temperate intermontane savanna in the studied area during the Albian, is presented by Lee, Kim & Looy (2026).
- Vršanský et al. (2026) interpret the composition of fossil assemblages of dictyopteran insects from Russia and Australia as indicative of presence of high-latitude forests with tall tree canopies during the Cretaceous.
- A large mid-Cretaceous plant assemblage, including diverse flowering plants, is identified on the basis of specimens from the Kachin amber from Myanmar by Shi et al. (2026).
- A study on the composition of the Cenomanian plant assemblage from the strata of the Utrillas Group from the Algora area (Guadalajara, Spain) is published by Sender, Bueno-Cebollada & Pérez-García (2026).
- Salzmann et al. (2026) report evidence from the study of charcoal, lipid biomarkers and palynological assemblages from the Turonian-Santonian strata from West Antarctica interpreted as evidence of wildfires in the studied area during the Cretaceous, and linking changes of the fire regime to shift of local vegetation from Nyssapollenites-Taxodium swamp forest to the earliest Sphagnum-peat bog reported to date from southern high latitudes.
- A new, diverse plant assemblage, providing evidence of presence of a mixed angiosperm-conifer woodland ecosystem, is described from the Turonian–Coniacian strata of the Moreno Hill Formation (New Mexico, United States) by Cilliers et al. (2026).
- A study on the composition of the flora from the strata of the Horsethief Member of the Horseshoe Canyon Formation at Morrin Bridge (Alberta, Canada), interpreted as indicative of a warm, humid environment, is published by West et al. (2026).
- Evidence of turnovers of all land plant groups that were concentrated within brief episodes of extreme global warmth in the mid-Cretaceous and early Cenozoic is presented by Sniderman, Jordan & Mays (2026).
- Greenwood & Conran (2026) review the fossil record of Cenozoic plants from the Kati Thanda–Lake Eyre, Woomera and northern deserts region of South Australia.
- Crystal et al. (2026) report the discovery of a new earliest Paleocene flora in the Denver Basin (Colorado, United States), preserving fossil record of four forest floor horizons with variable abundance of the dominant taxa.
- Bondarenko & Utescher (2026) present a continental-scale reconstruction of zonal vegetation in Asia throughout the Eocene.
- Taxonomic revision of the Oligocene (Chattian) flora from the La Val fossil site (Spain) is published by Moreno-Domínguez et al. (2026).
- A study on the composition of the early Miocene plant assemblages known from leaf material from West Akrocheiras (Lesvos Petrified Forest, Greece) is published by Liapi et al. (2026).
- Lowe et al. (2026) determine the age of the Miocene Mascall flora (Oregon, United States), and reconstruct this plant assemblage as a closed-canopy forest dominated by floweing plants, growing in a warm, humid climate.
- Stiles et al. (2026) reconstruct climate changes and vegetation in the Upper Magdalena River Valley region (Colombia) during the middle and late Miocene, reporting evidence of surface cooling that exceeded global estimates, as well as evidence of presence of closed-canopy forests with increasing vegetation density.
- Schartman, Polissar & Strömberg (2026) reconstruct the development of savannas in northwest Africa during the Miocene, reporting evidence of development of a C_{3} grass-rich savanna during the middle Miocene, and its gradual replacement by the C_{4} savanna in the late Miocene.
- A study on the composition of the Miocene (Serravallian) plant assemblage from the Wolf clay pit in Graz-Andritz (Styrian Basin; Austria), interpreted as indicative of temperate climate without a pronounced dry period during the year, is published by Denk et al. (2026).
- Evidence of links between changes in westerly jet-induced rainfall seasonality and the migrations of C_{4} plants across eastern Asia throughout the last 7 million years is presented by Da et al. (2026).
- Wang et al. (2026) reconstruct the plant-insect interactions in the late Miocene Tatsumi-toge biota on the basis of the study of damage of fossil plants from the Ningyo-toge Formation (Japan) and comparisons with modern relatives of insects from the studied biota, reporting evidence of predominance of generalist insects that might have been linked to the late Miocene cooling and related environmental changes, and evidence of ecological stability of the Tatsumi-toge biota.
- Evidence of a significant decline of tree genus richness in Western and Central Europe after the Miocene, including regional losses of members of heat-tolerant lineages, is presented by Wilkens et al. (2026).
- Góis-Marques et al. (2026) describe lava tree moulds from the San Roque locality, representing the oldest plant fossils from Tenerife (Canary Islands) reported to date, and providing evidence of presence of a forest ecosystem on Tenerife during the Pliocene.
- A new, diverse assemblage of Plio-Pleistocene plants is described from the Kon Tum Formation (Vietnam) by Wang et al. (2026).
- Ecker et al. (2026) report evidence of environmental changes during the occupation of the Florisbad archaeological and paleontological site (South Africa) by early modern humans, including evidence of changes of composition of local plant assemblages.
- Evidence from the study of sedimentary ancient DNA, indicative of impact of topographic connectivity to refugia on plant community assembly in eastern Tibetan Plateau during the last 12,000 years, is presented by Li et al. (2026).
- Allaby et al. (2026) reconstruct the environment of the Southern River system in southern Doggerland on the basis of sedimentological and sedimentary ancient DNA, and report evidence of presence of temperate trees indicative of presence of northern refugia during the early Mesolithic.
- Liu et al. (2026) reconstruct changes of composition of plant communities in northeastern Siberia and Alaska throughout the last 24,000 years on the basis of sedimentary ancient DNA, and report evidence of increase of negative interactions such as competition between plant species that coincided with encroachment of woody plants into the studied communities.
- Evidence from the study of the fossil flora from the Quaternary tufas of the western Potiguar Basin (Brazil), indicative of a shift from a humid tropical environment supporting a mesophytic forest to the modern Caatinga biome, is presented by Aureliano et al. (2026).
- Góis-Marques, Madeira & Menezes de Sequeira (2026) identify Quaternary plant fossils from the Convento locality from Madeira in the historical collection of the former Museum of the Seminary of Funchal, providing possible evidence of presence of a Mediterranean-type vegetation in Madeira Archipelago.
- Kern et al. (2026) report that use of different vegetation reconstruction techniques results in significantly different estimates of absolute values in forest cover in Europe between 70,000 and 20,000 years ago.
- Evidence from the study of modern leaves from swamp and river margins, indicating that studies that use fossil leaves as paleoclimate proxy and do not take into account the reduction of size of leaves from the surface litter and buried litter might result in underestimation of precipitation, is presented by Brown et al. (2026).

== Deaths ==
- Eminent U.S. paleobotanist David Dilcher dies. Dilcher was a National Academy of Science member, twice a Guggenheim Fellow, and a past president of the Botanical Society of America.
