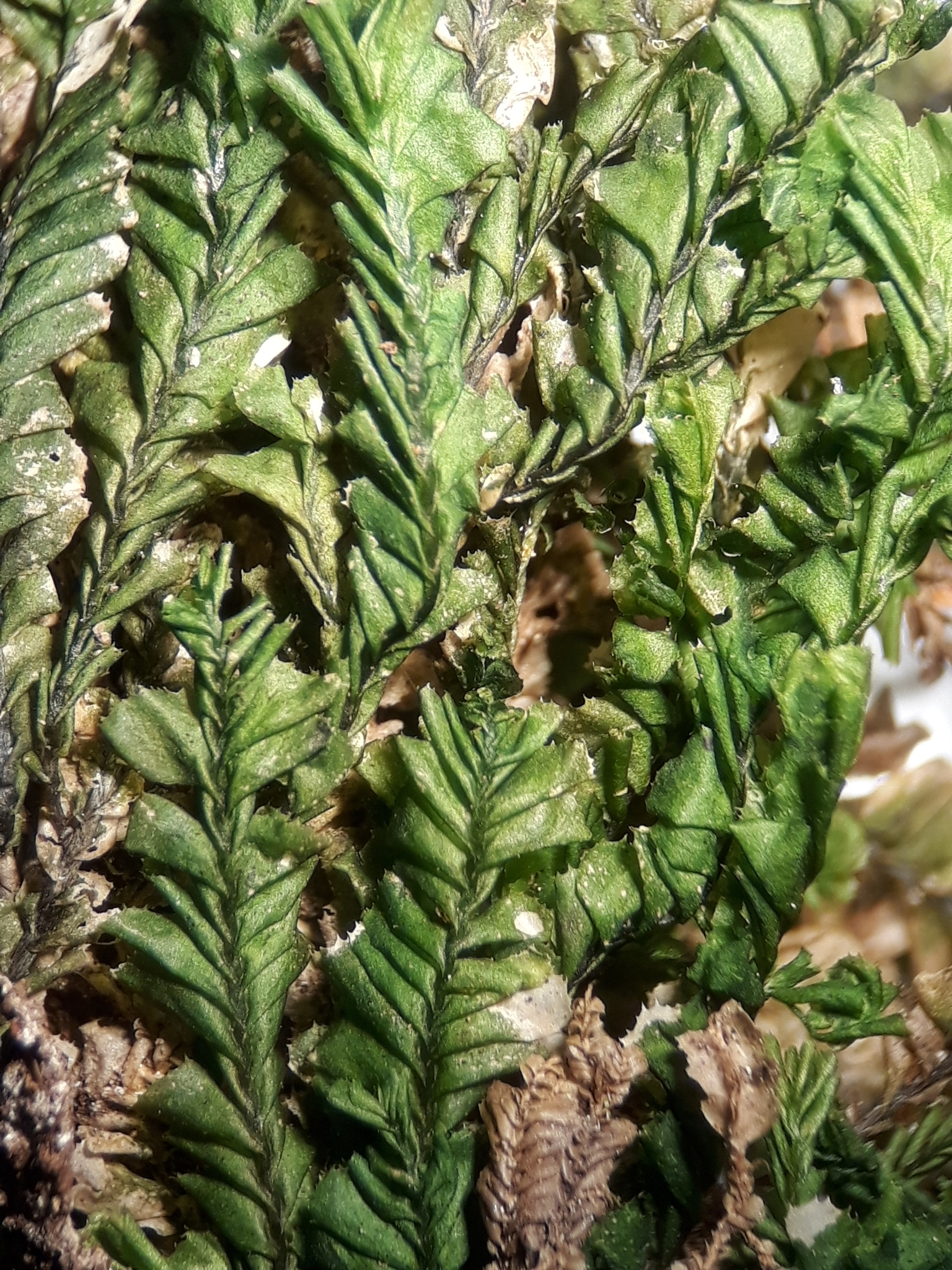

Scientific classification
- Kingdom: Plantae
- Division: Marchantiophyta
- Class: Jungermanniopsida
- Order: Lepidoziales
- Family: Plagiochilaceae
- Genus: Plagiochila
- Species: P. deltoidea

Binomial name
- Plagiochila deltoidea Lindenb.

= Plagiochila deltoidea =

Species of liverwort

Plagiochila deltoidea is a species of liverwort in the family Plagiochilaceae. It was first described by Lindenb. It is found in New Zealand and Tasmania. It resides on wet ground. It can grow to lengths of up to 60 mm with 3 mm wide leaves.
