= Plagiochila laetevirens =

Scientific classification
- Kingdom: Plantae
- Division: Marchantiophyta
- Class: Jungermanniopsida
- Order: Lepidoziales
- Family: Plagiochilaceae
- Genus: Plagiochila
- Species: P. laetevirens

Binomial name
- Plagiochila laetevirens Lindenb.

Species of liverwort

Plagiochila laetevirens is a species of liverwort belonging to the family Plagiochilaceae. It is common as an epiphyte in the dryland forests of Guyana.

A study in tropical Ecuador found that Plagiochila laetevirens was typically not found in urban environments despite being found in a nearby pristine location, suggesting that the species is sensitive to anthropogenic effects such as the presence of wastewater and heavy metal pollution.
