= Section (botany) =

Taxonomic rank in botany

The hierarchy of biological classification's eight major taxonomic ranks. Intermediate minor rankings are not shown.

In botany, a section (Latin: sectio) is a taxonomic rank below the genus, but above the species. The subgenus, if present, is higher than the section, and the rank of series, if present, is below the section. Sections may in turn be divided into subsections (Latin: subsectio).

Sections are typically used to help organise very large genera, which may have hundreds of species. A botanist wanting to distinguish groups of species may prefer to create a taxon at the rank of section or series to avoid making new combinations, i.e. many new binomial names for the species involved.

Examples:

- Lilium sectio Martagon Rchb. are the Turks' cap lilies
- Plagiochila aerea Taylor is the type species of Plagiochila sect. Bursatae

== See also ==
- Section (biology)
