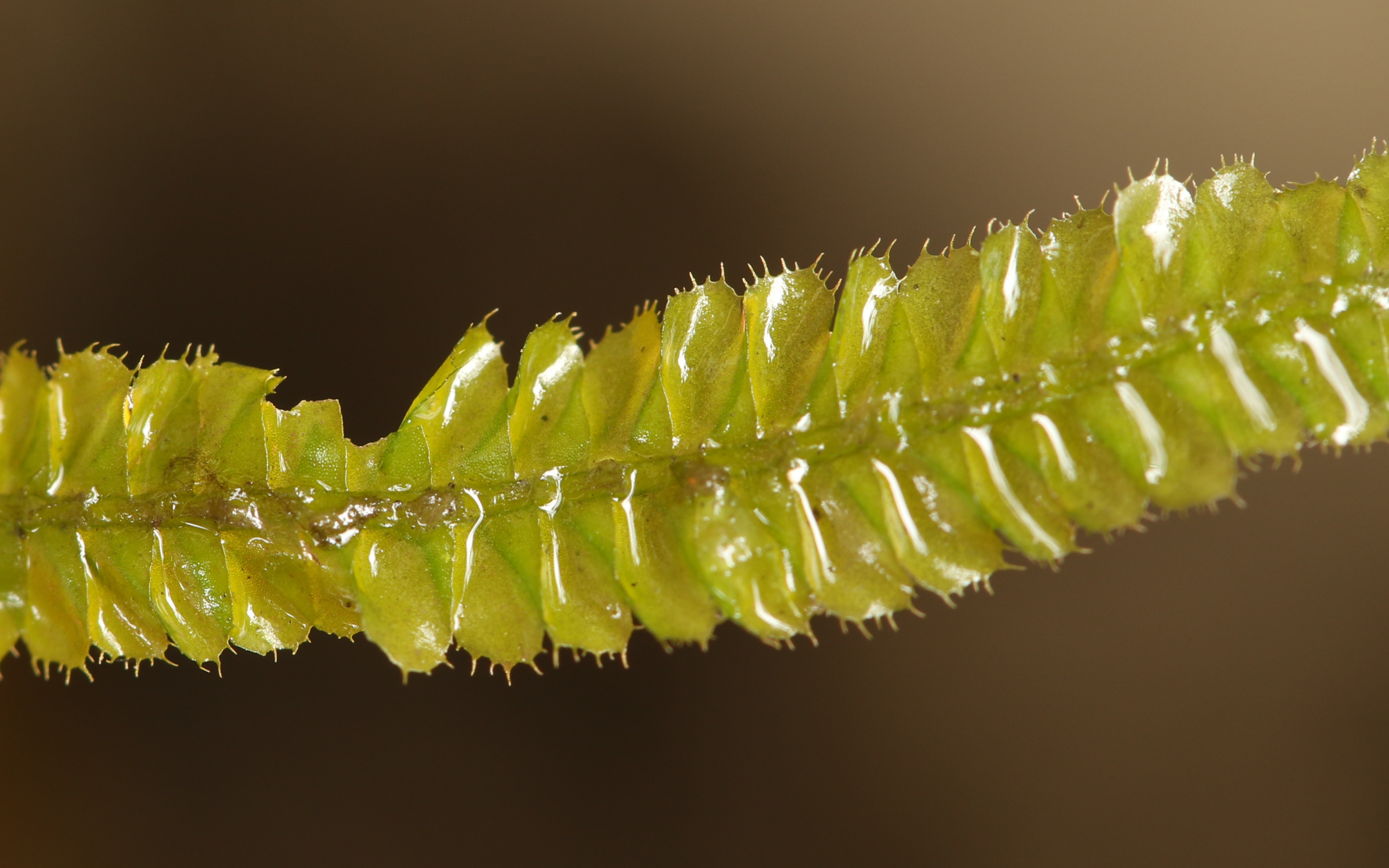

Scientific classification
- Kingdom: Plantae
- Division: Marchantiophyta
- Class: Jungermanniopsida
- Order: Lepidoziales
- Family: Plagiochilaceae
- Genus: Plagiochila
- Species: P. fasciculata

Binomial name
- Plagiochila fasciculata Lindenb.

= Plagiochila fasciculata =

Species of liverwort

Plagiochila fasciculata is a species of liverwort in the family Plagiochilaceae. Found in eastern Australia and New Zealand in moist sites.
