= Plagiochila wolframii =

Conservation status
- Critically Endangered (IUCN 2.3)

Scientific classification
- Kingdom: Plantae
- Division: Marchantiophyta
- Class: Jungermanniopsida
- Order: Lepidoziales
- Family: Plagiochilaceae
- Genus: Plagiochila
- Species: P. wolframii

Binomial name
- Plagiochila wolframii Inoue

Species of liverwort

Plagiochila wolframii is a species of liverwort plant in the family Plagiochilaceae. It is endemic to Peru. Its natural habitat is subtropical or tropical moist lowland forests. It is threatened by habitat loss.
