= Thallus =

Undifferentiated vegetative tissue of certain organisms

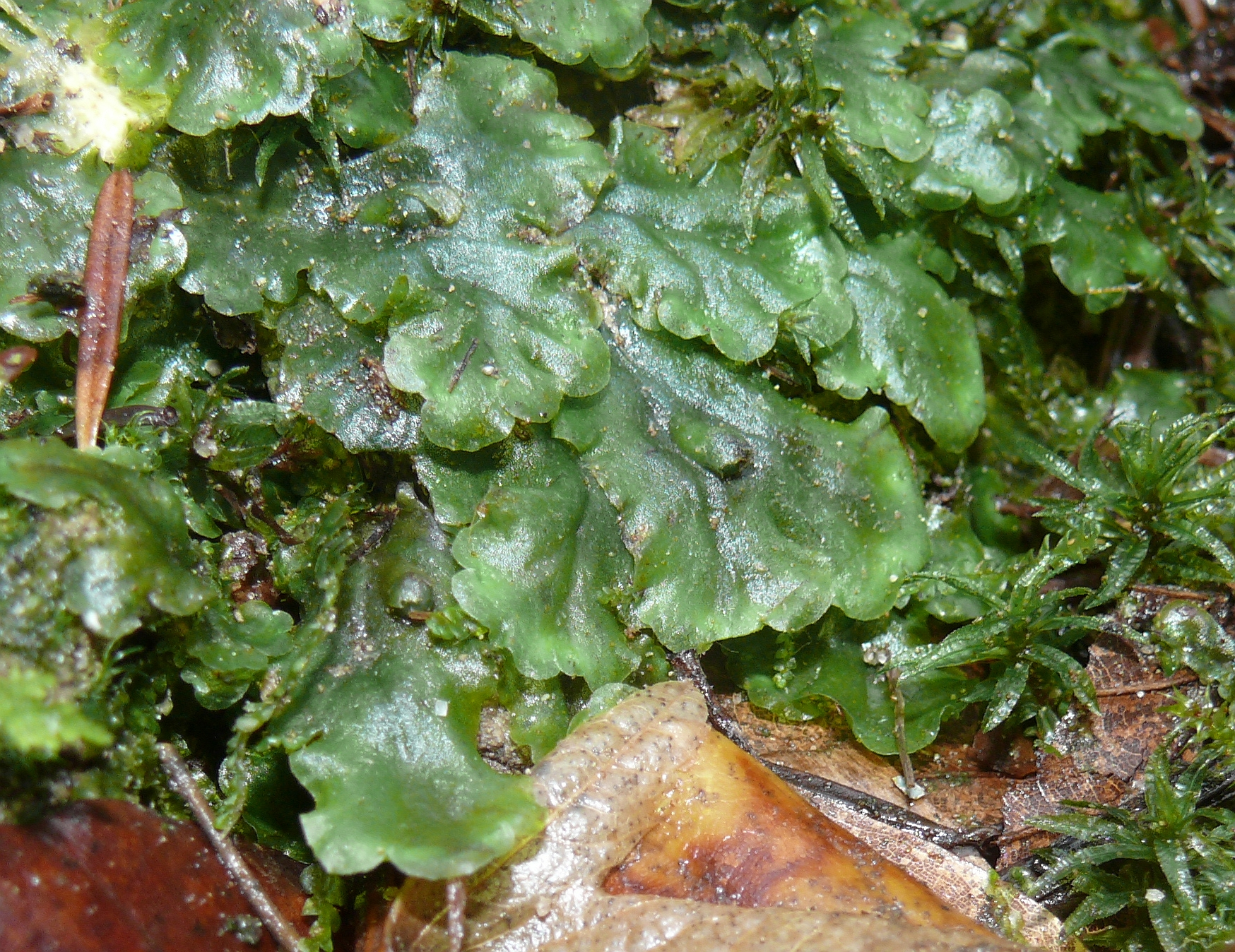
Thallus of Pellia epiphylla

Thallus (pl.: thalli), from Latinized Greek θαλλός (thallos), meaning "a green shoot" or "twig", is the vegetative tissue of some organisms in diverse groups such as algae, fungi, some liverworts, lichens, and the Myxogastria. A thallus usually names the entire body of a multicellular non-moving organism in which there is no organization of the tissues into organs. Many of these organisms were previously known as the thallophytes, a polyphyletic group of distantly related organisms. An organism or structure resembling a thallus is called thalloid, thalloidal, thalliform, thalline, or thallose.

Even though thalli do not have organized and distinct parts (leaves, roots, and stems) as do the vascular plants, they may have analogous structures that resemble their vascular "equivalents". The analogous structures have similar function or macroscopic structure, but different microscopic structure; for example, no thallus has vascular tissue. In exceptional cases such as the Lemnoideae, where the structure of a vascular plant is thallus-like, it is referred to as having a thalloid structure, or sometimes as a thalloid.

Although a thallus is largely undifferentiated in terms of its anatomy, there can be visible differences and functional differences. A kelp, for example, may have its thallus divided into three regions. The parts of a kelp thallus include the holdfast (anchor), stipe (supports the blades) and the blades (for photosynthesis).

The thallus of a fungus is usually called a mycelium. The term thallus is also commonly used to refer to the vegetative body of a lichen. In seaweed, thallus is sometimes also called 'frond'.

The gametophyte of some non-thallophyte plants – clubmosses, horsetails, and ferns is termed "prothallus".

== See also ==
- Homothallism
- Heterothallism
- Wengania
