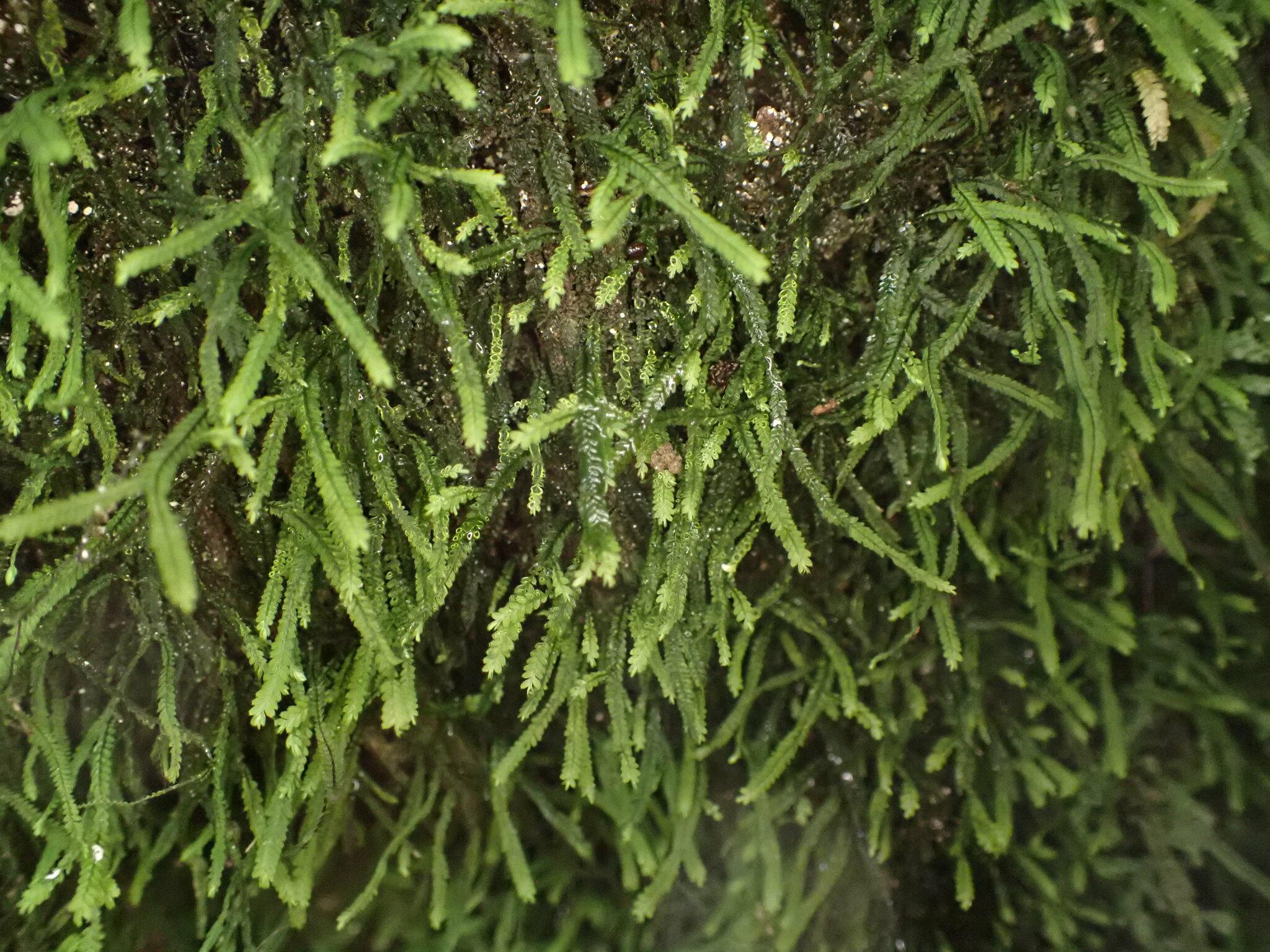
- Dickleria fruticella in New Zealand

Scientific classification
- Kingdom: Plantae
- Division: Marchantiophyta
- Class: Jungermanniopsida
- Order: Lepidoziales
- Family: Plagiochilaceae
- Genus: Dinckleria; Trevis. 1877

Species
- See text

= Dinckleria =

Genus of liverworts

Dinckleria is a small genus of liverworts in the order Jungermanniales, containing only three extant species. It is mainly distributed around Oceania. An Eocene-age fossil found in amber in Victoria, Australia, was described in 2026 as Dinckleria opaca.

== Species in Dinckleria ==
- Dinckleria fruticella (Hook.f. & Taylor) J.J.Engel & Heinrichs
- Dinckleria pleurata (Hook.f. & Taylor) Trevis.
- Dinckleria singularis (Schiffn.) M.A.M.Renner, Schäf.-Verw. & Heinrichs
