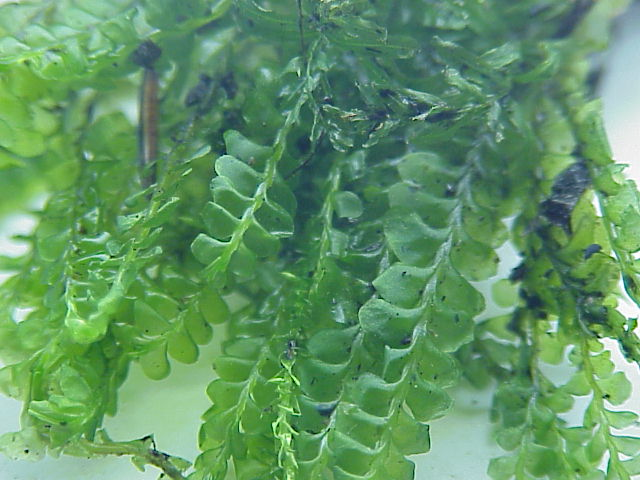
- Plagiochila asplenioides

Scientific classification
- Kingdom: Plantae
- Division: Marchantiophyta
- Class: Jungermanniopsida
- Order: Lepidoziales
- Family: Plagiochilaceae
- Genus: Plagiochila (Dumort.) Dumort., 1835 nom. cons.

Species
- See text

Synonyms
- Carpolepidium

= Plagiochila =

Genus of liverworts

Plagiochila is a large, common, and widespread genus of liverworts in the order Jungermanniales. It is a member of the family Plagiochilaceae within that order. There may be anywhere from 500 to 1,300 species, most of them from the tropics; the exact number is still under revision.

== Biogeography ==
The genus has a cosmopolitan distribution, found on every continent except Antarctica.

There are nine species of Plagiochila in Britain and Ireland, the majority of which have a hyper-oceanic biogeography, demanding high humidity afforded by proximity to the Atlantic. The most widespread representative of the hyper-oceanic species is Plagiochila spinulosa, a common species of Atlantic woodlands known as temperate rainforest. There is a disjunct population of Plagiochila spinulosa in New Zealand.

== Taxonomy ==
Plagiochila taxonomy is complex and disputed. Certain phylogenetic studies have shown that genetic distinctions between observed species are weak, suggesting recent diversification events. European species have been identified as conspecific or at least closely related to tropical American species, distinct from Asian species.

== Selected species ==
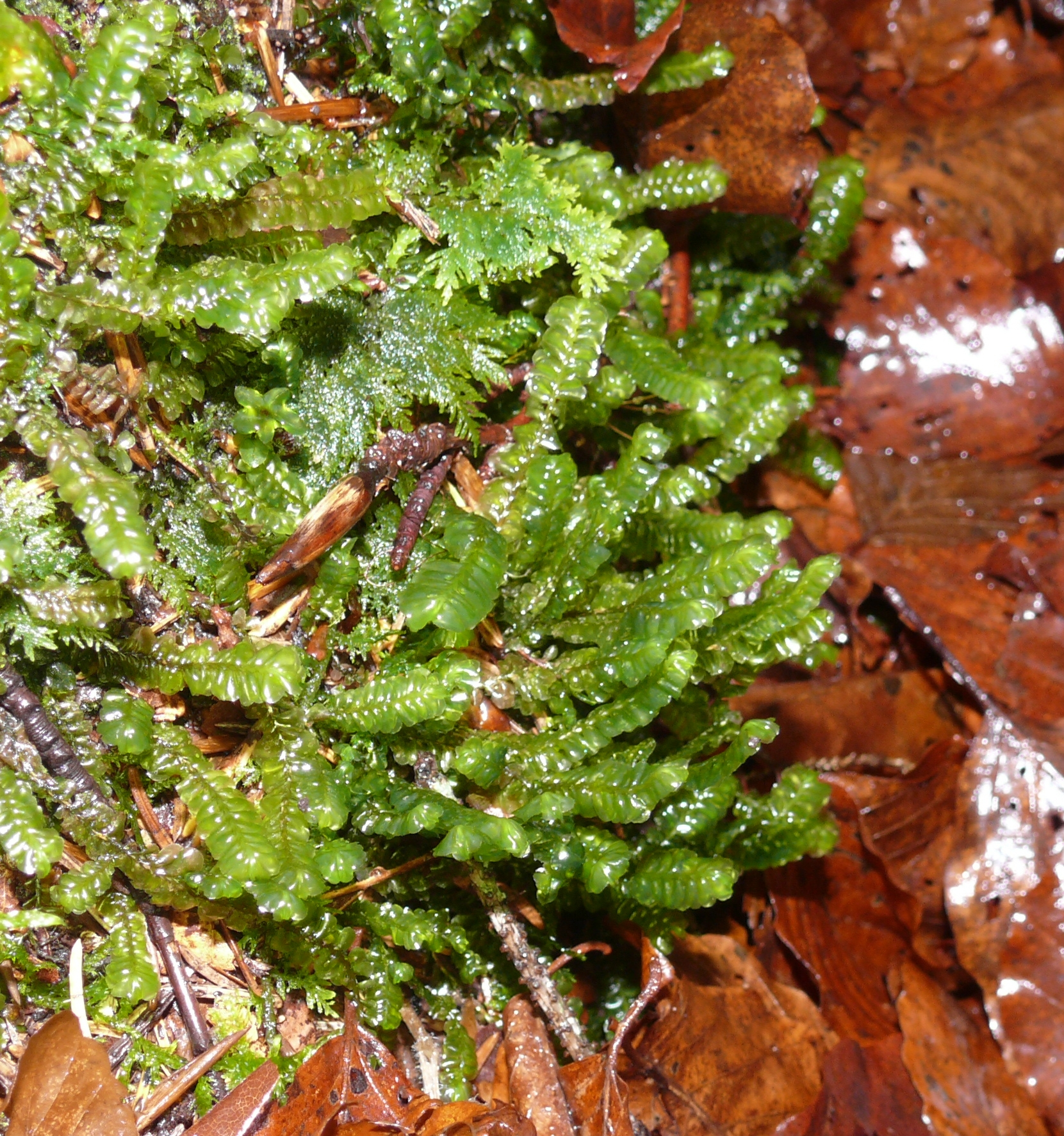
Plagiochila asplenioides

- Plagiochila amboynensis
- Plagiochila asplenioides
- Plagiochila belangeriana
- Plagiochila biondiana
- Plagiochila blepharophora
- Plagiochila capillaris
- Plagiochila chinensis
- Plagiochila corticola
- Plagiochila crassitexta
- Plagiochila delavayi
- Plagiochila deltoidea
- Plagiochila determii
- Plagiochila euryphyllon
- Plagiochila fasciculata
- Plagiochila firma
- Plagiochila flexuosa
- Plagiochila fordiana
- Plagiochila formosae
- Plagiochila frondescens
- Plagiochila fruticosa
- Plagiochila ghatiensis
- Plagiochila gollanii
- Plagiochila gregaria
- Plagiochila hakkodensis
- Plagiochila hamulispina
- Plagiochila handelii
- Plagiochila hokinensis
- Plagiochila japonica
- Plagiochila lacerata
- Plagiochila laetevirens
- Plagiochila magnifolia
- Plagiochila minor
- Plagiochila multipinnula
- Plagiochila nepalensis
- Plagiochila ovalifolia
- Plagiochila perserrata
- Plagiochila porelloides
- Plagiochila pseudofirma
- Plagiochila pulcherrima
- Plagiochila punctata
- Plagiochila recurvata
- Plagiochila rigidula
- Plagiochila robustissima
- Plagiochila saclpellifolia
- Plagiochila sawadae
- Plagiochila semidecurrens
- Plagiochila shanghaica
- Plagiochila shimizuana
- Plagiochila sikutzuisana
- Plagiochila spathulaefolia
- Plagiochila subacanthophylla
- Plagiochila tobagensis
- Plagiochila tongtschuana
- Plagiochila torquescens
- Plagiochila trabeculata
- Plagiochila vexans
- Plagiochila wallichiana
- Plagiochila wilsoniana
- Plagiochila wolframii
- Plagiochila yokogurensis
- Plagiochila yunnanensis
- Plagiochila yuwandakensis
- Plagiochila zonata
