= Caroline A. E. Strömberg =

Swedish-American paleobotanist

Caroline A. E. Strömberg is a Swedish-American paleontologist whose primary research focuses on the deep time evolution and ecology of plants through the use of the fossil record and by comparison with modern analogues, more specifically how previous plant communities changed in response to climate change and how plant evolution affected animal evolution. She is currently the Estella B. Leopold Professor of Biology and an adjunct associate professor in Earth and Space Sciences at the University of Washington and the Curator of Paleobotany at the affiliated Burke Museum of Natural History and Culture.

== Biography ==
Strömberg obtained her B.A. and M.S. degrees in Historical Geology and Palaeontology from Lund University (1991-1997). Her master's thesis was titled "The conodont genus Ctenognathodus in the Silurian of Gotland." She obtained her Ph.D. in Integrative Biology from the University of California at Berkeley with a dissertation titled "The origin and spread of grass-dominated ecosystems during the Tertiary of North America and how it relates to the evolution of hypsodonty in equids." She subsequently held postdoctoral positions at the Swedish Museum of Natural History (2004-2006) and the U.S. National Museum of Natural History (2007) before obtaining her current faculty and curatorial positions at the University of Washington in 2007.

== Academic contributions ==
Strömberg's research broadly focuses on the evolution of plant communities in deep time, with an emphasis on the evolution of grasses (Poaecae) and grassland ecosystems during the Cenozoic; the response of organisms to global climatic perturbations, including the evolution of plant communities across the Cretaceous-Paleogene boundary; and the role of silica in the evolution of plants. Her lab addresses these questions using both macrofossils and phytoliths and conducts research across a wide range of fossil deposits in North America, South America, Africa, and Eurasia. Her work has been published in leading academic scientific journals, including Science, Proceedings of the National Academy of Sciences, Nature Communications, New Phytologist, Annual Review of Earth and Planetary Sciences, Trends in Ecology & Evolution, Systematic Biology, Functional Ecology, and Palaeogeography, Palaeoclimatology, Palaeoecology and has received more than 5,500 citations. She has been an associate editor at Palaios since 2013 and maintains an active research lab at the University of Washington.

Strömberg has received extensive support for her research, including various scholarships in support of her education, including a Fulbright Scholarship, and numerous grants as the lead principal investigator (PI), a co-PI, or senior personnel from the National Science Foundation She has also received numerous institutional and society awards in recognition of her work, including the Alfred Sherwood Romer Prize of the Society of Vertebrate Paleontology (2004); the Isabel Cookson Award of the Botanical Society of America (2004); and the Charles Schuchert Award of the Paleontological Society (2017) and was a Distinguished Lecturer of the Paleontological Society (2017-2018).
