= Pachytheca =

Pachytheca Temporal range: Upper Silurian–Lower Devonian

Scientific classification
- Domain: Eukaryota
- Supergroup: Archaeplastida
- Clade: Viridiplantae
- Genus: †Pachytheca; Hook.f.

Ancient Plant's Fossil

Pachytheca are fossils of ancient plants, dating from the upper Silurian to the lower Devonian.
