= Wengania =

Wengania Temporal range: Doushantuou

Scientific classification
- Domain: Eukaryota
- Supergroup: Archaeplastida
- Division: Rhodophyta
- Total group: Florideophyceae
- Genus: †Wengania; Zhang, 1989

Species
- †W. globosa Zhang, 1989; †W. exquisita Zhang et al., 1998; †W. minuta Xiao, 2004

Extinct genus of algae

Wengania is a non-mineralized algal pseudoparenchymatous thallus stem group florideophyte under a millimeter in diameter.
