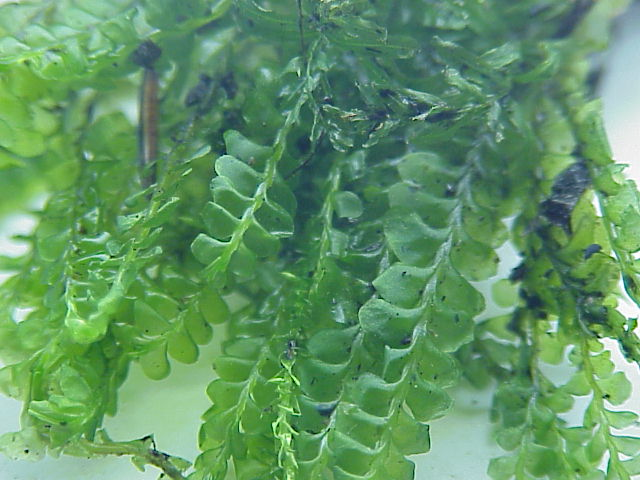
- Plagiochila aspleniodes

Scientific classification
- Kingdom: Plantae
- Division: Marchantiophyta
- Class: Jungermanniopsida
- Order: Lepidoziales
- Family: Plagiochilaceae (Jörg.) Müll.Frib. & Herzog, 1956

Genera
- Acrochila; Chiastocaulon; Dinckleria; Pedinophyllopsis; Pedinophyllum; Plagiochila; Plagiochilidium; Plagiochilion; Pseudolophocolea; Xenochila

= Plagiochilaceae =

Family of liverworts

Plagiochilaceae is a family of liverworts in the order Jungermanniales. There may be anywhere from 500 to 1300 species, most of them from the tropics, but the exact number is still under revision. The family also has a wide distribution in temperate and arctic areas.
