= Henryi =

Henryi, a new Latin adjective used for any of several naturalists named Henry, may refer to:

- Acer henryi, a species of maple found only in China
- Actinidia henryi, a species in the genus Actinidia
- Allium henryi, a species of plant in the family Amaryllidaceae native to China
- Alstonia henryi, synonym of Alstonia sebusii, a species of plant in the family Apocynaceae
- Androsace henryi, a species of plant in the genus Androsace
- Antrophyum henryi, a fern species in the genus Antrophyum
- Castanea henryi, a species of plant in the chestnut genus
- Calanthe henryi, a species of plant in the family Orchidaceae
- Chordeiles minor henryi, a recognized subspecies of the common nighthawk
- Clematis henryi, a species of plant in the genus Clematis
- Corymbia henryi, the large-leaved spotted gum (previously known as Eucalyptus henryi), found in eastern Australia
- Crataegus henryi, a synonym for Rataegus scabrifolia, a hawthorn from China
- Cyathea henryi, a species of tree fern native to India and China
- Cypripedium henryi, a species of orchid
- Elaeocarpus henryi, a synonym for Elaeocarpus sylvestris, the woodland elaeocarpus, a tree species in the genus Elaeocarpus
- Emmenopterys henryi, a species of flowering plant in the family Rubiaceae
- Glyphochloa henryi, a species of grass in the genus Glyphochloa
- Hemipilia henryi, an endangered species of plant in the family Orchidaceae native to the Hubei and Sichuan provinces of China
- Hemiscyllium henryi, a species of bamboo shark in the family Hemiscylliidae
- Illicium henryi, a flowering plant in the genus
- Iolaus henryi, a butterfly in the family Lycaenidae
- Iris henryi, a beardless rhizomatous iris native to China
- Isichthys henryi, a species of freshwater elephantfish in the family Mormyridae
- Koelreuteria henryi, a synonym for Koelreuteria elegans, more commonly known as flamegold or Taiwanese rain tree, a deciduous tree native to Taiwan
- Lilium henryi, sometimes called tiger lily or Henry's lily, a native lily of the mountains of central China
- Magnolia henryi, a plant in the family Magnoliaceae found in China, Laos, Myanmar, and Thailand
- Monachosorum henryi, a fern species in the genus Monachosorum
- Oecanthus henryi, a species of tree cricket in the genus Oecanthus
- Paragomphus henryi, or brook hooktail, a species of dragonfly in the family Gomphidae
- Passiflora henryi, a plant species in the passion flower genus Passiflora
- Pecteilis henryi, a species of flowering plant in the genus Pecteilis
- Pimpinella henryi, a species in the genus Pimpinella in the carrot family (Apiaceae)
- Pinus henryi, Henry's pine, a species of conifer in the family Pinaceae found only in China
- Reynoutria henryi, a synonym for Fallopia japonica, commonly known as Japanese knotweed, a large, herbaceous perennial plant of the family Polygonaceae, native to East Asia and considered an invasive species in other countries
- Rosa henryi, a rose species native to China
- Sageretia henryi, a woody shrub native to China
- Salvia henryi, or crimson sage, a herbaceous perennial native to northern Mexico and to Texas, New Mexico, and Nevada in the United States
- Saruma henryi, a flowering plant in the family Aristolochiaceae
- Satyrium henryi, a synonym for Satyrium nepalense, a species of Asian orchid
- Sindechites henryi, a species of flowering plant in the genus Sindechites (formerly classified in the genus Cleghornia)
- Sinobambusa henryi, a species of East Asian bamboo in the genus Sinobambusa (formerly classified in the genus Semiarundinaria)
- Sinojackia henryi, a species of flowering plant in the genus Sinojackia
- Sinowilsonia henryi, a plant in the family Hamamelidaceae endemic to China
- Vanda henryi, a synonym for Vanda denisoniana, a species of Asian orchid
- Youngia henryi, a species in the genus Youngia in the dandelion tribe within the sunflower family (Asteraceae)
