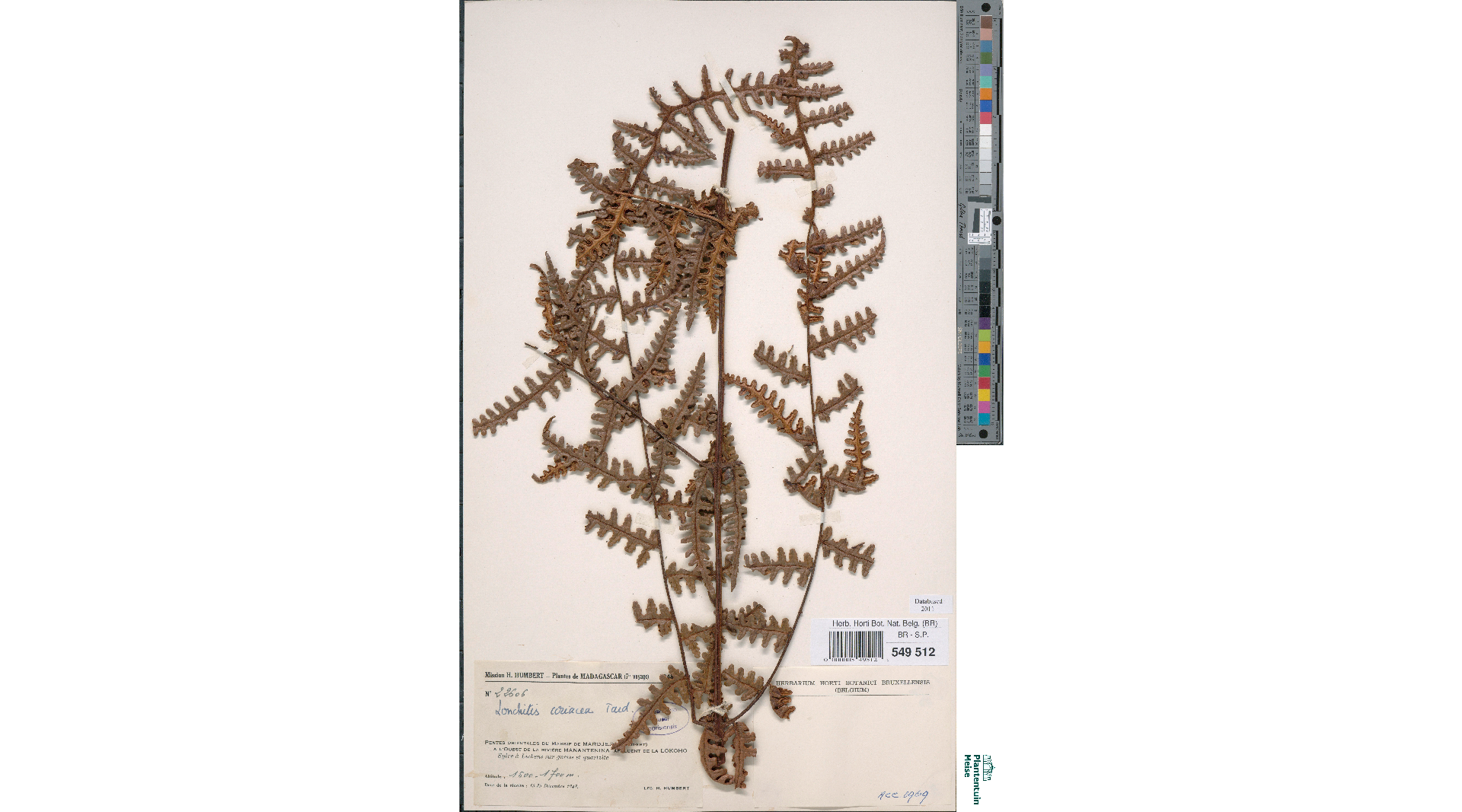
- Collected in Madagascar by Meise Botanic Garden December 1948

Conservation status
- Critically endangered, possibly extinct (IUCN 3.1)

Scientific classification
- Kingdom: Plantae
- Clade: Embryophytes
- Clade: Tracheophytes
- Division: Polypodiophyta
- Class: Polypodiopsida
- Order: Polypodiales
- Family: Dennstaedtiaceae
- Genus: Blotiella
- Species: B. coriacea

Binomial name
- Blotiella coriacea Verdc. (2000)

= Blotiella coriacea =

Species of fern

Blotiella coriacea is a fern located in the tropical forests of Tanzania. Like all Blotiella, it has pinnate leaves, specifically bipinnate. The plant stretches more than 70 cm high and is brown in color. The species has few noted observations and is likely confined to a small area.

== Origin of name ==
Blotiella coriacea was discovered in 2000 by Bernard Verdcourt in the tropics of East Africa. Verdcourt (1925–2011) was a biologist and taxonomist widely known for his work in the field of botany. Blotiella, a genus of ferns, was named in honor of Marie Laure Tardieu-Blot, a French pteridologist. Coriacea is from the Latin word coriaceous which means "leathery".

== Description ==
Blotiella coriacea has pinnate leaves.

== Structure and morphology ==
The basic parts of a fern usually include three major components- rhizome, fronds, and sporangia. The rhizome, which is the stem that produces roots and new fronds, of Blotiella coriacea is unknown. The fronds include the stipe and lamina. The stipe is unknown, but the lamina is bipinnate, a further subdivision of pinnate, meaning the leaves are twice divided, and the lamina is at least 70 cm long. The rachis, the central axis, has dense, dark brown hairs. The pinnules are narrowly triangular at about 2.5-6.5 cm long and 2–4 cm wide hastate at the base, stalked, coriaceous, or leathery, with a shiny surface. The pinnules have brown hairs on the midrib, and dark brown curved hairs are scattered on the surface beneath. The sorus, or groups of sporangia, is continuous but conceals by the revolute margins.

== Habitat ==
Blotiella coriacea can be found in the tropical forests of Tanzania where it is native, and it has also been found in Madagascar. There are three main types of natural forests found in Tanzania- Miombo woodlands, montane forests, and Mangroves while plantation forests are only artificial. Tanzania possesses over 30 million hectares of natural forests. The Tropical rainforests are small and usually found in isolated mountains. These rainforests are composed of high biodiversity and contain large numbers of endemic and rare taxa of both plants and animals. While most of these forests are reserves, they are still vital in providing water for the major cities and the densely populated rural areas. Humans have largely impacted the forests leaving them isolated and fragmented.

== Conservation ==
Blotiella coriacea is listed as critically endangered by the IUCN. The tropical rain forest in Tanzania Africa is under the Tropical Forestry Action Plan, set forth by the International Development Association. These forests in Africa have been affected mainly by extensive, destructive legal and illegal activities. These activities include logging, pit-sawing, and grazing. Research programs are also being conducted in Tanzania in an attempt to in improve future management and monitoring of the forest reserves.
