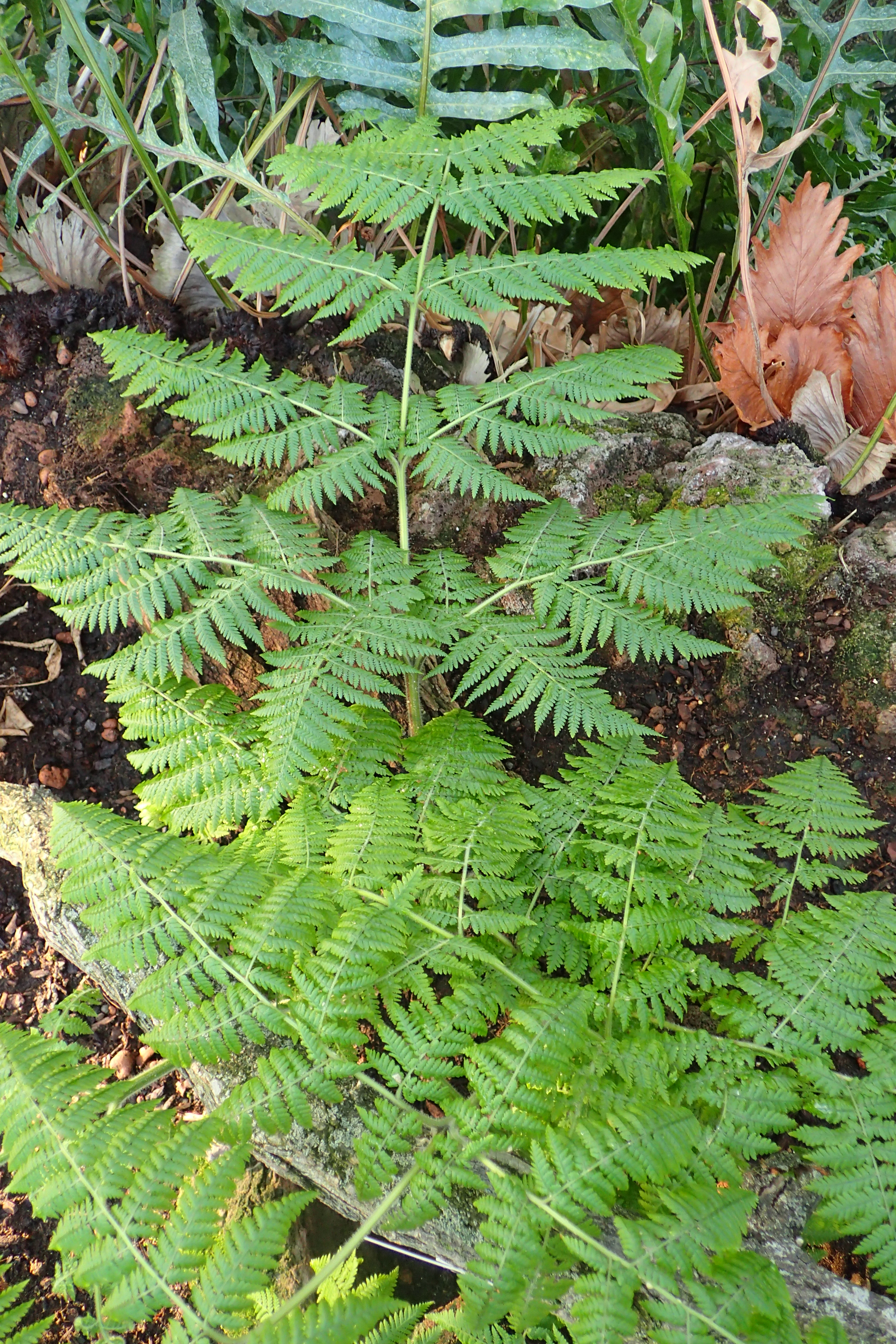

Scientific classification
- Kingdom: Plantae
- Clade: Tracheophytes
- Division: Polypodiophyta
- Class: Polypodiopsida
- Order: Polypodiales
- Family: Dennstaedtiaceae
- Genus: Hypolepis
- Species: H. punctata

Binomial name
- Hypolepis punctata (Thunb.) Mett.

Synonyms
- Dryopteris punctata (Thunb.ex Murray) C.Chr.; Hypolepis yunnanensis Ching; Nephrodium punctatum (Thunb.ex Murray) Diels; Phegopteris punctata (Thunb.ex Murray) Mett.; Polypodium punctatum Thunb.

= Hypolepis punctata =

Species of fern

Hypolepis punctata, synonym Polypodium punctatum, is a species of fern in the family Polypodiaceae. It is native to China and East Asia. It grows in marshy ground, wet sandy slopes in open areas and in lower montane forest.
