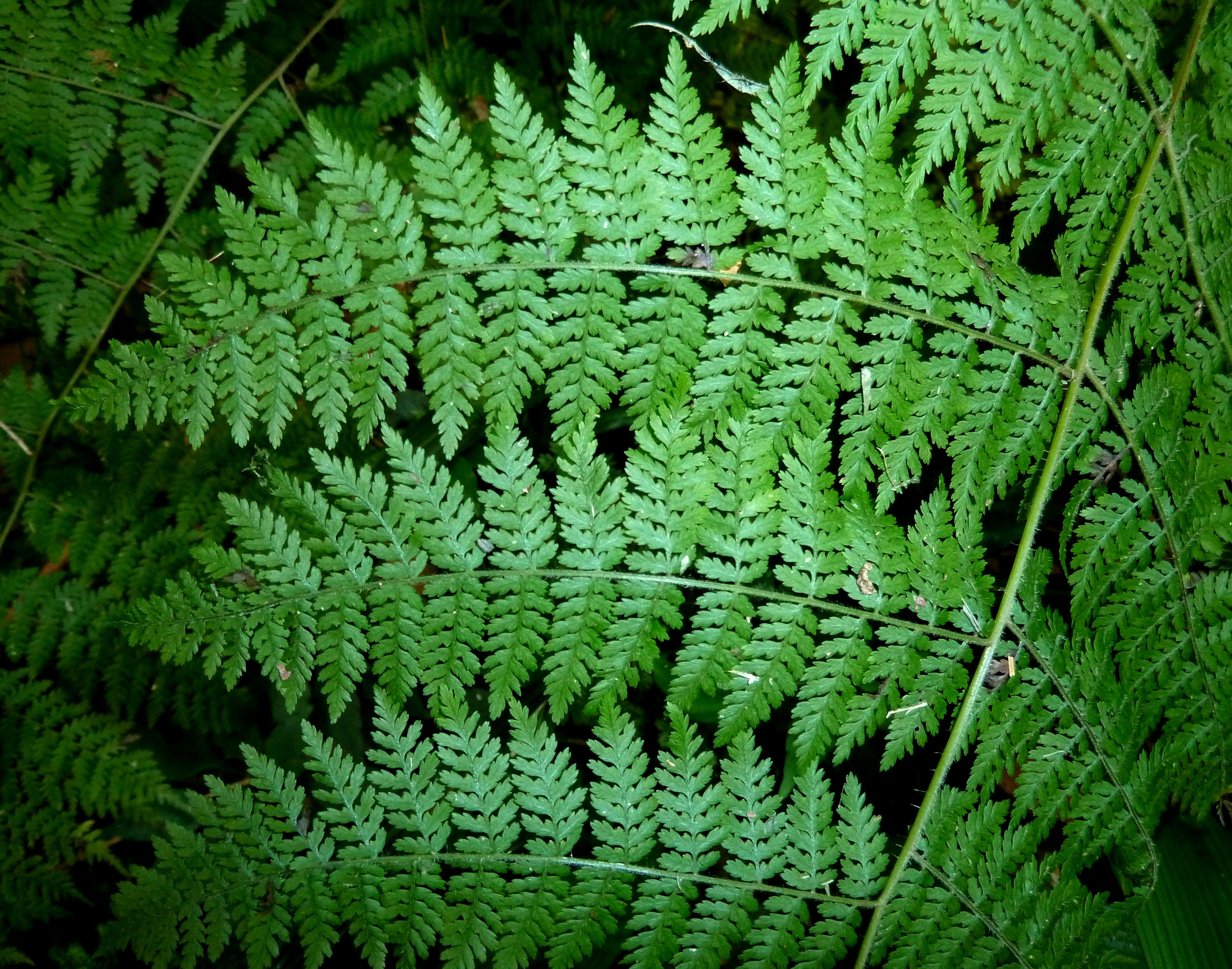

Scientific classification
- Kingdom: Plantae
- Clade: Tracheophytes
- Division: Polypodiophyta
- Class: Polypodiopsida
- Order: Polypodiales
- Family: Dennstaedtiaceae
- Genus: Hypolepis
- Species: H. sparsisora

Binomial name
- Hypolepis sparsisora (Schrad.) Kuhn

= Hypolepis sparsisora =

Giant edgelobed fern

Species of fern

Hypolepis sparsisora, the giant edgelobed fern, is an Afrotropical fern species with an extensive range in Africa and Madagascar, where it occurs at diverse elevations. In South Africa it is present in the Eastern Cape, KwaZulu-Natal, Limpopo, Mpumalanga and the Western Cape.

It has a subterranean, creeping rhizome of up to 9 mm in diameter. The erect fronds are widely spaced and finely divided. The ovate lamina is 1 × 0.8 m in size and 4- to 5-pinnatifid. The small (0.5–1 mm wide), oval sori are borne singly in the sinuses between the lobes.
