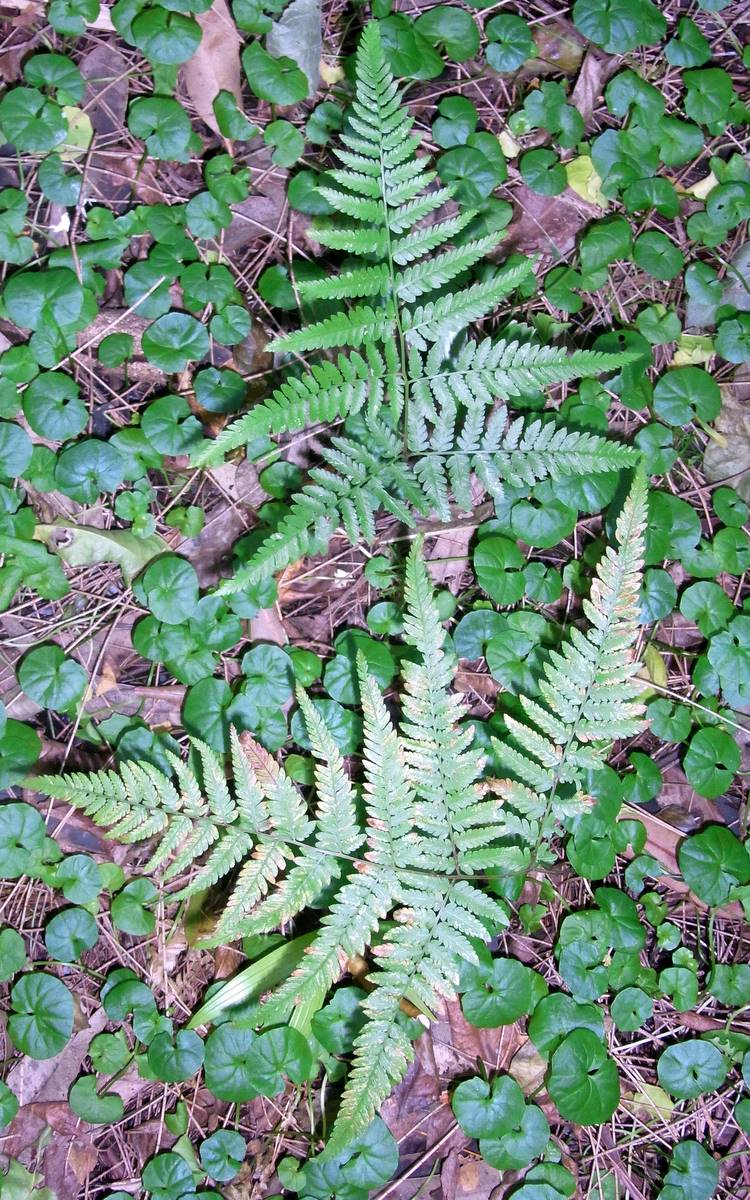
- Ground fern near Botany Bay, Australia

Scientific classification
- Kingdom: Plantae
- Clade: Tracheophytes
- Division: Polypodiophyta
- Class: Polypodiopsida
- Order: Polypodiales
- Family: Dennstaedtiaceae
- Genus: Hypolepis
- Species: H. muelleri

Binomial name
- Hypolepis muelleri N.A.Wakef.

= Hypolepis muelleri =

Harsh ground fern

Species of fern

Hypolepis muelleri known as the ground fern or harsh ground fern is a common small fern found in swampy areas and beside streams in eastern Australia. Usually seen between 30 and 100 cm tall with an erect habit. Despite the common name, the fronds are soft to touch. This plant was named in honour of the colonial botanist Ferdinand von Mueller. The original specimen was collected from Alfred National Park in 1941.
