= Hypolepis parallelogramma =

Scientific classification
- Kingdom: Plantae
- Clade: Tracheophytes
- Division: Polypodiophyta
- Class: Polypodiopsida
- Order: Polypodiales
- Family: Dennstaedtiaceae
- Genus: Hypolepis
- Species: H. parallelogramma

Binomial name
- Hypolepis parallelogramma (Kunze) C.Presl

Synonyms
- Cheilanthes parallelogramma Kunze

Species of fern

Hypolepis parallelogramma is a species of fern native to the foothills of the Andes.

Its fronds are 3 to 8 metres (10 to 30 ft) long, borne on brown stipes which grow paler in color towards the blade, armed with 0.6 millimetres (0.02 in) thorns. The rachis, like the top of the stipe, is light brown to straw-colored. The blades are oblong in shape and tripinnate, the pinnulets at the base being lobed (tripinnate-pinnatifid). Scattered tiny hairs are present on the underside (only) of the costae, costules, and some veins. Sori are at the edge of the leaf with straw-colored pseudoindusia. It most closely resembles H. melanochlaena, H. repens, and H. scandens, all of which are also large with thorny stems.

The species was originally described by Gustav Kunze in 1834 as Cheilanthes parallelogramma. Presl transferred it to the genus Hypolepis in 1836. Schwartsburd and Prado designated a Peruvian collection by Poeppig made in 1829 as the lectotype in 2016.

Hypolepis parallelogramma grows in the forests at the base of the Andes from Colombia and Venezuela south to Bolivia, at altitudes from 850 to 2,700 metres (2,800 to 8,900 ft).

== Notes and references ==
=== Works cited ===
- Kunze, Gustav (1834). "Synopsis plantarum Cryptogamicarum ab Ed. Poeppig. in Cuba insula et America meridionali collectarum". Linnaea (in Latin). 9 (1): 1–111.
- Presl, Carl Borivoj (1836). Tentamen Pteridologiae (in Latin). Vol. 1. Prague: Filiorum Theophili Haase.
- Schwartsburd, Pedro Bond; Prado, Jefferson (2016). "A Taxonomic Revision of the South American Species of Hypolepis (Dennstaedtiaceae), Part II". American Fern Journal. 106 (1): 1–53. doi:10.1640/0002-8444-106.1.1. S2CID 86244782.
