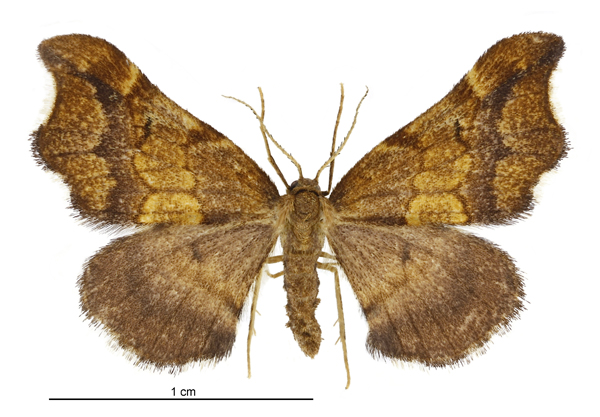
- Female
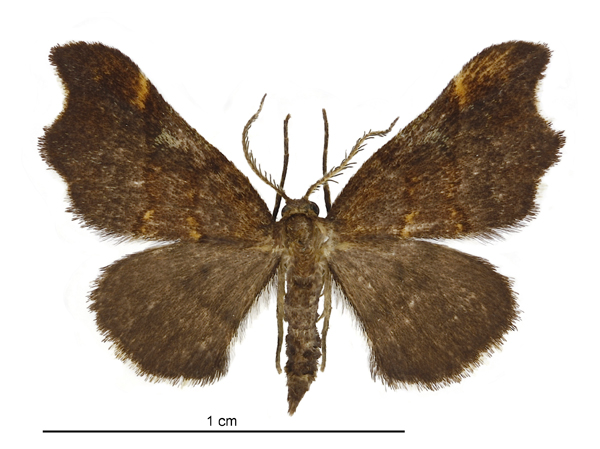
- Male

Scientific classification
- Kingdom: Animalia
- Phylum: Arthropoda
- Class: Insecta
- Order: Lepidoptera
- Family: Geometridae
- Genus: Paradetis; Meyrick, 1885
- Species: P. porphyrias

Binomial name
- Paradetis porphyrias (Meyrick, 1883)

Synonyms
- Generic: Parysatis Meyrick, 1883; Specific: Parysatis porphyrias Meyrick, 1883

= Paradetis =

Genus of moths endemic to New Zealand

Paradetis is a monotypic moth genus in the family Geometridae. Its only species, Paradetis porphyrias, also known as the orange and purple fern looper, is endemic to New Zealand. The genus and species were first described by Edward Meyrick, the genus in 1885 and the species in 1883. It is found in both the North and South Islands. This species frequents the ferny glens and the banks of mountain streams. It is thought to be widespread in native forests with high rainfall. The larvae likely feeds on the fern Hypolepis millefolium. Adults are commonly on the wing from December to February and fly by the day close to the ground. When at rest the adult has its fore-wings placed slightly backwards, the antennae extended forwards and the end of the abdomen turned upwards. Adults have been trapped via a Mercury-vapour lamp.

== Taxonomy ==
This genus was originally named Parysatis by Meyrick in 1883. However in 1885 Meyrick renamed this genus Paradetis as the former name was preoccupied.

This species was first described by Meyrick in 1883 under the name Parysatis porphyrias. Meyrick went on to give a more detailed description of the species in 1884. In 1885 Meyrick renamed the genus of this species Paradetis and from that time this species has been known as Paradetis porphyrias. George Hudson illustrated and discussed this species under this name in both of his books New Zealand Moths and Butterflies (Macro-lepidoptera) in 1898 and The Butterflies and Moths of New Zealand in 1928. The female holotype is held at the Natural History Museum, London.

== Description ==
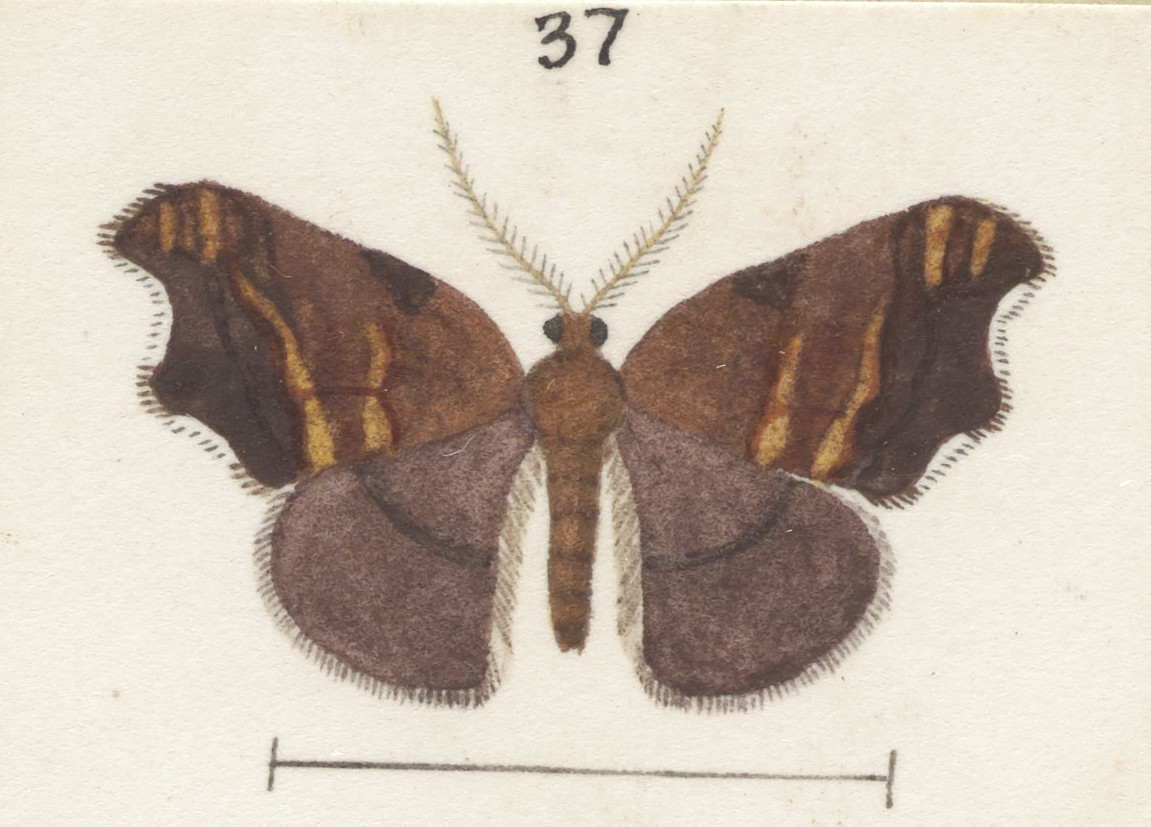
Male

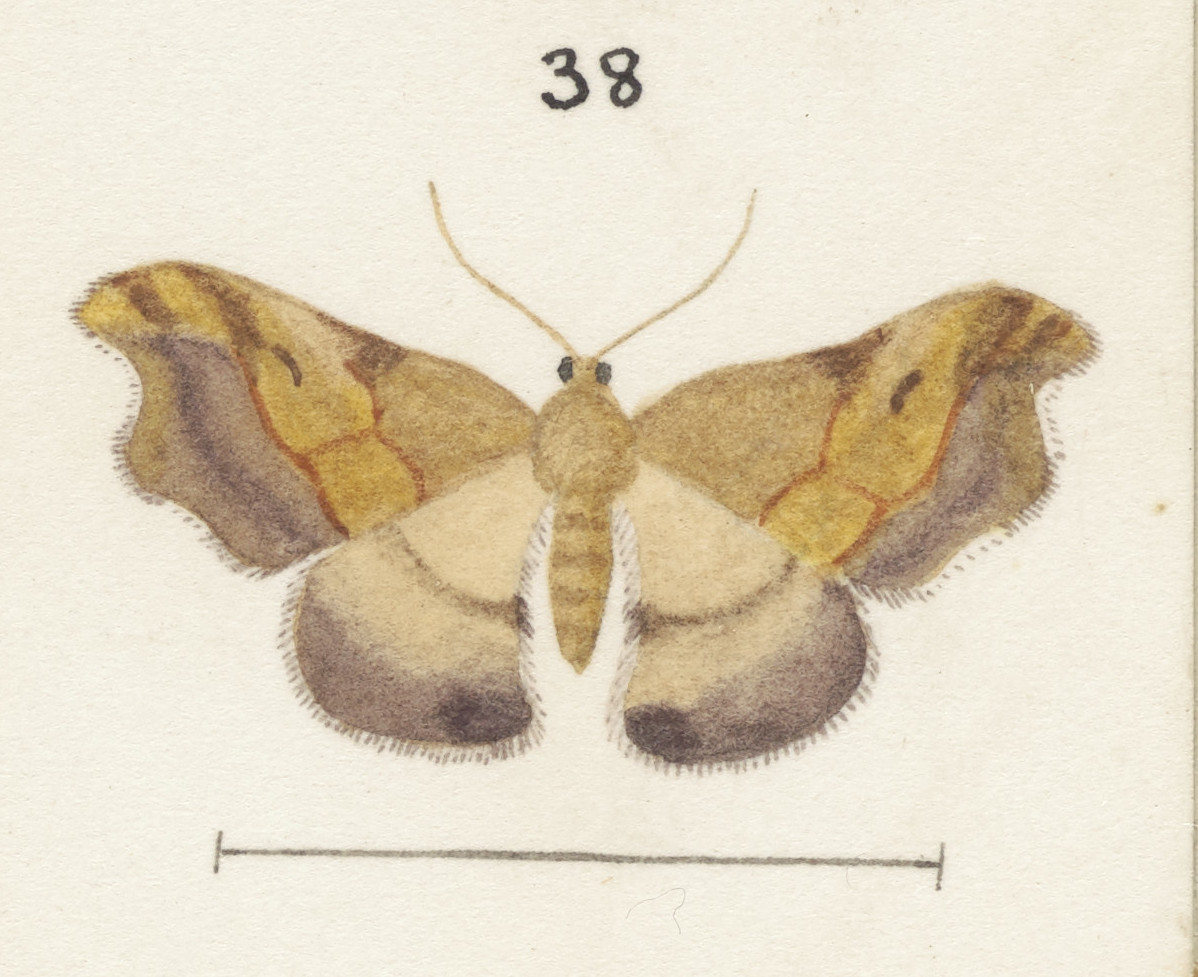
Female

The larva of this species is thin and green and when mature is 20 mm long.

Meyrick described the adult female of the species as follows:

Female. — 20 mm. Forewings moderate, costa sinuate in middle, apex almost acute, hindmargin deeply excavated on upper half and more shortly on lower third, so as to project bluntly below middle; yellow-ochreous, irregularly mixed with brown and purplish; veins clearly marked with fuscous; two slender ochreous-brown transverse lines, dilated on costa, first before middle, bent inwards near costa, second beyond middle, almost straight; beyond second a broad purplish shade, except near costa, dilated beneath to reach hindmargin; hindmargin purple: cilia white on excavations. Hindwings moderate, hindmargin shortly sinuate near inner angle; pale ochreous mixed with fuscous and purplish; a fuscous transverse fine before middle; a very broad purplish hindmarginal band.

Hudson described the adults of this species as follows:

The expansion of the wings of the male is about 3/4 inch; of the female fully 7/8 inch. The fore-wings of the male are deep purplish-brown; there is a wavy, reddish, transverse line at about 1/3 and another at about 2/3 between these two lines near the dorsum there are often several more or less distinct, yellow marks; there is a conspicuous orange-yellow patch at the apex. The hind-wings are deep purplish-brown. The cilia of all the wings are white. The fore-wing has the apex hooked and the termen deeply excavated above and below the middle. The female is very much paler; the lines are more distinct and the veins are marked in brown.

== Distribution ==
P. porphyrias is endemic to New Zealand. Meyrick first collected the species near Ōtira Gorge at Arthur's Pass in January. The species has also been found at Mount Arthur, Castle Hill in Canterbury and Lake Wakatipu. It has also been observed in the Wellington region.

== Habitat and host species ==
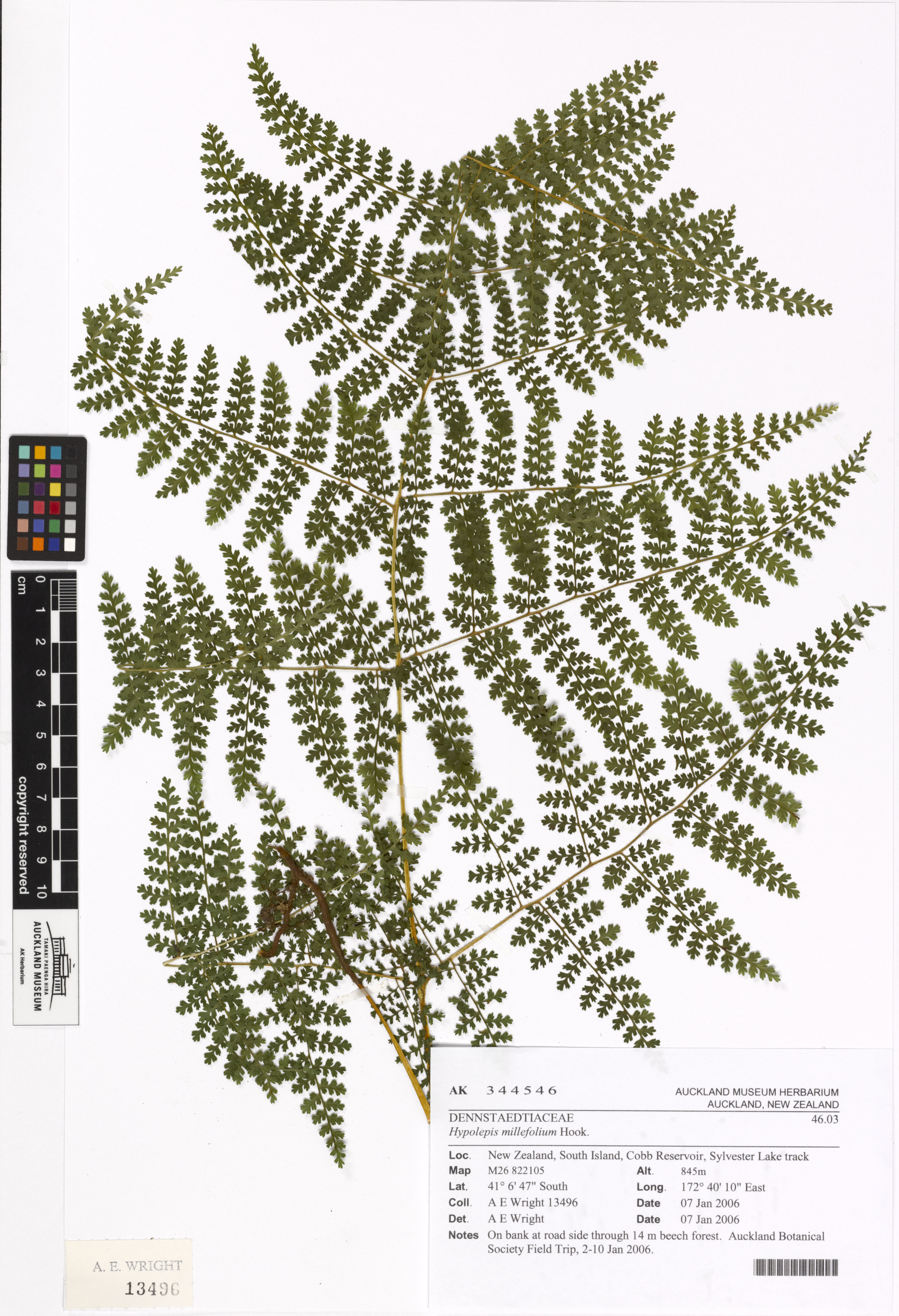
Hypolepis millefolium

Hudson stated that this species inhabits ferny glens in beech forests and often can be seen in open spots in this habitat. Alfred Philpott mentioned that the species frequented the banks of mountain streams. This species is thought to be widespread in native forests with high-rainfall. P. porphyrias larvae likely feed on Hypolepis millefolium.

== Behaviour ==
Adults of this species are on the wing from December until February and fly by day with a dizzying flight close to the ground. When at rest the adult has its fore-wings placed slightly backwards, the antennae extended forwards and the end of the abdomen turned upwards. When the fern fronds wither they turn a purplish-brown colour like the moth and it is consequently very inconspicuous and difficult to capture. This species has been trapped via a Mercury-vapour lamp.
