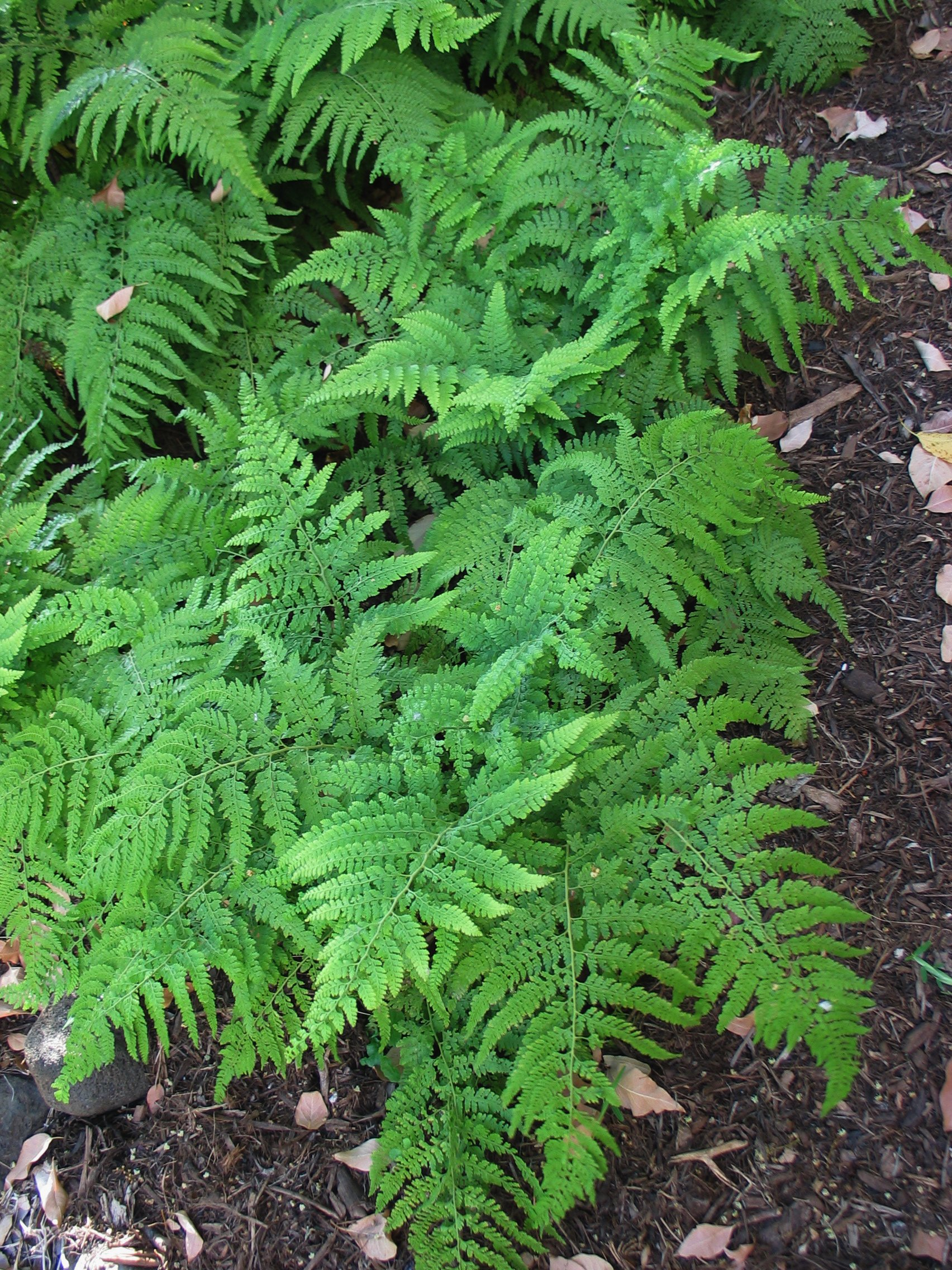
- Microlepia strigosa var. strigosa

Scientific classification
- Kingdom: Plantae
- Clade: Embryophytes
- Clade: Tracheophytes
- Division: Polypodiophyta
- Class: Polypodiopsida
- Order: Polypodiales
- Family: Dennstaedtiaceae
- Genus: Microlepia
- Species: M. strigosa

Binomial name
- Microlepia strigosa (Thunb.) C.Presl.

= Microlepia strigosa =

Species of fern

Microlepia strigosa, known as hay-scented fern, lace fern, rigid lace fern and palapalai, is a fern indigenous to the Hawaiian islands and is also native to other parts of the tropics and subtropics including India and Malaysia. This fern belongs to a group of about seventy Microlepia species in the bracken or hay-scented fern family (Dennstaedtiaceae). There are two indigenous species and a hybrid found in the main Hawaiian Islands. It is also known by the botanical names: Davallia hirta, Davallia setosa, Davallia strigosa, Dicksonia kaulfussiana, Dicksonia strigosa, Microlepia hirta, Microlepia setosa, Stenoloma tenuifolium, Trichomanes strigosum. It has coarse, light to medium green fronds which can grow to more than 3 ft (0.9 m) long.

== Uses ==
Early Hawaiians used the fronds to decorate hula altars dedicated to Laka, goddess of hula. The ferns were used as head lei (lei poʻo), neck lei (lei ʻāʻī), and wrist lei (lei kūpeʻe) and to provide a soft base against the skin. The plants were believed to be a cure for insanity. It was also used to bathe in and young leaf fronds were fed to babies.
