= Hiya =

Hiya may refer to:

- Hiya (company), an American caller profile company
- Hiya (film), a 2016 Korean film
- Hiya (plant), a genus of ferns in the family Dennstaedtiaceae
- hiya (火矢), an antiquated Japanese term for early rockets, as in bō-hiya

== See also ==
- Hello, a greeting commonly rendered as "Hiya"
- Hi-YAH!, a movie streaming service showing mostly Asian action films
- Hi-Yah, a fictional land in the American TV series Adventures with Kanga Roddy
- Kiai, the short yell uttered by martial artists, commonly rendered in forms such as "Hi-yah!"
