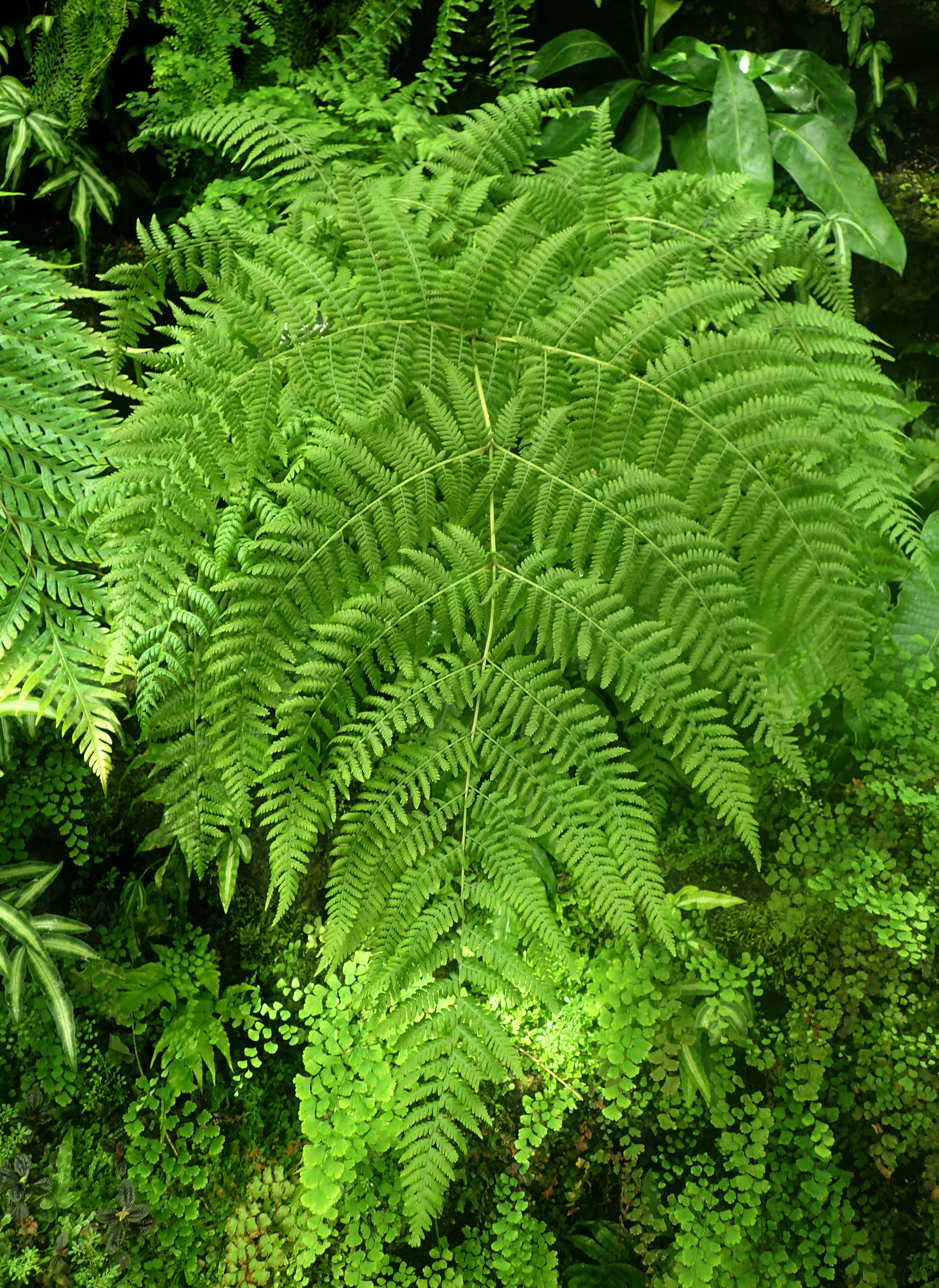

Scientific classification
- Kingdom: Plantae
- Clade: Embryophytes
- Clade: Tracheophytes
- Division: Polypodiophyta
- Class: Polypodiopsida
- Order: Polypodiales
- Family: Dennstaedtiaceae
- Genus: Hypolepis
- Species: H. resistens

Binomial name
- Hypolepis resistens (Kunze) Hook.

Synonyms
- Hypolepis glandulifera Brownsey & Chinnock; Hypolepis punctata (Thunb.) Mett.

= Hypolepis resistens =

Downy ground fern

Species of fern

Hypolepis resistens also known as Hypolepis glandulifera is a widespread species of fern found in India, South-east Asia and Australia. Fronds are mostly between 0.6 and 1.5 metres long with an erect habit.
