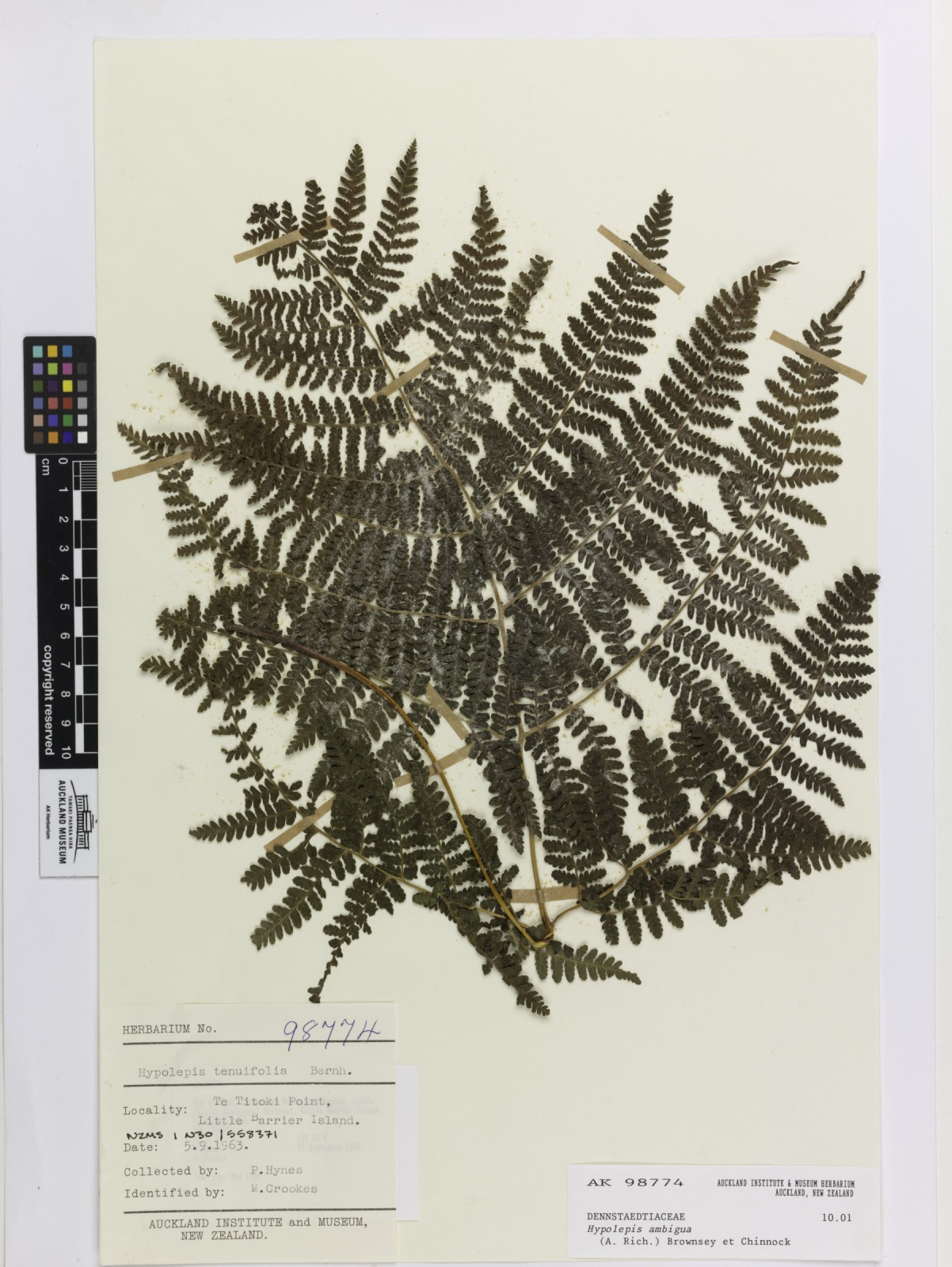

Scientific classification
- Kingdom: Plantae
- Clade: Tracheophytes
- Division: Polypodiophyta
- Class: Polypodiopsida
- Order: Polypodiales
- Family: Dennstaedtiaceae
- Genus: Hypolepis
- Species: H. ambigua

Binomial name
- Hypolepis ambigua Brownsey & Chinnock

= Hypolepis ambigua =

Species of fern

Hypolepis ambigua, commonly known as pigfern, is a species of fern that grows in New Zealand.

== Description ==
Hypolepis ambigua is a fern native to New Zealand that grows with fronds from 0.21 m to 1.85 m tall. It has long-creeping rhizomes covered in red-brown hairs, that give rise to fronds at intervals of 20–200 mm. This allows it to form a ground cover similar to Pteridium esculentum. The primary pinnae, or leaflets of the frond, are large at the base and get smaller towards the apex. The secondary and tertiary pinnae, or sub leaflets, are narrow and may decrease in size as the primary pinnae, or are a more consistent oblong shape. Reproductive structures, called sori, are approximately round and protected by lamina flaps. The structure of the sori is representative of the genus Hypolepis (hypo is Latin for under, and lepis for scale). It is most commonly confused with Hypolepis dickinsonioides; however, H. ambigua does not have the sticky glandular hair that H. dickinsonioides has.

== Geographic distribution and habitat ==
=== Natural range ===
Hypolepis ambigua is native to the North and South Island of New Zealand, the Three Kings Islands, the Chatham Islands, and Stewart Island. On the North Island, it can be found in lowland to lower montane areas in Auckland, Taranaki, Volcanic Plateau, Gisborne, Northland, and the southern part of the North Island. On the South Island, it can be found in almost all coastal regions except for eastern Otago. It is, however, less common inland and not often found in southern Canterbury and central Otago.

=== Non-native range ===
The species has become naturalised on the island of Bute in Scotland.

== Habitat preferences ==
H. ambigua is a lowlands species that prefers to grow in more open areas. It can be most commonly found in bush margins, forest clearings, open grassland, open forest, and scrub. It often forms large colonies due to its fast-growing rhizomes. Its propensity for disturbed soil means that it also frequently is found in urban areas.

== Life cycle and phenology ==
Being a member of the class Polypodiopsida, Hypolepis ambigua has the same life cycle as other ferns. There is an alternation of generations, the sporophyte stage and the gametophyte stage. There is no specific research on the phenology of H. ambigua; however, the majority of ferns are perennial and reproduce several times after reaching maturity and have been shown to reproduce seasonally. As a herbaceous fern, H. ambigua is fertile after one year and remains fertile for the rest of its life. In the winter some of the older fronds die off, and then in the spring new fiddleheads emerge.

== Ecology ==
=== Diet and foraging ===
Ferns prefer soils high in organic matter, with good aeration, and consistent access to water. H. ambigua specifically thrives in disturbed soils such as those found in urban areas and forest clearings.

=== Predators, parasites and diseases ===
There is limited research on specific pests and diseases of H. ambigua, however, in general the majority of herbivores that feed on ferns are arthropods. There are proportionally many fewer plant-eating insects per fern species than angiosperm species. The three main orders of insects associated with ferns consist of 43% of all insects associated with ferns, and all have piercing-sucking mouthparts like aphids. Some common pests of ferns are aphids, mealybugs, millipedes, mites, scale insects, pill bugs, and slugs. While there is a wealth of information on the diseases that commonly infect cultivated fern species (blights, molds, rusts, and rots), there is no specific research regarding the diseases that affect H. ambigua or herbaceous ferns in New Zealand.

== Other information ==
H. ambigua frequently hybridizes with various other ferns including H. dicksonioides, H. lacteal, H. millefolium, and H. rufobarata. It hybridizes with H. dicksonioides when both species occur in the same area, however, since H. dicksonioides only occurs around thermals and H. ambigua in a much wider range of habitats, the hybridization is very localized to the thermals. It is also the most polymorphic species in its genus in New Zealand.
