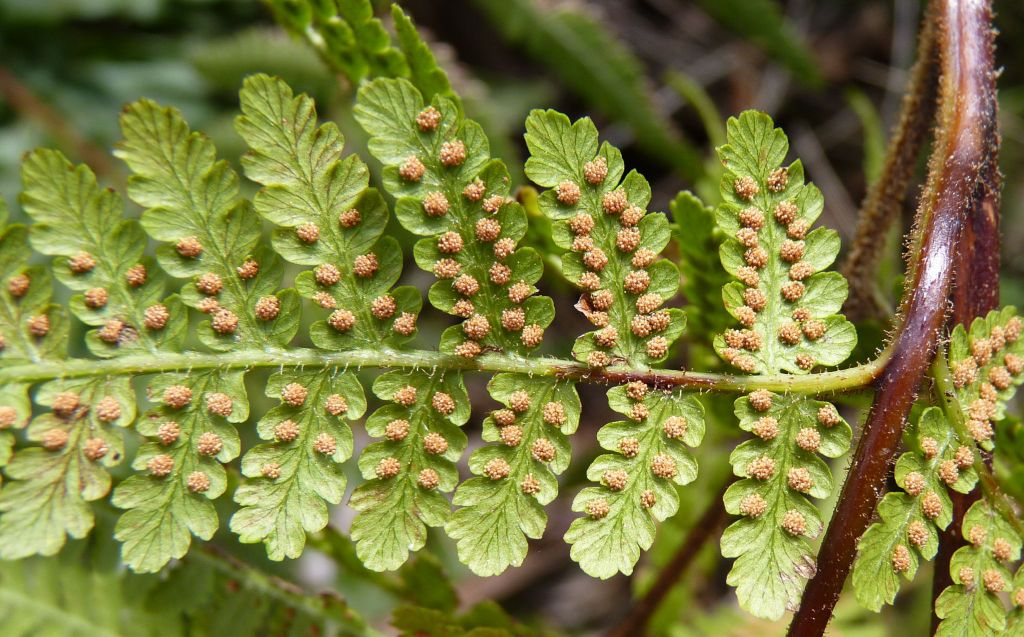
- Hypolepis rugosula, underside

Scientific classification
- Kingdom: Plantae
- Clade: Tracheophytes
- Division: Polypodiophyta
- Class: Polypodiopsida
- Order: Polypodiales
- Family: Dennstaedtiaceae
- Genus: Hypolepis
- Species: H. rugosula

Binomial name
- Hypolepis rugosula (Labill.) J.Sm. 1846

Synonyms
- Phegopteris punctata var. rugosula (Labill.) Hillebr.; Phegopteris rugosula (Labill.) Mett.; Dryopteris punctata subsp. rugosula (Labill.) C.Chr.; Dryopteris punctata var. rugosula (Labill.) Domin; Polypodium punctatum var. rugosulum (Labill.) Hook. & Baker; Polypodium rugosulum Labill.

= Hypolepis rugosula =

Species of plant

Hypolepis rugosula (common name ruddy ground fern), is a common ground fern found throughout rainforests and wet sclerophyll forests, especially after recent disturbances in the forests.

== Habitat ==
Hypolepis rugosula is found most frequently in stream beds, damp gullies, inside drainage ditches, swampy grounds, clearings and margins of forest or open areas. It grows on soils or even rocky areas. Although usually restricted to smaller patches, in freshly disturbed soils it can form large extensive patches. It is more frequent at higher altitudes.

== Identification ==
Recognized by the burgundy colour of its main axes (petioles, rachises and pinna-rachises), red/brown stipe, and the vascular bundle of petioles which are pi-shaped and distally split into two S-shaped bundles, as well as absence of soral hairs.

== Infraspecifics ==
There are several accepted infraspecifics

- Hypolepis rugosula subsp. africana (C.Chr.) Schwartsb. & J.Prado
- Hypolepis rugosula subsp. brownseyana Schwartsb. & J.Prado
- Hypolepis rugosula subsp. colorata (Christ) Schwartsb. & J.Prado
- Hypolepis rugosula subsp. formosa Schwartsb. & M.H.Oliveira
- Hypolepis rugosula subsp. lactea (Brownsey & Chinnock) Schwartsb.
- Hypolepis rugosula subsp. pichi-sermolliana Schwartsb. & J.Prado
- Hypolepis rugosula subsp. poeppigiana (Mett.) Schwartsb. & J.Prado
- Hypolepis rugosula subsp. pradoana Schwartsb.
- Hypolepis rugosula subsp. pulcherrima (J.K.Underw. & Maxon) Schwartsb. & J.Prado
- Hypolepis rugosula subsp. rouxii Schwartsb. & M.H.Oliveira
- Hypolepis rugosula subsp. rudis (Kunze) Schwartsb.
- Hypolepis rugosula subsp. rufobarbata (Colenso) Schwartsb.
- Hypolepis rugosula subsp. rugosula
- Hypolepis rugosula subsp. subantarctica (Brownsey & Chinnock) Schwartsb.
- Hypolepis rugosula subsp. villosoviscida (Thouars) Schwartsb. & J.Prado
- Hypolepis rugosula subsp. viscida (Roxb.) Schwartsb. & J.Prado
