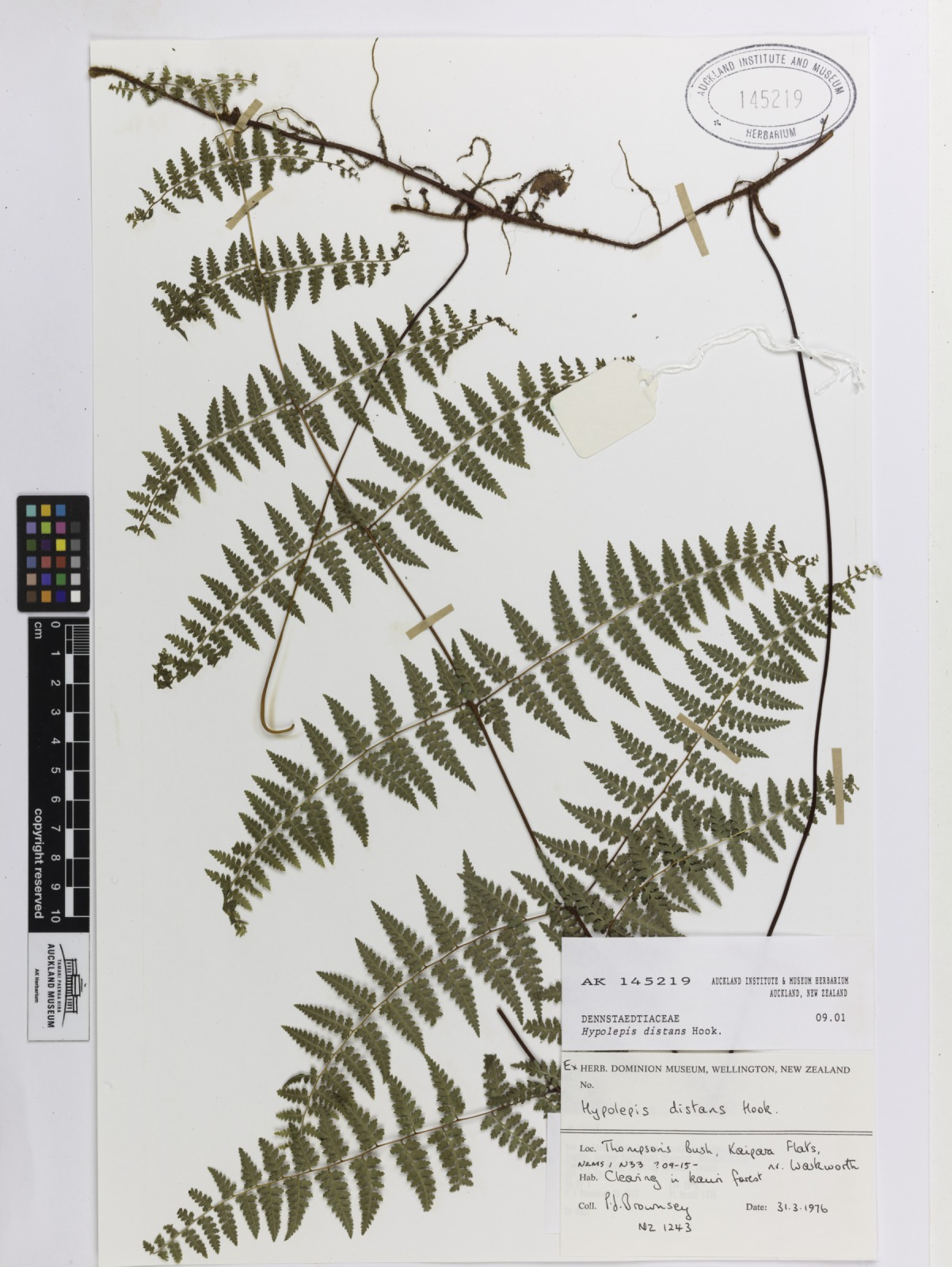

Scientific classification
- Kingdom: Plantae
- Clade: Tracheophytes
- Division: Polypodiophyta
- Class: Polypodiopsida
- Order: Polypodiales
- Family: Dennstaedtiaceae
- Genus: Hiya
- Species: H. distans

Binomial name
- Hiya distans (Hook.) Brownsey & Perrie

Synonyms
- Hypolepis distans Hook.

= Hiya distans =

Scrambling ground fern

Species of fern

Hiya distans, formerly Hypolepis distans, known as the scrambling ground fern is a small fern found in soils with a high humus layer, or swampy areas in New Zealand. Less often seen in Australia. Rarely recorded in north west Tasmania and King Island. There is one known population on the Australian mainland, at Macquarie Pass in New South Wales. An introduced population is at the remote Norfolk Island in the south Pacific Ocean. The scrambling ground fern features 20 to 40 pairs of primary pinnae, opposite or subopposite on the stem, at an angle of 90 degrees. The specific epithet distans is derived from Latin, meaning "widely spaced".
