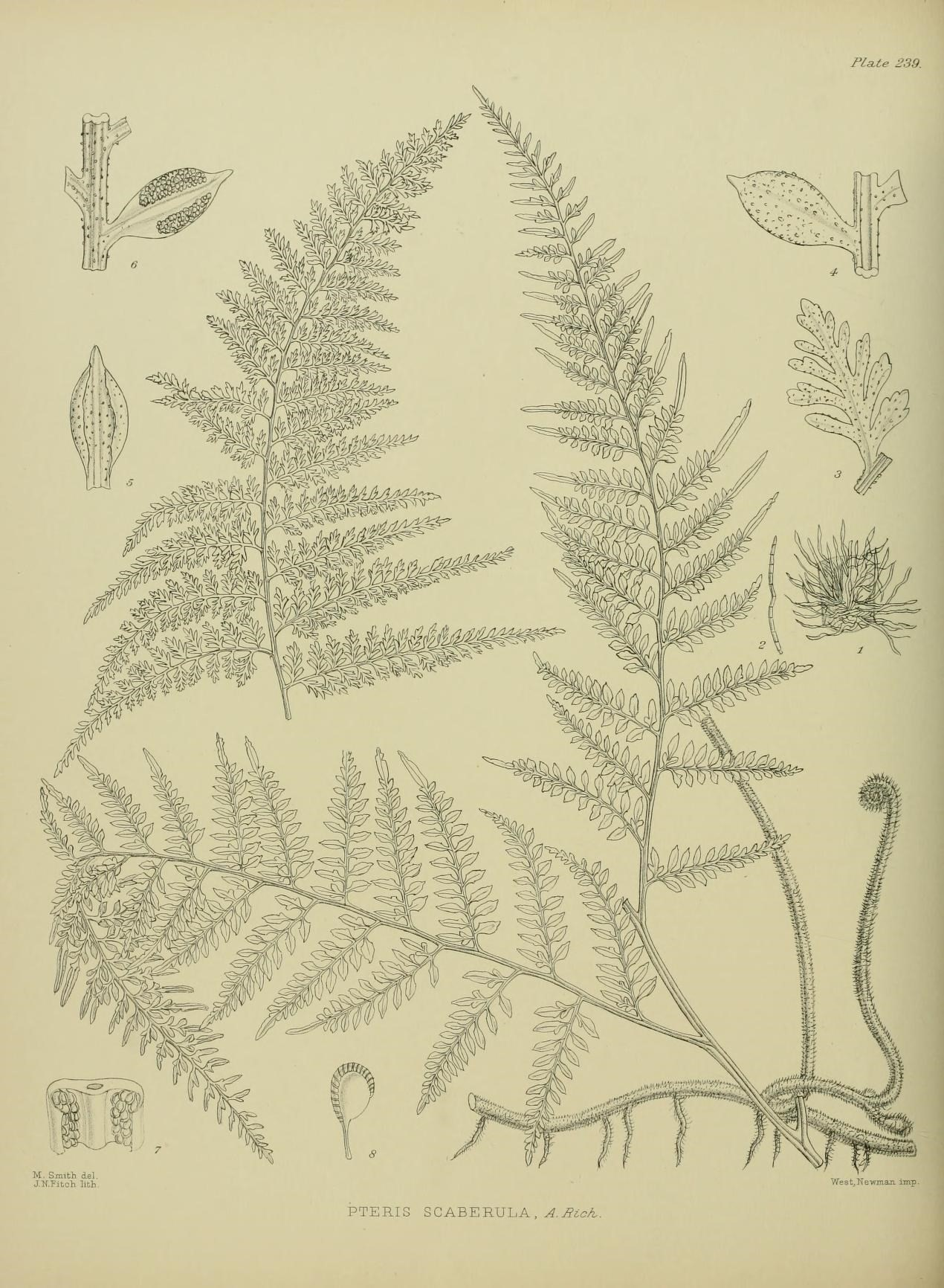

Scientific classification
- Kingdom: Plantae
- Clade: Tracheophytes
- Division: Polypodiophyta
- Class: Polypodiopsida
- Order: Polypodiales
- Family: Dennstaedtiaceae
- Genus: Paesia
- Species: P. scaberula

Binomial name
- Paesia scaberula (A.Rich.) Kuhn

Synonyms
- Allosorus scaberulus (A.Rich.) C.Presl, 1836.; Ornithopteris scaberula (A.Rich.) J.Sm., 1875.; Pteris microphylla A.Cunn., 1837.; Pteris scaberula A.Rich., 1832.

= Paesia scaberula =

Species of fern

Paesia scaberula, the ring fern or mātata, is a lacy, creeping New Zealand fern that grows up to 115 centimetres (45 in) with yellow-green fronds, brown stalks and a distinctive smell.

== Distribution ==
This fern can be found throughout the North and South Islands, Stewart Island and the Chatham Islands.
