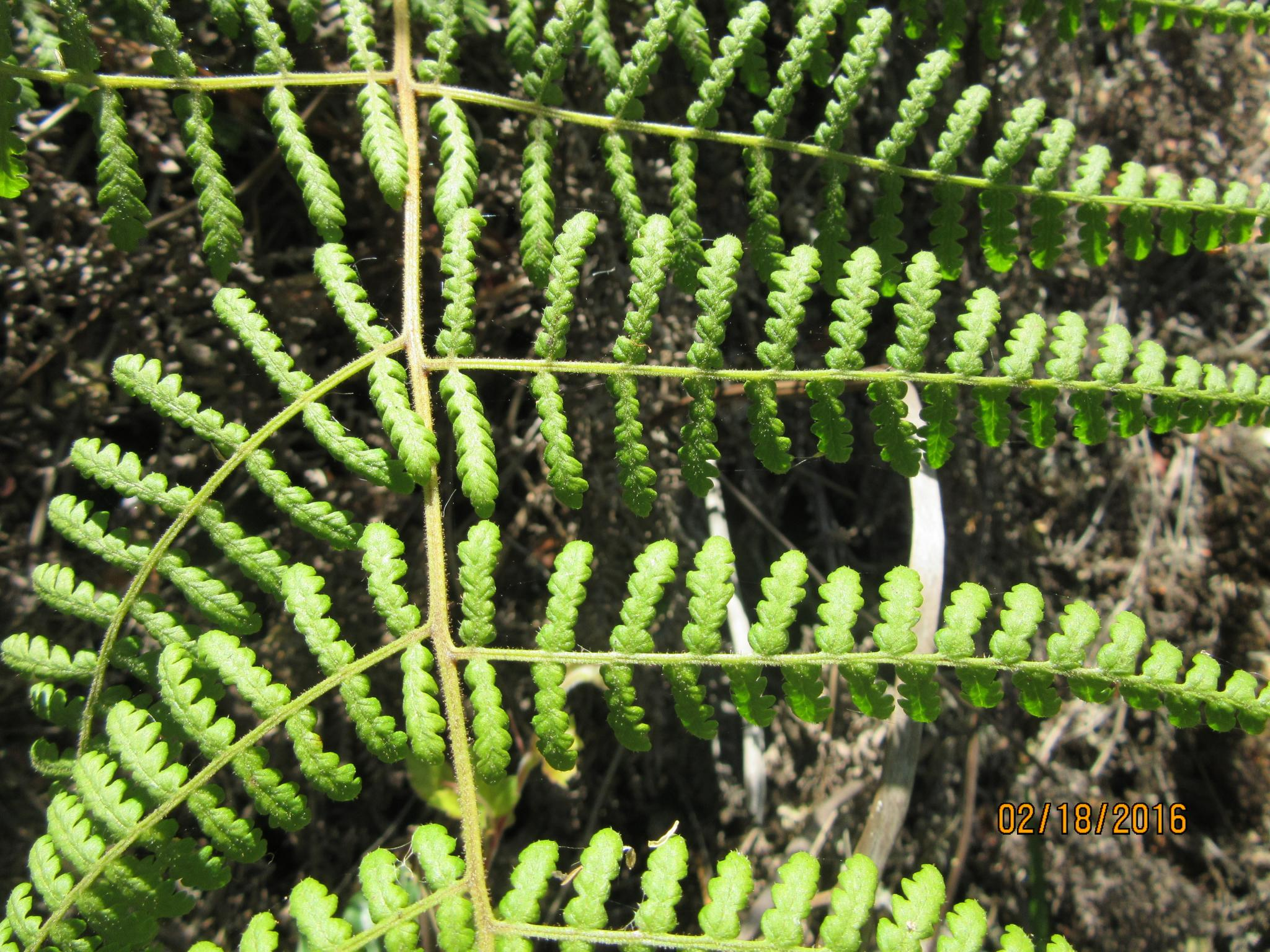

Scientific classification
- Kingdom: Plantae
- Clade: Tracheophytes
- Division: Polypodiophyta
- Class: Polypodiopsida
- Order: Polypodiales
- Family: Dennstaedtiaceae
- Genus: Hypolepis
- Species: H. poeppigii

Binomial name
- Hypolepis poeppigii (Kunze) Mett. ex Maxon (1941)

Synonyms
- Dryopteris sturmii (Phil.) C.Chr. (1905); Hypolepis chilensis Fée (1857) nom. superfl.; Hypolepis rugosula var. poeppigii (Kunze) C.Chr. (1920); Phegopteris poeppigii (Kunze) Fée (1854); Phegopteris sturmii Phil. (1896); Polypodium poeppigii Kunze (1834)

= Hypolepis poeppigii =

Species of plant

Hypolepis poeppigii is a fern species in the family Dennstaedtiaceae that has no common name. It is native to Chile and the Falkland Islands.

It was first described by German botanist Georg Heinrich Mettenius, but his description was not considered validly published, and American botanist William Ralph Maxon later described the species in a valid publication.

== Description ==
Hypolepis poeppigii has either individual antheridia or antheridia grouped on an antheridiophore.

== Distribution ==
Hypolepis poeppigii is native to central and southern Chile.

== Bibliography ==
- Heusser, C. J. (2003). Ice Age Southern Andes: A Chronicle of Palaeoecological Events. Elsevier. ISBN 9780080534381.
