= Lace fern =

Lace fern is a common name for several plants and may refer to:

- Asparagus setaceus, a flowering plant native to Southern Africa
- Leptolepia novae-zelandiae, a fern native to New Zealand
- Myriopteris gracillima, a fern native to northwestern North America
