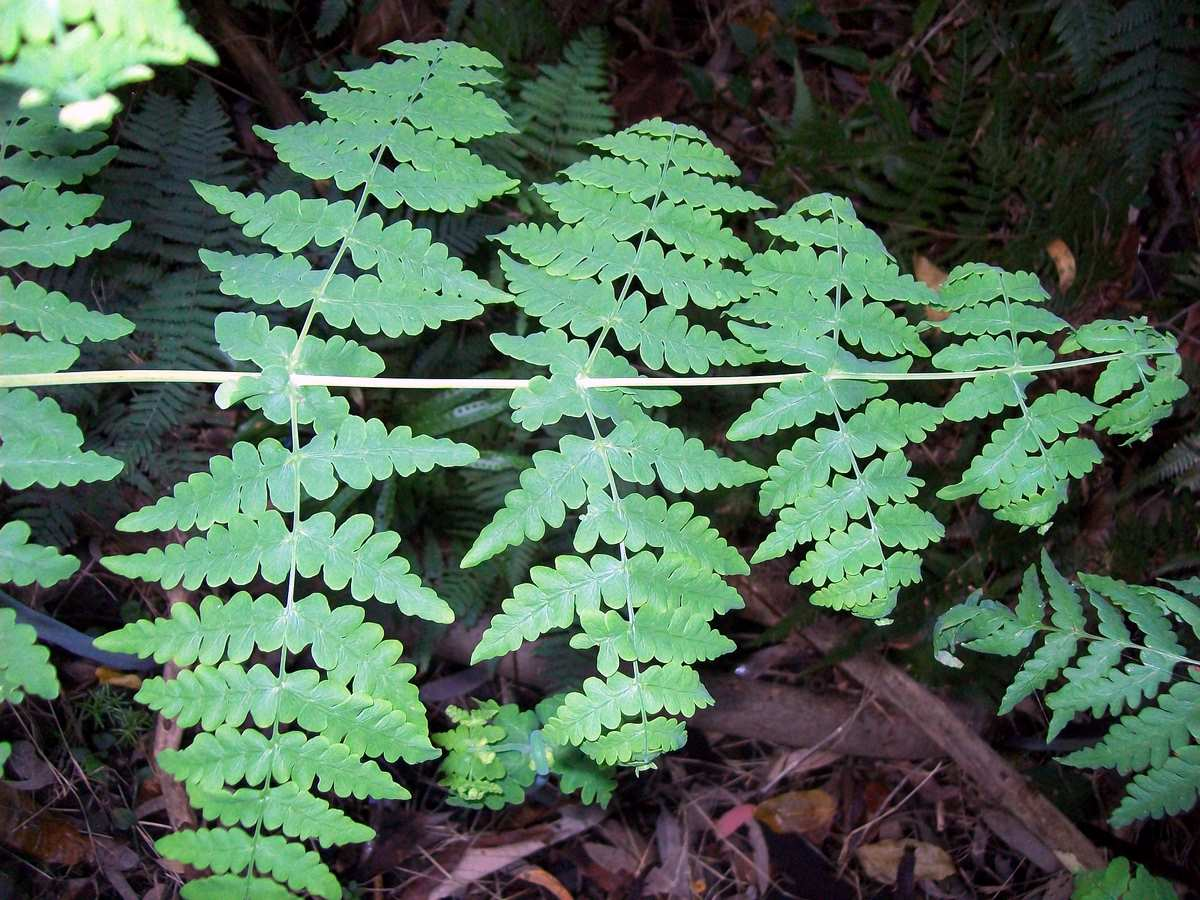

Scientific classification
- Kingdom: Plantae
- Clade: Tracheophytes
- Division: Polypodiophyta
- Class: Polypodiopsida
- Order: Polypodiales
- Family: Dennstaedtiaceae
- Genus: Histiopteris
- Species: H. incisa

Binomial name
- Histiopteris incisa (Thunb.) J.Sm.

Synonyms
- Phegopteris incisa (Thunb.) Keyserl.; Litobrochia incisa (Thunb.) C.Presl; Pteris incisa Thunb.; Histiopteris vespertilionis (Labill.) J.Sm.; Pteris brunoniana Endl.; Litobrochia vespertilionis (Labill.) C.Presl; Pteris australasica Desv.; Pteris vespertilionis Labill.; Pteris comans G.Forst.

= Histiopteris incisa =

Bat's wing fern

Species of fern

Histiopteris incisa, the bat's wing fern, water fern or fern mata, is a common plant found in Australia, New Zealand and other islands in the south Pacific region. Usually found in moist areas, where it may form large colonies. The lowermost lobes of each pinnae have a bat wing like appearance, giving the fern its common name.

== Description ==
Sori arrangement on Histiopteris incisa

Histiopteris incisa is a medium-sized fern, usually producing fronds of approximately 60–200 cm in length. Fronds are widely spaced, distinct, and slightly dimorphic with fertile lobes slightly narrower than the infertile lobes. Fertile lobes have the sori continuous, linear and exindusiate (without an indusium) but protected by reflexed leaf margins. Young fronds have a thick and whitish blue-green succulent stipe. Mature fronds are thin, long with red-brown stipes. Pinnae are pale greyish-green, almost a glaucous colour, they are paired and opposite and set at a wide angle and very lobed. The two lowermost lobes of each pinnae result in a bat's wing like appearance giving the fern its common name. This species has a robust creeping rhizome of 5-10mm width and is covered in brown or reddish scales.

== Habitat and Distribution ==
The bat's wing fern is widely distributed and abundant across most of the southern hemisphere including Tasmania. However, it is less common in exposed highland situations and mostly absent from low rainfall regions.

This fern is a ‘weedy’ opportunistic species, freely colonising disturbed sites on the margins of, or within, wet forest, and often forming extensive colonies. It mainly inhabits high rainfall forests with poorly drained soils. Found mainly in shaded areas as shade is necessary for pinnae survival although it can grow in less shaded areas with sufficient water availability. Bat's wing fern is commonly found growing on the margins of wet forests, along more open scrubby creeks and gullies and at the base of cliffs. In rare situations with optimal growing conditions, the fronds can reach lengths of 7m.

== Uses ==
The bat's wing fern is found in many Tasmanian nurseries and is popular as both an indoor or outdoor plant, as it requires little sunlight and is very aesthetically pleasing. It is a popular pot plant, easily grown in a pot or open ground and is fast spreading in cool, moist environments.
