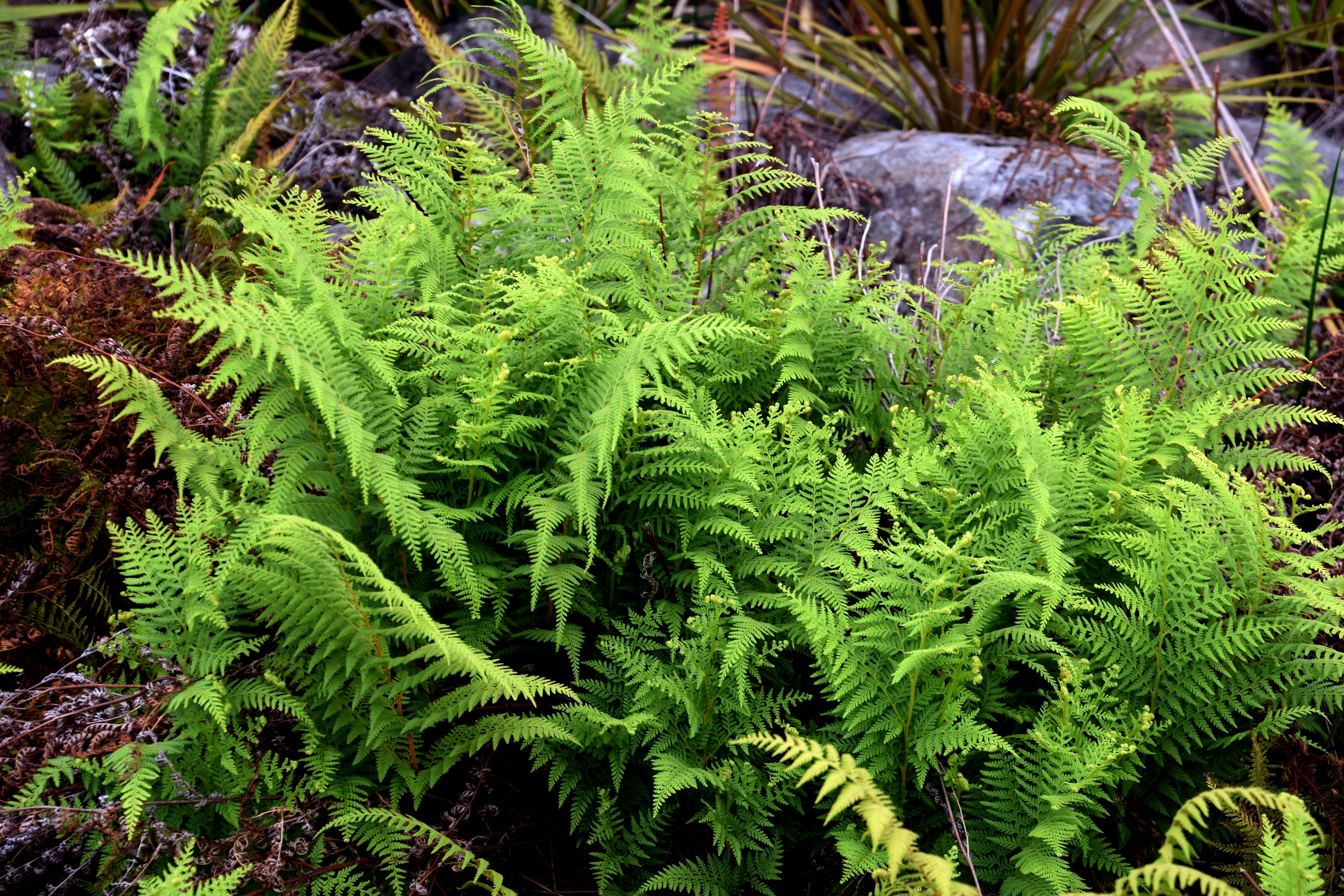
- Paesia scaberula

Scientific classification
- Kingdom: Plantae
- Clade: Tracheophytes
- Division: Polypodiophyta
- Class: Polypodiopsida
- Order: Polypodiales
- Family: Dennstaedtiaceae
- Genus: Paesia; J. St.-Hil.

Type species
- Paesia viscosa (syn of P. glandulosa) J. St.-Hil.

= Paesia =

Genus of ferns

Paesia is a genus of large, coarse ferns in the family Dennstaedtiaceae described as a genus in 1833. Species are known from South America, Central America, East Asia, and New Caledonia.

accepted species

1. Paesia acclivis (Kunze) Kuhn - Venezuela, Colombia, Ecuador, Peru
2. Paesia amazonica (Christ) C. Chr. - Loreto Region in Peru
3. Paesia anfractuosa (Christ) C. Chr. - Panama, Costa Rica
4. Paesia glandulosa (Sw.) Kuhn - Panama, Costa Rica, Venezuela, Colombia, Ecuador, Peru, Bolivia
5. Paesia rugulosa (Labill.) Kuhn - Vietnam, New Caledonia
6. Paesia scalaris (Mett.) Kuhn
7. Paesia taiwanensis W.C. Shieh - Taiwan

unresolved species include

- Paesia scaberula (A.Rich.) Kuhn
