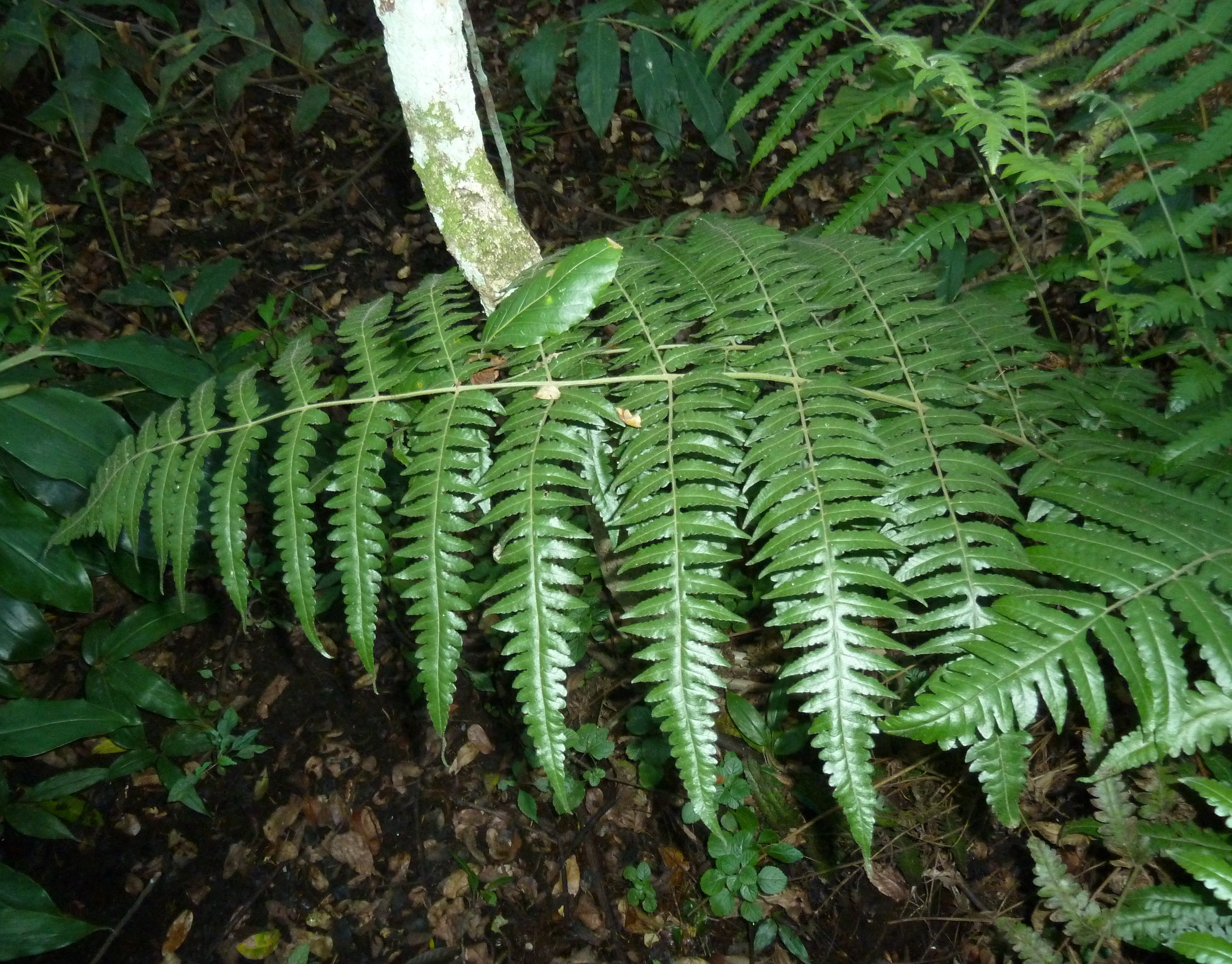
- Blotiella natalensis

Scientific classification
- Kingdom: Plantae
- Clade: Tracheophytes
- Division: Polypodiophyta
- Class: Polypodiopsida
- Order: Polypodiales
- Family: Dennstaedtiaceae
- Genus: Blotiella; R.M.Tryon 1962

= Blotiella =

Genus of ferns

Blotiella is a genus of ferns in the family Dennstaedtiaceae described as a genus in 1962. The genus was named in honor of Marie Laure Tardieu-Blot (1902–1998), who was a French pteridologist.

It was first published in Contr. Gray Herb. vol.191 on page 96 in 1962 by Rolla Milton Tryon.

== Species ==
As accepted by Kew;

1. Blotiella bouxiniana Pic.Serm. - Rwanda to Burundi
2. Blotiella confusa Jongkind & W. de Winter - western tropical Africa
3. Blotiella coriacea Verdc. - Tanzania
4. Blotiella coursii (Tardieu) Rakotondr. ex J.P.Roux 2009 - Madagascar
5. Blotiella crenata (Alston) Schelpe - Uganda to Angola
6. Blotiella currorii (Hook.) R.M.Tryon 1962 - central Africa
7. Blotiella glabra (Bory) R.M.Tryon 1962 - Madagascar, E + S Africa
8. Blotiella hieronymi (Kümmerle) Pic.Serm. 1983 - Kenya, Tanzania
9. Blotiella isaloensis (Tardieu) J.P.Roux - Madagascar
10. Blotiella lanceifolia (J.Agardh) Rakotondr. - Madagascar
11. Blotiella lindeniana (Hook.) R.M.Tryon 1962 - Central - South America
12. Blotiella madagascariensis (Hook.) R.M.Tryon 1962 - Madagascar
13. Blotiella mannii (Baker) Pic.Serm. 1977 - Cameroon
14. Blotiella marojejyensis J.P.Roux - Madagascar
15. Blotiella natalensis (Hook.) R.M.Tryon 1962 - E + SE + S Africa, Madagascar, Mauritius, Comoros
16. Blotiella pubescens (Kaulf.) R.M.Tryon 1962 - Madagascar
17. Blotiella reducta (C.Chr.) R.M.Tryon 1962 - Madagascar, tropical Africa
18. Blotiella sinuata Pic.Serm. 1983 - Zambia
19. Blotiella stipitata (Alston) Faden 1974 - Kenya, Tanzania
20. Blotiella tisserantii (Alston & Tardieu) Pic.Serm. 1983 - Cameroon, Gabon, Central African Republic
21. Blotiella trichosora Pic.Serm. - Burundi, Uganda, Tanzania
