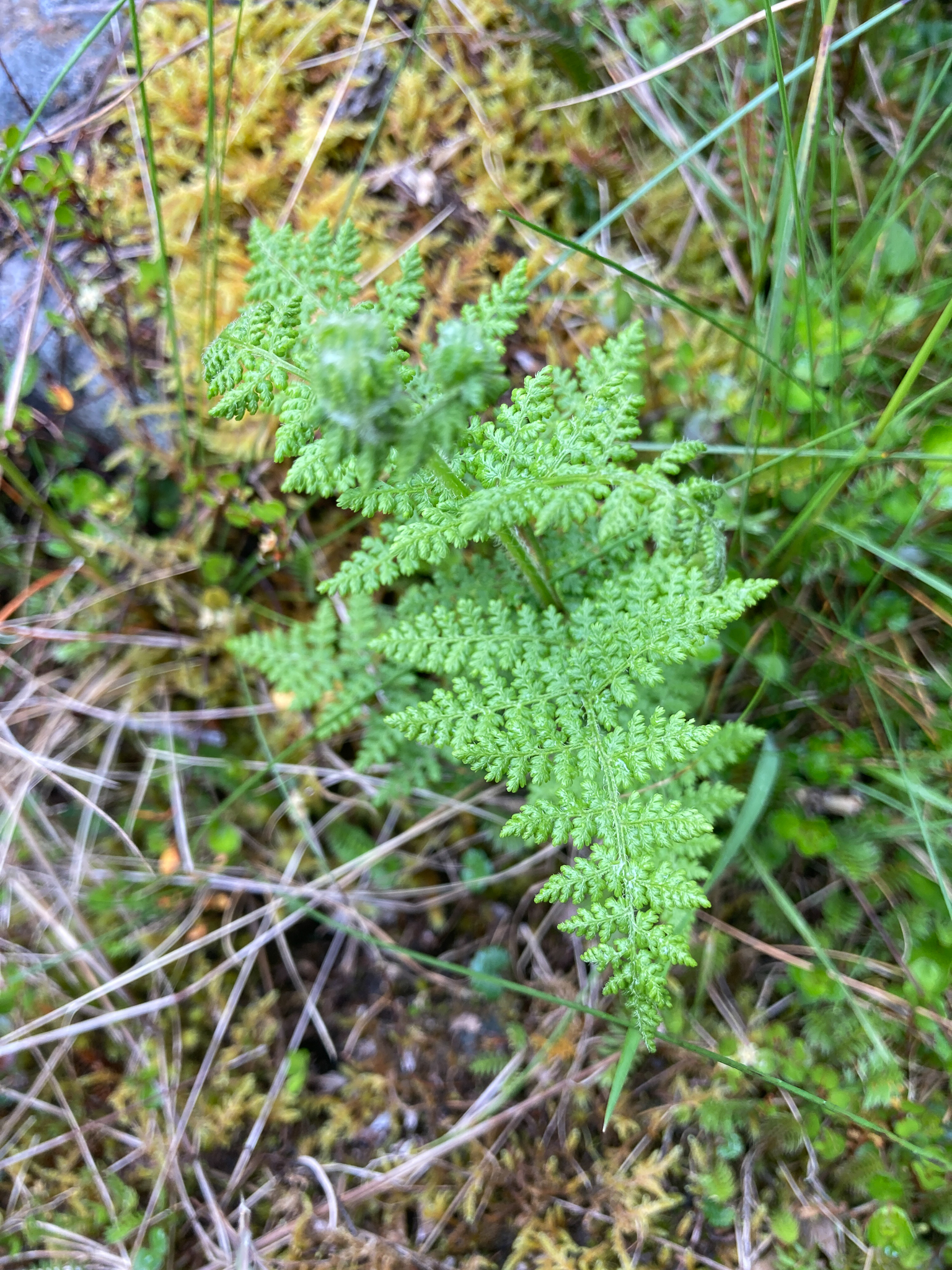
- Hypolepis millefolium in Fiordland National Park

Conservation status
- Not Threatened (NZ TCS)

Scientific classification
- Kingdom: Plantae
- Clade: Tracheophytes
- Division: Polypodiophyta
- Class: Polypodiopsida
- Order: Polypodiales
- Family: Dennstaedtiaceae
- Genus: Hypolepis
- Species: H. millefolium

Binomial name
- Hypolepis millefolium Hook.

= Hypolepis millefolium =

Species of plant endemic to New Zealand

Hypolepis millefolium, the thousand leaved fern, alpine pig fern, or summer green fern is a species of fern, endemic to New Zealand.

== Description ==
Hypolepis millefolium is easily distinguished from other ferns by the many lacy laminae from which it bears its name. They tend to be bright green. The sorus is also uncovered and glabrous (free from hair). Hypolepsis ambgigua, which occurs in more lowland areas, can be distinguished from H. millefolium by its wider ultimate segments, which are more than 1mm wide, whereas in H. millefolium they are smaller. In Hiya distans, the distal pinnae are at right angles from the rachis, and not at an acute angle; the stipe is also thicker.

Deciduous in winter.

== Range ==
Hypolepis millefolium is known from all three of the main islands of New Zealand, and from the Chatham Islands, Antipodes Islands, Auckland Islands, and Campbell Island. It is not known from the Kermadecs or the Snares.

This fern ranges from 30m to 1500m in altitude, although mainly above 250m in the North Island. It is known from montane areas.

== Habitat ==
This fern is known from many different types of environment, from grassland to tussockland to swamp margins to forests. It tends to form large rhizomatic colonies. On the Chatham Islands it is known to grow in peat bogs.

== Ecology ==
The fern is used as a food source for takahē in winter. It is also browsed by deer.

== Etymology ==
Mille means 'thousand' in Latin, and folium means 'leaf'. The Latin name is very similar to the vernacular English name.

== Uses ==
It can be used to make a perfume.
