= Hiya (plant) =

Scientific classification
- Kingdom: Plantae
- Clade: Tracheophytes
- Division: Polypodiophyta
- Class: Polypodiopsida
- Order: Polypodiales
- Family: Dennstaedtiaceae
- Genus: Hiya; H.Shang

Type species
- Hiya brooksiae (Alderw.) H.Shang

Genus of ferns

Hiya is a genus of ferns belonging to the family Dennstaedtiaceae. Described in 2018, it resembles ferns of the genus Hypolepis but differs from it by multiple characteristics: scrambling, indeterminate and intermittent growth of fronds; stipule-like pinnules at the base of pinnae, and a rachis-costa architecture where the adaxial sulcus of the rachis is continuous with that of the costae and costules.

The name of the genus references the name given to imperial guards from the Qing dynasty of China, hiya, due to the prickly or very rough armed stipes present in the ferns.

== Classification ==
As of January 2023, the following species are accepted in the genus as currently circumscribed by the Checklist of Ferns and Lycophytes of the World:

- Hiya brooksiae (Alderw.) H.Shang (= Hypolepis brooksiae Alderw. = Hypolepis celebica C. Chr.)
- Hiya distans (Hook.) Brownsey & Perrie (= Hypolepis distans Hook.)
- Hiya nigrescens (Hook.) H.Shang (= Hypolepis nigrescens Hook. = Hypolepis hispanolica Maxon = Dennstaedtia rubicaulis Christ)
- Hiya scabristipes (Brownsey) H.Shang (= Hypolepis scabristipes Brownsey)
