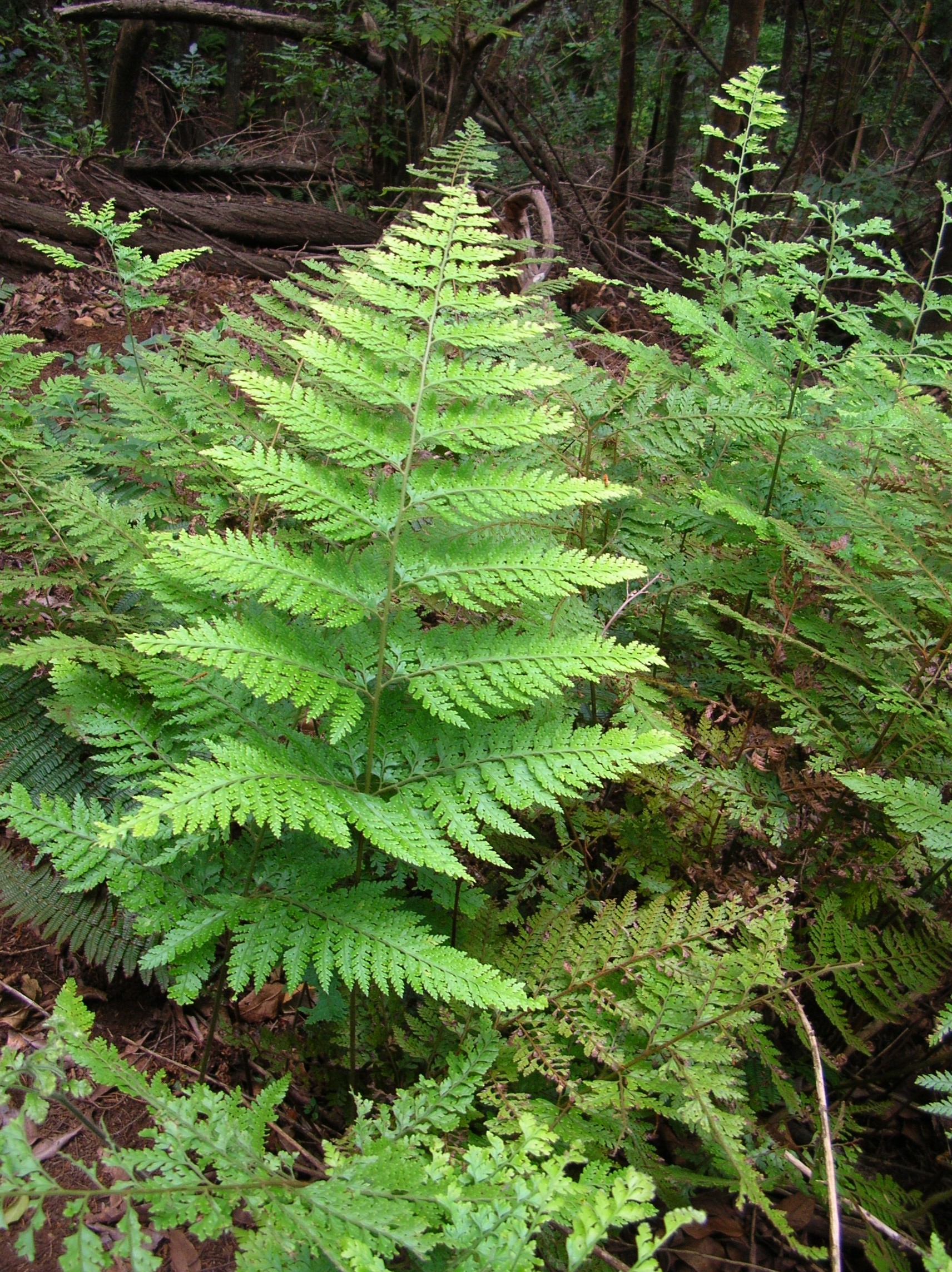
- Microlepia strigosa

Scientific classification
- Kingdom: Plantae
- Clade: Tracheophytes
- Division: Polypodiophyta
- Class: Polypodiopsida
- Order: Polypodiales
- Family: Dennstaedtiaceae
- Genus: Microlepia; C.Presl

Type species
- Microlepia polypodioides (Sw.) C.Presl

= Microlepia =

Genus of ferns

Microlepia is a genus of ferns in the family Dennstaedtiaceae described as a genus in 1836. Most of the species are native to Asia, with many endemic to China, although a few species occur also in Australia, Africa, the West Indies, Latin America, and various oceanic islands.

Species

- Microlepia ampla - Hainan
- Microlepia angustipinna - Yunnan
- Microlepia aspidioides
- Microlepia attenuata - Fujian
- Microlepia calvescens - China, India, Vietnam
- Microlepia caudifolia - Yunnan
- Microlepia caudiformis - Yunnan
- Microlepia caudipinnata - Guangdong
- Microlepia chingii - Hainan
- Microlepia chrysocarpa - Chongqing, Guangxi, Guizhou, Hunan
- Microlepia communis - Yunnan
- Microlepia crassa - Yunnan
- Microlepia crenata - Yunnan
- Microlepia crenatoserrata - Yunnan
- Microlepia critica - Guangxi
- Microlepia firma - Sichuan, Tibet, Yunnan, Bhutan, India, Myanmar, Nepal, Sri Lanka, Thailand
- Microlepia flaccida - Australia
- Microlepia formosana - Taiwan
- Microlepia fujianensis - Fujian
- Microlepia ganlanbaensis - Yunnan
- Microlepia gigantea - Yunnan
- Microlepia glabra - Sichuan
- Microlepia hainanensis - Hainan
- Microlepia hancei - China, Bhutan, India, Japan, Ryukyu Islands, Nepal, Vietnam
- Microlepia herbacea - Vietnam
- Microlepia hirsuta - Luzon
- Microlepia hispida - Yunnan, Vietnam
- Microlepia hookeriana - China, Borneo, N India, Indonesia, Ryukyu Islands, Malaysia, Nepal, Vietnam
- Microlepia intermedia - Guangxi
- Microlepia jamaicensis - Cuba, Jamaica
- Microlepia japonica - Japan
- Microlepia kansuensis - Gansu
- Microlepia khasiyana - India, Myanmar, Nepal, Tibet, China
- Microlepia kurzii - Yunnan, Myanmar, Thailand
- Microlepia kwangtungensis - Guangdong
- Microlepia lofoushanensis - Guangdong
- Microlepia longipilosa - Yunnan
- Microlepia madagascariensis - Madagascar
- Microlepia marginalis - India
- Microlepia marginata - China, India, Indonesia, Japan, Nepal, Papua New Guinea, Sri Lanka, Thailand, Vietnam
- Microlepia matthewii - Guangdong, Guangxi, Hunan, Vietnam
- Microlepia medogensis - Tibet
- Microlepia membranacea - Guangdong, Hunan
- Microlepia modesta - Anhui, Jiangxi, Zhejiang
- Microlepia mollifolia - Taiwan
- Microlepia neostrigosa - Yunnan
- Microlepia obtusiloba - Guangdong, Guangxi, Guizhou, Hainan, Taiwan, Yunnan, Vietnam
- Microlepia omeiensis - Sichuan
- Microlepia pallida - Guangdong, Guangxi
- Microlepia paucipinnata - Guangdong
- Microlepia phanerophlebia - Vietnam
- Microlepia pilosissima - Yunnan
- Microlepia pingpienensis - Yunnan
- Microlepia pinnata - SE Asia, India, Taiwan, New Guinea
- Microlepia platyphylla - S China, Himalayas, India, Sri Lanka, Indochina, Philippines
- Microlepia polypodioides - Himalayas
- Microlepia pseudostrigosa - Japan, Vietnam, China
- Microlepia puberula - Thailand, Borneo
- Microlepia rhomboidea - China, Himalayas, SE Asia
- Microlepia scabra - Himalayas
- Microlepia scyphoformis - Hainan
- Microlepia setosa - Japan
- Microlepia singpienensis - Yunnan
- Microlepia sinostrigosa - Sichuan
- Microlepia speluncae - SE Asia, S China, Indian Subcontinent, Australia, Africa, West Indies, Brazil, Polynesia--
- Microlepia straminea - Yunnan
- Microlepia strigosa - SE Asia, S China, Pacific Islands
- Microlepia subrhomboidea - Yunnan
- Microlepia subspeluncae - Yunnan
- Microlepia substrigosa - Taiwan, Japan
- Microlepia subtrichosticha - Hainan
- Microlepia szechuanica - Sichuan
- Microlepia taiwaniana - Taiwan
- Microlepia tenella - Guangxi, Guizhou, Taiwan, Yunnan
- Microlepia todayensis - SE Asia, S China
- Microlepia trapeziformis - SE Asia, S China, India
- Microlepia trichocarpa - China, Nepal, Darjeeling
- Microlepia trichoclada - Yunnan
- Microlepia trichosora - Yunnan
- Microlepia tripinnata - Yunnan
- Microlepia villosa - Nepal
- Microlepia wentongensis - Guangdong
- Microlepia yunnanensis - Yunnan
