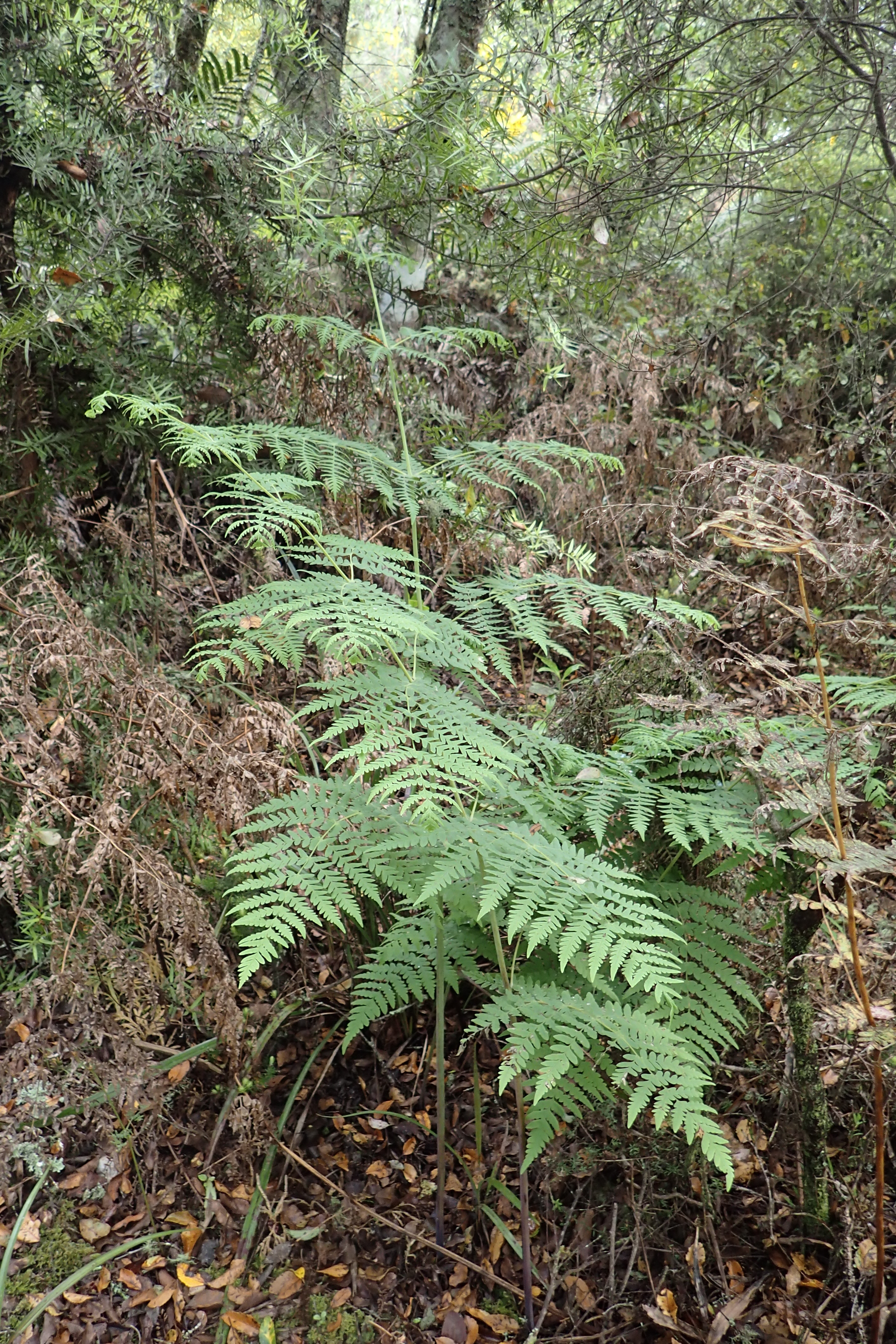
- Histiopteris incisa

Scientific classification
- Kingdom: Plantae
- Clade: Tracheophytes
- Division: Polypodiophyta
- Class: Polypodiopsida
- Order: Polypodiales
- Family: Dennstaedtiaceae
- Genus: Histiopteris (J.Agardh) J.Sm.

Type species
- Pteris vespertilionis Labill.

Species
- See text

Synonyms
- Pteris sect. Histiopteris J.Agardh 1839

= Histiopteris =

Genus of ferns

Histiopteris is a genus of ferns in the family Dennstaedtiaceae described as a genus in 1875.

The following species are accepted in the genus Histiopteris:

- Histiopteris alte-alpina Alderw.
- Histiopteris caudata (Copel.) Holttum
- Histiopteris conspicua Alderw.
- Histiopteris estipulata Alderw.
- Histiopteris hennipmanii Hovenkamp
- Histiopteris herbacea Copel.
- Histiopteris incisa (Thunb.) J.Sm. - Common name: batwing fern, is widespread across tropical and subtropical Asia, Australia, Africa, Latin America, and various oceanic islands.
- Histiopteris pilosa Holttum
- Histiopteris reniformis Alderw.
- Histiopteris sinuata (Brack.) J.Sm.
- Histiopteris squamulata Holttum
- Histiopteris stipulacea (Hook.) Copel.
