= Magnolia henryi =

Henry's magnolia

Conservation status
- Data Deficient (IUCN 3.1)

Scientific classification
- Kingdom: Plantae
- Clade: Embryophytes
- Clade: Tracheophytes
- Clade: Spermatophytes
- Clade: Angiosperms
- Clade: Magnoliids
- Order: Magnoliales
- Family: Magnoliaceae
- Genus: Magnolia
- Subgenus: Magnolia subg. Magnolia
- Section: Magnolia sect. Gwillimia
- Subsection: Magnolia subsect. Gwillimia
- Species: M. henryi

Binomial name
- Magnolia henryi Dunn

Species of flowering plant

Magnolia henryi is a species of flowering plant in the family Magnoliaceae. It is a tree native to Laos, Myanmar, Thailand, and southwestern Yunnan Province in southern China. It is threatened by habitat loss.
