= Sindechites =

Scientific classification
- Kingdom: Plantae
- Clade: Tracheophytes
- Clade: Angiosperms
- Clade: Eudicots
- Clade: Asterids
- Order: Gentianales
- Family: Apocynaceae
- Subfamily: Apocynoideae
- Tribe: Apocyneae
- Genus: Sindechites; Oliv.

Genus of plants

Sindechites is a genus of flowering plants in the family Apocynaceae, first described as a genus in 1888. It is native to southern China, Laos, and Thailand.

Species

- Sindechites chinensis (Merr.) Markgr. & Tsiang - Hainan, Laos, Thailand
- Sindechites henryi Oliv. - Guangxi, Guizhou, Hubei, Hunan, Jiangxi, Sichuan, Yunnan, Zhejiang
