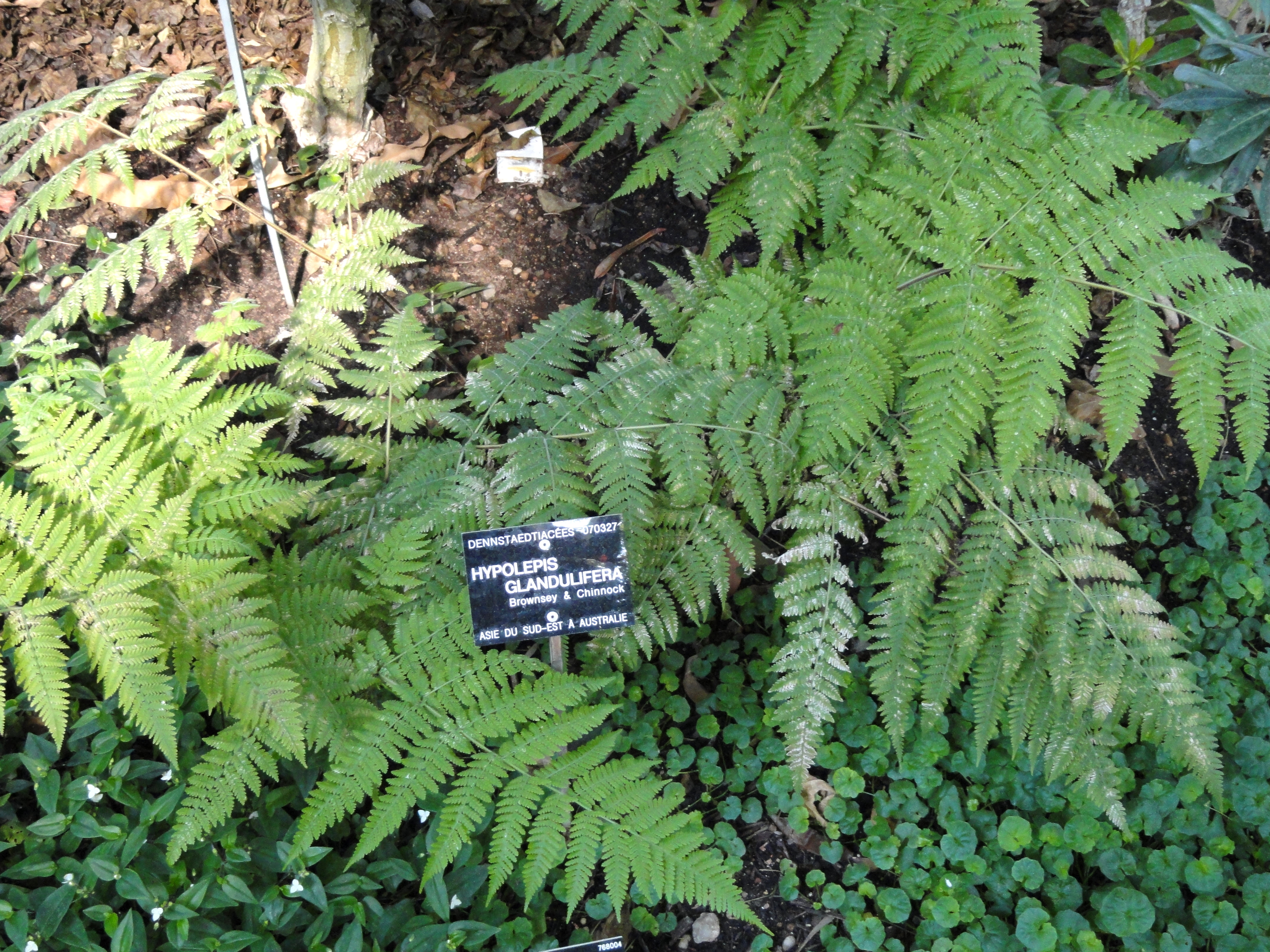
- Hypolepis glandulifera

Scientific classification
- Kingdom: Plantae
- Clade: Tracheophytes
- Division: Polypodiophyta
- Class: Polypodiopsida
- Order: Polypodiales
- Family: Dennstaedtiaceae
- Genus: Hypolepis; Bernh. 1806, not Pers. 1807 (Rafflesiaceae) nor P.Beauv. ex T.Lestib. 1819 (syn of Ficinia in Cyperaceae) nor Nees 1829 (Poaceae)

= Hypolepis (plant) =

Genus of ferns

Hypolepis (beadfern) is a genus of ferns described as a genus in 1806. The word is derived from Greek, meaning "under scale". It is found in tropical and subtropical regions, primarily in the New World but also in the Old World and on various oceanic islands.

== List of species ==
As of January 2023, the following species are accepted in the genus as currently circumscribed by the Checklist of Ferns and Lycophytes of the World:

- Hypolepis acantha Schwartsb.
- Hypolepis amaurorachis (Kunze) Hook.
- Hypolepis ambigua (A.Rich.) Brownsey & Chinnock
- Hypolepis aspidioides Christ
- Hypolepis bamleriana Rosenst.
- Hypolepis barringtonii Schwartsb.
- Hypolepis blepharochlaena Mickel & Beitel
- Hypolepis bogotensis H.Karst. ex Mett.
- Hypolepis crassa Maxon
- Hypolepis cubensis Schwartsb.
- Hypolepis dicksonioides (Bory) Hook.
- Hypolepis ditrichomatis R.C.Moran
- Hypolepis ekmanii Maxon
- Hypolepis elegans Carruth.
- Hypolepis feeana Schwartsb.
- Hypolepis fimbriata Maxon ex Proctor
- Hypolepis flexuosa Sodiro
- Hypolepis forzzae Schwartsb.
- Hypolepis galapagensis Schwartsb. & J.Prado
- Hypolepis glabrescens Ching
- Hypolepis glandulosopilosa H.G.Zhou & H.Li
- Hypolepis grandis Lellinger
- Hypolepis guianensis Klotzsch
- Hypolepis hawaiiensis Brownsey
- Hypolepis hostilis (Kunze) C.Presl
- Hypolepis jamaicensis Maxon ex Proctor
- Hypolepis javensis (Willd.) comb.ined., currently known as Hypolepis alpina (Blume) Hook.
- Hypolepis krameri Schwartsb., Boudrie & Cremers
- Hypolepis lellingeri A.Rojas
- Hypolepis malesiana Brownsey
- Hypolepis melanochlaena A.R.Sm.
- Hypolepis microchlaena Mickel & Beitel
- Hypolepis millefolium Hook.
- Hypolepis minima M.Kessler & A.R.Sm.
- Hypolepis miodelii Schwartsb.
- Hypolepis mitis Kunze ex Kuhn
- Hypolepis moraniana A.Rojas
- Hypolepis muelleri Wakef.
- Hypolepis muenchii (Christ) Mickel
- Hypolepis nuda Mett. ex Kuhn
- Hypolepis obtusata (C.Presl) Kuhn
- Hypolepis pallida (Blume) Hook.
- Hypolepis parallelogramma (Kunze) C.Presl
- Hypolepis pedropaloensis Schwartsb. & J.Prado
- Hypolepis periculosa Schwartsb.
- Hypolepis poeppigii (Kunze) R.Rodr.
- Hypolepis polypodioides (Blume) Hook.
- Hypolepis pteroides Mett.
- Hypolepis punctata (Thunb. ex Murray) Mett. ex Kuhn
- Hypolepis repens (L.) C.Presl
- Hypolepis resistens (Kunze) Hook.
- Hypolepis rigescens (Kunze) T.Moore
- Hypolepis rugosula (Labill.) J.Sm.
- Hypolepis scandens M.Kessler & A.R.Sm.
- Hypolepis sparsisora (Schrad.) Kuhn
- Hypolepis stolonifera Fée
- Hypolepis stuebelii Hieron.
- Hypolepis sunduei Schwartsb.
- Hypolepis tenera Ching
- Hypolepis tenerrima Maxon
- Hypolepis tenuifolia (G.Forst.) Bernh.
- Hypolepis thysanochlaena Mickel & Beitel
- Hypolepis trichobacilliformis R.C.Moran
- Hypolepis trichochlaena Mickel & Beitel
- Hypolepis trinationalis Schwartsb.
- Hypolepis urbanii Brause
- Hypolepis viscosa (H.Karst.) Mett.
- Hypolepis woodii Schwartsb.
- Hypolepis zimmerae Schwartsb.
- Hypolepis ×glabra H.Karst. ex Schwartsb. & J.Prado
- Hypolepis ×paulistana Schwartsb. & J.Prado
