= Marie Laure Tardieu =

French botanist (1902–1998)

- Born: Marie Laure Jacqueline Blot; 17 November 1902; Mourmelon-le-Grand, France
- Died: 23 March 1998 (aged 95); Paris, France
- Resting place: Cimetière de Villiers-sous-Grez
- Education: University of Paris
- Spouse: Jean Tardieu
- Scientific career
- Fields: Botany
- Workplaces: National Museum of Natural History, France
- Author abbrev. (botany): Tardieu

Marie Laure Tardieu-Blot (French pronunciation: [maʁi lɔʁ taʁdjø blo]; 17 November 1902 in Mourmelon-le-Grand – 23 March 1998 in Paris) was a French pteridologist who worked at the French National Museum of Natural History and is noted for describing over 400 plant species.

== Biography ==
The genus of ferns Blotiella was named in her honor. She was married to the author Jean Tardieu. The standard author abbreviation Tardieu is used to indicate this person as the author when citing a botanical name. She was appointed director of the medical analysis laboratory of the Hanoi hospital in 1928. She joined the phanerogamy laboratory of the National Museum of Natural History in 1932, the same year she became a member of the Botanical Society of France. She was appointed deputy director of the French National Museum of Natural History in 1964. She became director of the laboratory of tropical phanerogamic botany in 1967. She was named honorary director in 1971.
