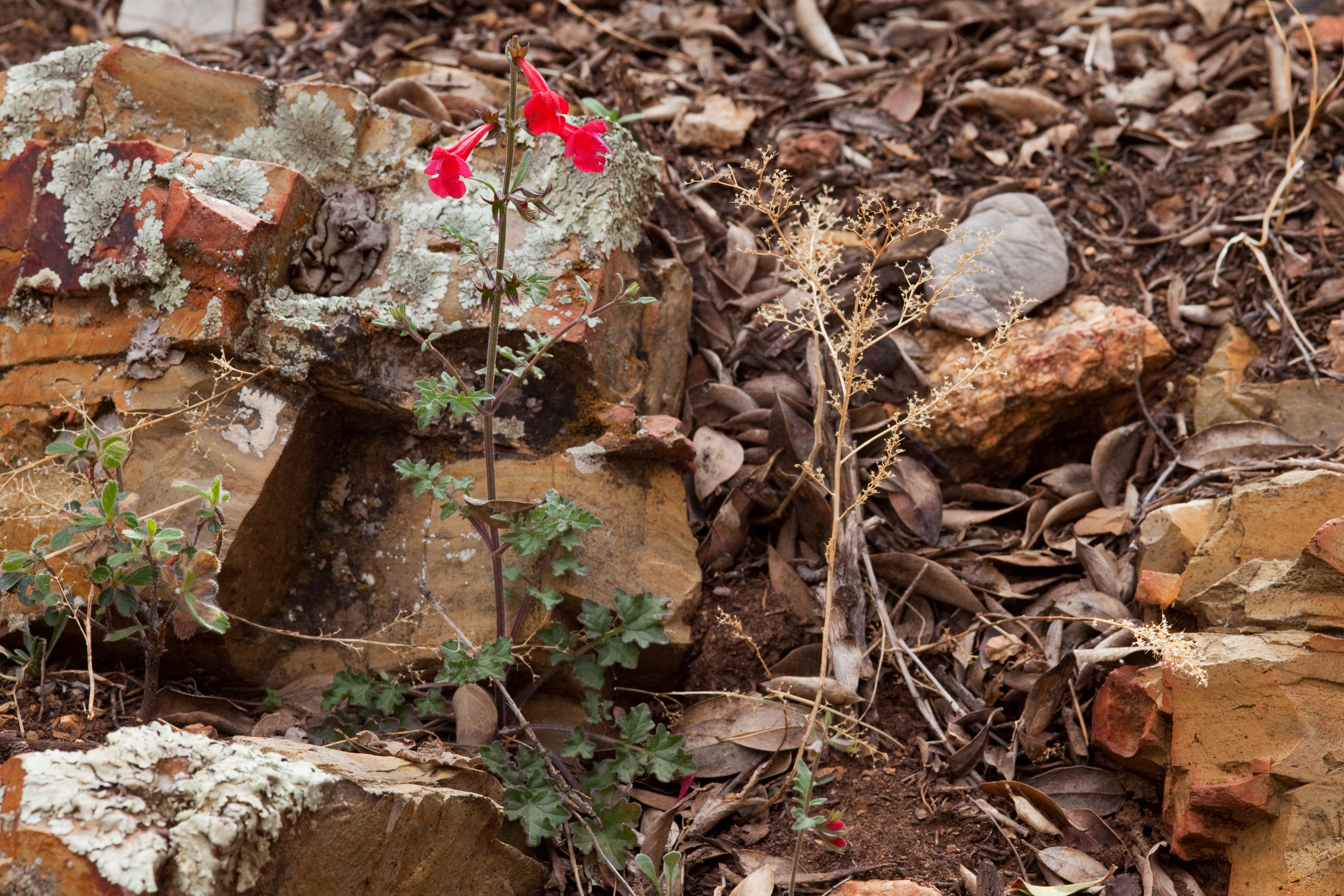

Scientific classification
- Kingdom: Plantae
- Clade: Tracheophytes
- Clade: Angiosperms
- Clade: Eudicots
- Clade: Asterids
- Order: Lamiales
- Family: Lamiaceae
- Genus: Salvia
- Species: S. henryi

Binomial name
- Salvia henryi A.Gray

= Salvia henryi =

Species of flowering plant

Salvia henryi, the crimson sage, is a herbaceous perennial that is native to the U.S. states of Texas, New Mexico, and Nevada, and northern Mexico. It is frequently found growing on rocky slopes and in canyons, along with piñon and juniper. The gray leaves are covered with soft hairs, with bright red bilaterally symmetrical flowers growing in pairs.
