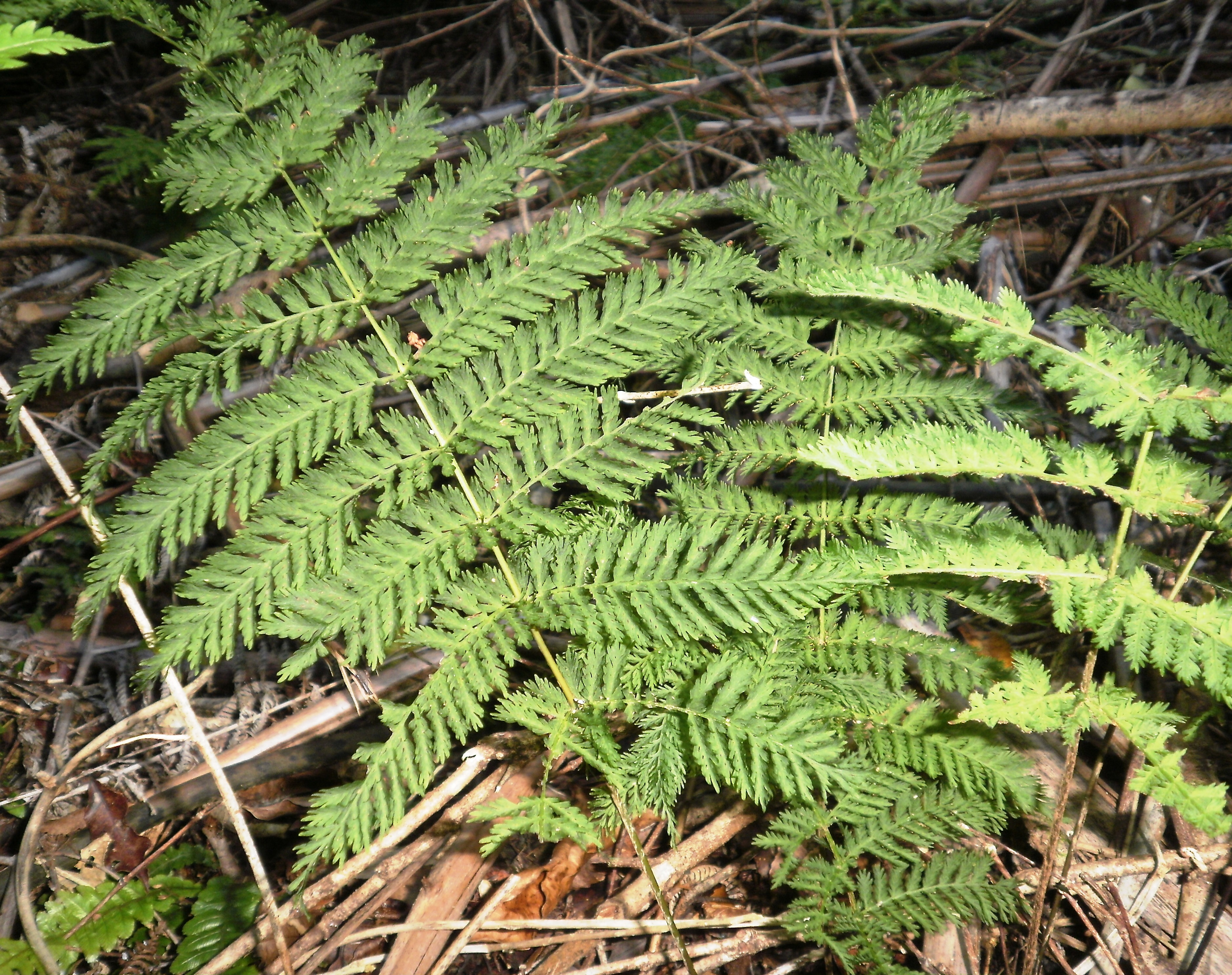

Scientific classification
- Kingdom: Plantae
- Clade: Tracheophytes
- Division: Polypodiophyta
- Class: Polypodiopsida
- Order: Polypodiales
- Family: Dennstaedtiaceae
- Genus: Leptolepia; Prantl
- Species: L. novae-zelandiae

Binomial name
- Leptolepia novae-zelandiae (Colenso) Mett. ex Diels.

Synonyms
- Davallia novae-zelandiae Colenso

= Leptolepia =

Lace fern

Genus of ferns

Leptolepia is a genus of ferns in the family Dennstaedtiaceae described as a genus in 1892.

Leptolepia contains only one accepted species, Leptolepia novae-zelandiae, native to New Zealand.

formerly included

Leptolepia maxima (E. Fourn.) C. Chr., syn of Oenotrichia maxima (E.Fourn.) Copel.

Leptolepia novae-zelandiae is commonly known as lace fern. The fronds of the lace fern are widely spaced, intricate and have a similar texture to lace. Lace fern can grow up to 0.75 metres high and a width of 1.5 metres.
