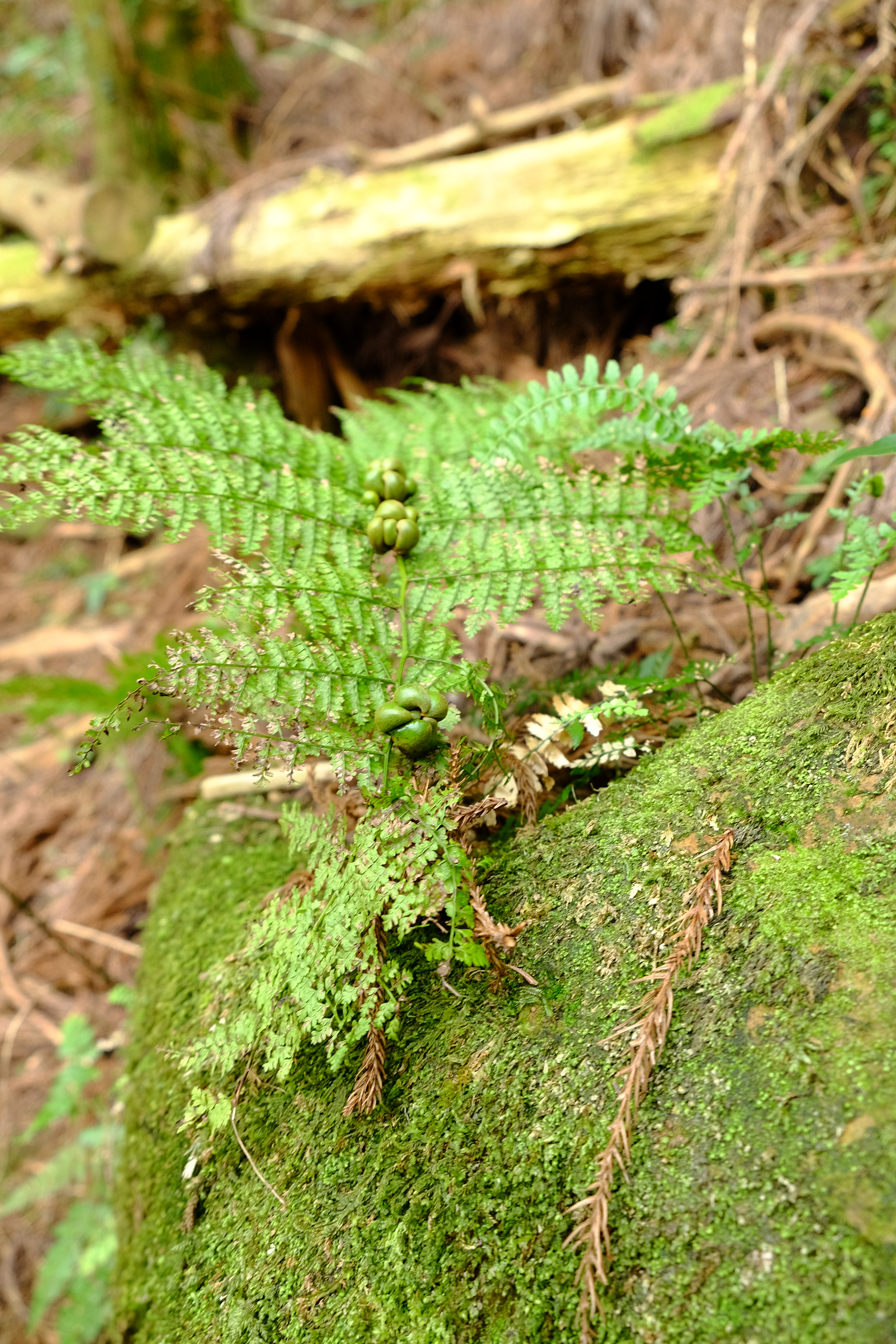
- Monachosorum henryi

Scientific classification
- Kingdom: Plantae
- Clade: Embryophytes
- Clade: Tracheophytes
- Division: Polypodiophyta
- Class: Polypodiopsida
- Order: Polypodiales
- Family: Dennstaedtiaceae
- Genus: Monachosorum; Kunze

Type species
- Monachosorum davallioides Kunze

= Monachosorum =

Genus of plants

Monachosorum is a genus of ferns described as a genus in 1848.

Monachosorum is native to eastern Asia.

Species

Image	Scientific name	Distribution
	Monachosorum x flagellare	(Makino) Hayata - China, Japan
	Monachosorum henryi Christ	China, Bhutan, Assam, Myanmar, Nepal, Vietnam
	Monachosorum maximowiczii	(Baker) Hayata - China, Japan
	Monachosorum nipponicum Makino	China, Japan
	Monachosorum subdigitatum (Blume) Kuhn	Indo-China to New Guinea
