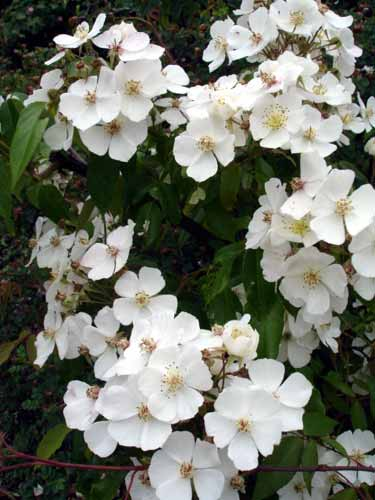

Scientific classification
- Kingdom: Plantae
- Clade: Tracheophytes
- Clade: Angiosperms
- Clade: Eudicots
- Clade: Rosids
- Order: Rosales
- Family: Rosaceae
- Genus: Rosa
- Species: R. henryi

Binomial name
- Rosa henryi Boulenger

= Rosa henryi =

Species of shrub

Rosa henryi is a rose species native to China. It is commonly known as Henry's rose. The species is a climbing shrub, 3–8 m, with long repent branches. Prickles are absent or scattered, curved. Leaves are glabrous or sparsely glandular-pubescent with commonly 5 leaflets. The flowers appear in mid to late summer, 5–15 in an umbel-like corymb, each flower 3–4 cm in diameter, white, and fragrant. The hips are brownish red.

It grows in forest margins, thickets or scrub, valleys or farmland at 1,700–2,000 metres (5,600–6,600 feet).

== Cultivation and uses ==
Rosa henryi is grown as an ornamental plant for its beautiful flowers.
