= Allium henryi =

疏花韭 shu hua jiu

Scientific classification
- Kingdom: Plantae
- Clade: Tracheophytes
- Clade: Angiosperms
- Clade: Monocots
- Order: Asparagales
- Family: Amaryllidaceae
- Subfamily: Allioideae
- Genus: Allium
- Species: A. henryi

Binomial name
- Allium henryi C.H. Wright

Species of plant

Allium henryi is a plant species native to Hubei and Sichuan, China. It grows on hillsides at elevations of 1300–2300 m.

Allium henryi has a clump of cylindrical bulbs, each up to 12 mm across. Scape is up to 25 cm tall. Leaves are flat, narrow, long than the scape. Umbels have a few blue flowers.
