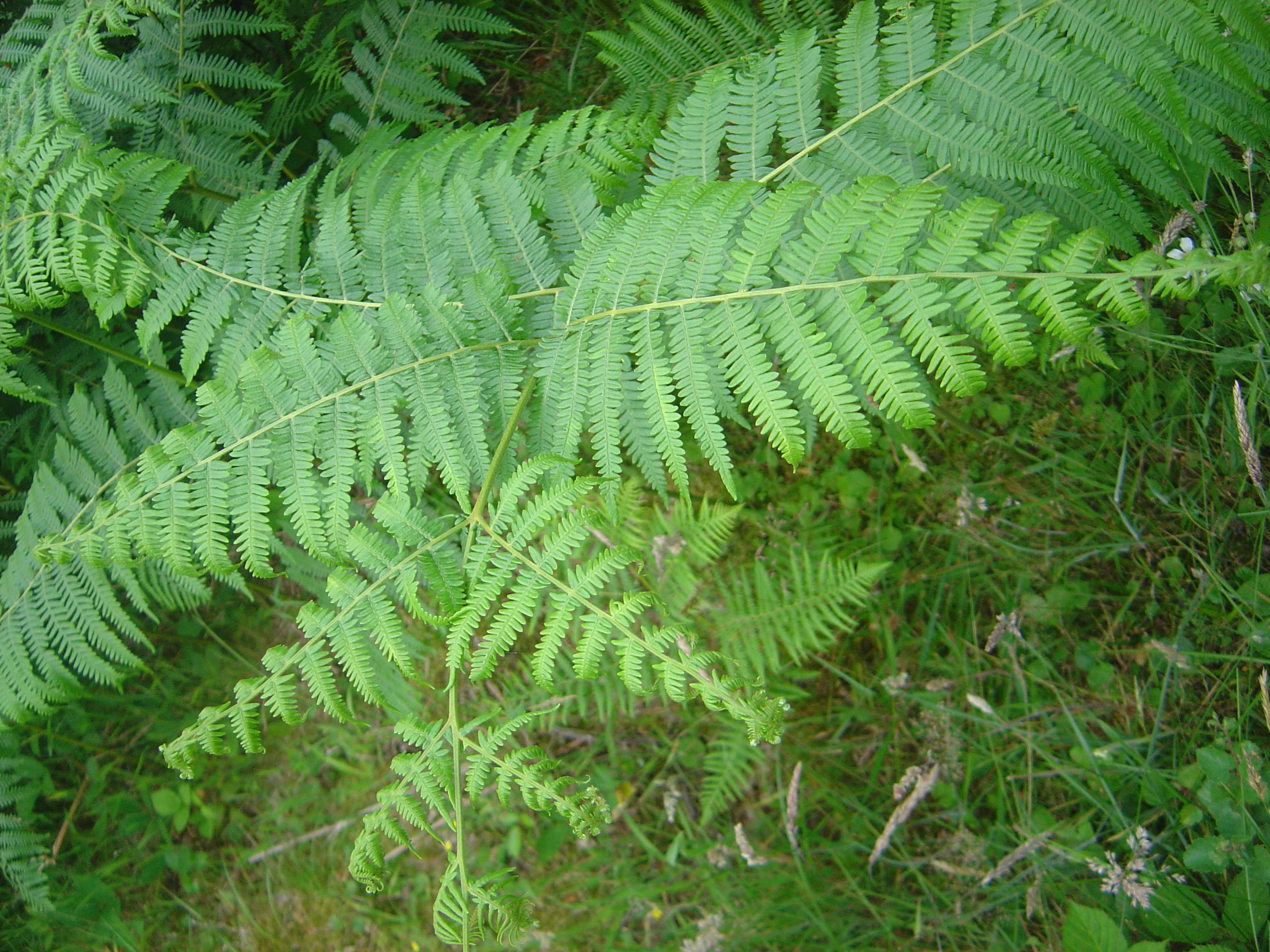
- Pteridium aquilinum

Scientific classification
- Kingdom: Plantae
- Clade: Tracheophytes
- Division: Polypodiophyta
- Class: Polypodiopsida
- Order: Polypodiales
- Suborder: Dennstaedtiineae; Schwarstb. & Hovenkamp
- Family: Dennstaedtiaceae; Lotsy

Genera
- See text

Synonyms
- Hypolepidaceae Pichi-Sermolli 1970; Monachosoraceae Ching 1978; Pteridiaceae Ching 1975

= Dennstaedtiaceae =

Dennstaedtiaceae Temporal range: Late Jurassic–Recent

Family of ferns

Dennstaedtiaceae is one of fifteen families in the order Polypodiales, the most derived families within monilophytes (ferns). It comprises 10 genera with ca 240 known species, including one of the world's most abundant ferns, Pteridium aquilinum (bracken). Members of the order generally have large, highly divided leaves and have either small, round intramarginal sori with cup-shaped indusia (e.g. Dennstaedtia) or linear marginal sori with a false indusium formed from the reflexed leaf margin (e.g. Pteridium). The morphological diversity among members of the order has confused past taxonomy, but recent molecular studies have supported the monophyly of the order and the family. The reclassification of Dennstaedtiaceae and the rest of the monilophytes was published in 2006, so most of the available literature is not updated.

== Distribution of genera ==
Generally, the family is pantropical, but due to the distribution of Pteridium (the most widespread fern genus), Dennstaedtiaceae can be found worldwide. Pteridium is a well adapted early successional genus, generally described as a weed because of its ease of spread. The spore is light and robust, so it can travel relatively far and colonise open, disturbed environments easily. Dennstaedtia is mostly tropical to warm-temperate, but not well represented in the Amazon or Africa. Oenotrichia is in New Caledonia. Leptolepia is in New Zealand, Queensland (Australia), and in New Guinea. Microlepia is in the Asiatic-Pacific. Paesia occurs in tropical America, Asia, and the western Pacific. Hypolepis is tropical and south-temperate. Blotiella is strongly centered in Africa. Histiopteris is generally Malesian, with one pantropic to south-temperate species. The extinct genus Krameropteris is known from remains found in Cenomanian aged Burmese amber. Some older fossils are known from the Jurassic of Eastern India .

== Classification ==
Dennstaedtiaceae was previously considered the only family in the order Dennstaedtiales. Dennstaedtiaceae now contains the previously defined families Monachosoraceae Ching, Pteridiaceae Ching, and Hypolepidaceae Pic. Serm. Before Smith's classification in 2006, Dennstaedtiaceae was a poly- and para- phyletic family, containing genera that now are classified within Lindsaeaceae and Saccolomataceae, and with the family Monachosoraceae arising from within the Dennstaedtiaceae clade. The nonmonophyletic nature of Dennstaedtiaceae (pre-2006 classification) was proved and supported by multiple molecular studies. Dennstaedtiaceae as now classified is supported as monophyletic, but the relation of the genera within the family have not yet been fully clarified.

== Phylogeny ==
Phylogeny of Dennstaedtiaceae

- - Monachosoroideae
    Monachosorum Kunze 1848
  - Dennstaedtioideae
    - Microlepieae
      - - - - Leptolepia Mettenius ex Kuhn 1882
            - Oenotrichia Copeland 1929
          - Paradennstaedtia Tagawa 1952
        - Dennstaedtia Moore 1859 non Bernhardi 1801
      - - Mucura Triana & Sundue 2023
        - - Sitobolium Desvaux 1827
          - Microlepia Presl 1836
    - Hypolepideae
      - Pteridium Gleditsch ex Scopoli 1760 nom. cons. non Rafinesque 1814
      - - - Paesia Saint-Hilaire 1833
          - - Hiya Shang 2018
            - - Histiopteris (Agardh 1839) Smith 1875
              - Blotiella Tryon 1962
        - Hypolepis Bernhardi 1805 non Palisot de Beauvois ex T. Lestib. 1819 non Nees 1829 non Pers. 1807

== Uses ==
Dennsteadtiaceae species and genera are usually known for their weedy nature (i.e. Pteridium spp., Hypolepis spp., Paesia spp.), but some species are grown ornamentally (Blotiella spp., Dennstaedtia spp., Hypolepis spp., Microlepia spp.).

The fiddleheads/crosiers of Pteridium aquilinum have been known to be eaten, but they contain carcinogens, so this practice is not prevalent.

The rhizomes of Pteridium esculentum were consumed by the Maori during their settlement of New Zealand in the 13th century, but no longer are a part of the Maori diet. The rhizomes of Pteridium esculentum contain about 50% starch when they grow in loose rich soil, at relatively deep depths. The rhizomes were a staple in the diet because once dried, the rhizomes were very light (perfect for travelling) and would keep for about a year as long as they remained dry. The leaves and spores of the Pteridium esculentum are associated with toxins and carcinogens, and have been known to cause stock (cattle, sheep, horses, pigs) to sicken.
