= 2021 in paleobotany =

This article records new taxa of fossil plants described during the year 2021, as well as other significant discoveries and events related to paleobotany that occurred in 2021.

== Ferns and fern allies ==
Name	Novelty	Status	Authors	Age	Type locality	Location	Notes	Images
Arthropitys buritiranensis	Sp. nov	In press	Neregato et al.	Permian	Motuca Formation	Brazil	A member of Calamitales.	
Azolla andreisii	Sp. nov	In press	De Benedetti et al.	Late Cretaceous (Maastrichtian)	La Colonia Formation	Argentina	A species of Azolla.	
Caulopteris ellipticus	Sp. nov	In press	Wang et al.	Early Permian	Taiyuan Formation	China	A marattialean tree fern belonging to the family Psaroniaceae.	
Caulopteris neimengensis	Sp. nov	In press	Wang et al.	Early Permian	Taiyuan Formation	China	A marattialean tree fern belonging to the family Psaroniaceae.	
Caulopteris obovatus	Sp. nov	In press	Wang et al.	Early Permian	Taiyuan Formation	China	A marattialean tree fern belonging to the family Psaroniaceae.	
Cicatricosisporites pseudograndiosus	Sp. nov	Valid	D'Apolito, Jaramillo & Harrington	Miocene	Solimões Formation	Brazil	Spores of a member of the genus Ceratopteris.	
Cladarastega	Gen. et sp. nov	Valid	Poinar	Late Cretaceous (Cenomanian)	Burmese amber	Myanmar	A fern belonging to the family Dennstaedtiaceae. Genus includes new species C. burmanica.	
Claytosmunda zhangii	Sp. nov	In press	Tian, Wang & Jiang	Late Jurassic	Tiaojishan Formation	China	A fern, a species of Claytosmunda.	
Dennstaedtia christophelii	Sp. nov	Valid	Pigg et al.	Early Eocene	Klondike Mountain Formation	United States (Washington)	A fern, a species of Dennstaedtia.	Dennstaedtia christophelii
Echinosporis densiechinatus	Sp. nov	Valid	D'Apolito, Jaramillo & Harrington	Miocene	Solimões Formation	Brazil	Spores of a member of the family Marattiaceae.	
Eoangiopteris congestus	Sp. nov	Valid	Sun et al.	Early Permian	Taiyuan Formation	China	A fern belonging to the group Marattiales.	
Hymenophyllum axsmithii	Sp. nov	Valid	Pigg et al.	Early Eocene	Klondike Mountain Formation	United States (Washington)	A fern, a species of Hymenophyllum.	
Iberisetum	Gen. et sp. nov	In press	Correia, Šimůnek & Sá	Carboniferous (Gzhelian)	Douro Basin	Portugal	A member of Equisetales. Genus includes new species I. wegeneri.	
Laevigatosporites cultellus	Sp. nov	Valid	D'Apolito, Jaramillo & Harrington	Miocene	Solimões Formation	Brazil	Spores of a member of the family Polypodiaceae.	
Marsileaceaephyllum ciliatum	Sp. nov	In press	Wang et al.	Cretaceous	Burmese amber	Myanmar	A member of the family Marsileaceae.	
Nemejcopteris haiwangii	Sp. nov	In press	Pšenička et al.	Permian (Asselian)	Taiyuan Formation	China	A zygopterid fern.	
Neocalamites iranensis	Sp. nov	Valid	Kustatscher, Mazaheri-Johari & Roghi in Mazaheri-Johari et al.	Late Triassic (Carnian)	Miakuhi Formation	Iran	A member of the family Equisetaceae.	
Odontosoria marekgaltieri	Sp. nov	In press	Pšenička, Sakala & Dašková	Early Miocene	Most Basin	Czech Republic	A species of Odontosoria.	
Oligosporangiopteris	Gen. et sp. nov	In press	Votočková Frojdová et al.	Early Permian	Taiyuan Formation	China	A leptosporangiate fern. Genus includes new species O. zhongxiangii.	
Osmunda zhangpuensis	Sp. nov		Wang & Sun in Wang et al.	Miocene	Fotan Group	China	A fern, a species of Osmunda.	
Patagoniapteris	Gen. et sp. nov	Valid	Gnaedinger & Zavattieri	Late Triassic (Norian–Rhaetian)	Paso Flores Formation	Argentina	A member of the family Dipteridaceae. Genus includes new species P. artabeae.	
Pectinangium xuanweiense	Sp. nov	In press	Zhou et al.	Permian (Lopingian)		China	A fern belonging to the group Marattiales.	
Polypodiisporites densus	Sp. nov	Valid	D'Apolito, Jaramillo & Harrington	Miocene	Solimões Formation	Brazil	Spores of a member of the family Polypodiaceae.	
Polypodiisporites fossulatus	Sp. nov	Valid	D'Apolito, Jaramillo & Harrington	Miocene	Solimões Formation	Brazil	Spores of a member of the family Lomariopsidaceae.	
Psilatriletes marginatus	Sp. nov	Valid	D'Apolito, Jaramillo & Harrington	Miocene	Solimões Formation	Brazil	Spores of a member of the genus Cyathea.	
Qasimia yunnanica	Sp. nov	In press	Guo et al.	Permian (Lopingian)	Xuanwei Formation	China	A fern belonging to the group Marattiales.	
Reticulosporis diversus	Sp. nov	Valid	D'Apolito, Jaramillo & Harrington	Miocene	Solimões Formation	Brazil	Spores of a member of the family Polypodiaceae.	
Rothwellopteris sanjiaoshuensis	Sp. nov	In press	He et al.	Late Permian	Xuanwei Formation	China	A fern belonging to the group Marattiales.	
Sphenophyllum fanwanense	Sp. nov	In press	Huang et al.	Late Devonian		China	A sphenophyllalean equisetid	
Sphenophyllum parvifolium	Sp. nov	In press	Libertín et al.	Early Permian	Taiyuan Formation	China	A sphenophyllalean equisetid	
Tapelrayen	Gen. et sp. nov	In press	Machado et al.	Eocene	Huitrera Formation	Argentina	Fertile remains of a fern comparable with Thelypteridaceae and Dryopteridaceae. Genus includes new species T. helgae.	
Thyrsopteris cyathindusia	Sp. nov	In press	Zhang et al.	Cretaceous	Burmese amber	Myanmar	A tree fern, a species of Thyrsopteris.	
Woodwardia changchangensis	Sp. nov	In press	Naugolnykh & Song in Song et al.	Middle Eocene	Changchang Formation	China	A fern, a species of Woodwardia.	

== Bennettitales ==
Name	Novelty	Status	Authors	Age	Type locality	Location	Notes	Images
Nilssoniopteris jogiana	Sp. nov		Blomenkemper & Abu Hamad in Blomenkemper et al.	Permian (Changhsingian)	Umm Irna Formation	Jordan	A member of Bennettitales.	
Nilssoniopteris shanxiensis	Sp. nov		Bäumer, Backer & Wang in Blomenkemper et al.	Permian (Cisuralian)	Upper Shihhotse Formation	China	A member of Bennettitales.	
Pterophyllum pottii	Sp. nov		Bomfleur & Kerp in Blomenkemper et al.	Permian (Changhsingian)	Umm Irna Formation	Jordan	A member of Bennettitales.	
Weltrichia magna	Sp. nov	Valid	Guzmán-Madrid & Velasco de León	Middle Jurassic (Bajocian)	Zorrillo Formation	Mexico		
Weltrichia xochitetlii	Sp. nov	In press	Lozano-Carmona et al.	Middle Jurassic (Callovian)	Tecomazuchil Formation	Mexico	A member of Bennettitales.	
Williamsonia sanjuanensis	Sp. nov	In press	Lozano-Carmona & Velasco-de León	Middle Jurassic		Mexico		

== Cycadales ==
Name	Novelty	Status	Authors	Age	Type locality	Location	Notes	Images
Becklesia franconica	Sp. nov	In press	Van Konijnenburg-van Cittert et al.	Late Triassic (Rhaetian)	Exter Formation	Germany	A member of Cycadales of uncertain phylogenetic placement.	
Iratinia	Gen. et sp. nov	In press	Spiekermann et al.	Permian (Kungurian)	Irati Formation	Brazil	A cycad-like plant. Genus includes new species I. australis.	

== Ginkgoales ==
Name	Novelty	Status	Authors	Age	Type locality	Location	Notes	Images
Eretmophyllum hamiensis	Sp. nov	In press	Tang et al.	Middle Jurassic	Xishanyao Formation	China		
Ginkgoites villardeseoanii	Sp. nov	In press	Andruchow-Colombo et al.	Late Cretaceous (Maastrichtian)	Lefipán Formation	Argentina		
Ginkgoxylon arcticum	Sp. nov	In press	Afonin & Gromyko	Early Cretaceous		Russia (Arkhangelsk Oblast)	A member of Ginkgoales described on the basis of fossil wood.	
Karkenia irkutensis	Sp. nov	In press	Nosova, Crane & Shi	Middle Jurassic (Aalenian)	Prisayan Formation	Russia		

== Vladimariales ==
Name	Novelty	Status	Authors	Age	Type locality	Location	Notes	Images
Pseudotorellia doludenkoae	Sp. nov	Valid	Nosova, Kostina & Bugdaeva	Late Jurassic–Early Cretaceous (Oxfordian–Berriasian)	Dublikan Formation; Talyndzhan Formation	Russia (Khabarovsk Krai)		
Pseudotorellia irkutensis	Sp. nov	In press	Nosova	Middle Jurassic (Aalenian–Bajocian)	Prisayan Formation	Russia	A Vladimariales foliage species	
Umaltolepis irkutensis	Sp. nov	In press	Nosova	Middle Jurassic (Aalenian–Bajocian)	Prisayan Formation	Russia	A Vladimariales reproducive structure species	

== Conifers ==
=== Araucariaceae ===
Name	Novelty	Status	Authors	Age	Type locality	Location	Notes	Images
Agathoxylon mendezii	Sp. nov	Valid	Del Fueyo et al.	Early Cretaceous (Berriasian–Valanginian)	Springhill Formation	Argentina	An Araucariaceae fossil wood.	
Agathoxylon santanensis	Sp. nov	In press	Dos Santos et al.	Early Cretaceous (Aptian)	Crato Formation	Brazil		
Araucaria violetae	Sp. nov	In press	Batista et al.	Early Cretaceous		Brazil	A species of Araucaria.	

=== Cheirolepidiaceae ===
Name	Novelty	Status	Authors	Age	Type locality	Location	Notes	Images
Brachyoxylon lalongense	Sp. nov	In press	Yang & Li	Early Cretaceous (Berriasian–Barremian)	Duoni Formation	China		
Brachyoxylon patagonicum	Sp. nov	In press	Rombola et al.	Late Cretaceous	Cerro Fortaleza Formation	Argentina	Fossil wood of a member of the family Cheirolepidiaceae.	
Watsoniocladus cunhae	Sp. nov	In press	Kvaček & Mendes	Early Cretaceous (Aptian–Albian)	Almargem Formation	Portugal	A member of the family Cheirolepidiaceae.	

=== Cupressaceae ===
Name	Novelty	Status	Authors	Age	Type locality	Location	Notes	Images
Cupressinoxylon widdringtonioides	Sp. nov	Valid	De Wit & Bamford	Late Cretaceous		South Africa	Fossil wood of a member or a relative of the family Cupressaceae.	
Fokienia tianpingensis	Sp. nov	Valid	Wu & Jin in Wu et al.	Miocene	Erzitang Formation	China	A species of Fokienia.	
Nishidastrobus	Gen. et sp. nov	Valid	Atkinson et al.	Late Cretaceous		Japan	A member of the family Cupressaceae belonging to the subfamily Cunninghamioideae. Genus includes new species N. japonicum.	
Ohanastrobus	Gen. et sp. nov	Valid	Atkinson et al.	Late Cretaceous		Japan	A member of the family Cupressaceae belonging to the subfamily Cunninghamioideae. Genus includes new species O. hokkaidoensis.	
Protaxodioxylon metangulense	Sp. nov	In press	Nhamutole, Bamford & Araújo	Permian (late Capitanian)	K5 Formation	Mozambique	A member of the family Cupressaceae.	
Protaxodioxylon verniersii	Sp. nov	In press	Nhamutole & Bamford in Nhamutole, Bamford & Araújo	Permian (late Capitanian)	K5 Formation	Mozambique	A member of the family Cupressaceae.	
Thujopsoxylon	Gen. et sp. nov	Valid	Dolezych, LePage & Williams	Oligocene (Chattian)	Korlikov Formation	Russia (Tomsk Oblast)	Genus includes new species T. schneiderianum.	

=== Pinaceae ===
Name	Novelty	Status	Authors	Age	Type locality	Location	Notes	Images
Lepidocasus	Gen. et sp. nov	Valid	Herrera et al.	Early Cretaceous (Aptian–Albian)		Mongolia	A member of the family Pinaceae. Genus includes new species L. mellonae.	
Nothotsuga sinogaia	Sp. nov	In press	Ding et al.	Late Miocene		China	A species of Nothotsuga	
Piceoxylon nikitinii	Sp. nov	Valid	Dolezych, LePage & Williams	Oligocene (Chattian)	Korlikov Formation	Russia (Tomsk Oblast)	A Picea relative wood.	
Pinus leptokrempfii	Sp. nov	Valid	Zhang et al.	Early Oligocene		China	A pine.	
Pinus nongyaplongensis	Sp. nov	In press	Grote in Grote & Srisuk	Oligocene-early Miocene		Thailand	A pine.	
Pinus weichangensis	Sp. nov	In press	Li et al.	Early Miocene		China	A pine.	
Schizolepidopsis ediae	Sp. nov	Valid	Matsunaga et al.	Early Cretaceous	Huolinhe Formation; Tevshiin Govi Formation	China; Mongolia	A member or a close relative of the family Pinaceae.	

=== Podocarpaceae ===
Name	Novelty	Status	Authors	Age	Type locality	Location	Notes	Images
Podocarpus yunnanensis	Sp. nov	In press	Wu et al.	Early Pliocene		China	A species of Podocarpus.	
Protophyllocladoxylon hilarioense	Sp. nov	In press	Vallejos Leiz, Crisafulli & Gnaedinger	Late Triassic (Norian–Rhaetian)	Hilario Formation	Argentina	A member of the family Podocarpaceae.	
Protophyllocladoxylon yiwuense	Sp. nov	In press	Gou & Feng in Gou et al.	Middle Jurassic	Xishanyao Formation	China	A conifer of uncertain phylogenetic placement, possibly belonging or related to the family Podocarpaceae.	

=== Other conifers ===
Name	Novelty	Status	Authors	Age	Type locality	Location	Notes	Images
Cargalostrobus	Gen. et sp. nov	Valid	Gomankov	Permian		Russia (Orenburg Oblast)	A member of Pinales belonging to the family Sashiniaceae. Genus includes new species C. demetrii.	
Megaporoxylon sinensis	Sp. nov	In press	Wan et al.	Late Triassic (Carnian–Norian)	Huangshanjie Formation	China	A coniferous trunk.	
Taxus huolingolensis	Sp. nov	In press	Dong et al.	Early Cretaceous	Huolinhe Formation	China	A species of Taxus.	
Voltzia edithae	Sp. nov	Valid	Forte, Kustatscher & Van Konijnenburg-van Cittert	Middle Triassic (Anisian)		Italy	A member of Voltziales.	
Xenoxylon utahense	Sp. nov	In press	Xie & Gee in Xie et al.	Late Jurassic	Morrison Formation	United States (Utah)	Fossil wood of a conifer.	
Zhuotingoxylon	Gen. et sp. nov	In press	Wan et al.	Permian (Changhsingian)	Guodikeng Formation	China	A silicified trunk with coniferous affinities. Genus includes new species Z. liaoi.	

== Flowering plants ==
=== Basal angiosperms ===
Name	Novelty	Status	Authors	Age	Type locality	Location	Notes	Images
Allonymphaea	Nom. nov	Valid	Doweld	Eocene		Egypt	A replacement name for Thiebaudia Chandler (1954).	

=== Unplaced non-eudicots ===
Name	Novelty	Status	Authors	Age	Type locality	Location	Notes	Images
Alcainea	Gen. et sp. nov	Valid	Sender et al.	Early Cretaceous (Albian)	Escucha Formation	Spain	A member of the family Chloranthaceae. Genus includes new species A. eklundiae.	
Todziaphyllum	Gen. et sp. nov	Valid	Sender et al.	Early Cretaceous (Albian)	Escucha Formation	Spain	A member of the family Chloranthaceae. Genus includes new species T. elongatum.	

=== Magnoliids ===
==== Canellales ====
Name	Novelty	Status	Authors	Age	Type locality	Location	Notes	Images
Aristolochia macginitieana	Nom. nov	Valid	Freitas & Doweld	Oligocene		United States (California)	An Aristolochia species; a replacement name for Aristolochia triangularis MacGinitie (1937).	
Cryptocaryoxylon grandoleaceum	Sp. nov	Valid	Akkemik	Middle Miocene	Kesmekaya Volcanics	Turkey	A member of the family Lauraceae.	
Laurus elliptica	Nom. nov	Valid	Winterscheid in Winterscheid & Kvaček	Oligocene		Germany	A species of Laurus; a replacement name for Laurus obovata Weber (1852).	
Rosarioxylon	Gen. et sp. nov	In press	Cevallos-Ferriz, Catharina & Kneller	Late Cretaceous (Campanian)	Rosario Formation	Mexico	A member of the family Lauraceae. Genus includes new species R. bajacaliforniensis.	
Winteroxylon oleiferum	Sp. nov	Valid	Brea et al.	Early Eocene	Huitrera Formation	Argentina	A member of the family Winteraceae.	

=== Monocots ===
==== Alismatid monocots ====
Name	Novelty	Status	Authors	Age	Type locality	Location	Notes	Images
Bognerospadix	Gen. et sp. nov	Valid	Stockey, Hoffman & Rothwell	Paleocene		Canada (Alberta)	A member of the family Araceae. Genus includes new species B. speirsiae.	

==== Lilioid monocots ====
Name	Novelty	Status	Authors	Age	Type locality	Location	Notes	Images
Mirafloris	Gen. et sp. nov	Valid	Poinar	Cretaceous	Burmese amber	Myanmar	A member of the family Liliaceae. Genus includes new species M. burmitis.	

==== Commelinid monocots ====
Name	Novelty	Status	Authors	Age	Type locality	Location	Notes	Images
Arecipites invaginatus	Sp. nov	Valid	D'Apolito, Jaramillo & Harrington	Miocene	Solimões Formation	Brazil	Pollen of a member of the family Arecaceae.	
Arecocaryon	Nom. nov	Valid	Doweld	Eocene	Messel pit	Germany	A member of the family Arecaceae; a replacement name for Friedemannia Collinson, Manchester & Wilde (2012).	
Cyperaceaepollis wesselinghii	Sp. nov	Valid	D'Apolito, Jaramillo & Harrington	Miocene	Solimões Formation	Brazil	Pollen of a member of the family Cyperaceae.	
Eograminis	Gen. et sp. nov	Valid	Poinar & Soreng	Eocene	Baltic amber	Russia (Kaliningrad Oblast)	Grass belonging to the subfamily Arundinoideae. Genus includes new species E. balticus.	
Luminidites amazonicus	Sp. nov	Valid	D'Apolito, Jaramillo & Harrington	Miocene	Solimões Formation	Brazil	Pollen of a member of the family Arecaceae.	
Orthogonospermum	Gen. et sp. nov	Valid	Smith et al.	Late Cretaceous (Maastrichtian)	Deccan Intertrappean Beds	India	A member of the family Zingiberaceae. Genus includes new species O. patanense.	
Sabalites colaniae	Sp. nov	In press	Song, Su, Do & Zhou in Song et al.	Oligocene	Dong Ho Formation	Vietnam	A member of the family Arecaceae belonging to the subfamily Coryphoideae.	
Trichotomosulcites normalis	Sp. nov	Valid	D'Apolito, Jaramillo & Harrington	Miocene	Solimões Formation	Brazil	Pollen of a member of the family Arecaceae.	

===== Commelinid monocot research =====
- A study on the evolutionary history of palms throughout the Cenozoic era, aiming to determine the impact of Cenozoic environmental changes on the diversification and biogeography of palms, is published by Lim et al. (2021).
- Pollens of member of the family Poaceae preserving the same morphological characteristics as that of modern cereal grains are described from a sedimentary core from Lake Acıgöl (Turkey) by Andrieu-Ponel et al. (2021), who interpret this finding as indicative of the presence of proto-cereals in Anatolia since 2.3 million years ago, likely evolving from wild Poaceae as a result of trampling, nitrogen enrichment of soils and browsing by large mammal herds, and evaluate possible benefits from the availability of these proto-cereals for early hominins.

=== Basal eudicots ===
==== Proteales ====
Name	Novelty	Status	Authors	Age	Type locality	Location	Notes	Images
Platanocarpelia	Gen. et sp. nov	Valid	Maslova, Kodrul & Kachkina	Late Cretaceous (Turonian)		Kazakhstan	A member of the family Platanaceae. Genus includes new species P. kyzyljarica.	
Proteacidites pseudodehaanii	Sp. nov	Valid	D'Apolito, Jaramillo & Harrington	Miocene	Solimões Formation	Brazil	Pollen of a member of the family Proteaceae.	

=== Superasterids ===
==== Campanulid euasterids ====
Name	Novelty	Status	Authors	Age	Type locality	Location	Notes	Images
Pittosporum ettingshausenii	Nom. nov	Valid	Doweld	Miocene		New Zealand	A species of Pittosporum; a replacement name for Pittosporum elegans (Ettingshausen) W.R.B. Oliver (1950).	
Xenopanax	Gen. et comb. nov	Valid	Doweld	Eocene		Russia (Kamchatka Krai)	A new genus for "Pittosporum" beringianum Chelebaeva & Akhmetiev (1983).	

==== Lamiid euasterids ====
Name	Novelty	Status	Authors	Age	Type locality	Location	Notes	Images
Adina vastanenesis	Sp. nov	Valid	Shukla et al.	Early Eocene	Cambay Shale Formation	India	A species of Adina.	
Dicolpopollis? costatus	Sp. nov	Valid	D'Apolito, Jaramillo & Harrington	Miocene	Solimões Formation	Brazil	Pollen of a member of the genus Macoubea.	
Dolichandra pacei	Sp. nov	Valid	Franco, Brea & Cerdeño	Miocene (Santacrucian)	Mariño Formation	Argentina	A species of Dolichandra.	
Fraxinoxylon beypazariense	Sp. nov	Valid	Akkemik	Early Miocene	Hançili Formation	Turkey	A member of the family Oleaceae.	
Fraxinus eoemarginata	Sp. nov	In press	Mathewes, Archibald & Lundgren	Early Eocene	Quilchena site	Canada (British Columbia)	A species of Fraxinus.	
Kapgateophyllum	Nom. nov	Valid	Deshmukh	Late Cretaceous (Maastrichtian) - early Eocene	Deccan Intertrappean Beds	India	A member of the family Acanthaceae; a replacement name for Acanthophyllum Ramteke & Kapgate (2014).	
Ladakhipollenites campbellii	Sp. nov	Valid	D'Apolito, Jaramillo & Harrington	Miocene	Solimões Formation	Brazil	Pollen of a member of the genus Vitex.	
Lymingtonia splendida	Sp. nov	Valid	D'Apolito, Jaramillo & Harrington	Miocene	Solimões Formation	Brazil	Pollen of a member of the family Convolvulaceae.	
Maryendressantha	Gen. et sp. nov	Valid	Singh et al.	Early Eocene	Cambay amber	India	A member of the family Apocynaceae. Genus includes new species M. succinifera.	
Perfotricolpites hexacolpatus	Sp. nov	Valid	D'Apolito, Jaramillo & Harrington	Miocene	Solimões Formation	Brazil	Pollen of a member of the genus Merremia.	
Verrustephanoporites intraverrucosus	Sp. nov	Valid	D'Apolito, Jaramillo & Harrington	Miocene	Solimões Formation	Brazil	Pollen of a member of the family Apocynaceae.	

==== Non euasterids ====
Name	Novelty	Status	Authors	Age	Type locality	Location	Notes	Images
Anacolosidites reticulatus	Sp. nov	In press	Morley, Huang & Hoorn in Huang et al.	Middle and late Eocene	Yaw Formation		Pollen probably derived from plants belonging to the genus Ptychopetalum.	
Camptotheca manchesterii	Sp. nov	In press	Xie et al.	Late Miocene	Bangmai Formation	China	A species of Camptotheca.	
Diospyros christensenii	Sp. nov	Valid	Denk & Bouchal	Miocene		Denmark	A species of Diospyros.	
Halesia mosbruggeri	Sp. nov	Valid	Kvaček	Early Miocene	Most Basin	Czech Republic	A species of Halesia.	
Loranthacites tabatingensis	Sp. nov	Valid	D'Apolito, Jaramillo & Harrington	Miocene	Solimões Formation	Brazil	Pollen of a member of the genus Struthanthus.	
Mecsekispermum	Gen. et sp. nov	Valid	Hably & Erdei	Miocene (Burdigalian)	Feked Formation	Hungary	Possibly a member of the family Theaceae. Genus includes new species M. gordonioides.	
Miranthus	Gen. et 2 sp. nov	Valid	Friis, Crane	Late Cretaceous (Campanian-Maastrichtian)		Portugal	A Primulaceae genus. Genus includes new species M. elegans and M. kvacekii.	
Nyssa nanningensis	Sp. nov	In press	Xu & Jin in Xu et al.	Late Oligocene	Yongning Formation	China	A tupelo.	
Paranyssa	Nom. nov	Valid	Doweld	Paleocene		United States (Montana)	A member of the family Nyssaceae; a replacement name for Browniea Manchester & Hickey (2007).	
Parsonsidites? minibrenacii	Sp. nov	Valid	D'Apolito, Jaramillo & Harrington	Miocene	Solimões Formation	Brazil	Pollen of a member of the family Amaranthaceae.	
Ternstroemites klettwitzensis	Sp. nov	Valid	Striegler	Miocene (Tortonian)	Rauno Formation	Germany	A member of the family Theaceae.	

=== Superrosids ===
==== Fabids ====
===== Fabales =====
Name	Novelty	Status	Authors	Age	Type locality	Location	Notes	Images
Albizia mahuadanrensis	Sp. nov	In press	Hazra, Hazra & Khan in Hazra et al.	Pliocene	Rajdanda Formation	India	A species of Albizia.	
Albizia palaeoprocera	Sp. nov	In press	Hazra, Hazra & Khan in Hazra et al.	Pliocene	Rajdanda Formation	India	A species of Albizia.	
Cercis zhangpuensis	Sp. nov	In press	Wang et al.	Miocene	Fotan Group	China	A species of Cercis.	
Cladrastis haominiae	Sp. nov	In press	Jia et al.	Paleogene		China	A species of Cladrastis.	
Enterolobiumoxylon	Gen. et sp. nov	In press	Pérez-Lara, Estrada-Ruiz & Castañeda-Posadas	Eocene	El Bosque Formation	Mexico	Fossil wood of a member of the family Fabaceae. Genus includes new species E. triserial.	
Gleditsioxylon fiambalense	Sp. nov	In press	Baez	Miocene	Tambería Formation	Argentina	A member of Leguminosae.	
Kingiodendron mexicanus	Sp. nov	In press	Pérez-Lara, Estrada-Ruiz & Castañeda-Posadas	Eocene	El Bosque Formation	Mexico	Fossil wood of a member of the family Fabaceae.	
Ladakhipollenites? pseudocolpiconstrictus	Sp. nov	Valid	D'Apolito, Jaramillo & Harrington	Miocene	Solimões Formation	Brazil	Pollen of a member of the family Fabaceae.	
Leguminocarpum lottii	Sp. nov	Valid	Li & Manchester in Li et al.	Early Eocene	Tepee Trail Formation	United States (Wyoming)	A member of the family Fabaceae.	
Leguminocarpum olmensis	Sp. nov	Valid	Centeno-González et al.	Late Cretaceous (Campanian)	Olmos Formation	Mexico	A member of the family Fabaceae.	
Neopapilionia	Gen. et sp. nov	Valid	Hazra, Hazra & Khan in Hazra et al.	Pliocene	Rajdanda Formation	India	A member of the family Fabaceae. Genus includes new species N. indica.	
Ormosia cyclocarpa	Sp. nov	In press	Li et al.	Miocene		China	A species of Ormosia.	
Peltophorum asiatica	Sp. nov	In press	Hazra, Hazra & Khan in Hazra et al.	Pliocene	Rajdanda Formation	India	A species of Peltophorum.	
Polyadopollenites minimus	Sp. nov	Valid	D'Apolito, Jaramillo & Harrington	Miocene	Solimões Formation	Brazil	Pollen of a member of the genus Mimosa.	
Salpinganthium	Gen. et sp. nov	Valid	Poinar & Chambers	Burdigalian	Dominican amber	Dominican Republic	A member of the family Fabaceae belonging to the tribe Detarieae. Genus includes new species S. hispaniolanum.	
Striatopollis crassitectatus	Sp. nov	Valid	D'Apolito, Jaramillo & Harrington	Miocene	Solimões Formation	Brazil	Pollen of a member of the genus Macrolobium.	
Syncolporites foveolatus	Sp. nov	Valid	D'Apolito, Jaramillo & Harrington	Miocene	Solimões Formation	Brazil	Pollen of a member of the genus Swartzia.	

===== Fagales =====
Name	Novelty	Status	Authors	Age	Type locality	Location	Notes	Images
Eucarpinoxylon kayacikii	Sp. nov	Valid	Akkemik	Middle Miocene	Kesmekaya Volcanics	Turkey	A member of the family Betulaceae.	
Fagus dodgei	Sp nov	Valid	Wheeler & Manchester	Late Eocene	John Day Formation	USA; Oregon	A Fagus species wood.	
Lithocarpoxylon ashwillii	Sp nov	Valid	Wheeler & Manchester	Late Eocene	John Day Formation	USA; Oregon	A Lithocarpoxylon species wood.	
Morella absarokensis	Comb nov	valid	(Wheeler, Scott, & Barghoorn) Wheeler & Manchester	Middle Eocene	Lamar River Formation	USA; Wyoming	Moved from Myrica absarokensis (1978)	
Morella scalariformis	Comb nov	valid	(Kruse) Wheeler, Baas, & Manchester	Middle Eocene	Eden Valley Formation	USA; Wyoming	Moved from Myrica scalariformis (1954)	
Myricamentum	Gen. et sp. nov	Valid	Wilde, Frankenhäuser & Lenz	Eocene	Eckfelder Maar	Germany	A catkin-like male inflorescence, probably of myricaceous affinity. Genus includes new species M. eckfeldensis.	
Ostryoxylon gokceadaense	Sp. nov	Valid	Akkemik	Middle Miocene	Kesmekaya Volcanics	Turkey	A member of the family Betulaceae.	
Palaeocarpinus borealis	Comb nov	Valid	(Heer) Correa & Manchester	Paleocene late Paleocene	Menat Formation	France; Puy-de-Dôme	A Coryloideae species. First described as Anchietea borealis (1859). Moved from Atriplex borealis (1912)	
Palaeocarpinus parva	Sp. nov	Valid	Manchester & Correa	Middle Eocene	Clarno Formation	USA; Oregon	A Coryloideae species.	
Palaeocarpinus pterabaratra	Sp. nov	Valid	Correa & Manchester	Paleocene; Middle Paleocene	Fort Union Formation "unnamed lower member"	USA; Wyoming	A Coryloideae species.	
Palaeocarpinus pteravestigia	Sp. nov	Valid	Correa & Manchester	Paleocene; Middle Paleocene	Fort Union Formation "unnamed lower member"	USA; Wyoming	A Coryloideae species.	
Palaeocarya indica	Sp. nov	Valid	Hazra, Hazra & Khan in Hazra et al.	Pliocene	Rajdanda Formation	India	A member of the family Juglandaceae.	
Paralnoxylon	Nom. nov	Valid	Doweld	Paleocene		United Kingdom	A member of the family Betulaceae; a replacement name for Cantia Stopes (1915).	
Quercoxylon yaltirikii	Sp. nov	Valid	Akkemik	Early Miocene	Hançili Formation	Turkey	A member of the family Fagaceae.	

====== Fagalean research ======
- A study on wood anatomy in extant and fossil members of Fagales is published by Wheeler, Baas & Manchester who transfer two Eocene species from Myrica to Morella.

===== Malpighiales =====
Name	Novelty	Status	Authors	Age	Type locality	Location	Notes	Images
Euphorbiotheca deccanensis	Sp. nov	In press	Reback et al.	Late Cretaceous (Maastrichtian)	Deccan Intertrappean Beds	India	A member of the family Euphorbiaceae.	
Passiflora appalachiana	Sp. nov	Valid	Hermsen	Pliocene	Gray Fossil Site	United States (Tennessee)	A species of Passiflora.	
Passifloriidites	Gen. et sp. nov	Valid	D'Apolito, Jaramillo & Harrington	Miocene	Solimões Formation	Brazil	Pollen of a member of the family Passifloraceae. Genus includes new species P. pseudoperculatus.	
Populoxylon sebenense	Sp. nov	Valid	Akkemik	Early Miocene	Hançili Formation	Turkey	A member of the family Salicaceae.	
Salicoxylon galatianum	Sp. nov	Valid	Akkemik	Early Miocene	Hançili Formation	Turkey	A member of the family Salicaceae.	
Verrustephanoporites circularis	Sp. nov	Valid	D'Apolito, Jaramillo & Harrington	Miocene	Solimões Formation	Brazil	Pollen of a member of the genus Mascagnia.	

===== Oxalidales =====
Name	Novelty	Status	Authors	Age	Type locality	Location	Notes	Images
Tropidogyne euthystyla	Sp. nov	Valid	Poinar, Chambers & Vega	Cretaceous	Burmese amber	Myanmar	A possible member of Cunoniaceae.	

===== Rosales =====
Name	Novelty	Status	Authors	Age	Type locality	Location	Notes	Images
Alloceltidoxylon	Nom. nov	Valid	Doweld	Eocene	Clarno Formation	United States (Oregon)	A flowering plant with possible affinities with urticalean rosids; a replacement name for Scottoxylon Wheeler & Manchester (2002).	
Celtis popsii	Sp nov	Valid	Wheeler & Manchester	Late Eocene	John Day Formation	USA; Oregon	A Celtis species wood.	
Crataegoxylon sibiricum	Sp. nov	Valid	Dolezych, LePage & Williams	Oligocene (Chattian)	Korlikov Formation	Russia (Tomsk Oblast)		
Morus asiatica	Sp. nov	In press	Patel, Rana & Khan in Patel et al.	Early Eocene		India	A species of Morus.	
Prunoidoxylon prunoides	Sp. nov	Valid	Akkemik	Early Miocene	Hançili Formation	Turkey	A member of the family Rosaceae.	
Psilatriporites minimus	Sp. nov	Valid	D'Apolito, Jaramillo & Harrington	Miocene	Solimões Formation	Brazil	Pollen of a member of the genus Celtis.	
Pyracantha pseudococcinea	Sp. nov	Valid	Striegler	Miocene (Tortonian)	Rauno Formation	Germany	A species of Pyracantha.	
Ulmoxylon kasapligilii	Sp. nov	Valid	Akkemik	Early Miocene	Hançili Formation	Turkey	A member of the family Ulmaceae.	
Ventilago tibetensis	Sp. nov	Valid	Del Rio et al.	Middle Eocene		China	A species of Ventilago.	
Zelkovoxylon crystalliferum	Sp. nov	Valid	Akkemik	Early Miocene	Hançili Formation	Turkey	A member of the family Ulmaceae.	

==== Malvids ====
===== Malvales =====
Name	Novelty	Status	Authors	Age	Type locality	Location	Notes	Images
Bombacacidites hooghiemstrae	Sp. nov	Valid	D'Apolito, Jaramillo & Harrington	Miocene	Solimões Formation	Brazil	Pollen of a member of the family Malvaceae.	
Craigia lincangensis	Sp. nov	In press	Wang & Xie in Wang et al.	Late Miocene		China	A species of Craigia	
Dipterocapus fotanensis	Sp. nov	Valid	Chen et al.	Miocene		China	A species of Dipterocarpus	
Discoidites angulosus	Sp. nov	In press	Huang, Morley & Hoorn in Huang et al.	Late Eocene	Yaw Formation	Myanmar	Pollen probably derived from plants belonging to the genus Brownlowia.	
Thymelipollis amazonicus	Sp. nov	Valid	D'Apolito, Jaramillo & Harrington	Miocene	Solimões Formation	Brazil	Pollen of a member of the family Thymelaeaceae.	
Tilia asiatica	Sp. nov	In press	Jia & Nam in Jia et al.	Middle Miocene	Pohang Basin	South Korea	A species of Tilia	
Wataria kvacekii	Sp nov	Valid	Wheeler & Manchester	Late Eocene	John Day Formation	USA; Oregon	A Wataria species wood.	

===== Myrtales =====
Name	Novelty	Status	Authors	Age	Type locality	Location	Notes	Images
Florschuetzia impostora	Sp. nov	Valid	D'Apolito, Jaramillo & Harrington	Miocene	Solimões Formation	Brazil	Fossil pollen, possibly of a member of the family Lythraceae.	
Lazarocardenasoxylon	Gen. et sp. nov	In press	Estrada-Ruiz & Martínez-Cabrera in Estrada-Ruiz, Martínez-Cabrera & García-Hernández	Late Cretaceous	San Carlos Formation	Mexico	Possibly a member of the family Myrtaceae. Genus includes new species L. aldamense.	
Lythrum portugalliense	Sp. nov	In press	Vieira et al.	Pliocene (Piacenzian)		Portugal	A species of Lythrum.	
Syzygium guipingensis	Sp. nov	In press	Li et al.	Miocene	Erzitang Formation	China	A species of Syzygium.	
Terminalioxylon mozambicense	Sp. nov	Valid	Bamford & Pickford	Probably late Eocene		Mozambique	A member of the family Combretaceae.	
Trapa sanyingensis	Sp. nov	In press	Aung et al.	Late Pliocene	Sanying Formation	China	A water caltrop.	
Verrutricolporites pusillus	Sp. nov	Valid	D'Apolito, Jaramillo & Harrington	Miocene	Solimões Formation	Brazil	Fossil pollen, possibly of a member of the family Lythraceae.	
Xystonia	Gen. et sp. nov	Valid	Carvalho et al.	Paleocene	Bogotá Formation	Colombia	A member of the family Melastomataceae. Genus includes new species X. simonae.	

===== Sapindales =====
Name	Novelty	Status	Authors	Age	Type locality	Location	Notes	Images
Aceroxylon aceroides	Sp. nov	Valid	Akkemik	Early Miocene	Hançili Formation	Turkey	A member of the family Sapindaceae.	
Ampelorhiza	Gen. et sp. nov	Valid	Jud et al.	Early Miocene	Cucaracha Formation	Panama	A member of the family Sapindaceae belonging to the subfamily Sapindoideae and the tribe Paullinieae. Genus includes new species A. heteroxylon.	
Anacardium gassonii	Sp. nov	Valid	Rodríguez-Reyes, Estrada-Ruiz & Terrazas in Rodríguez-Reyes et al.	Oligocene-Miocene		Panama	A species of Anacardium.	
Atalantioxylon thanobolensis	Sp. nov	Valid	Soomro et al.	Miocene	Manchar Formation	Pakistan	Fossil wood of a member of the family Rutaceae.	
Melia santangensis	Sp. nov	Valid	Liu, Xu & Jin in Liu et al.	Late Oligocene	Yongning Formation	China	A species of Melia.	
Pistacia terrazasae	Sp nov	Valid	Wheeler & Manchester	Late Eocene	John Day Formation	USA; Oregon	A Pistacia species wood.	
Proteacidites poriscabratus	Sp. nov	Valid	D'Apolito, Jaramillo & Harrington	Miocene	Solimões Formation	Brazil	Pollen of a member of the family Sapindaceae.	
Sorindeioxylon	Gen. et sp. nov	Valid	Bamford & Pickford	Probably late Eocene	Mazamba Formation	Mozambique	A member of the family Anacardiaceae. Genus includes new species S. gorongosense.	
Syncolporites tenuicolpatus	Sp. nov	Valid	D'Apolito, Jaramillo & Harrington	Miocene	Solimões Formation	Brazil	Pollen of a member of the genus Serjania.	
Tetradium nanningense	Sp. nov	Valid	Huang et al.	Late Oligocene	Yongning Formation	China	A species of Tetradium.	
Verrutricolporites simplex	Sp. nov	Valid	D'Apolito, Jaramillo & Harrington	Miocene	Solimões Formation	Brazil	Pollen of a member of the family Simaroubaceae.	

==== Non eurosid superrosids ====
Name	Novelty	Status	Authors	Age	Type locality	Location	Notes	Images
Hamamelidoxylon crystalliferum	Sp nov	Valid	Wheeler & Manchester	Late Eocene	John Day Formation	USA; Oregon	A Hamamelidoxylon species wood.	
Liquidambar guipingensis	Sp. nov	In press	Huang et al.	Miocene	Erzitang Formation	China	A species of Liquidambar.	
Liquidambaroxylon efeae	Sp. nov	Valid	Akkemik	Early Miocene	Hançili Formation	Turkey	A member of the family Altingiaceae.	
Obirafructus	Gen. et sp. nov	Valid	Kajita & Nishida in Kajita, Suzuki & Nishida	Late Cretaceous (Coniacian–Santonian)	Haborogawa Formation	Japan	A member of Saxifragales of uncertain phylogenetic placement. Genus includes new species O. kokubunii.	
Paleoaltingia	Gen. nov	Valid	Lai et al.	Late Cretaceous (Turonian)		United States (New Jersey)	A member of Altingiaceae. Genus includes P. ovum-dinosauri and P. polyodonta.	

=== Other angiosperms ===
Name	Novelty	Status	Authors	Age	Type locality	Location	Notes	Images
Araliaephyllum vittenburgii	Sp. nov	Valid	Golovneva & Volynets in Golovneva et al.	Early Cretaceous (Albian)	Galenki Formation	Russia (Primorsky Krai)	A flowering plant of uncertain phylogenetic placement.	
Baderadea	Gen. et sp. nov	Valid	Pessoa, Ribeiro & Jud	Early Cretaceous (Aptian)	Crato Formation	Brazil	A herbaceous eudicot similar to some members of Ranunculales. Genus includes new species B. pinnatissecta.	
Byttneripollis rugulatus	Sp. nov	Valid	D'Apolito, Jaramillo & Harrington	Miocene	Solimões Formation	Brazil	Fossil pollen.	
Dilcherifructus	Gen. et sp. nov	Valid	Wang	Middle Jurassic	Simón Formation	Mexico	Possibly a fruit of an early flowering plant. Genus includes new species D. mexicana.	
Farabeipollis deccanensis	Sp. nov	Valid	Sonkusare, Samant & Mohabey	Late Cretaceous (Maastrichtian)	Deccan Intertrappean Beds	India	Pollen of a flowering plant of uncertain affinity.	
Florigerminis	Gen. et sp. nov	In press	Cui et al.	Middle-Late Jurassic	Jiulongshan Formation	China	A possible flower bud. The type species is F. jurassica. First announced online 2021, Final article published 2022.	Florigerminis jurassica
Gansufructus	Gen. et sp. nov	In press	Du in Du et al.	Early Cretaceous (late Aptian-early Albian)	Zhonggou Formation	China	A eudicot of uncertain phylogenetic placement. Genus includes new species G. saligna.	
Inaperturopollenites tectatus	Sp. nov	Valid	D'Apolito, Jaramillo & Harrington	Miocene	Solimões Formation	Brazil	Fossil pollen.	
Ladakhipollenites? corvattatus	Sp. nov	Valid	D'Apolito, Jaramillo & Harrington	Miocene	Solimões Formation	Brazil	Fossil pollen.	
Ladakhipollenites? endoporatus	Sp. nov	Valid	D'Apolito, Jaramillo & Harrington	Miocene	Solimões Formation	Brazil	Fossil pollen.	
Ladakhipollenites nanus	Sp. nov	Valid	D'Apolito, Jaramillo & Harrington	Miocene	Solimões Formation	Brazil	Fossil pollen.	
Ladakhipollenites? sphaericus	Sp. nov	Valid	D'Apolito, Jaramillo & Harrington	Miocene	Solimões Formation	Brazil	Fossil pollen.	
Margocolporites bilinearis	Sp. nov	Valid	D'Apolito, Jaramillo & Harrington	Miocene	Solimões Formation	Brazil	Fossil pollen.	
Margocolporites incertus	Sp. nov	Valid	D'Apolito, Jaramillo & Harrington	Miocene	Solimões Formation	Brazil	Fossil pollen.	
Multiporopollenites intermedius	Sp. nov	Valid	D'Apolito, Jaramillo & Harrington	Miocene	Solimões Formation	Brazil	Fossil pollen.	
Nigericolpites	Nom. nov	Valid	Hernández	Late Cretaceous (Maastrichtian)		Nigeria	Pollen of a flowering plant; a replacement name for Clavatricolpites Hoeken-Klinkenberg (1964).	
Psilaperiporites circinatus	Sp. nov	Valid	D'Apolito, Jaramillo & Harrington	Miocene	Solimões Formation	Brazil	Fossil pollen.	
Psilaperiporites depressus	Sp. nov	Valid	D'Apolito, Jaramillo & Harrington	Miocene	Solimões Formation	Brazil	Fossil pollen.	
Psilastephanocolporites ectoporatus	Sp. nov	Valid	D'Apolito, Jaramillo & Harrington	Miocene	Solimões Formation	Brazil	Fossil pollen.	
Psilastephanocolporites pseudomarinamensis	Sp. nov	Valid	D'Apolito, Jaramillo & Harrington	Miocene	Solimões Formation	Brazil	Fossil pollen.	
Ranunculacidites pontoreticulatus	Sp. nov	Valid	D'Apolito, Jaramillo & Harrington	Miocene	Solimões Formation	Brazil	Fossil pollen.	
Retibrevitricolpites pseudoretibolus	Sp. nov	Valid	D'Apolito, Jaramillo & Harrington	Miocene	Solimões Formation	Brazil	Fossil pollen.	
Retiperiporites retiporatus	Sp. nov	Valid	D'Apolito, Jaramillo & Harrington	Miocene	Solimões Formation	Brazil	Fossil pollen.	
Retistephanocolpites liberalis	Sp. nov	Valid	D'Apolito, Jaramillo & Harrington	Miocene	Solimões Formation	Brazil	Fossil pollen.	
Retistephanocolporites loxocolpatus	Sp. nov	Valid	D'Apolito, Jaramillo & Harrington	Miocene	Solimões Formation	Brazil	Fossil pollen.	
Retitrescolpites benjaminensis	Sp. nov	Valid	D'Apolito, Jaramillo & Harrington	Miocene	Solimões Formation	Brazil	Fossil pollen.	
Retitrescolpites brevicolpatus	Sp. nov	Valid	D'Apolito, Jaramillo & Harrington	Miocene	Solimões Formation	Brazil	Fossil pollen.	
Retitrescolpites grossus	Sp. nov	Valid	D'Apolito, Jaramillo & Harrington	Miocene	Solimões Formation	Brazil	Fossil pollen.	
Retitrescolpites kriptoporus	Sp. nov	Valid	D'Apolito, Jaramillo & Harrington	Miocene	Solimões Formation	Brazil	Fossil pollen.	
Retitrescolpites marginatus	Sp. nov	Valid	D'Apolito, Jaramillo & Harrington	Miocene	Solimões Formation	Brazil	Fossil pollen.	
Retitriporites discretus	Sp. nov	Valid	D'Apolito, Jaramillo & Harrington	Miocene	Solimões Formation	Brazil	Fossil pollen.	
Retitriporites sifonis	Sp. nov	Valid	D'Apolito, Jaramillo & Harrington	Miocene	Solimões Formation	Brazil	Fossil pollen.	
Rhoipites apertus	Sp. nov	Valid	D'Apolito, Jaramillo & Harrington	Miocene	Solimões Formation	Brazil	Fossil pollen.	
Rhoipites? colpiverrucosus	Sp. nov	Valid	D'Apolito, Jaramillo & Harrington	Miocene	Solimões Formation	Brazil	Fossil pollen.	
Rhoipites crassinexinicus	Sp. nov	Valid	D'Apolito, Jaramillo & Harrington	Miocene	Solimões Formation	Brazil	Fossil pollen.	
Rhoipites crassitectatus	Sp. nov	Valid	D'Apolito, Jaramillo & Harrington	Miocene	Solimões Formation	Brazil	Fossil pollen.	
Rhoipites grossomurus	Sp. nov	Valid	D'Apolito, Jaramillo & Harrington	Miocene	Solimões Formation	Brazil	Fossil pollen.	
Rhoipites guttatus	Sp. nov	Valid	D'Apolito, Jaramillo & Harrington	Miocene	Solimões Formation	Brazil	Fossil pollen.	
Rhoipites lolongatus	Sp. nov	Valid	D'Apolito, Jaramillo & Harrington	Miocene	Solimões Formation	Brazil	Fossil pollen.	
Rhoipites protoguttatus	Sp. nov	Valid	D'Apolito, Jaramillo & Harrington	Miocene	Solimões Formation	Brazil	Fossil pollen.	
Rhoipites pseudocrassopolaris	Sp. nov	Valid	D'Apolito, Jaramillo & Harrington	Miocene	Solimões Formation	Brazil	Fossil pollen.	
Rhoipites pseudopilatus	Sp. nov	Valid	D'Apolito, Jaramillo & Harrington	Miocene	Solimões Formation	Brazil	Fossil pollen.	
Rhoipites pseudoscabratus	Sp. nov	Valid	D'Apolito, Jaramillo & Harrington	Miocene	Solimões Formation	Brazil	Fossil pollen.	
Rhoipites quantulus	Sp. nov	Valid	D'Apolito, Jaramillo & Harrington	Miocene	Solimões Formation	Brazil	Fossil pollen.	
Rhoipites vilis	Sp. nov	Valid	D'Apolito, Jaramillo & Harrington	Miocene	Solimões Formation	Brazil	Fossil pollen.	
Tetracolporopollenites nanus	Sp. nov	Valid	D'Apolito, Jaramillo & Harrington	Miocene	Solimões Formation	Brazil	Fossil pollen.	
Tetracolporopollenites xatanawensis	Sp. nov	Valid	D'Apolito, Jaramillo & Harrington	Miocene	Solimões Formation	Brazil	Fossil pollen.	

== Other plants ==
Name	Novelty	Status	Authors	Age	Type locality	Location	Notes	Images
Adelocladoxis	Gen. et sp. nov	Valid	Durieux et al.	Devonian (Emsian)	Battery Point Formation	Canada (Quebec)	A member of Cladoxylopsida. Genus includes new species A. praecox.	
Baragwanathia brevifolioides	Nom. nov	Valid	Kraft & Kvaček	Silurian (Přídolí)	Požáry Formation	Czech Republic	A member of the family Drepanophycaceae; a replacement name for Baragwanathia brevifolia Kraft & Kvaček (2017).	
Camarozonosporites fossulatus	Sp. nov	Valid	D'Apolito, Jaramillo & Harrington	Miocene	Solimões Formation	Brazil	Spores of a member of the family Lycopodiaceae.	
Cingulatisporites cristatus	Sp. nov	Valid	D'Apolito, Jaramillo & Harrington	Miocene	Solimões Formation	Brazil	Spores of a member of the genus Selaginella.	
Cingulatisporites matisiensis	Sp. nov	Valid	D'Apolito, Jaramillo & Harrington	Miocene	Solimões Formation	Brazil	Spores of a member of the genus Phaeoceros.	
Closterium mosbruggeri	Sp. nov	Valid	Ivanov & Belkinova	Miocene (Serravallian)		Bulgaria	A green alga, a species of Closterium.	
Colpodexylon mergae	Sp. nov	In press	Harris et al.	Devonian (Famennian)	Witpoort Formation	South Africa	A member of Lycopsida.	
Colpodexylon pullumpedes	Sp. nov	In press	Harris et al.	Devonian (Famennian)	Witpoort Formation	South Africa	A member of Lycopsida.	
Cordaabaxicutis martii	Sp. nov	Valid	Šimůnek & Lojka	Carboniferous (Pennsylvanian)	Kladno Formation	Czech Republic	Cordaitalean cuticles.	
Cordaabaxicutis papillosus	Sp. nov	Valid	Šimůnek & Lojka	Carboniferous (Pennsylvanian)	Kladno Formation	Czech Republic	Cordaitalean cuticles.	
Cordaadaxicutis raristomatus	Sp. nov	Valid	Šimůnek & Lojka	Carboniferous (Pennsylvanian)	Kladno Formation	Czech Republic	Cordaitalean cuticles.	
Cynodontium luthii	Sp. nov	Valid	Bippus, Rothwell & Stockey	Late Cretaceous		United States (Alaska)	A moss belonging to the family Rhabdoweisiaceae, a species of Cynodontium.	
Dayvaultia	Gen. et sp. nov	Valid	Manchester et al.	Late Jurassic	Morrison Formation	United States (Utah)	A seed-bearing structure of gnetalean affinity. Genus includes new species D. tetragona.	
Distefanopolia	Gen. et comb. nov	Valid	Barattolo, Romano & Conrad	Late Triassic and possibly Early Jurassic		Austria; Czech Republic; Germany; Greece; Italy; Oman; Slovakia	A green alga belonging to the group Dasycladales and the family Bornetelleae. Genus includes "Heteroporella" micropora Di Stefano & Senowbari-Daryan (1985), "Heteroporella" macropora Di Stefano, 1981 ex Di Stefano & Senowbari-Daryan (1985), "Chinianella" zanklii Ott (1967), "Chinianella" crosii Ott (1968) and "Heteroporella" carpatica Bystrický (1967).	
Distichophytum mogilatii	Sp. nov	Valid	Naugolnykh	Devonian		Russia (Krasnoyarsk Krai)	A member of the family Zosterophyllaceae.	
Dragastanella	Gen. et sp. et comb. nov	Valid	Barattolo, Bucur & Marian	Early Cretaceous		Italy; Romania; Spain	A green alga belonging to the group Dasycladales. Genus includes new species D. transylvanica, as well as "Zittelina" hispanica Masse, Arias & Vilas (1993), "Zittelina" massei Bucur, Granier & Săsăran (2010) and "Triploporella" matesina Barattolo (1980).	
Elandia	Gen. et sp. nov	Valid	Gess & Prestianni	Devonian (Lochkovian?)	Baviaanskloof Formation	South Africa	An early polysporangiophyte. Genus includes new species E. itshoba.	
Flabellopteris	Gen. et sp. nov	In press	Gess & Prestianni	Devonian (Famennian)	Witpoort Formation	South Africa	A fern-like plant of uncertain affinities. Genus includes new species F. lococannensis.	
Foraminisporis connexus	Sp. nov	Valid	D'Apolito, Jaramillo & Harrington	Miocene	Solimões Formation	Brazil	Spores of a member of the genus Anthoceros.	
Frullania kachinensis	Sp. nov	Valid	Li et al.	Cretaceous	Burmese amber	Myanmar	A liverwort, a species of Frullania.	
Frullania palaeoafricana	Sp. nov	In press	Bouju et al.	Miocene	Ethiopian amber	Ethiopia	A liverwort, a species of Frullania.	
Frullania shewanensis	Sp. nov	In press	Bouju et al.	Miocene	Ethiopian amber	Ethiopia	A liverwort, a species of Frullania.	
Gilboaphyton fuyunensis	Sp. nov	In press	Liu et al.	Late Devonian	Kaxiweng Formation	China	A member of Protolepidodendrales.	
Guazia	Gen. et sp. nov	In press	Wang et al.	Late Devonian	Wutong Formation	China	A seed plant of uncertain phylogenetic placement. Genus includes new species G. dongzhiensis.	
Ixostrobus daohugouensis	Sp. nov	In press	Na & Sun in Na et al.	Middle Jurassic		China	A member of Czekanowskiales.	
Kenrickia	Gen. et sp. nov	In press	Toledo et al.	Devonian (Emsian)	Battery Point Formation	Canada	An early euphyllophyte belonging to the group Radiatopses. Genus includes new species K. bivena.	
Krommia	Gen. et sp. nov	Valid	Gess & Prestianni	Devonian (Lochkovian?)	Baviaanskloof Formation	Brazil; South Africa	An early polysporangiophyte. Genus includes new species K. parvapila.	
Lejeunea abyssinicoides	Sp. nov	In press	Bouju et al.	Miocene	Ethiopian amber	Ethiopia	A liverwort, a species of Lejeunea.	
Lycaugea	Gen. et sp. nov	Valid	Meyer-Berthaud, Decombeix & Blanchard	Devonian (Famennian)		Australia	A lycopsid. Genus includes new species L. edieae.	
Lycopodiumsporites amazonicus	Sp. nov	Valid	D'Apolito, Jaramillo & Harrington	Miocene	Solimões Formation	Brazil	Spores of a member of the family Lycopodiaceae.	
Melvillipteris sonidia	Sp. nov	In press	Bai et al.	Devonian (probably Famennian)		China	A member of Rhacophytales.	
Mesochara adobensis	Sp. nov	In press	De Sosa Tomas et al.	Early Cretaceous	Los Adobes Formation	Argentina	A member of Charophyta.	
Mesochara dobrogeica	Sp. nov	In press	Sanjuan et al.	Early Cretaceous (Berriasian)		Romania	A member of Charophyta.	
Mixoxylon	Gen. et sp. nov	In press	Chernomorets & Sakala	Early Cretaceous (Albian)	Whisky Bay Formation	Antarctica	A homoxylous wood of uncertain systematic affinities. Genus includes new species M. australe.	
Mtshaelo	Gen. et sp. nov	Valid	Gess & Prestianni	Devonian (Lochkovian?)	Baviaanskloof Formation	South Africa	An early polysporangiophyte. Genus includes new species M. kougaensis.	
Omniastrobus	Gen. et sp. nov	Valid	Bonacorsi et al.	Devonian (Emsian)	Campbellton Formation	Canada	A lycophyte. Genus includes new species O. dawsonii.	
Palaeonitella trifurcata	Sp. nov	Valid	Martín-Closas et al.	Early Cretaceous (Barremian–Aptian)		Spain	A member of Charophyta belonging to the family Characeae.	
Paratingia wuhaia	Sp. nov	Valid	Wang et al.	Permian (Asselian)	Taiyuan Formation	China	A progymnosperm belonging to the group Noeggerathiales and the family Tingiostachyaceae.	
Permotheca? musaformis	Sp. nov	Valid	Foraponova & Karasev	Permian		Russia	A pteridosperm.	
Radula heinrichsii	Sp. nov	In press	Feldberg et al.	Cretaceous	Burmese amber	Myanmar	A liverwort, a species of Radula.	
Rehamnia	Gen. et sp. nov	In press	Oukassou & Naugolnykh	Late Devonian		Morocco	A member of Lycopodiophyta of uncertain phylogenetic placement. Genus includes new species R. michardis.	
Ricciopsis baojishanensis	Sp. nov	In press	Han & Yan in Han et al.	Late Triassic	Nanying'er Formation	China	A liverwort.	
Salopella laidae	Sp. nov	Valid	McSweeney, Shimeta & Buckeridge	Devonian (Pragian)	Yea Formation	Australia	An early land plant of uncertain affinities.	
Skyttegaardia	Gen. et sp. nov	In press	Friis, Crane & Pedersen	Early Cretaceous (Berriasian)		Denmark	A plant of uncertain phylogenetic placement, possibly close to cycads. Genus includes new species S. galtieri.	
Thysananthus aethiopicus	Sp. nov	In press	Bouju et al.	Miocene	Ethiopian amber	Ethiopia	A liverwort belonging to the family Lejeuneaceae.	
Velascoa	Gen. et sp. nov	Junior homonym	Flores Barragan, Velasco de León & Ortega Chavez	Permian	Matzitzi Formation	Mexico	Fossil leaves of a plant of uncertain phylogenetic placement, with a morphology similar to Ginkgophyta. Genus includes new species V. pueblensis. The generic name is preoccupied by Velascoa Calderón & Rzedowski (1997).	
Vitinellopsis	Gen. et sp. nov	In press	Vachard, Bucur & Munnecke	Silurian		Sweden	A green alga belonging to the group Bryopsidales. Genus includes new species V. gotlandica.	
Zosterophyllum confertum	Sp. nov	In press	Gossmann et al.	Early Devonian		Germany	A zosterophyll.	

== Palynology ==
Name	Novelty	Status	Authors	Age	Type locality	Location	Notes	Images
Camarozonosporites trilobatus	Sp. nov	Valid	D'Apolito, Jaramillo & Harrington	Miocene	Solimões Formation	Brazil	A spore of lycopodialean affinity.	
Echinatisporis infantulus	Sp. nov	Valid	D'Apolito, Jaramillo & Harrington	Miocene	Solimões Formation	Brazil	Fossil spores.	
Erlansonisporites duwaensis	Sp. nov	Valid	Li et al.	Mesozoic		China		
Erlansonisporites exquisitus	Sp. nov	Valid	Li et al.	Mesozoic		China		
Erlansonisporites perbellus	Sp. nov	Valid	Li et al.	Mesozoic		China		
Erlansonisporites textilis	Sp. nov	Valid	Li et al.	Mesozoic		China		
Ginkgomonocolpites	Nom. nov	Valid	Hernández	Paleogene		India	A gymnosperm pollen; a replacement name for Psilamonocolpites Mathur (1966).	
Hamulatisporis bareanus	Sp. nov	Valid	D'Apolito, Jaramillo & Harrington	Miocene	Solimões Formation	Brazil	Fossil spores.	
Henrisporites longibaculiformis	Sp. nov	Valid	Li et al.	Mesozoic		China		
Horstisporites comitus	Sp. nov	Valid	Li et al.	Mesozoic		China		
Horstisporites denticulatus	Sp. nov	Valid	Li et al.	Mesozoic		China		
Horstisporites subtilis	Sp. nov	Valid	Li et al.	Mesozoic		China		
Horstisporites tarimensis	Sp. nov	Valid	Li et al.	Mesozoic		China		
Hughesisporites reticulatus	Sp. nov	Valid	Li et al.	Mesozoic		China		
Hughesisporites unicus	Sp. nov	Valid	Li et al.	Mesozoic		China		
Ischyosporites dubius	Sp. nov	Valid	D'Apolito, Jaramillo & Harrington	Miocene	Solimões Formation	Brazil	A spore of dicksoniaceous affinity.	
Ischyosporites granulatus	Sp. nov	Valid	D'Apolito, Jaramillo & Harrington	Miocene	Solimões Formation	Brazil	Fossil spores.	
Laevigatosporites indigestus	Sp. nov	Valid	D'Apolito, Jaramillo & Harrington	Miocene	Solimões Formation	Brazil	Fossil spores.	
Luntaispora	Gen. et sp. nov	Valid	Li et al.	Mesozoic		China	Genus includes new species L. laevigata.	
Microfoveolatosporis simplex	Sp. nov	Valid	D'Apolito, Jaramillo & Harrington	Miocene	Solimões Formation	Brazil	Fossil spores.	
Minerisporites tarimensis	Sp. nov	Valid	Li et al.	Mesozoic		China		
Minerisporites triangularis	Sp. nov	Valid	Li et al.	Mesozoic		China		
Narkisporites conicus	Sp. nov	Valid	Li et al.	Mesozoic		China		
Narkisporites densibaculatus	Sp. nov	Valid	Li et al.	Mesozoic		China		
Narkisporites densiconicus	Sp. nov	Valid	Li et al.	Mesozoic		China		
Narkisporites tarimensis	Sp. nov	Valid	Li et al.	Mesozoic		China		
Neoraistrickia dubia	Sp. nov	Valid	D'Apolito, Jaramillo & Harrington	Miocene	Solimões Formation	Brazil	Fossil spores.	
Noniasporites triassicus	Sp. nov	Valid	Ghosh et al.	Early Triassic	Panchet Formation	India	A megaspore.	
Otynisporites tarimensis	Sp. nov	Valid	Li et al.	Mesozoic		China		
Polypodiisporites discretus	Sp. nov	Valid	D'Apolito, Jaramillo & Harrington	Miocene	Solimões Formation	Brazil	Fossil spores.	
Psilatriletes delicatus	Sp. nov	Valid	D'Apolito, Jaramillo & Harrington	Miocene	Solimões Formation	Brazil	Fossil spores.	
Punctatosporites latrubessei	Sp. nov	Valid	D'Apolito, Jaramillo & Harrington	Miocene	Solimões Formation	Brazil	Fossil spores.	
Rotverrusporites amazonicus	Sp. nov	Valid	D'Apolito, Jaramillo & Harrington	Miocene	Solimões Formation	Brazil	Fossil spores.	
Stellibacutriletes	Gen. et 4 sp. nov	Valid	Li et al.	Mesozoic		China	Genus includes new species S. capillaris, S. gracilis, S. rarus and S. solidus.	
Striatriletes inconspicuus	Sp. nov	Valid	Li et al.	Mesozoic		China		
Tarimispora	Gen. et 2 sp. nov	Valid	Li et al.	Mesozoic		China	Genus includes new species T. auriculata and T. perfecta.	
Tricristatispora trilobata	Sp. nov	Valid	Li et al.	Mesozoic		China		
Tricristatispora yingmailensis	Sp. nov	Valid	Li et al.	Mesozoic		China		
Trileites plicatilis	Sp. nov	Valid	Li et al.	Mesozoic		China		
Verrucatotriletes pseudovirueloides	Sp. nov	Valid	D'Apolito, Jaramillo & Harrington	Miocene	Solimões Formation	Brazil	Fossil spores.	

=== Palynological research ===
- Strother & Foster (2021) describe an assemblage of fossil spores from the Ordovician (Tremadocian) of Australia, representing a morphology that was intermediate morphology between confirmed land plant spores and earlier forms of uncertain phylogenetic placement, and evaluate the implications of these fossils for the knowledge of the evolution of land plants from their algal ancestors.
- A study on the fossil pollen record from New Zealand, dating from 100 million years ago to the present, is published by Prebble et al. (2021), who report evidence indicating that Cretaceous diversification was closely followed by an increase in flowering plants frequency, but their maximum frequency did not occur until the Eocene.
- A study on changes of abundance in spores and pollen record from the Danish Basin, and on their implications for the knowledge of the impact of the Triassic–Jurassic extinction event on land plants, is published by Lindström (2021).
- A study on the vegetation history in the southwestern Balkans, as indicated by pollen from the sedimentary record in the Lake Ohrid extending to 1.36 million years ago, is published by Donders et al. (2021).

== Research ==
- A study on changes of the morphological complexity of reproductive structures of land plants throughout their evolutionary history, based on data from fossil and extant land plants, is published by Leslie, Simpson & Mander (2021).
- Revision of Silurian (Wenlock to Přídolí) assemblages of polysporangiophytes with dispersed spores and cryptospores, aiming to determine the relationship between Silurian plant evolution and climate changes linked with perturbations of the global carbon cycle, is published by Pšenička et al. (2021).
- Reconstruction of the structure and development of the rooting system of Asteroxylon mackiei is presented by Hetherington et al. (2021).
- A study on factors influencing the extent of arboreal vegetation during the Late Paleozoic icehouse is published by Matthaeus et al. (2021), who interpret their findings as indicating that Pangaea could have supported widespread arboreal plant growth and forest cover based on leaf water constraints, but the forest extent was restricted because of impact of freezing on plants, and estimate that contracting forest cover increased net global surface runoff by up to 6.1%.
- Description of the reproductive organs of the lycopsids from the Upper Devonian Wutong Formation (China), and a study on the ability of the sporophyll units for wind dispersal, is published by Zhou et al. (2021), who name new form species Lepidophylloides longshanensis and Lepidophylloides changxingensis.
- An exceptionally well preserved Brasilodendron-like lycopsid forest containing over 150 upright stumps is described from an early Permian postglacial landscape of western Gondwana (Paraná Basin, Brazil) by Mottin et al. (2021).
- A study on the anatomy of Stigmaria asiatica is published by Chen et al. (2021).
- Stump casts of Sigillaria, preserving traces of internal anatomy, are described from the earliest Permian Wuda Tuff (China) by D'Antonio et al. (2021).
- A study aiming to determine probable causes of the world-wide proliferation of members of Isoetales, particularly Pleuromeia, during and in the aftermath of the Permian–Triassic extinction event, and evaluating the implications of this proliferation for the knowledge of environmental stresses during and in the aftermath of this extinction event, is published by Looy, van Konijnenburg-van Cittert & Duijnstee (2021).
- New fossil material of Saportaea salisburioides, providing new information on leaf morphology and growth of this plant, is described from the Permian Umm Irna Formation (Jordan) by Kerp et al. (2021), who interpret their findings as indicating that Saportaea grandifolia and Baiera virginiana were synonyms of S. salisburioides, and possibly indicating that the fructification belonging to the genus Nystroemia is a part of Saportaea.
- Description of Geinitzia reichenbachii from its gross morphology to the cellular scale, and a study on the likely ecology of this conifer, is published by Moreau et al. (2021).
- A study on the evolutionary history of the family Cycadaceae, based on genomic data and fossil record, is published by Liu et al. (2021).
- Well-preserved recurved cupules of seed plants are described from the Lower Cretaceous of China by Shi et al. (2021), who interpret the structure of these cupules as consistent with the recurved form and development of the second integument in the bitegmic anatropous ovules of flowering plants, and evaluate the implications of these fossils for the knowledge of the origin of the flowering plants.
- Taxonomically diverse flora from the Seafood Salad locality, found ~65 m below the Cretaceous-Paleogene boundary in the Hell Creek Formation (Montana, United States), is described by Wilson, Wilson Mantilla & Strӧmberg (2021), who study the affinities of plants of this locality and compare them with other Late Cretaceous floras of the Western Interior.
- A study on the timing of the origin of the flowering plants, based on data from fossil record and from the diversity of extant members of this group, is published by Silvestro et al. (2021), who interpret their findings as indicating that several flowering plant families originated in the Jurassic.
- A study on the diversity of insect damage types in fossil plants from the Cretaceous (Albian to Cenomanian) Dakota Formation (United States), evaluating their implications for the knowledge of the early evolution of angiosperm florivory and associated pollination, is published by Xiao et al. (2021).
- New fossil material of Callianthus dilae is described from the Lower Cretaceous Yixian Formation (China) by Wang et al. (2021), who reconstruct the whole plant of Callianthus, interpreting it as an aquatic flowering plant.
- A study on the anatomy of the epidermal features of the floating leaves of Quereuxia angulata from the Upper Cretaceous Yong'ancun Formation (China) is published by Liang et al. (2021).
- A study on plant extinction and ecological change in tropical forests resulting from the Cretaceous–Paleogene extinction event, based on data from fossil pollen and leaves from Colombia, is published by Carvalho et al. (2021), who report evidence indicative of a long interval of low plant diversity in the Neotropics after the end-Cretaceous extinction, and the emergence of forests with a structure resembling modern Neotropical rainforests, with a closed canopy and multistratal structure dominated by flowering plants, during the Paleocene.
- A study on the impact of the mid-Eocene greenhouse warming event on floras from southernmost South America is published by Fernández et al. (2021).
- Evidence from middle Eocene-middle Miocene tuffaceous deposits of central and northern Patagonia, indicating that soils, vegetation, insects and mammal herbivores began to record diverse traits related to the presence of grasslands with mosaic vegetation since middle Eocene, is presented by Bellosi et al. (2021).
- A study on Middle Miocene microfloral assemblages from ten localities in the Madrid Basin (Spain), providing evidence of prevalence of open habitats with grass-dominated, savannah-like vegetation under a warm and semi-arid climatic regime in the Iberian Peninsula in the Middle Miocene, is published by Casas-Gallego et al. (2021).
- Crump et al. (2021) present a record of vegetation from the Last Interglacial based on ancient DNA from lake sediment from the Baffin Island (Canada), and report evidence of major ecosystem changes in the Arctic in response to warmth, including a ~400 km northward range shift of dwarf birch relative to today.

== Deaths ==
- Alan Graham (1934–2021), died on 8 July 2021. Graham earned his PhD in 1962 under the guidance of Chester A. Arnold, and was noted for a career studying the Cenozoic paleobotany of the Caribbean and Central America.
