= Hay-scented fern =

Hay-scented fern is a common name for several plants and may refer to:

- Dennstaedtia, genus that formerly contained Sitobolium
  - Dennstaedtia bipinnata, a species native to the Americas
- Dryopteris aemula, native to Western Europe
- Sitobolium, genus native to Asia and North America
