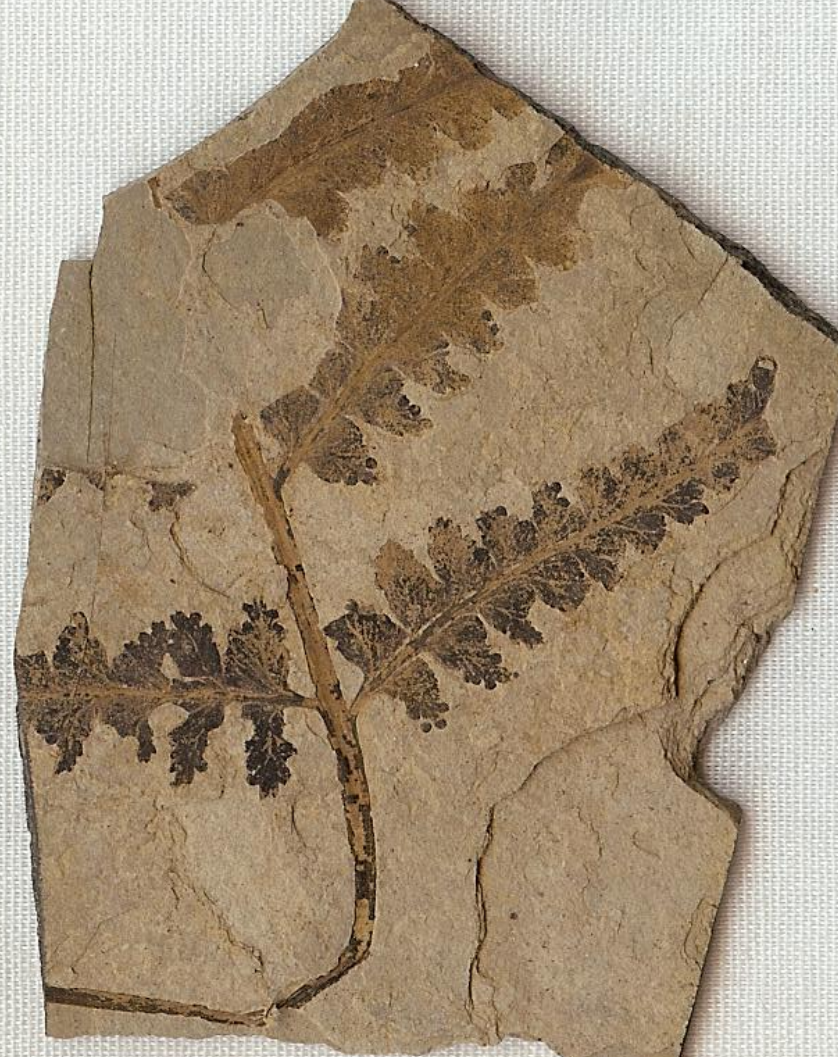
- Holotype fossil

Scientific classification
- Kingdom: Plantae
- Clade: Tracheophytes
- Division: Polypodiophyta
- Class: Polypodiopsida
- Order: Polypodiales
- Family: Dennstaedtiaceae
- Genus: Dennstaedtia
- Species: †D. christophelii

Binomial name
- †Dennstaedtia christophelii Pigg et al.

= Dennstaedtia christophelii =

Dennstaedtia christophelii Temporal range: Eocene (Ypresian) ~51–49 Ma

Fossil species of fern

Dennstaedtia christophelii is an extinct species of fern in the family Dennstaedtiaceae related to the modern hayscented ferns. The species is known from fossil fronds found in early Eocene sites of northern Washington state, United States, and central British Columbia, Canada. The species is suggested to be closest to a Neotropical "Patania" clade and specifically the species Dennstaedtia producta and Dennstaedtia mathewsii.

== Distribution ==
Dennstaedtia christophelii fossils have been recovered from the two sites in the Eocene Okanagan Highlands of Central British Columbia and northeast central Washington state. Two of the described specimens are from the Klondike Mountain Formation in Northern Ferry County, Washington, but recovered from separate outcrops, the "Boot Hill" site B4131 in Republic, and "S100" just to the Northwest of Republic. The third known specimen is from the Tranquille Formation's Falkland site on Estekwalan Mountain in the Columbia–Shuswap region of South Central British Columbia.

== History and classification ==
Fern fossils of the subclass Polypodiidae, commonly called leptosporangiate ferns, have been reported in the Eocene Okanagan Highlands since the late 1890s, and the first fertile fond material report came from Edward W. Berry (1926). More recently the Falkland specimen was first figured in Robin Y. Smith's 2011 PhD dissertation. The Republic and Falkland fossils were studied subsequently by a group of paleobotanists led by Kathleen B. Pigg, with the 2021 type description of the species being published in the International Journal of Plant Sciences. They designated three type specimens at the time of publication, the holotype "SR 13-004-001 A&B" and paratype "SR 13-007-003 A&B" which were both accessioned in the Stonerose Interpretive Center paleobotanical collection, while the second paratype "US960-10656" was part of the Royal British Columbia Museum paleontology collection. The holotype and paratype 1 were collected from the Klondike Mountain Formation, at site "B4131" and "S100" respectively, while paratype 3 was collected from "Unit 1" of the Falkland sites Tranquille Formation exposure. The team coined the specific epithet christophelii as a patronym honoring David C. Christophel who was a mentor to two of the research team, David Greenwood and James Basinger.

The group placed the new species into the modern genus Dennstaedtia based on the specific placement and shape of the preserved sori indusia. The placement of the fossil sori are along the pinnae edges, while the sori of Microlepia are along the pinnae sinuses and Pteridium sori are produced as continual stripe an not as individuals. Hypolepis has lost the upper indusia while the fossils have full globose indusia on both the upper and lower surfaces. These features narrow the generic placement to Dennstaedtia. The genus as of 2022 included approximately 55 species which are mostly found in the tropics globally, with the exception of continental Africa. Of the species in Dennstaedtia, D. christophelii is most similar in its known morphology to two neotropical species D. mathewsii and D. producta. Both species are native to South America, with D. producta restricted to Colombia while D. mathewsii is known from both Bolivia and Colombia. The Okanagan Highlands species differs from the extant species in having fully spherical sori, while both modern species have subglobose sori.

The age of D. christophelii fossils has been used in several molecular phylogeny studies of Dennstaedtiineae ferns. An investigation of the suborder Dennstaedtiineae by Jin-Mei Lu et al. (2022) employed the Ypresian age of the species as part of its divergence time calibrations, specifically for the crown group Dennstaedtioideae genera. A year later, a study by Luz Triana-Moreno et al (2023) on the subfamily Dennstaedtioideae reconfirmed the placement of D. christophelii and noted the Ypresian age fell between two suggested divergence times for crown group Dennstaedtia.

== Description ==
Dennstaedtia christophelii is known only from leaf frond fossils, and as such the rhizomes frond anatomy, and spore morphology is unknown. The known fronds are all incomplete and range from 4.5–6.8 cm (1.8–2.7 in) in lengths, with the overall largest frond length unknown. The fronds have pinnation that grades from having leaflets fully divided at the base to fused leaflets approaching's the frond apices. The individual pinnae are widely spaced along the rachis and range between 5–9 mm (0.20–0.35 in) by 3–5 mm (0.12–0.20 in) wide and progress from subopposite placement basally to alternate nearer the frond apex. They have a petiole which connects from rachis to the squared off base formed by the basal most pinnule pair of the lanceolate pinnae. Due to preservation, the lack of any induments along the pinnae is probable, but not conclusively determinable.

There are between 3 and 10 pinnules, 4–5 of which are separate basally, while the apical pinnules are fused. Each of the pinnules are oblong in outline with basal margins that are sessile along the petioles. The margins of each vary from shallowly crenated into fully but shallowly lobed. Each pinnule is vascularized with a vein that forks one or two times after entering before finally ending near the leaf margin, and where they are present, in the globose sori. Sori range between 0.5–1 mm (0.020–0.039 in) wide and are surrounded by a cup-shaped indusia placed as groupings along the leaf margin and extending beyond the marginal edge. Where preserved the sori are composed of numerous sporangia. Within each sporangia, the annulus consists of between six and seven cells that are tangentially lengthened to facilitate the sporangium opening in favorable conditions. Examination of the fossils via an environmental scanning electron microscope showed that most of the leaf matter was of poor preservation and fragmentary, however the annulus tissues were distinctly well preserved.

== Paleoecology ==
Dennstaedtia christophelii is likely to have been an understory plant in the angiosperm dominated forests surrounding the lake systems.

== Paleoenvironment ==
Both Okanagan Highlands formations represent upland lake systems that were surrounded by a warm temperate ecosystem with nearby volcanism dating from during and just after the early Eocene climatic optimum. The highlands likely had a mesic upper microthermal to lower mesothermal climate, in which winter temperatures rarely dropped low enough for snow, and which were seasonably equitable. The paleoforest surrounding the lakes have been described as precursors to the modern temperate broadleaf and mixed forests of Eastern North America and Eastern Asia. Based on the fossil biotas the lakes were higher and cooler then the coeval coastal forests preserved in the Puget Group and Chuckanut Formation of Western Washington, which are described as lowland tropical forest ecosystems. Estimates of the paleoelevation range between 0.7–1.2 km (0.43–0.75 mi) higher than the coastal forests. This is consistent with the paleoelevation estimates for the lake systems, which range between 1.1–2.9 km (1,100–2,900 m), which is similar to the modern elevation 0.8 km (0.50 mi), but higher.

Estimates of the mean annual temperature have been derived from climate leaf analysis multivariate program (CLAMP) analysis of the Republic paleoflora, and leaf margin analysis (LMA) of both paleofloras. The CLAMP results after multiple linear regressions for Republic gave a mean annual temperature of approximately 8.0 °C (46.4 °F), with the LMA giving 9.2 ± 2.0 °C (48.6 ± 3.6 °F). LMA results from Falkland returned the higher 10.0 ± 2.2 °C (50.0 ± 4.0 °F), slightly higher than seen at Republic, and CLAMP analysis gave an overall mean annual temperature of 12.8 ± 1.2 °C (55.0 ± 2.2 °F). A bioclimatic-based estimate based on modern relatives of the taxa found at each site suggested mean annual temperatures around 13.5 ± 2.2 °C (56.3 ± 4.0 °F) for Republic and 14.7 ± 2.1 °C (58.5 ± 3.8 °F) for Falkland. These are lower than the mean annual temperature estimates given for the coastal Puget Group, which is estimated to have been between 15–18.6 °C (59.0–65.5 °F). The bioclimatic analysis for Republic and Falkland suggest mean annual precipitation amounts of 115 ± 39 cm (45 ± 15 in) and 105 ± 48 cm (41 ± 19 in) respectively.
