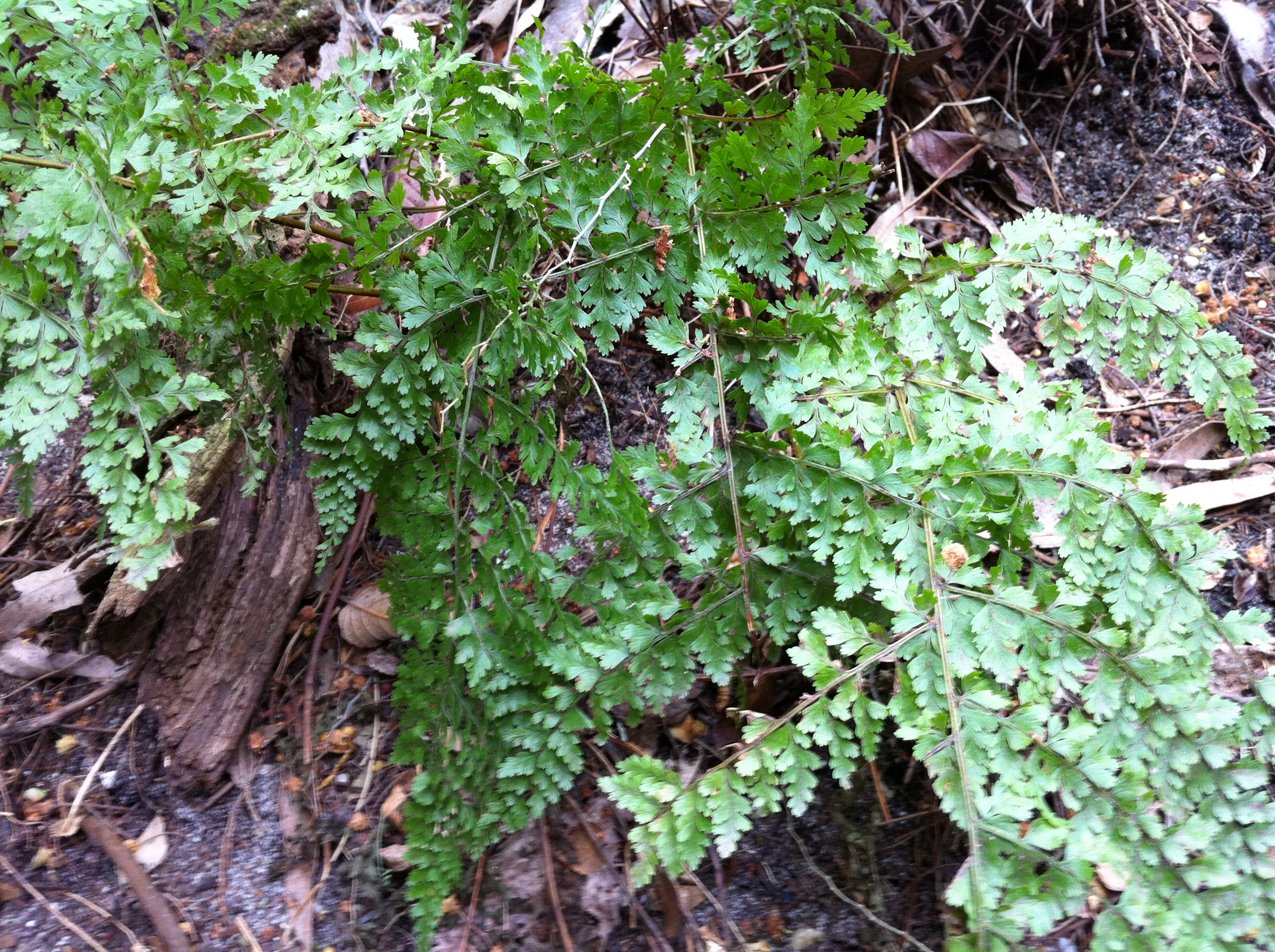

Scientific classification
- Kingdom: Plantae
- Clade: Embryophytes
- Clade: Tracheophytes
- Division: Polypodiophyta
- Class: Polypodiopsida
- Order: Polypodiales
- Family: Dennstaedtiaceae
- Genus: Dennstaedtia
- Species: D. davallioides

Binomial name
- Dennstaedtia davallioides (R.Br.) T.Moore

= Dennstaedtia davallioides =

Lacy ground fern

Species of fern

Dennstaedtia davallioides, commonly known as the lacy ground fern, is a species of fern native to eastern Australia, from the Bunya Mountains in central Queensland south through eastern New South Wales, and into Victoria southwest to the Otway Ranges.

It requires some shelter when cultivated, as can easily be damaged by wind and sun. A moisture retentive soil is beneficial. Plants can be attacked by green caterpillars in cultivation.
