= Sitobolium =

Scientific classification
- Kingdom: Plantae
- Clade: Tracheophytes
- Division: Polypodiophyta
- Class: Polypodiopsida
- Order: Polypodiales
- Family: Dennstaedtiaceae
- Genus: Sitobolium; Desv.

Synonyms
- Synonymy: Adectum Link; Coptidipteris Nakai & Momose; Emodiopteris Ching & S.K.Wu; Fuziifilix Nakai & Momose

Genus of ferns

Sitobolium is a genus of ferns described as a genus in 1827. It is distributed across tropical and eastern Asia and temperate North America. Long sunk into Dennstaedtia, it was revived in 2023 on the basis of phylogenetic evidence.

== List of species ==
As of October 2025, the following species are accepted in the genus as currently circumscribed by the Checklist of Ferns and Lycophytes of the World:

- Sitobolium appendiculatum (Wall.) L.A.Triana & Sundue
- Sitobolium hirsutum (Sw.) L.A.Triana & Sundue
- Sitobolium punctilobulum (Michx.) Desv.
- Sitobolium wilfordii (T.Moore) L.A.Triana & Sundue
- Sitobolium zeylanicum (Sw.) L.A.Triana & Sundue
