= Brasilodendron =

Brasilodendron Temporal range: Permian

Scientific classification
- Kingdom: Plantae
- Clade: Tracheophytes
- Clade: Lycophytes
- Class: Lycopodiopsida
- Order: †Lepidodendrales
- Family: †Lycopodiopsidaceae
- Genus: †Brasilodendron; W.G. Chaloner, K.U. Leistikow & A. Hill

Species
- B. africanum; B. pedroanum

Extinct genus of spore-bearing plants

Brasilodendron was a genus of lycophytes dating from the Permian. Plants were vascularized with reproduction by spores.

== Location ==
Fossils of Brasilodendron are found in the Rio Bonito Formation in southern Brazil. The species Brasilodendron cf. pedroanum was found in Encruzilhada do Sul and Mariana Pimentel. The species Brasilodendron africanum was found in Africa in Namibia.
