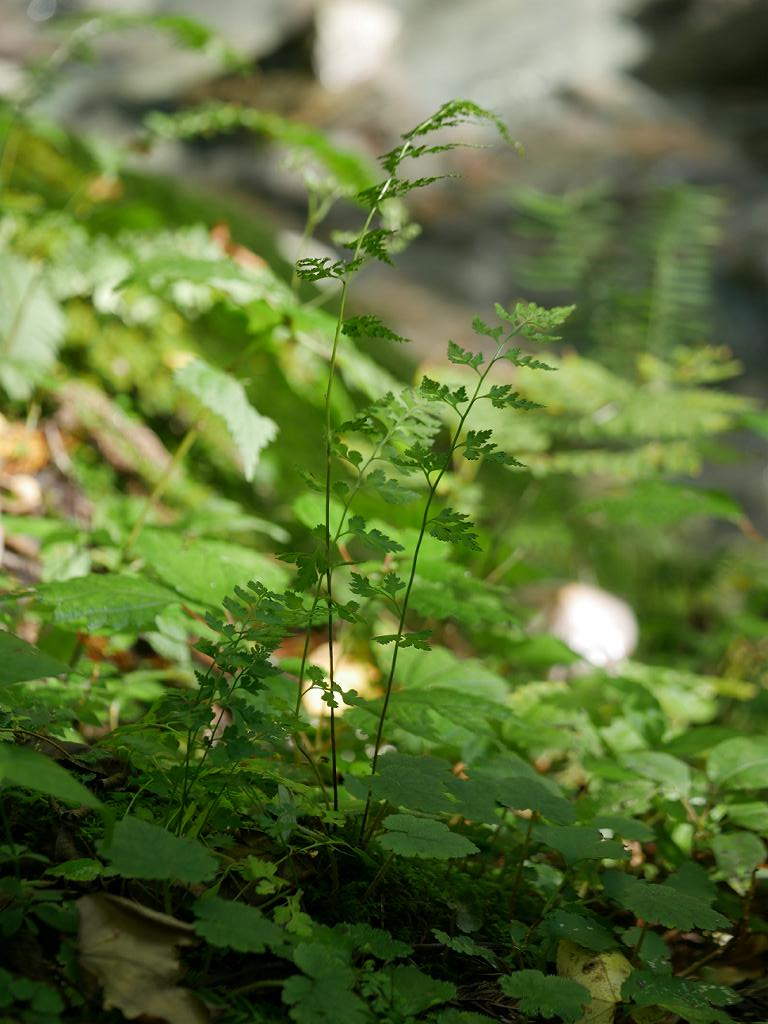

Scientific classification
- Kingdom: Plantae
- Clade: Tracheophytes
- Division: Polypodiophyta
- Class: Polypodiopsida
- Order: Polypodiales
- Family: Dennstaedtiaceae
- Genus: Sitobolium
- Species: S. wilfordii

Binomial name
- Sitobolium wilfordii (T.Moore) L.A.Triana & Sundue

Synonyms
- Coptidipteris wilfordii (T.Moore) Nakai & Momose; Dennstaedtia wilfordii (T.Moore) Christ; Microlepia nipponica (Miq.) C.Chr.; Microlepia wilfordii T.Moore; Davallia nipponica Miq.; Davallia rhomboidea Hook.; Davallia wilfordii (T.Moore) Baker

= Sitobolium wilfordii =

Species of fern

Sitobolium wilfordii is a species of fern in the family Dennstaedtiaceae. It was formerly placed in the monotypic genus Coptodipteris as Coptidipteris wilfordii. It is native from Pakistan through China to Korea and Japan.

Fungus Herpobasidium filicinum (Eocronartiaceae family, Platygloeales order) is found on the fern in Japan.
