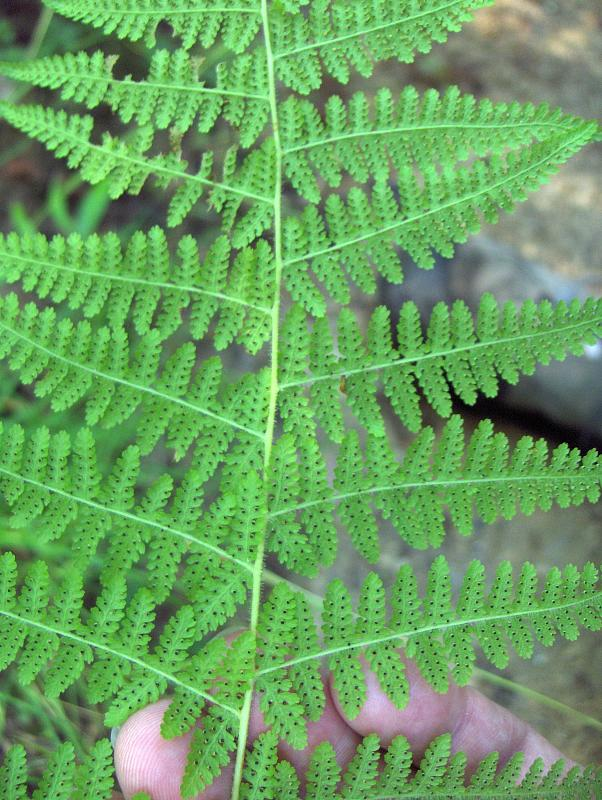

Conservation status
- Apparently Secure (NatureServe)

Scientific classification
- Kingdom: Plantae
- Clade: Tracheophytes
- Division: Polypodiophyta
- Class: Polypodiopsida
- Order: Polypodiales
- Family: Dennstaedtiaceae
- Genus: Dennstaedtia
- Species: D. bipinnata

Binomial name
- Dennstaedtia bipinnata (Cav.) Maxon

Synonyms
- Dicksonia adiantoides Willd.; Dicksonia apiifolia Hook.; Dicksonia bipinnata Cav. (1801), nom. cons. (basionym); Dicksonia globuligera Desv.; Dennstaedtia adiantoides (Willd.) T.Moore; Mucura bipinnata (Cav.) L.A.Triana & Sundue; Sitobolium adiantoides (Willd.) J.Sm.; Sitobolium apiifolium J.Sm.; Polypodium bacciferum Poir.

= Dennstaedtia bipinnata =

Species of fern

Dennstaedtia bipinnata common names the cuplet fern, cuplet hay-scented fern is a species of fern in the family Dennstaedtiaceae.

== Distribution ==
Dennstaedtia bipinnata is native to Mexico, Central America, the Greater Antilles (Cuba, Hispaniola, Jamaica, and Puerto Rico) and southern Florida. The former South American distribution belongs to D. dissecta.

== Habitat ==
Dennstaedtia bipinnata lives in moist to wet, acidic soils in forested areas.
