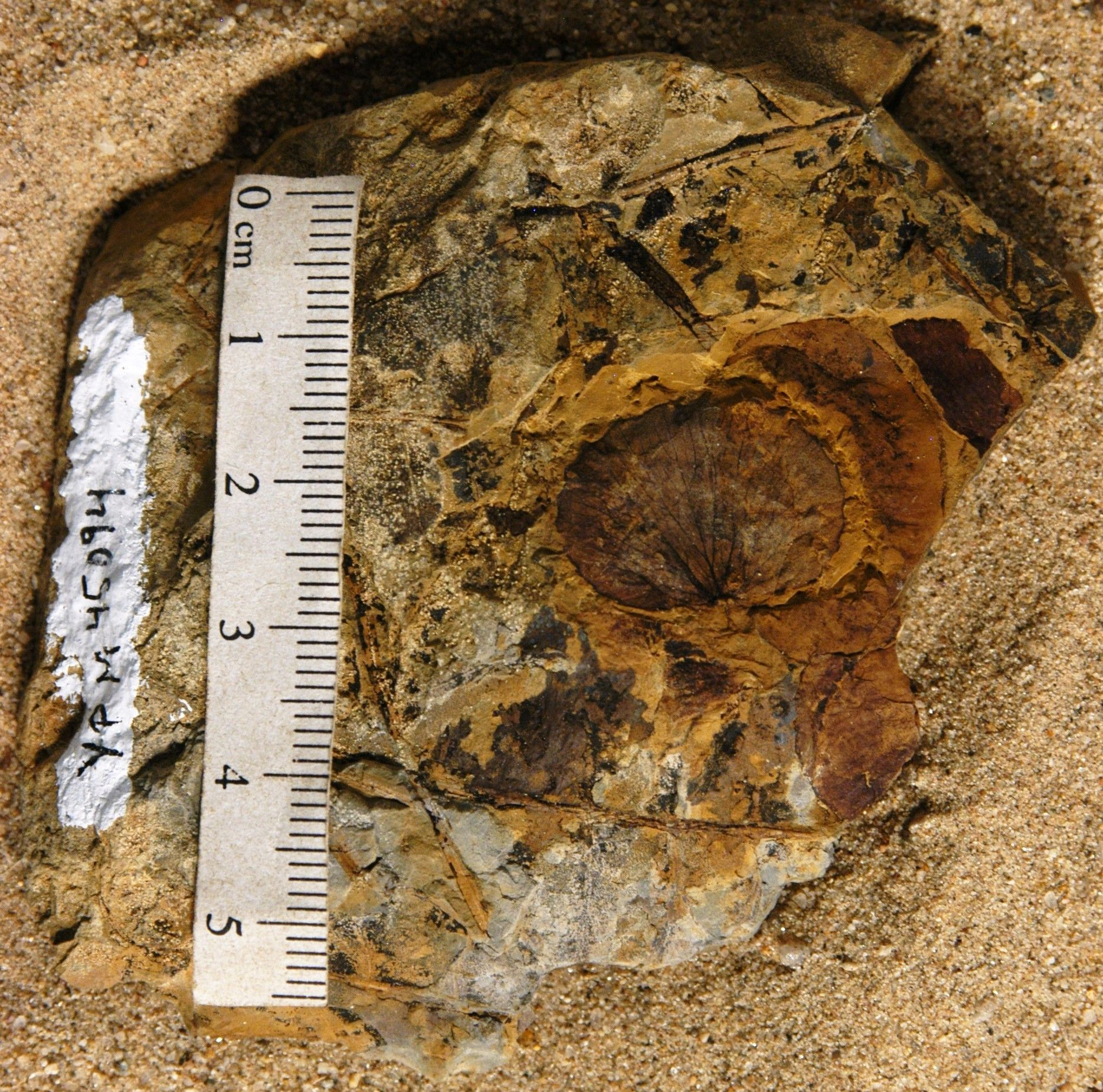
- Quereuxia angulata

Scientific classification
- Kingdom: Plantae
- Clade: Embryophytes
- Clade: Tracheophytes
- Clade: Spermatophytes
- Clade: Angiosperms
- Genus: †Quereuxia

= Quereuxia =

Quereuxia Temporal range: Campanian–Paleocene 83–56 Ma

Extinct genus of angiosperms

Quereuxia is an extinct genus of aquatic angiosperms known from fossil leaves and leaf rosettes primarily dating to the Late Cretaceous period. It also survived into the Paleocene, with Quereuxia angulata documented as a member of aquatic plant communities persisting across the Cretaceous-Paleogene boundary in northeastern Russia. These plants are notable for their floating growth habit, with morphological features suggesting adaptation to still freshwater environments. Fossil Quereuxia leaves from the Upper Cretaceous of the Amur region in Russia preserve ovipisition marks from damselflies and dragonflies, providing evidence of plant-insect interactions in ancient freshwater ecosystems.

== Classification ==
Morphological studies have confirmed the genus' distinctiveness based on features such as heterophyllous leaf arrangements (both simple and compound), floating rosettes, and submerged rhizomatous growth. Quereuxia angulata, the most well-known species, has often been compared to extant members of Trapa (water chestnut), and fossil fruits of extinct genus Paleotrapa, found in direct association with Quereuxia leaves, show morphological similarities to modern Trapa fruits. However, differences in growth habit and floral morphology have prevented confident placement within any modern family, leaving its exact taxonomic position unresolved.

== Distribution ==
Fossils are known from a wide variety of locales including Russia, Austria, The United States, Canada, China, and Mongolia.
