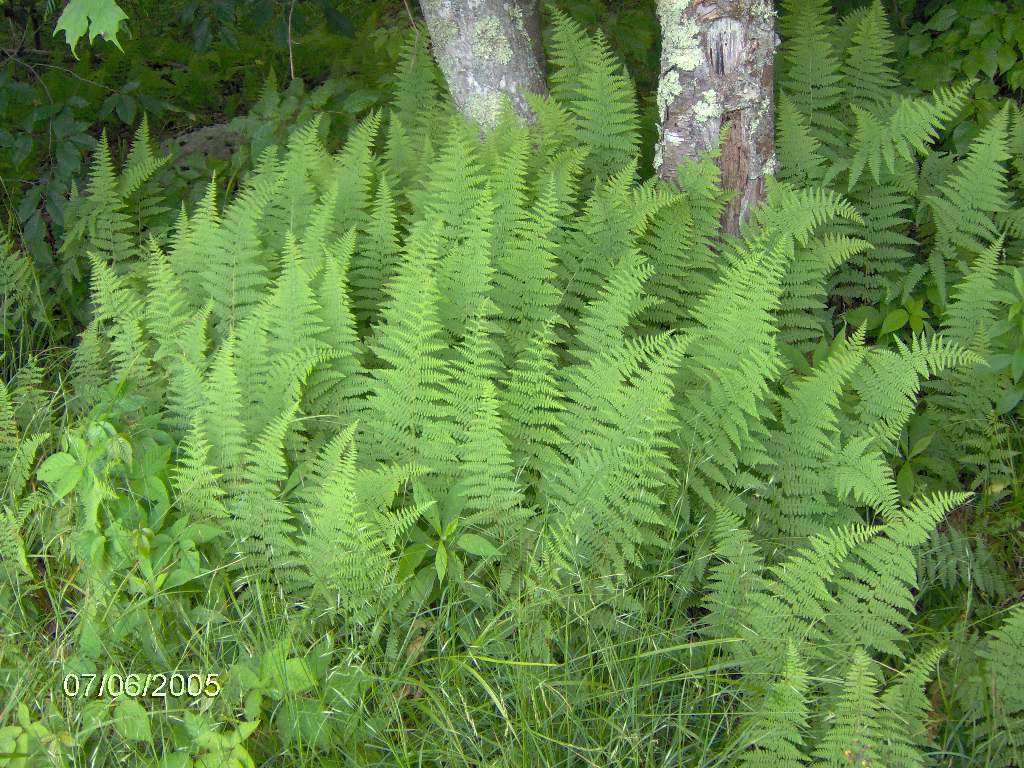

Conservation status
- Secure (NatureServe)

Scientific classification
- Kingdom: Plantae
- Clade: Tracheophytes
- Division: Polypodiophyta
- Class: Polypodiopsida
- Order: Polypodiales
- Family: Dennstaedtiaceae
- Genus: Sitobolium; Desv. (1827)
- Species: S. punctilobulum

Binomial name
- Sitobolium punctilobulum (Michx.) Desv. (1827)

Synonyms
- Synonymy: Adectum pilosiusculum (Willd.) Link (1841); Aspidium punctilobum Willd. (1810); Aspidium punctilobulum (Michx.) Sw. (1806); Dennstaedtia punctiloba (Willd.) J.Sm. (1875); Dennstaedtia punctilobula (Michx.) T.Moore (1857); Dennstaedtia punctilobula f. cristata (Maxon) Dole (1937); Dennstaedtia punctilobula var. cristata Maxon (1899); Dennstaedtia punctilobula f. nana (Gilbert) Weath. (1936); Dennstaedtia punctilobula var. poyseri Clute (1911); Dennstaedtia punctilobula f. recurvata C.F.Reed (1951); Dennstaedtia punctilobula f. schizophylla Rugg (1912); Dicksonia pilosiuscula Willd. (1809); Dicksonia pilosiuscula var. cristata Davenp. (1900); Dicksonia pilosiuscula f. nana Gilbert (1905); Dicksonia pilosiuscula f. poyseri Clute (1911); Dicksonia pilosiuscula f. schizophylla Clute (1902); Dicksonia pubescens Sw. (1809); Dicksonia punctilobula (Michx.) Hook. (1844); Dicksonia punctulobula (Michx.) Kunze (1848); Dicksonia punctilobula f. cristata Clute (1906); Dicksonia punctilobula var. poyseri Clute (1911); Dicksonia punctilobula f. schizophylla Clute (1906); Litolobium punctilobulum (Michx.) Newman (1854 publ. 1857); Nephrodium punctilobulum Michx. (1803); Polypodium punctilobum (Michx.) Poir. (1804); Sitobolium pilosiusculum (Willd.) J.Sm. (1842); Sitobolium punctilobum (Willd.) J.Sm. (1846)

= Sitobolium punctilobulum =

Species of fern

Sitobolium punctilobulum, the eastern hayscented fern or hay-scented fern, is a species of fern native to eastern North America, from Newfoundland west to Wisconsin and Arkansas, and south in the Appalachian Mountains to northern Alabama; it is most abundant in the east of its range, with only scattered populations in the west.

It is a deciduous fern with fronds growing to 40–100 cm (rarely 130 cm) tall and 10–30 cm broad; the fronds are bipinnate, with pinnatifid pinnules about three times as long as broad. It occurs in damp or dry acidic soils in woods or open woods, from sea level up to 1,200 m altitude.

Sitobolium punctilobulum can exhibit varying degrees of phototropism. The common name "Hay-scented Fern" comes from the fact that crushing it produces an aroma of fresh hay.

The presence of Sitobolium punctilobulum influences the dynamics of the understory vegetation of many forests in the eastern United States. Herbivorous animals (such as deer) reduce the abundance of woody plants through browsing.Sitobolium punctilobulum, which is not browsed by deer, takes advantage of gaps in the canopy created by deer browsing to become established. In these patches, Sitobolium punctilobulum becomes common, and the growth of woody species is restricted due to its ability to outcompete woody species for light and soil nutrients.

It was first described as Nephrodium punctilobulum by André Michaux in 1803, and has been known by a variety of synonyms.
