= Florivore =

Animal that mostly eats flowers

In zoology, a florivore (not to be confused with a folivore) is an animal that primarily eats products of flowers. Florivores are types of herbivores (often referred to as floral herbivores), yet within the feeding behavior of florivory, there is a range of other more specific feeding behaviors, including, but not limited to:

- Granivory: the consumption of grain and seeds
- Nectarivory: the consumption of flower nectar
- Palynivory: the consumption of flower pollen
- Frugivory: the consumption of fruit

== Diet ==
A florivore's diet consists of bulky foodstuffs, including the items mentioned above, yet also bark, roots, and similar items. Many florivores are also omnivores, meaning that their diets can also be supplemented by various small insects, for instance.

== Examples ==
The majority of birds in the Psittacine family are florivores, which includes most parrots, parakeets, macaws, and cockatoos. Other notable florivores are hummingbirds, sparrows, and toucans. The crab-eating macaque acts as an invasive florivore in Mauritius, where it forages voraciously on flowers of native plants, including the endangered, endemic Roussea simplex.

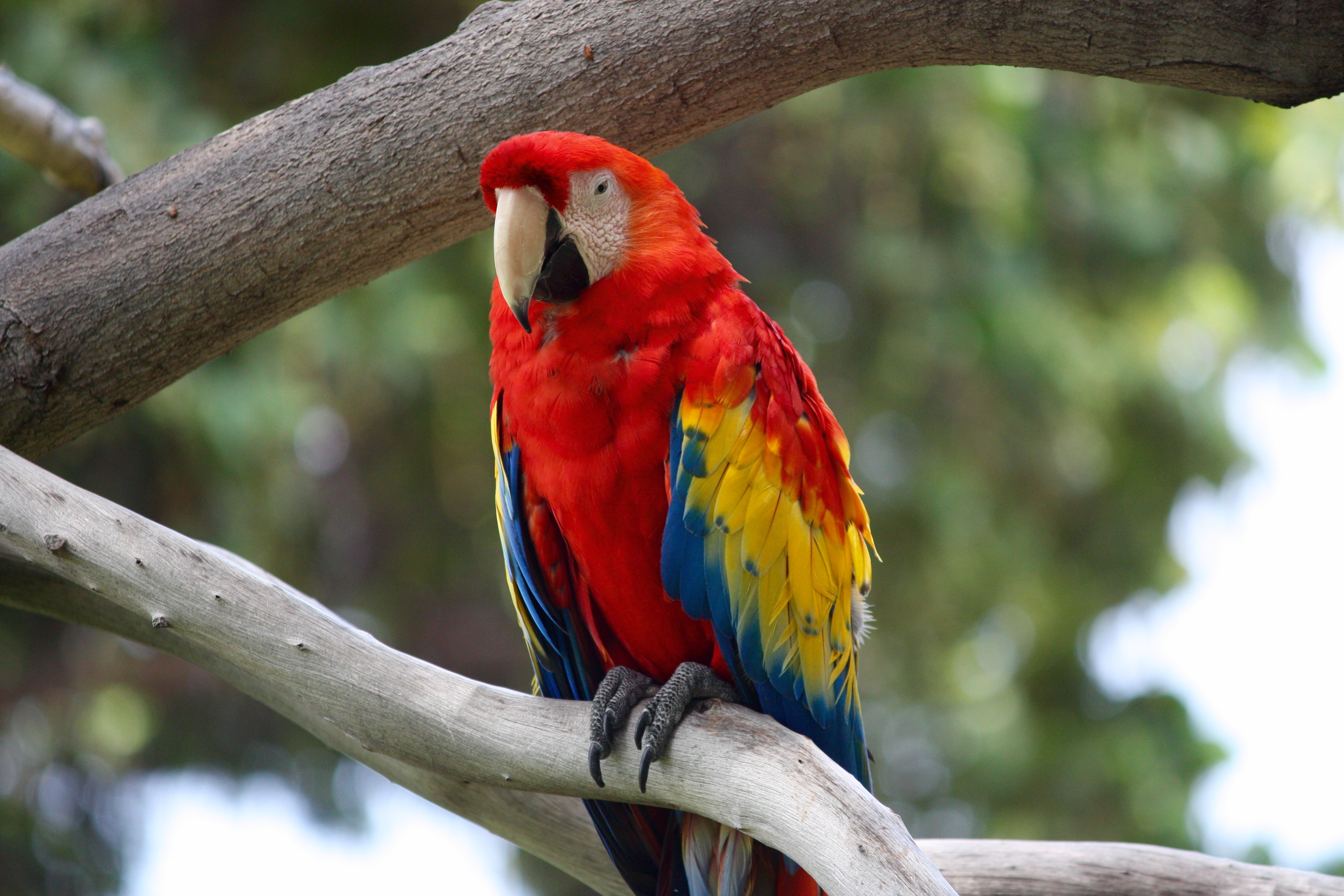
The parrot: many are florivores, yet some are omnivores.

== See also ==
- Herbivore
- Frugivore
- Nectarivore
- Palynivore
- Granivore

== Bibliography ==
- Approaches to Plant Evolutionary Ecology by G.P. Cheplick
- Poultry Nutrition: A Comparative Approach by K. C. Klasing (Department of animal science, University of California, Davis, California 95616, 2005)
