= Geinitzia (plant) =

Geinitzia Temporal range: Late Permian?-late Cretaceous ~260–66 Ma

Scientific classification
- Kingdom: Plantae
- Clade: Tracheophytes
- Clade: Gymnospermae
- Division: Pinophyta
- Class: Pinopsida
- Order: Pinales
- Genus: †Geinitzia; Endlicher 1847

Species
- see text

Extinct genus of conifer

Geinitzia is an extinct genus of conifers, with an uncertain position within the group, yet has been considered to be part of its own family, Geinitziaceae. The definition of the taxon is complex, a two options are managed:

- Accepted in the interpretation of the form-genus/morphogenus, and so with specimens tougth the Late Paleozoic–Mesozoic of Europe.
- Accepted as a natural genus of Cretaceous-Tertiary conifers.

Species belonging to the genus mostly lived in the late Cretaceous and have been found in Argentina, Germany (7) and other sites in Europe

== Species ==
A number of species have been described in Geinitzia.

Geinitzia cretacea
Geinitzia formosa
Geinitzia reichenbachii
Geinitzia schlotheimii
