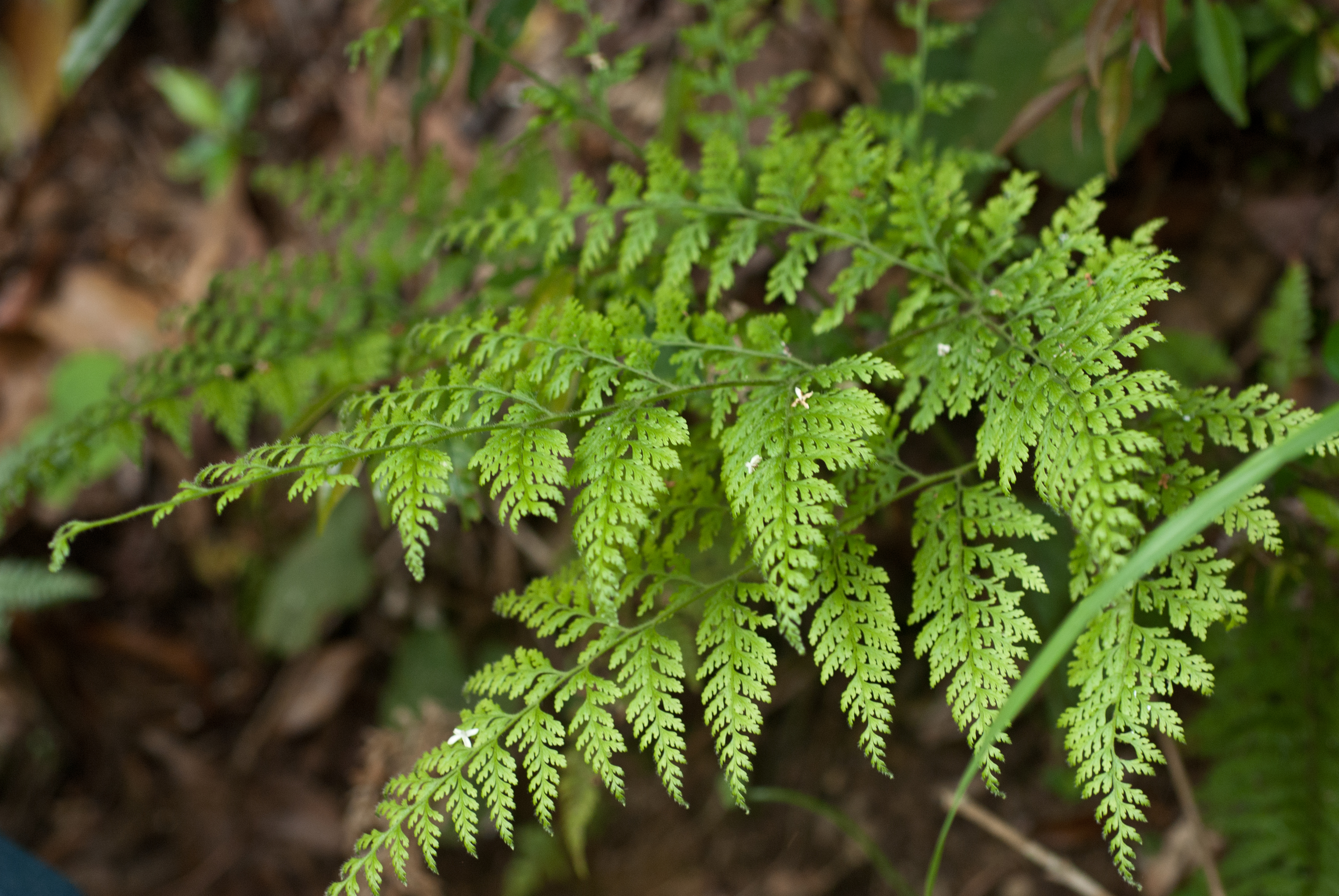
- Dennstaedtia zeylanica

Scientific classification
- Kingdom: Plantae
- Clade: Tracheophytes
- Division: Polypodiophyta
- Class: Polypodiopsida
- Order: Polypodiales
- Family: Dennstaedtiaceae
- Genus: Dennstaedtia; Bernh. (1801), nom. cons.

Type species
- Dennstaedtia flaccida (J.R.Forst.) Bernh.

Synonyms
- Costaricia Christ (1909); Litolobium Newman (1854 publ. 1857); Oenotrichia Copel. (1929); Paradennstaedtia Tagawa (1952); Patania C.Presl (1836)

= Dennstaedtia =

Genus of ferns

Dennstaedtia is a mostly tropical and subtropical group of ferns described as a genus in 1801. Hayscented fern, or cup ferns, are common names for some species in this genus. It includes 58 species native to the tropical Americas, Madagascar, southern and eastern Asia, Australia, New Guinea, and the Pacific Islands.

Some characteristics of Dennstaedtia: "Fronds homomorphic; stipe grooved above, hairy when young... lamina triangular to oblong, many times pinnate, usually densely hairy, especially on rachis... Veins free, pinnately branching, veinlet not reaching margin, with hydathode at apex. Sori orbicular, marginal, terminal on each veinlet, separate..."

The temperate North-American hay-scented fern, Sitobolium punctilobulum, was formerly classified in Dennstaedtia and may have been its best-known member. It forms extensive clonal ground-cover colonies on level surfaces in the Appalachian area.

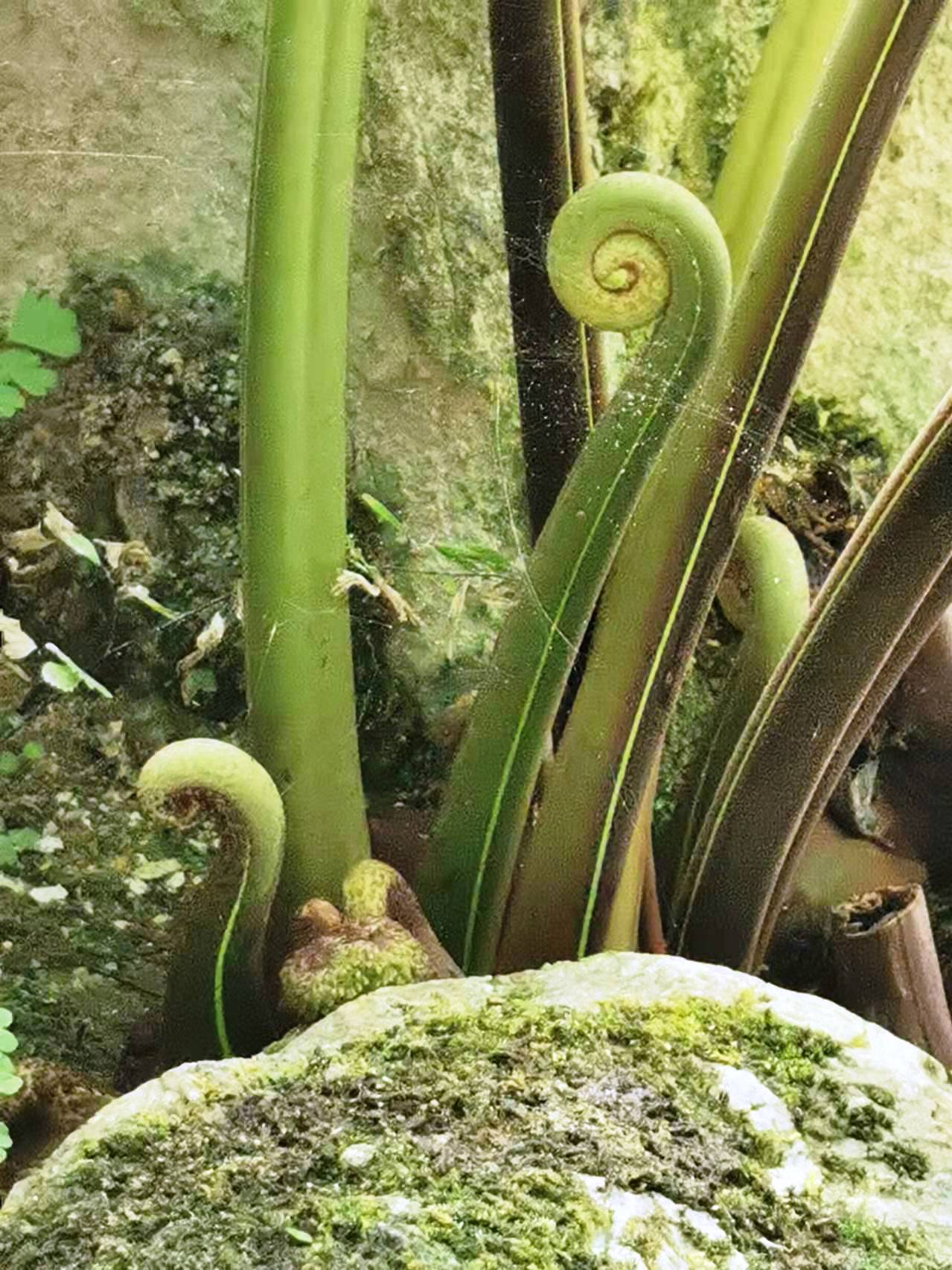
Groove on the stipe.D. smithii, with a vertical white line on either side of the groove.

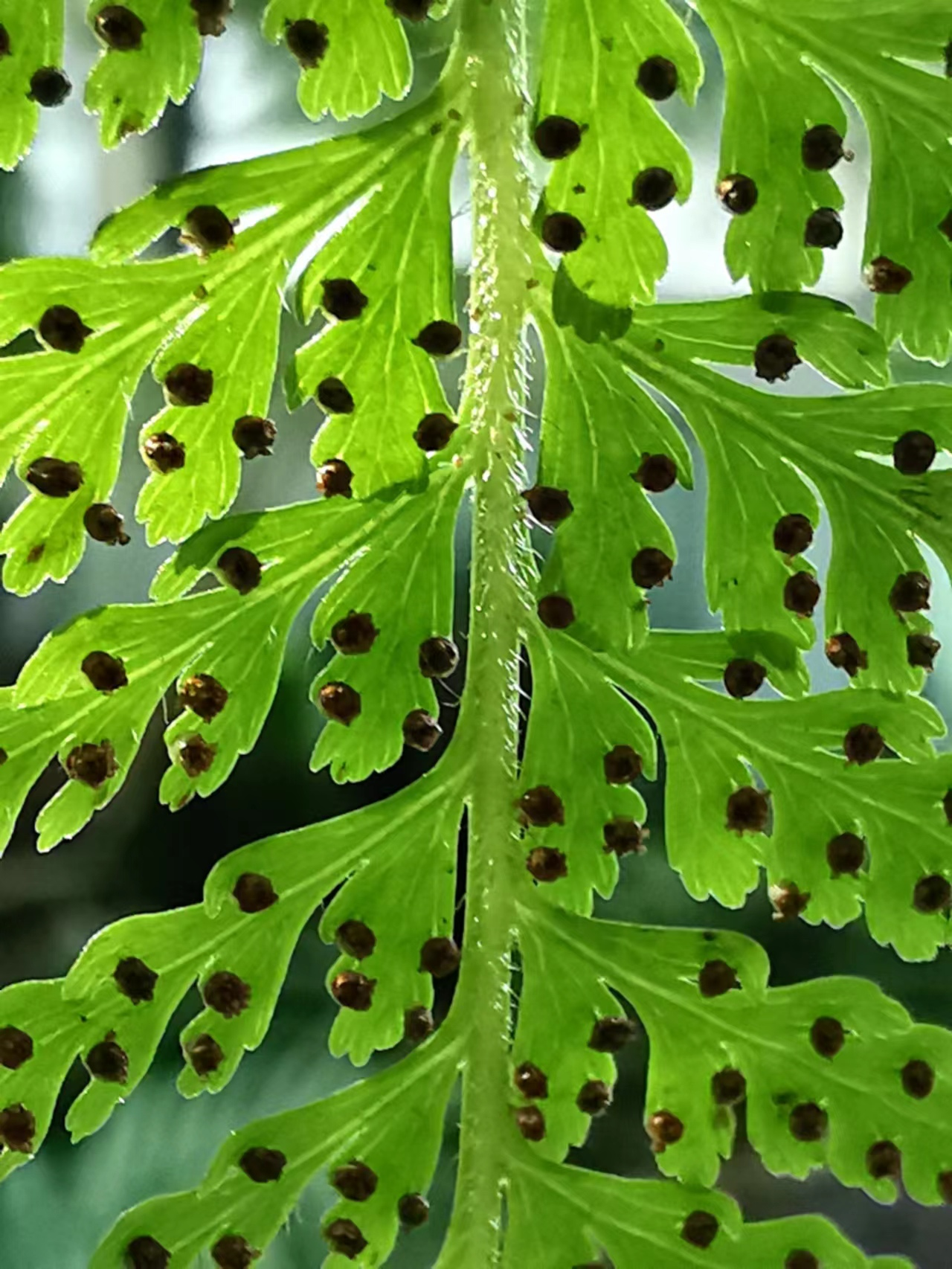
Sori and pinnules.D. smithii

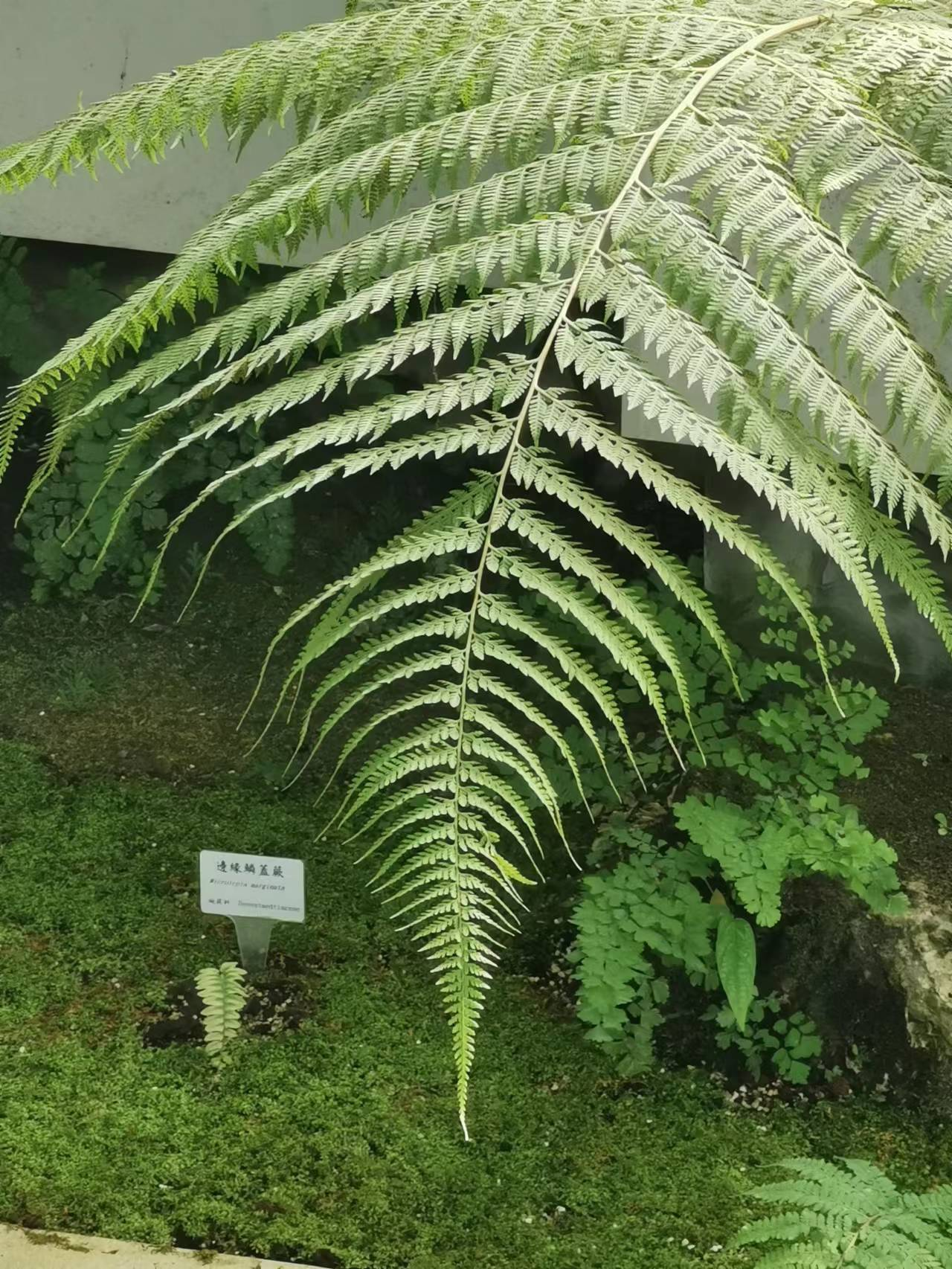
Fronds multipinnate. D. smithii

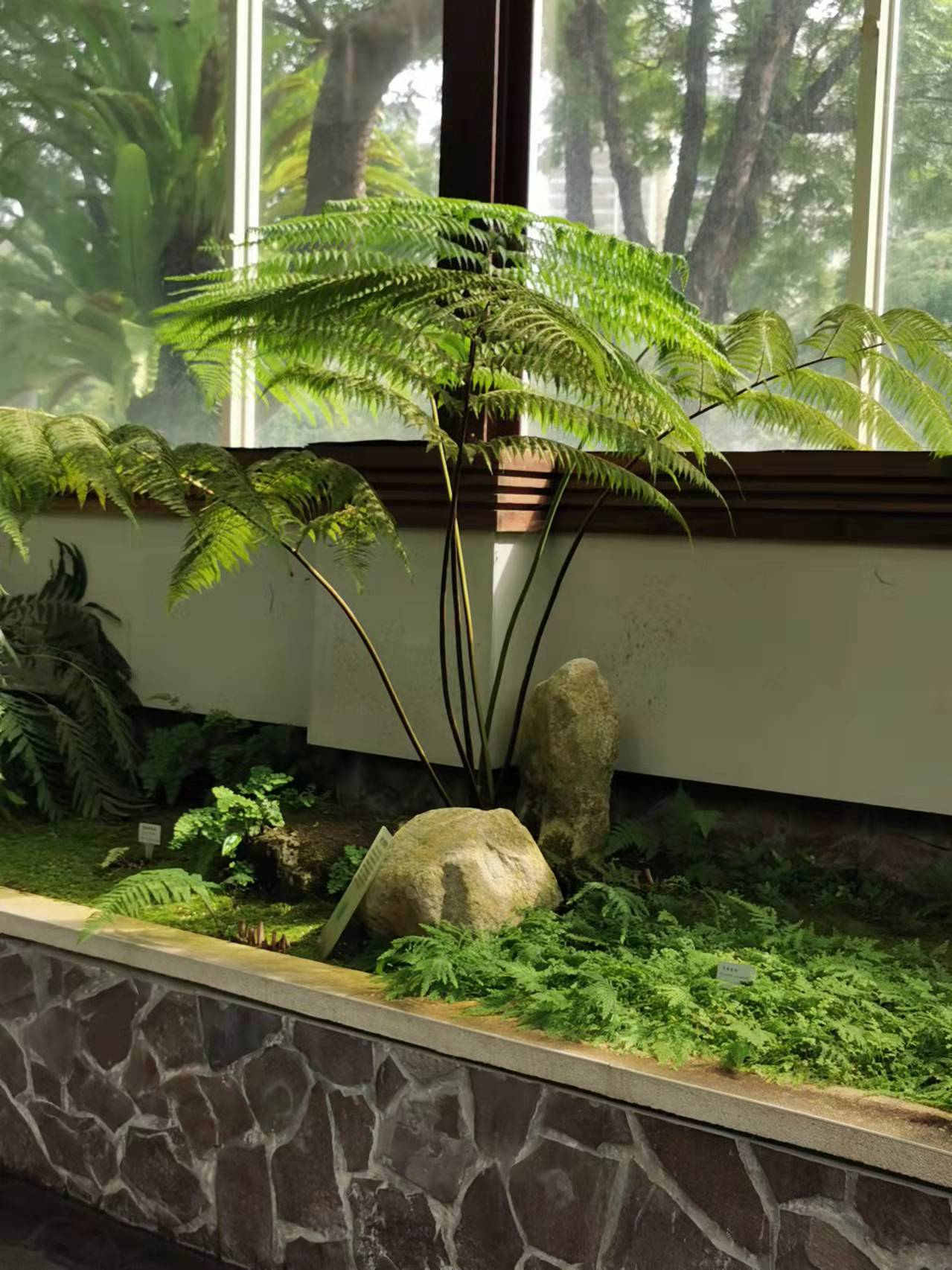
A fern in the Dennstaedtia can reach two meters in height such as D. smithii.

== Species ==
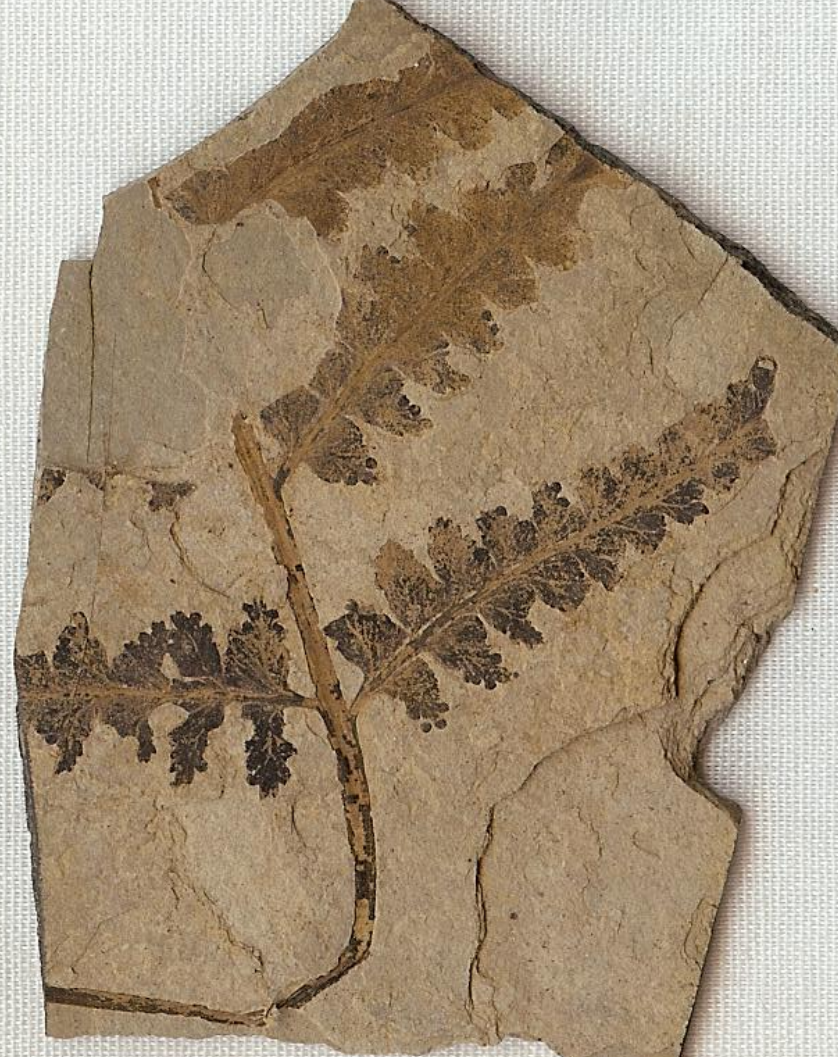
Dennstaedtia christophelii holotype fossil

Species include:

- D. ampla (Bak.) Bedd.
- D. anthriscifolia (Bory) Moore
- D. antillensis (Jenm.) C.Chr.
- D. appendiculata (Wall. ex Hook.) J.Sm.
- D. arborescens (Willd.) E.Ekman ex Maxon
- D. arcuata Maxon
- D. articulata Copel.
- D. auriculata Navarrete & B.Øllg.
- D. axilaris A.Rojas
- D. bipinnata (Cav.) Maxon
- D. canaliculata Alderw.
- †D. christophelii Pigg et al (Ypresian, NW North America)
- D. cicutaria (Sw.) T.Moore
- D. cornuta (Kaulf.) Mett.
- D. davallioides (R.Br.) Moore
- D. dennstaedtioides Copel.
- D. dissecta (Sw.) Moore
- D. distenta (Kunze) T.Moore
- D. elmeri Copel.
- D. flaccida (Forst.) Bernh.
- D. fusca Copel.
- D. glabrata (Ces.) C.Chr.
- D. glauca (Cav.) C.Chr.
- D. globulifera (Poir.) Hier.
- D. hirsuta (Sw.) Mett. ex Miq.
- D. hooveri Christ
- D. inermis (Baker) Brownlie
- D. macgregori Copel.
- D. macrosora Navarrete & B.Øllg.
- D. madagascariensis (Kunze) Tardieu
- D. magnifica Copel.
- D. mathewsii C.Chr.
- D. merrillii Copel.
- D. novoguineensis (Rosenst.) Alston
- D. obtusifolia (Willd.) T.Moore
- D. parksii Copeland ex Morton
- D. paucirrhiza Navarrete & B.Øllg.
- D. penicillifera Alderw.
- D. philippinensis Copel.
- D. producta Mett.
- D. remota (Christ) Diels
- D. rectangularis A.Rojas
- D. resinifera (BI.) Mett. ex Kuhn
- D. riparia A.Rojas
- D. rufidula C. Chr.
- D. samoensis (Brackenr.) Moore
- D. scandens (Blume) T.Moore
- D. shawii Copel.
- D. smithii (Hook.) Moore
- D. spinosa Mickel
- D. sprucei Moore
- D. sumatrana Alderw.
- D. terminalis Alderw.
- D. tryoniana Navarrete & B.Øllg.
- D. vagans (Bak.) Diels
- D. werckleana (Christ) Navarrete & B.Øllg.
- D. wercklei (H. Christ) R.M.Tryon
- D. wilfordii (T.Moore) Christ
- D. williamsii Copel.
- D. zeylanica (Sw.) Zink ex Fraser-Jenk. & Kandel
