= Cynodontium =

Scientific classification
- Kingdom: Plantae
- Clade: Embryophytes
- Division: Bryophyta
- Class: Bryopsida
- Subclass: Dicranidae
- Order: Dicranales
- Family: Dicranaceae
- Genus: Cynodontium; Bruch & Schimp.

Genus of mosses

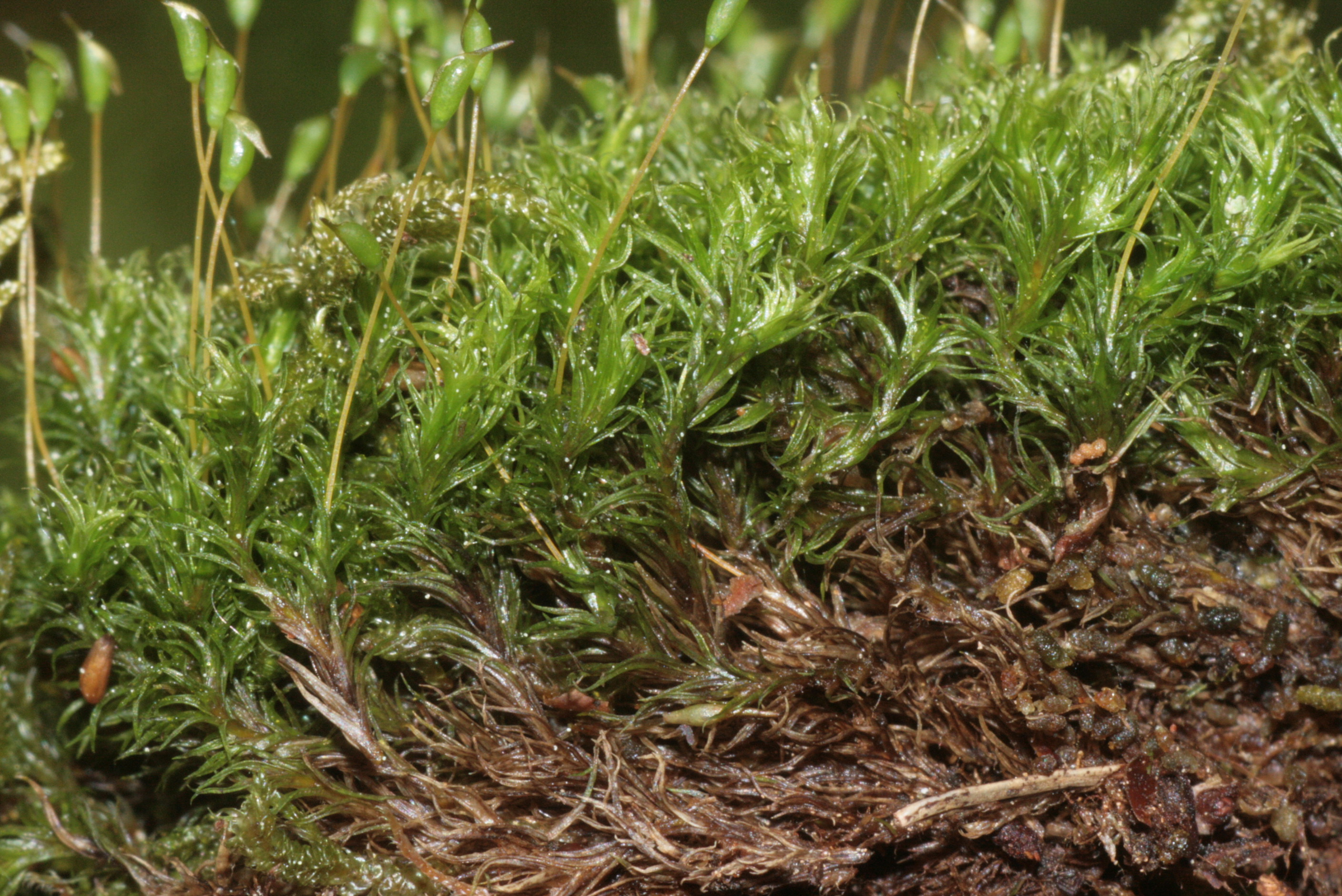
Cynodontium polycarpon

Cynodontium is a genus of mosses belonging to the family Dicranaceae.

Species:

- Cynodontium alpestre (Wahlenb.) Milde
- Cynodontium asperifolium (Lindb. ex Arnell) Paris
- Cynodontium bogotense Hampe
