= Fructification =

Fructification (Latin: fructificatio) are the generative parts of the plant (flower and fruit) (as opposed to its vegetative parts: trunk, roots and leaves). Sometimes it is applied more broadly to the generative parts of gymnosperms, ferns, horsetails, and lycophytes, though they produce neither fruit nor flower.

Since the works of Andrea Caesalpino (1519–1603) the characters of fructification have been extensively used as a basis for the scientific classification of plants. Carl Linnaeus (1707–1778) raised the description of the parts of fructification to an unprecedented level of precision. He insisted that genera and the higher groups of plants must be characterised in terms of the fructification alone without using vegetative parts (which can be used only to characterise the species within genera). At that time it was believed that all plants have flowers and fruits. It was not until the nineteenth century that the important difference between seeds and spores was recognised and the use of terms flower and fruit was restricted to the flowering plants (angiosperms).

Later plant taxonomists used a more balanced approach and re-introduced the use of the vegetative parts of the plant as a basis for characters at different levels of taxonomic hierarchy.
