= Fiddlehead =

Fronds of a young fern

Fiddlehead ferns

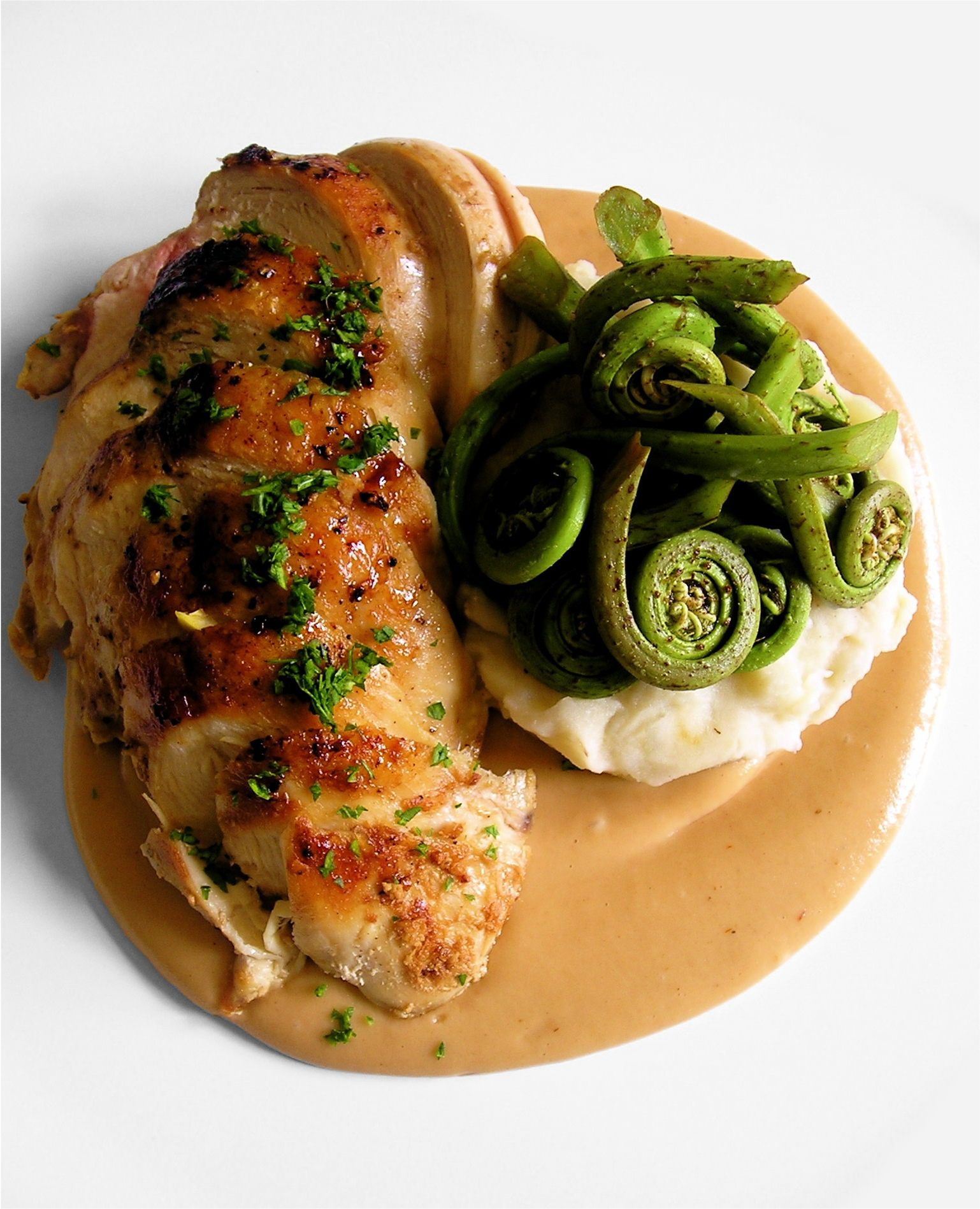
A chicken dish including fiddleheads

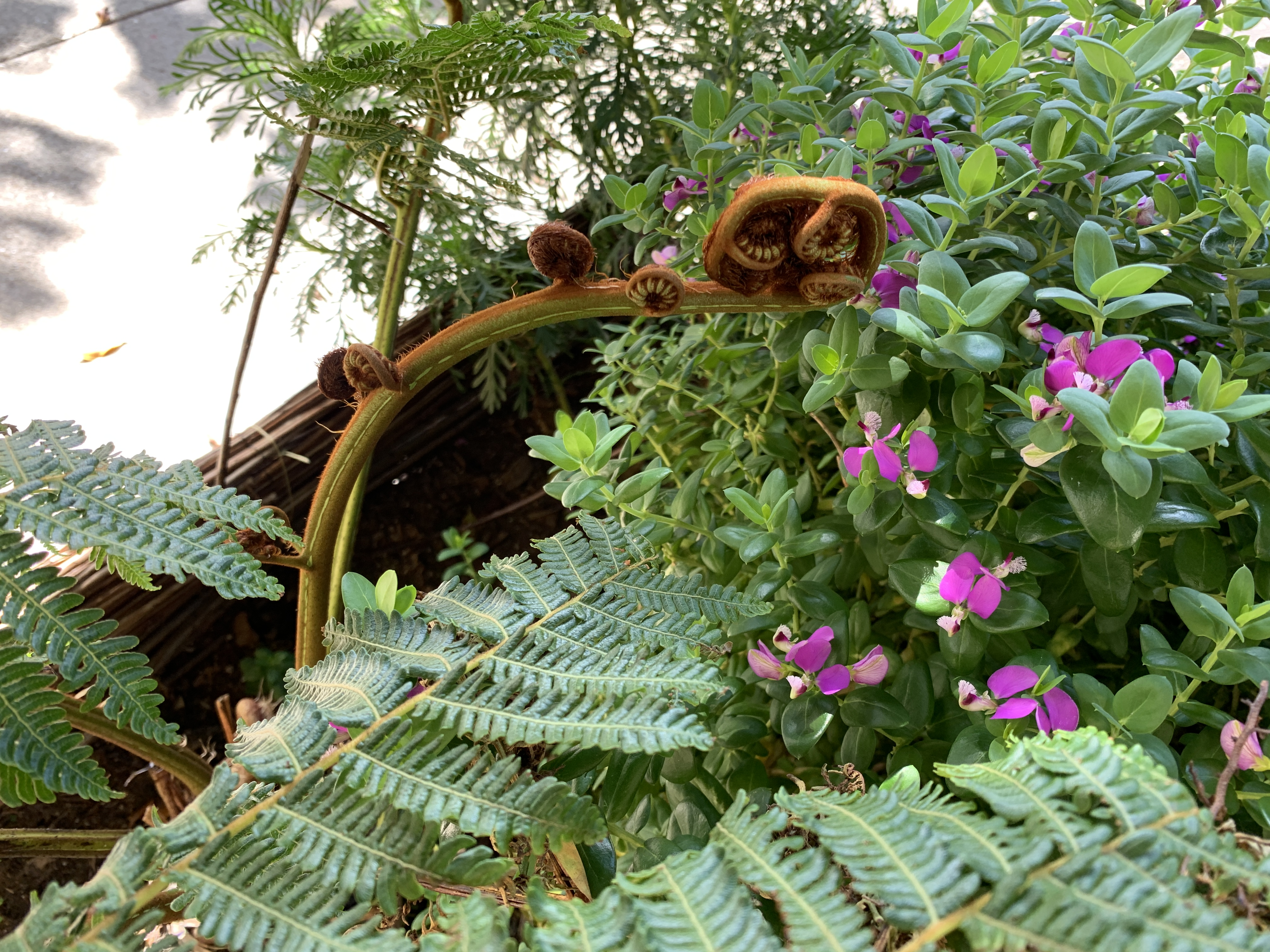
Fiddleheads growing

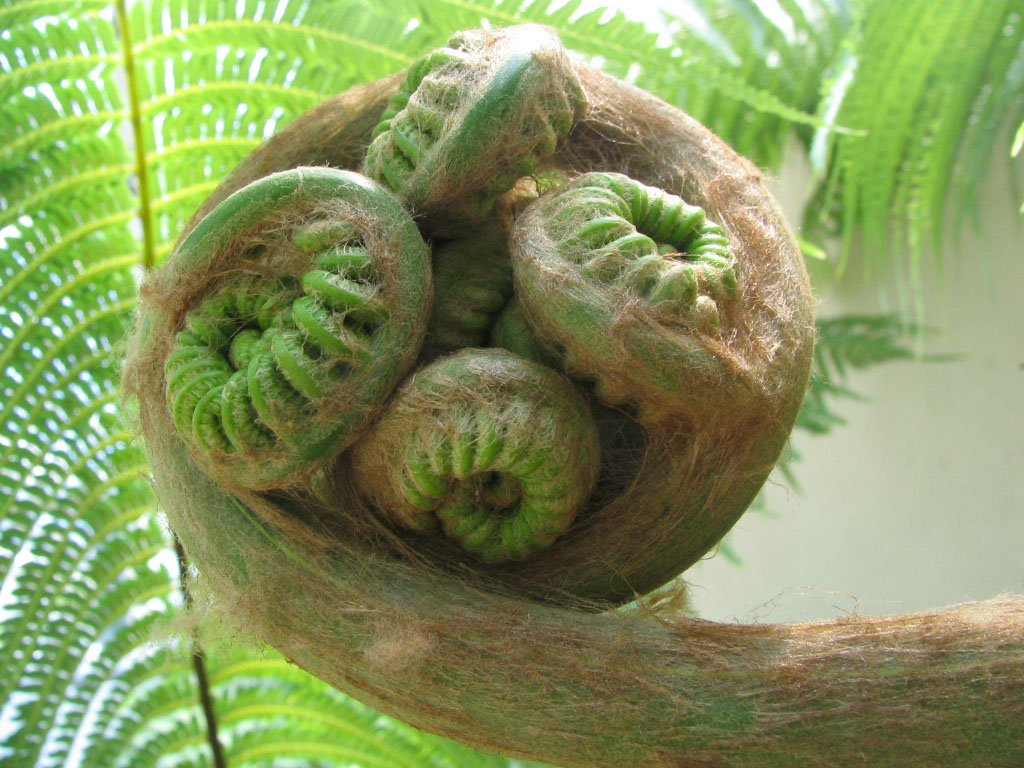

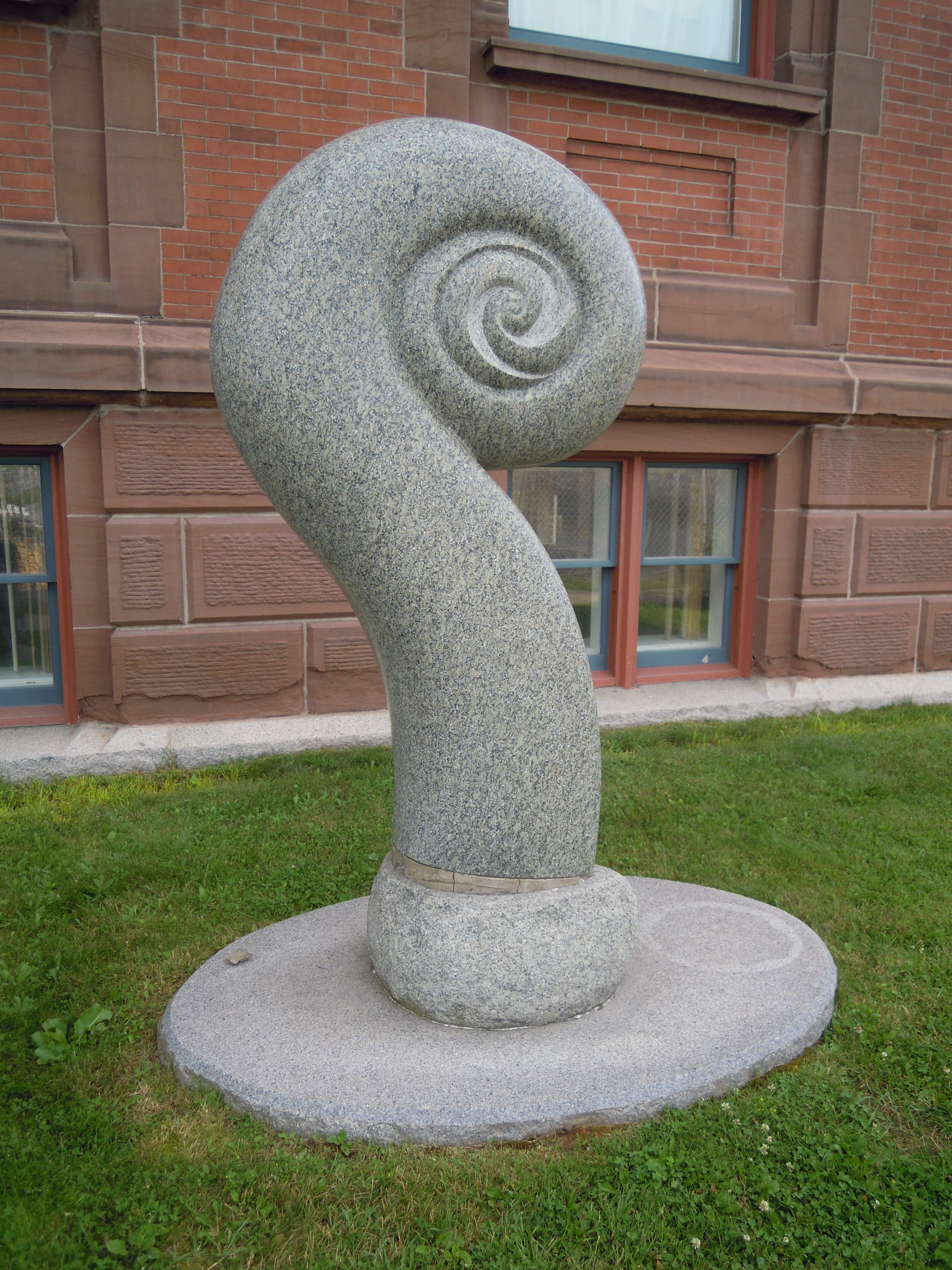
Fiddlehead sculpture at the Saint John Arts Centre by sculptor Jim Boyd in Saint John, New Brunswick, Canada

Fiddleheads or fiddlehead greens are the furled fronds from a fledgling fern, harvested for use as a vegetable.

Left on the plant, each fiddlehead would unroll into a new frond (circinate vernation). As fiddleheads are harvested early in the season, before the frond has opened and reached its full height, they are cut fairly close to the ground.

Fiddleheads from brackens contain ptaquiloside, a compound associated with bracken toxicity, and thiaminase. Not all species contain ptaquiloside, such as Diplazium esculentum, a fern with fiddleheads regularly consumed in parts of East Asia, which differs from bracken (Pteridium aquilinum).

The fiddlehead resembles the curled ornamentation (called a scroll) on the end of a stringed instrument, such as a fiddle. It is also called a crozier, after the curved staff used by bishops, which has its origins in the shepherd's crook.

== Varieties ==
The fiddleheads of certain ferns are eaten as a cooked leaf vegetable. The most popular of these are:

- Bracken, Pteridium aquilinum, found worldwide (Toxic if not cooked fully)
- Ostrich fern, Matteuccia struthiopteris, found in northern regions worldwide, and the central/eastern part of North America (See health warning)
- Lady fern, Athyrium filix-femina, throughout most of the temperate northern hemisphere.
- Cinnamon fern or buckhorn fern, Osmunda cinnamomea, found in the eastern parts of North America, although not so palatable as ostrich fern.
- Royal fern, Osmunda regalis, found worldwide
- Midin, or Stenochlaena palustris, found in Sarawak, where it is prized as a local delicacy
- Zenmai or flowering fern, Osmunda japonica, found in East Asia
- Vegetable fern, Athyrium esculentum, found throughout Asia and Oceania

Fiddleheads' ornamental value makes them very expensive in the temperate regions where they are not abundant.

== Sources and harvesting ==
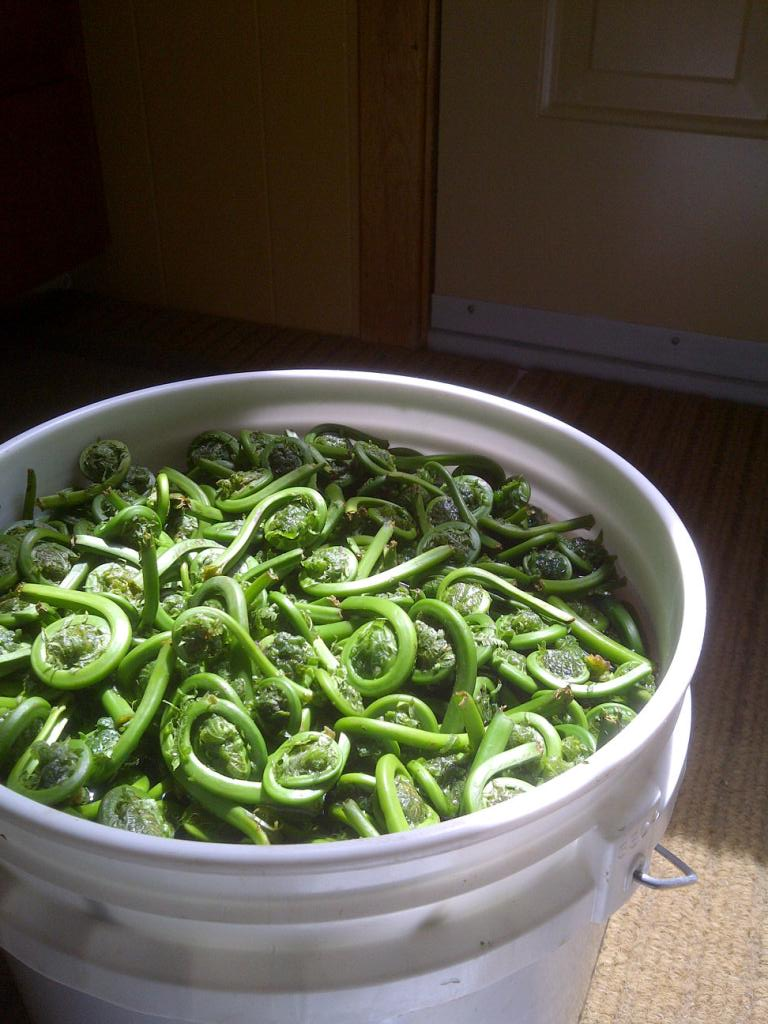
Bucket of newly collected fiddleheads

Available seasonally, fiddleheads are both foraged and commercially harvested in spring. When picking fiddleheads, it is recommended to take only one third the tops per plant/cluster for sustainable harvest. Each plant produces several tops that turn into fronds.

== Culinary uses ==
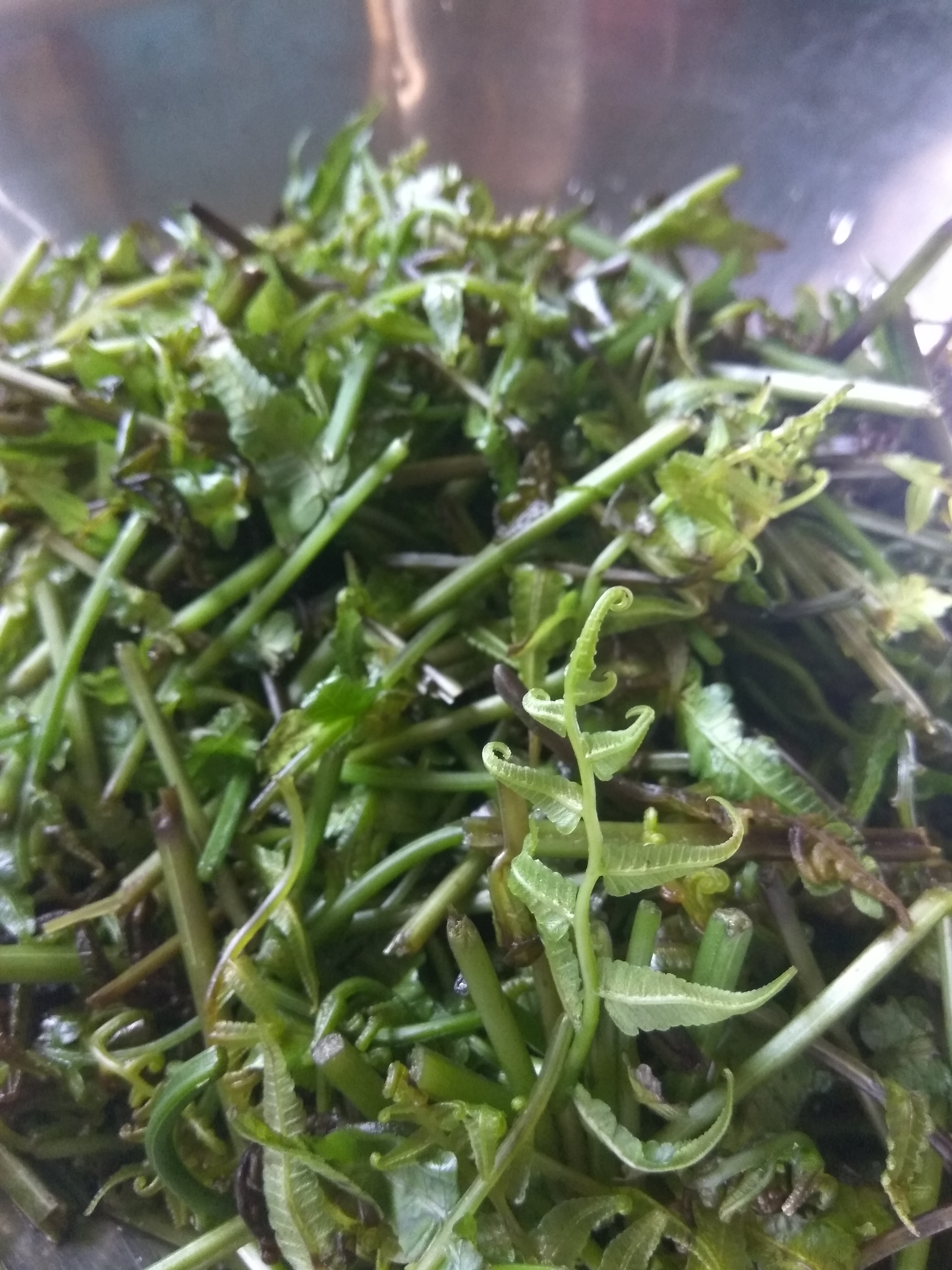
Fiddlehead fern as a vegetable

Fiddleheads have been part of traditional diets in much of Northern France since the beginning of the Middle Ages, across Asia, and also among Native Americans for centuries. They are also part of the diet in the Russian Far East where they are often picked in the wild in autumn, preserved in salt over winter, and then consumed in spring.

=== Asian cuisine ===
In Indonesia, young fiddlehead ferns are cooked in a rich coconut sauce spiced with chili pepper, galangal, lemongrass, turmeric leaves and other spices. This dish is called gulai pakis or gulai paku, and originated from the Minangkabau ethnic group of Indonesia.

In the Philippines, young fronds of Diplazium esculentum or pakô are often made into a salad with tomato, salted egg slices, and a simple vinaigrette dressing.

In East Asia, fiddleheads of bracken (Pteridium aquilinum) are eaten as a vegetable, called kogomi (コゴミ) in Japan, gosari (고사리) in Korea, and juécài (蕨菜) in China and Taiwan.

In Korea, a typical banchan (small side dish) is gosari-namul (고사리나물), which consists of prepared fernbrake fiddleheads that have been sauteed. It is also a component of the popular dish bibimbap, yukgaejang, and bindae-tteok. On Jeju Island, the southernmost island of South Korea, collecting it in April to May is a convention.

In Japan, bracken fiddleheads are a prized dish, and roasting the fiddleheads is reputed to neutralize any toxins in the vegetable. In Japan, fiddleheads of flowering fern (Osmunda japonica), known as zenmai (薇), as well as those of the ostrich fern (Matteuccia struthiopteris), known as kogomi (コゴミ), are commonly eaten in springtime. Fiddleheads in Japan are considered sansai, or wild vegetables. They are also traditionally used to make warabimochi, a Japanese-style dessert.

=== Indian cuisine ===
In the Indian subcontinent, it is found in the Himalayan states of North and Northeast India. In the state of Tripura, it is known as muikhonchok in the Kokborok language. As part of the Tripuri cuisine; fiddlehead fern is prepared by stir frying as bhaja served as a side dish. In Manipur it is known as 'Chekoh' in the local Thadou language. It is usually eaten stir fried with chicken, eggs, prawns or other proteins.

In Mandi (Himachal Pradesh) it is called Lingad and used for vegetable pickling. In the Kullu Valley in Himachal Pradesh, it is known locally as lingri and is used to make a pickle lingri ka achaar. In the Kangra Valley it is called lungdu in the Kangri dialect and is eaten as a vegetable. In Chamba it is known as "kasrod". In Kumaon division of Uttarakhand, it is called limbra. In Garhwal division of Uttarakhand, it is called linguda(लिंगुड़ा) and eaten as a vegetable. In Darjeeling and Sikkim regions, it is called niyuro (नियुरो) and is common as a vegetable side dish, often mixed with local cheese and sometimes pickled. In Southern regions of West Bengal it is known as dheki shaak or dheki shaag.

In Assam, it is known as dhekia xak (Assamese: ঢেকীয়া শাক); there it is a popular side dish. In the area of Jammu in Jammu and Kashmir, it's known as kasrod (कसरोड). The most famous Dogra dish is kasrod ka achaar (fiddlehead fern pickle). In Poonch, it is known as 'Kandor'(कंडोर) in local language. In Kishtwar, it is known as ted (टेड‍‌) in the local language Kishtwari. It is also cooked as a dry vegetable side dish to be eaten with rotis or parathas. In Ramban district of Jammu and Kashmir, it is called "DheeD" in Khah language.

=== Nepali cuisine ===
In Nepal, it is a seasonal food called niyuro (नियुरो) or niuro (निउरो). There are three varieties of fiddlehead most commonly found in Nepali cuisine, namely सेती निउरो having whitish green stem, काली निउरो having dark purple stem, and ठूलो निउरो having large green stems. It is served as a vegetable side dish, often cooked in local clarified butter. It is also pickled.

=== North American cooking ===
Ostrich ferns (Matteuccia struthiopteris), known locally as "fiddleheads", grow wild in wet areas of northeastern North America in spring. The Maliseet, Mi'kmaq, and Penobscot peoples of Eastern Canada and Maine have traditionally harvested fiddleheads, and the vegetable was introduced first to the Acadian settlers in the early 18th century, and later to United Empire Loyalists as they began settling in New Brunswick in the 1780s. Fiddleheads remain a traditional dish in these regions, with most commercial harvesting occurring in New Brunswick, Quebec and Maine, and the vegetable is considered particularly emblematic of New Brunswick. North America's largest grower, packer and distributor of wild fiddleheads established Ontario's first commercial fiddlehead farm in Port Colborne in 2006. Fiddlehead-producing areas are also located in Nova Scotia, Vermont and New Hampshire. The Canadian village of Tide Head, New Brunswick bills itself as the "Fiddlehead Capital of the World."

Fiddleheads are sold fresh and frozen. Fresh fiddleheads are available in the market for only a few weeks in springtime, and are fairly expensive. Pickled and frozen fiddleheads, however, can be found in some shops year-round. The vegetable is typically steamed, boiled and/or sautéed before being eaten hot, with hollandaise sauce, butter, lemon, vinegar and/or garlic, or chilled in salad or with mayonnaise.

To cook fiddleheads, it is advised to remove the brown papery husk before washing in several changes of cold water, then boil or steam them. Boiling reduces the bitterness and the content of tannins and toxins. The Centers for Disease Control and Prevention associated a number of food-borne illness cases with fiddleheads in the early 1990s. Although they did not identify a toxin in the fiddleheads, the findings of that case suggest that fiddleheads should be cooked thoroughly before eating. The cooking time recommended by health authorities is 15 minutes if boiled and 10 to 12 minutes if steamed. The cooking method recommended by gourmets is to spread a thin layer in a steam basket and steam lightly, just until tender crisp.

=== Māori cuisine ===
Māori people have historically eaten young fern shoots called pikopiko, which can refer to several species of New Zealand ferns.

== Constituents ==
Fiddleheads are low in sodium, but rich in potassium.

Many ferns also contain the enzyme thiaminase, which breaks down thiamine. This can lead to beriberi, if consumed in extreme excess.

Further, there is some evidence that certain varieties of fiddleheads, e.g. bracken (Pteridium genus), are toxic. It is recommended to fully cook fiddleheads to destroy the shikimic acid. Ostrich fern (Matteuccia struthiopteris) is not thought to cause cancer, although there is evidence it contains a toxin unidentified as yet.

Consumption of raw or undercooked fiddlehead ferns may cause acute gastrointestinal symptoms including nausea, vomiting, diarrhea, and abdominal cramps, lasting 24 hours to three days. Bracken fern fiddleheads contain ptaquiloside, a carcinogen that forms DNA adducts and is associated with gastric and esophageal cancers in humans.

== See also ==
- Boyi and Shuqi: two Chinese princes who were said to have famously survived exile in the wilderness for a long while on a diet of fiddleheads
