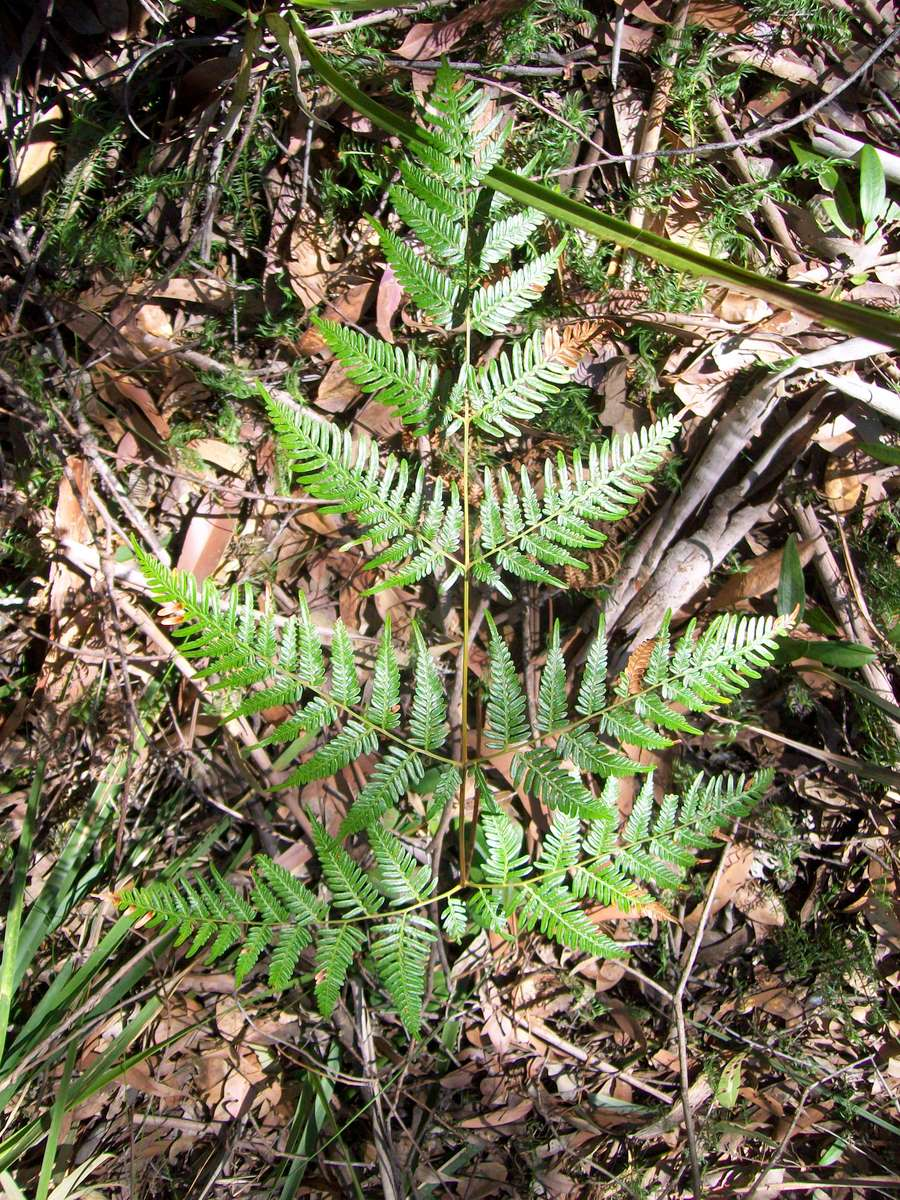
- Bracken at Chatswood West, Australia

Scientific classification
- Kingdom: Plantae
- Clade: Embryophytes
- Clade: Tracheophytes
- Division: Polypodiophyta
- Class: Polypodiopsida
- Order: Polypodiales
- Family: Dennstaedtiaceae
- Genus: Pteridium
- Species: P. esculentum

Binomial name
- Pteridium esculentum (G.Forst.) Cockayne

= Pteridium esculentum =

Species of plant

Pteridium esculentum, commonly known as bracken fern, austral bracken or simply bracken, is a species of the bracken genus native to a number of countries in the Southern Hemisphere. Although it is now known to contain the carcinogen ptaquiloside, the rhizome of the plant was a staple in traditional Māori diets in New Zealand and was eaten by Indigenous Australians.

== Description ==
Pteridium esculentum grows from creeping rhizomes, which are covered with reddish hair. From them arise single large roughly triangular fronds, which grow to 0.5–2 metres (1 ft 8 in – 6 ft 7 in) tall. The fronds are stiff with a brown stripe.

== Taxonomy ==
First described as Pteris esculenta by German botanist Georg Forster in 1786, it gained its current binomial name in 1908. Esculentum means edible.

== Distribution and habitat ==
It is found in all states of Australia apart from the Northern Territory, as well as New Zealand, Norfolk Island, Malaysia, Polynesia, and New Caledonia. Within Victoria it is widespread and common to altitudes of 1,000 m (3,300 ft). In New South Wales, it occurs across central, eastern and southern parts of the state. It can also be weedy and invade disturbed areas. In Western Australia, it grows near the southern and western coastlines, as far north as Geraldton. In Queensland, it is found in many locations.

== Ecology ==
Like its Northern Hemisphere relatives, P. esculentum is very quick to colonise disturbed areas and can outcompete other plants to form a dense understorey. It is often treated as a weed. It does create a more humid sheltered microclimate under its leaves and is food for a variety of native insects. Two species of fruit fly (Drosophila) were recorded in a field study near Sydney. Another study near Sydney yielded 17 herbivorous arthropods (15 insects and two mites), notable for the lack of Hymenoptera (ants, bees, wasps, and sawflies) and beetles.

== Adverse health impacts ==
Pteridium esculentum contains the known bracken carcinogen ptaquiloside. Concentrations of ptaquiloside in bracken in New Zealand vary greatly, and in a high proportion of stands ptaquiloside is not found. A higher incidence of ptaquiloside, and some very high concentrations, are found in areas where bovine enzootic haematuria and/or acute haemorrhagic syndrome was known to occur. Traditional Māori cooking techniques may have lessened the content of ptaquiloside.

Pteridium esculentum contains silica structures, which over time can grind down teeth, something seen in many Māori archaeological sites. The plant is also known to cause constipation.

== Uses ==
=== In Māori culture ===
The Māori of New Zealand used the rhizomes of Pteridium esculentum (aruhe) as a staple food, especially for exploring or hunting groups away from permanent settlements; much of the widespread distribution of this species in present-day New Zealand is in fact a consequence of prehistoric deforestation and subsequent tending of aruhe stands on rich soils (which produced the best rhizomes). Aruhe, alongside kūmara (sweet potato), was often the primary carbohydrate in traditional Māori diets, especially in southern New Zealand, where traditional Pacific crops were not able to be grown in the temperate climate. The plant was associated with communing with atua (gods), especially Haumia-tiketike, the god of uncultivated plants, and was often associated with war, as the plant could be transported easily by warriors.

The plant is very important in traditional Māori life that many names are given for its many forms: aruhe alone refers to the rhizome, roi its roasted product, rauaruhe for fronts, and new shoots are known by the name mōkehu; the entire plant is known as rārahu, rarauhe and rahurahu. The name aruhe is used in other Polynesian languages to refer to species of fern.

The rhizomes were air-dried so that they could be stored and became lighter; for consumption, they were briefly heated and then softened with a pounder (patu); the starch could then be sucked from the fibers by each diner, or collected if it were to be prepared for a larger feast. Patu aruhe were significant items and several distinct styles were developed.

Aruhe could be roasted then eaten plain, mashed into a porridge with harakeke nectar, or cooked alongside meats and seafood.

=== In Indigenous Australian culture ===
The Eora people of the Sydney region knew it as gurgi. Indigenous people in Australia ate the roots after they were pounded into a paste and roasted.
