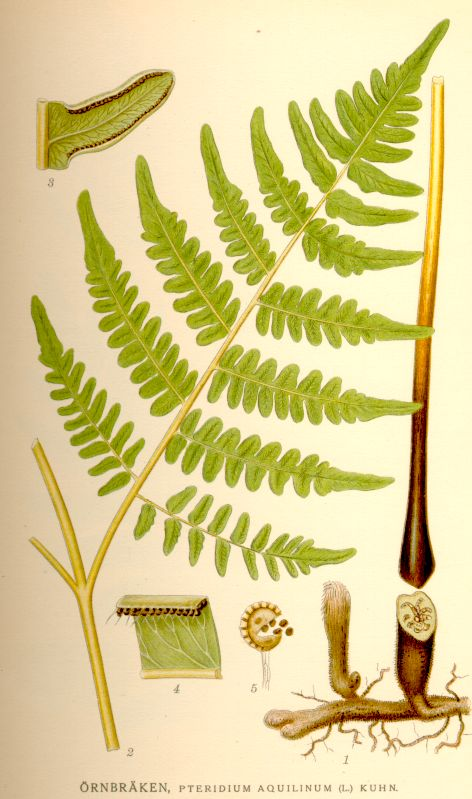
- Pteridium aquilinum

Scientific classification
- Kingdom: Plantae
- Clade: Tracheophytes
- Division: Polypodiophyta
- Class: Polypodiopsida
- Order: Polypodiales
- Family: Dennstaedtiaceae
- Genus: Pteridium; Gled. ex Scop. 1760 not Raf. 1814 (Pteridaceae)

Species
- See text

= Bracken =

Bracken Temporal range: Paleogene-Recent, 55–0 Ma

Genus of ferns

Bracken (Pteridium) is a genus of large, cosmopolitan, coarse ferns in the family Dennstaedtiaceae. Brackens are noted for their large, highly divided fronds and are found on all continents except Antarctica; their typical habitat is moorland. The word bracken is of Old Norse origin, related to Swedish bräken and Danish bregne, both meaning fern. In the past, the genus was commonly treated as having only one species, Pteridium aquilinum, but the current trend is to subdivide it into about ten species. Like other ferns, brackens reproduce by spores rather than seeds or fruit. The immature fronds, known as fiddleheads, are sometimes eaten, although some contain carcinogenic compounds.

== Description ==
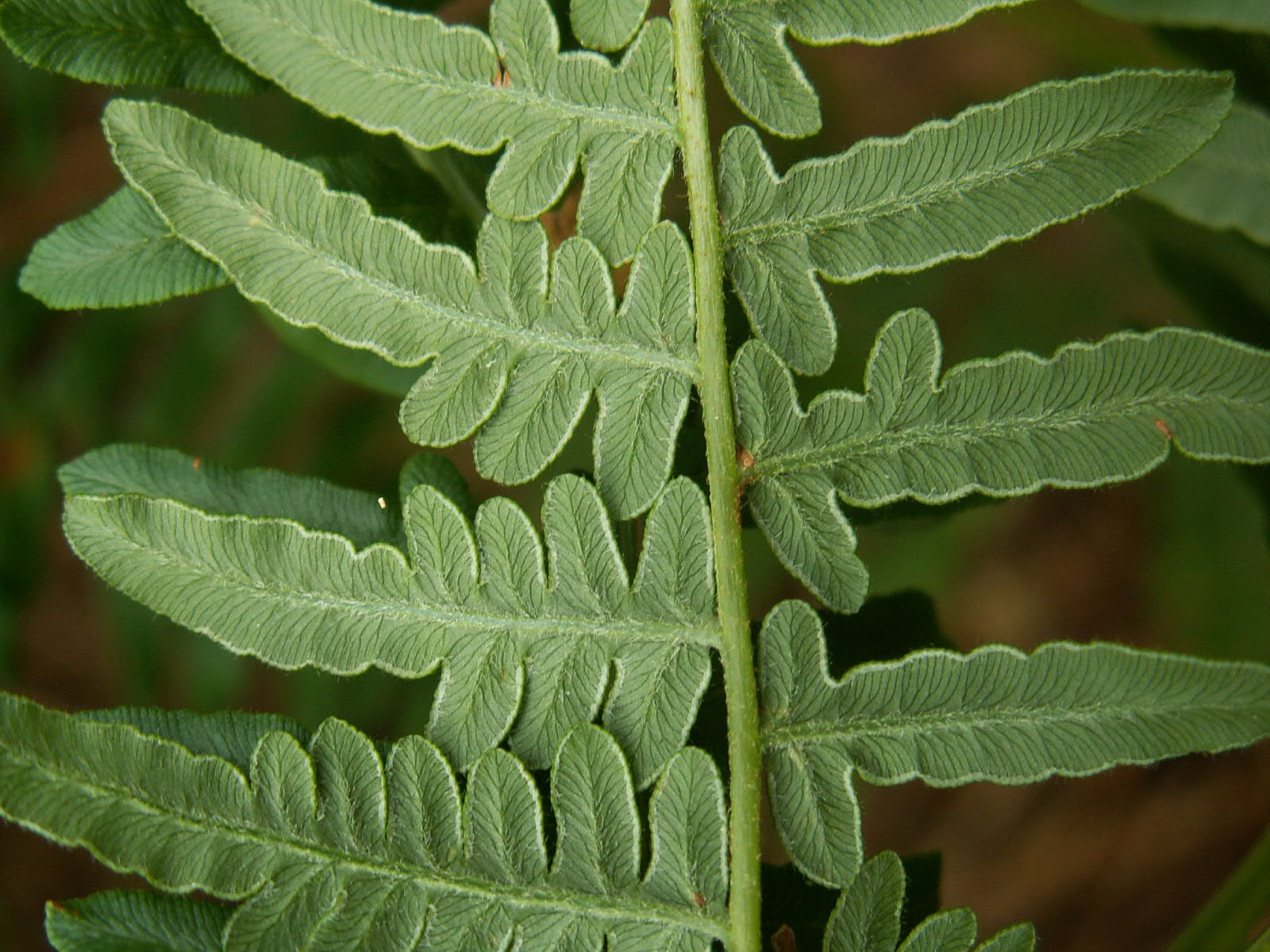
Sori (paler green) along outer edge on underside of leaves

Bracken is one of the oldest ferns, with fossil records from the Eocene period 55 million years old having been found. The plant sends up large, triangular fronds from a wide-creeping underground rootstock, and may form dense thickets. This rootstock may travel a metre or more underground between fronds. The fronds may grow up to 2.5 m (8 ft) long or longer with support, but typically are in the range of 0.6–2 m (2–6 1/2 ft) high. In cold environments, bracken is deciduous and, as it requires well-drained soil, is generally found growing on the sides of hills.

Fern spores are contained in structures found on the underside of the leaf called the sori. The sori of bracken are located in a line next to the leaf-edge and are distinctly different from those in most other ferns, where the sori are circular and occur towards the centre of the leaf.

== Species ==
As of August 2026, Plants of the World Online accepted 20 species:

Image	Scientific name	Distribution
	Pteridium aquilinum (L.) Kuhn	Macaronesia, N. & NE. Tropical Africa, Arabian Peninsula, Europe to Siberia and Iran
	Pteridium arachnoideum (Kaulf.) Maxon	Mexico to Tropical America
	Pteridium brownseyi Fraser-Jenk.	Pakistan to W. Himalaya
	Pteridium campestre (Schrad.) Christenh.	S. Tropical America.
	Pteridium capense (Thunb.) Krasser	Africa.
	Pteridium caudatum (L.) Maxon	Tropical & Subtropical America.
	Pteridium centrali-africanum (Hieron.) Alston	Gabon to Kenya and S. Tropical Africa
	Pteridium decompositum (Gaudich.) Christenh.	Hawaii
	Pteridium esculentum (G.Forst.) Cockayne	SE. China to Sumatera and S. Pacific
	Pteridium falcatum Ching ex S.H.Wu	China (E. Guangxi)
	Pteridium feei (W.Schaffn. ex Fée) Maxon ex Faull	Mexico to Central America
	Pteridium japonicum (Nakai) Tardieu & C.Chr.	China to Indo-China and Temp. E. Asia
	Pteridium latiusculum (Desv.) Hieron.	Canada to N. Mexico
	Pteridium lineare Ching ex S.H.Wu	China (W. Yunnan)
	Pteridium pinetorum C.N.Page & R.R.Mill	Europe to Siberia.
	Pteridium pseudocaudatum (Clute) Christenh.	Central & E. U.S.A.
	Pteridium pubescens (Underw.) Christenh.	Alaska to Mexico (Baja California)
	Pteridium revolutum (Blume) Nakai	Tropical & Subtropical Asia to N. Australia
	Pteridium rostratum (Burm.f.) Fraser-Jenk.	E. Himalaya to W. Malesia, Maluku, NE. Queensland
	Pteridium yunnanense Ching & S.H.Wu	China (W. Yunnan)

== Distribution and habitat ==
Pteridium aquilinum (bracken or common bracken) is the most common species of this genus with a cosmopolitan distribution (occurring in suitable habitats in temperate and subtropical regions throughout much of the world).

It is a prolific and abundant plant in the moorlands of Ireland, where it is limited to altitudes of below 600 metres (2,000 ft). It does not like poorly drained marshes or fen. It has been observed growing in soils from pH 2.8 to 8.6. Exposure to cold or high pH inhibits its growth.

As of the mid-1990s, the problem of the expansive growth of the range of bracken was an acute issue in Great Britain; as Malcolm Smith noted in reporting for The Independent in September 1996,

The area covered by [bracken, as of that date] in Britain is equivalent to the size of Yorkshire, 2.5 [million] acres... [and] it is still spreading, in places by up to three per cent a year

citing a Bracken Advisory Commission member and professor of sustainable land use. That expert, Roy Brown, noted bracken to be "particularly bad in eastern Scotland, Cumbria, in the North York Moors, parts of Wales and southwest England", and "spreading on many lowland roadside verges, sometimes into pastures", noting that "In the uplands, if heather moorland is burnt too often, or grazed too heavily, bracken takes over... spread[ing] very quickly, especially on deeper soils, by its underground rhizomes", noting that once it becomes established, its eradication is difficult. Brown stated his view, at that time, that "removing the grants that used to be paid to farmers to eradicate bracken has done us no favours". (At one time the British government had an eradication programme, paying farmers to do so—but as of September 1996, such support had ceased, except in Wales.)

Bracken is a characteristic moorland plant in Ireland, which over the last decades has increasingly out-competed characteristic ground-cover plants such as moor grasses, cowberry, bilberry, and heathers. It now covers a considerable part of upland moorland. It causes problems when it invades pastureland.

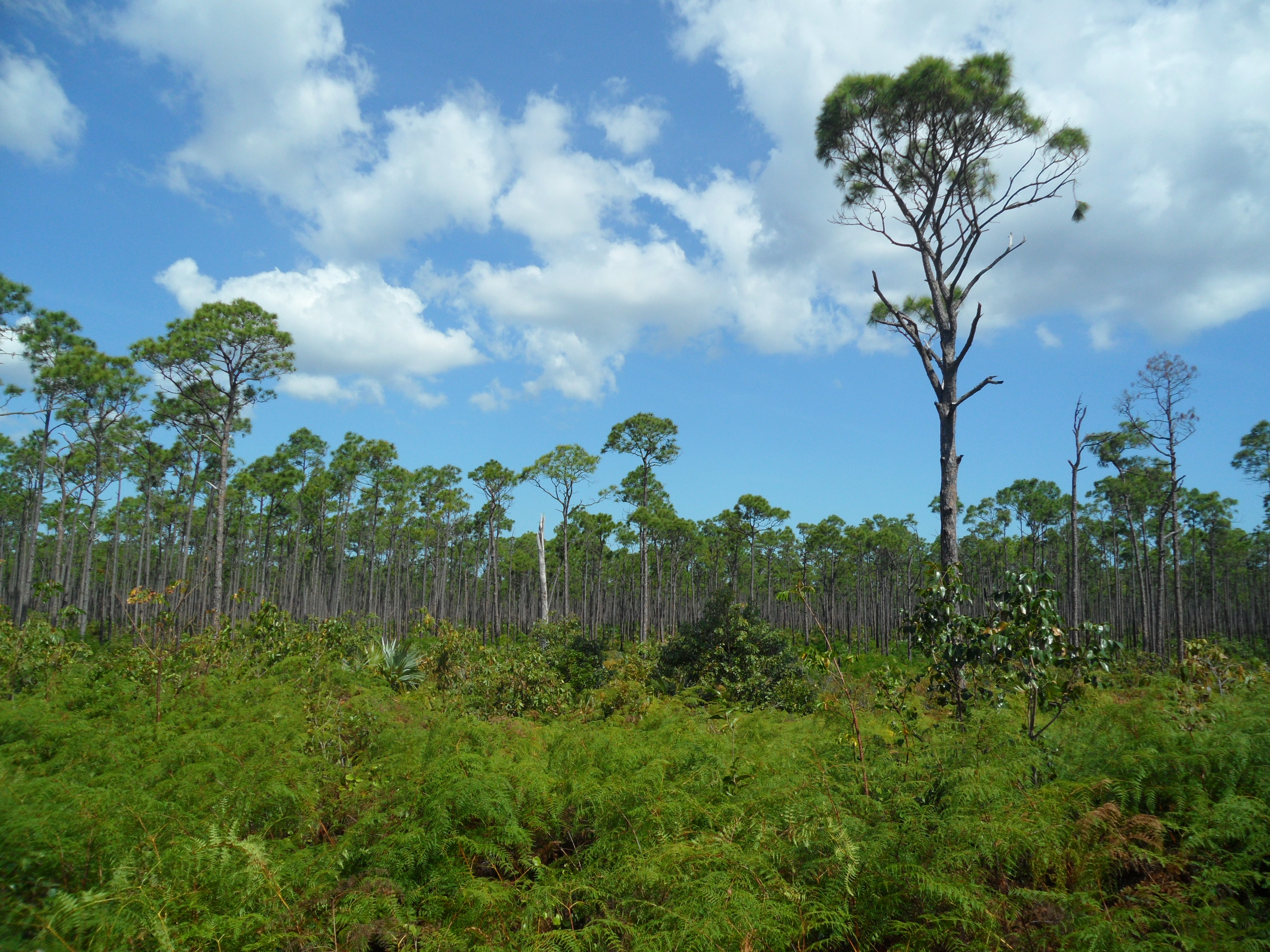
Bahamian Pineyards with Southern Bracken Fern at The Lucayan National Park of the Bahamas

Once valued and gathered for use in animal bedding, tanning, soap and glass making, and as a fertiliser, bracken is now seen as a pernicious, invasive, and opportunistic plant, taking over from the plants traditionally associated with open moorland and reducing easy access by humans. It is toxic to cattle, dogs, sheep, pigs, and horses, and is also linked to cancers in humans. In the United Kingdom, concern over the ptaquiloside-class of oncogenic natural products has led to application of special filters in processing British water supplies, to filter out bracken spores.

Bracken can harbour high levels of sheep ticks, which can pass on Lyme disease. Grazing provided some control by stock trampling, but this has almost ceased since the 2001 foot-and-mouth disease outbreak reduced commercial livestock production.

Bracken is a well-adapted pioneer plant which can colonise land quickly, with the potential to extend its area by as much as 1%–3% per year. This ability to expand rapidly at the expense of other plants and wildlife can cause major problems for land users and managers. It colonises ground with an open vegetation structure, but is slow to colonise healthy, well managed heather stands.

Bracken presents a threat to biodiversity. Many plant species occur only on upland moorland, tied to unique features in the habitat. The loss and degradation of such areas due to the dominance of bracken has caused many species to become rare and isolated.

Bracken is known to form large fern prairies, sometimes known as fern savannahs or the Fernland. Some of these are natural, but others can be formed via fires created by humans.Brackens are also key parts of other types of savannah, such as Pine savannah and Pineyards.

== Ecology ==
Bracken spreads quickly through underground rhizomes and may be considered an invasive weed in certain places. This, its wide soil quality tolerance and lightweight spores, lends it to be a pioneer species; typically establishing itself in recently disturbed areas. After fires, the ferns can quickly colonize the space and absorb large amounts of nutrients from the wood ash. Deer utilize the young ferns as an early spring food source. Elk are also known to graze on the young fronds.

=== Fungal associations ===
Woodland fungi such as Mycena epipterygia can be found growing under the bracken canopy. Both Camarographium stephensii and Typhula quisquiliaris grow primarily from dead bracken stems.

=== Other plant associations ===
Young bracken fronds curled

Bracken is known to produce and release allelopathic chemicals, which is an important factor in its ability to dominate other vegetation, particularly in regrowth after fire. Its chemical emissions, shady canopy, and thick litter inhibit other plant species from establishing themselves – with the occasional exception of plants which support rare butterflies. Herb and tree seedling growth may be inhibited even after bracken is removed, apparently because active plant toxins remain in the soil.

Bracken substitutes the characteristics of a woodland canopy, and is important for giving shade to European plants such as common bluebell and wood anemone where the woodland does not exist. These plants are intolerant to stock trampling. Dead bracken provides a warm microclimate for development of the immature stages. Climbing corydalis, wild gladiolus, and chickweed wintergreen also seem to benefit from the conditions found under bracken stands.

The high humidity in the stands helps mosses survive underneath, including Campylopus flexuosus, Hypnum cupressiforme, Polytrichum commune, Pseudoscelopodium purum and Rhytidiadelphus squarrosus.

== Control ==
Some small level of scattered cover can provide beneficial habitats for some wildlife, at least in the UK (as given above). However, on balance, removing bracken encourages primary habitats to re-establish, which are of greater importance for wildlife. Control is a complex question with complex answers, which need to form part of a wider approach. Management can be difficult and expensive; plans may need to be about cost-effective, practical limitation and control rather than give an expectation for eradication.

All methods need follow-up over time, starting with the advancing areas first. Given the decades elapsed to arrive at the current levels of coverage on many sites, slowing or reversing the process will also be of necessity long-term, with consistency and persistence from all parties being key.

Various techniques are recommended by Natural England and the RSPB to control bracken either individually or in combination RSPB Bracken management in the uplands.

- Cutting – Once or twice a year, repeatedly cutting back the fronds for at least 3 years.
- Crushing/rolling – Using rollers, again for at least 3 years.
- Livestock treading – During winter, encouraging livestock to bracken areas with food. They trample the developing plants and allow frost to penetrate the rhizomes. In May and June, temporary close grazing or mob stocking on small areas away from nests, particularly using cattle, horses, pigs, or ponies may crush emerging bracken fronds resulting in reduced bracken cover. Sufficient fodder will be required to prevent livestock eating the bracken. This may suit steep areas where human access is difficult and herbicide undesirable.
- Herbicide – Asulam (also known as Asulox) is selective for ferns; glyphosate is not; but the latter has the advantage that the effects can be seen soon after application. They are applied when the fronds are fully unfurled to ensure that the chemical is fully absorbed. Rare ferns such as adder's tongue (Ophioglossum vulgatum), killarney (Trichomanes speciosum) and lemon-scented ferns can also be found in similar habitats and it is important that these are not destroyed in the process of bracken control.

Natural England recommends that only Asulam can be sprayed aerially, Glyphosate requires spot treatment, e.g. using a weedwiper or knapsack spray. The toxicity of Asulam is low and has been generally highly cost-effective but its use is now restricted by the EU after 2012, at least until specific registered uses can be defined.

Selective sprays like Starane, Access, Metsulfuron 600WG, etc. work well but only if sprayed in late autumn so the rhizomes store food for winter and hence absorb the poison.

On archaeological sites, chemical control is usually required as mechanical methods may cause damage.

- Allowing plants to grow in its place, e.g., the establishment of woodland, causes shade that inhibits bracken growth. In the UK, trees, notably rowan, have done well since grazing reduced greatly after the foot-and-mouth epidemic in 2000 but young saplings struggle in high bracken. In decades to come and if permitted, tree shade cover may increase and so may reduce bracken growth, but this is both long-term and in some cases is contentious in the change it would bring to traditionally open heath or moorland, both aesthetically and as a valuable habitat.
- Burning – Useful for removing the litter, but may be counter-productive as bracken is considered to be a fire-adapted species.
- Ploughing – Late in the season followed by sowing seed.

Any bracken control programme must be completed, or bracken will re-establish.

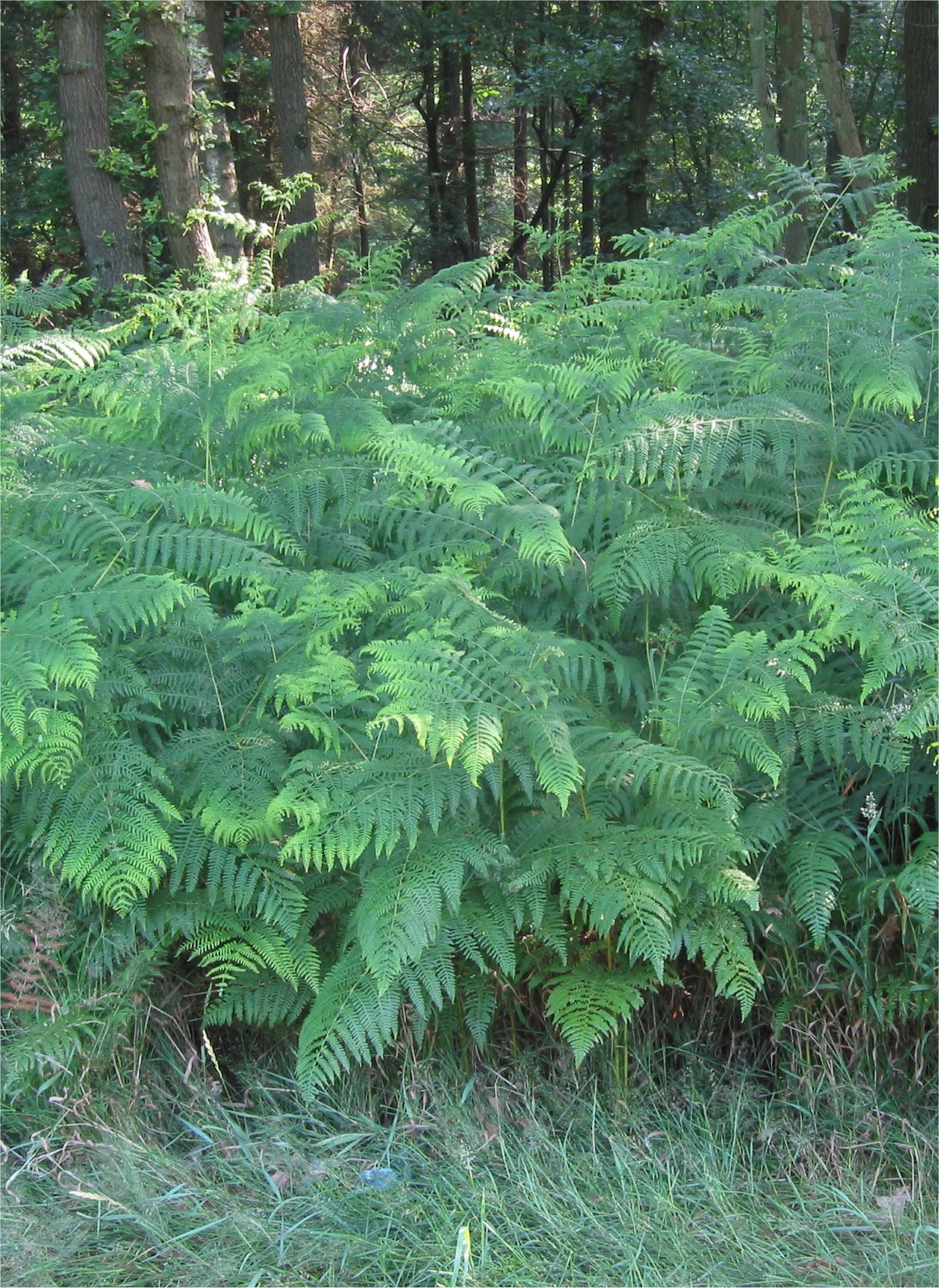
Pteridium aquilinum

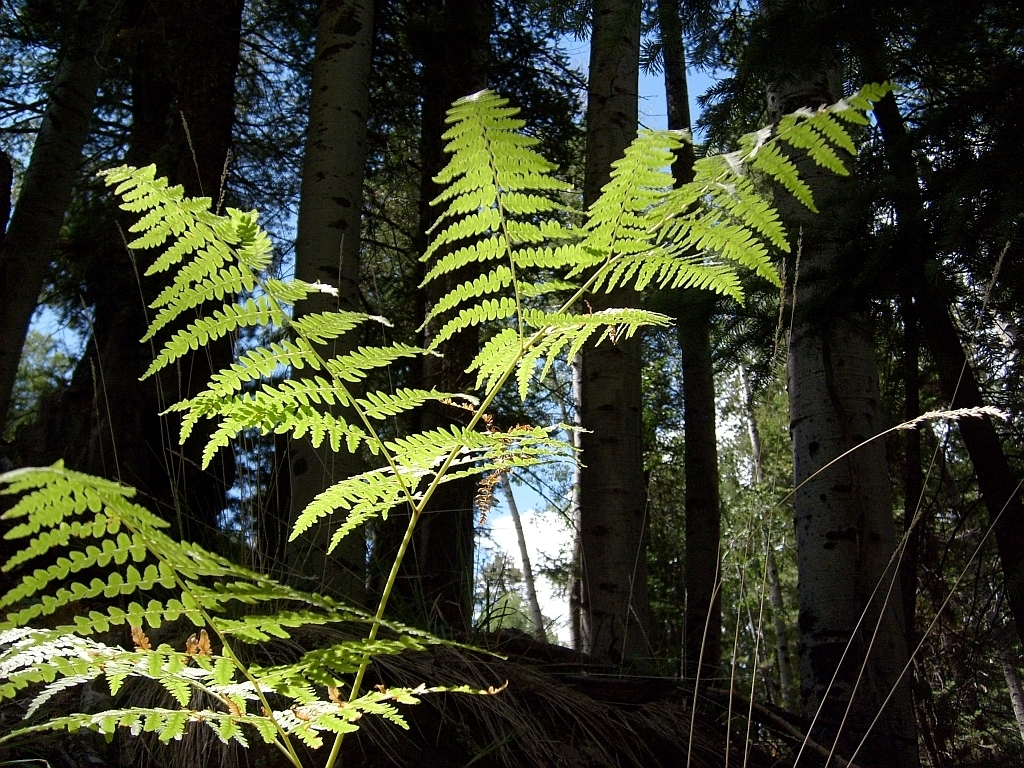
Fronds of bracken

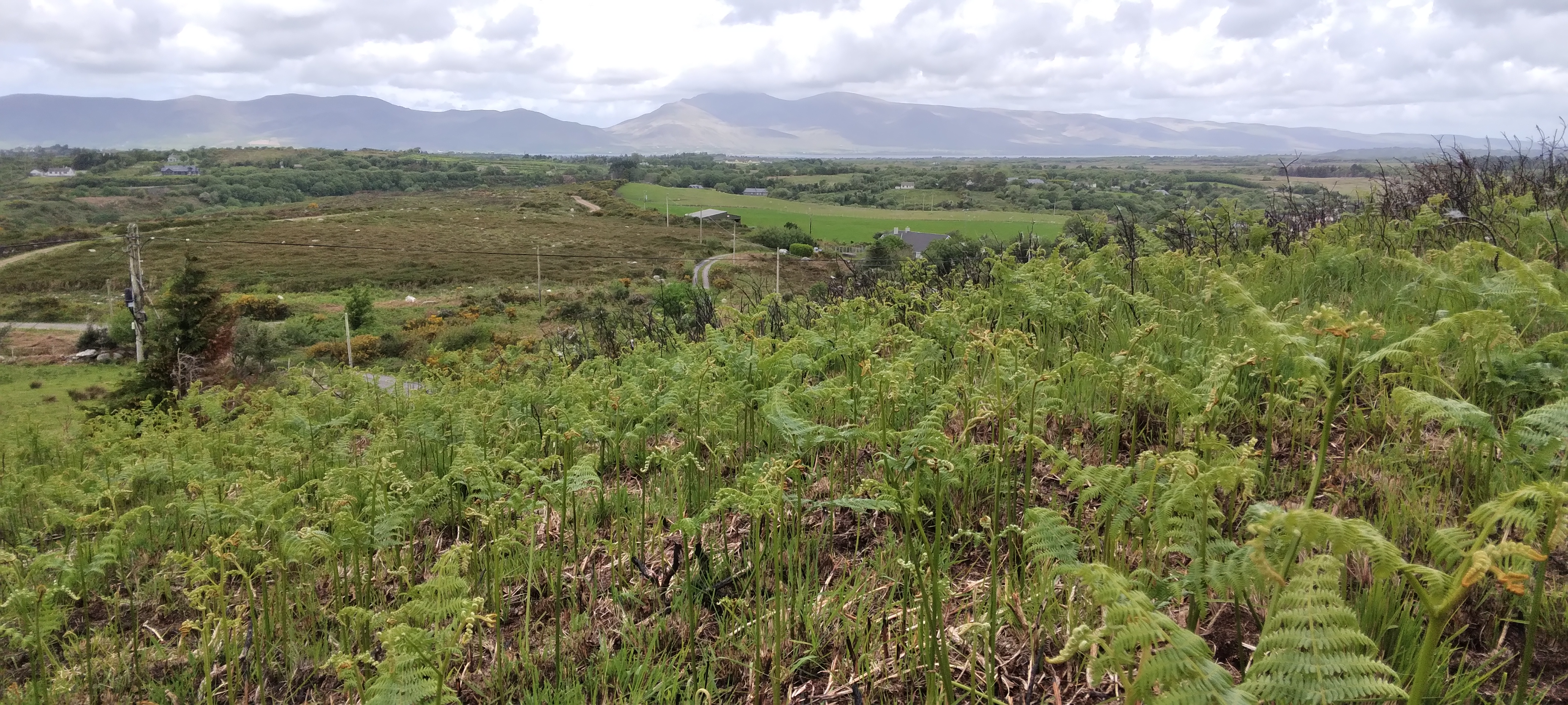
Bracken fronds emerging from uncultivated land that was recently burned of heather

== Uses ==
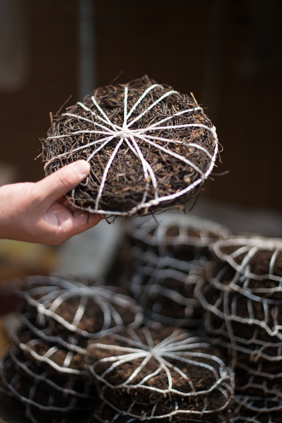
Dried bracken bundles (P. aquilinum) at a food market in South Korea

=== Food ===
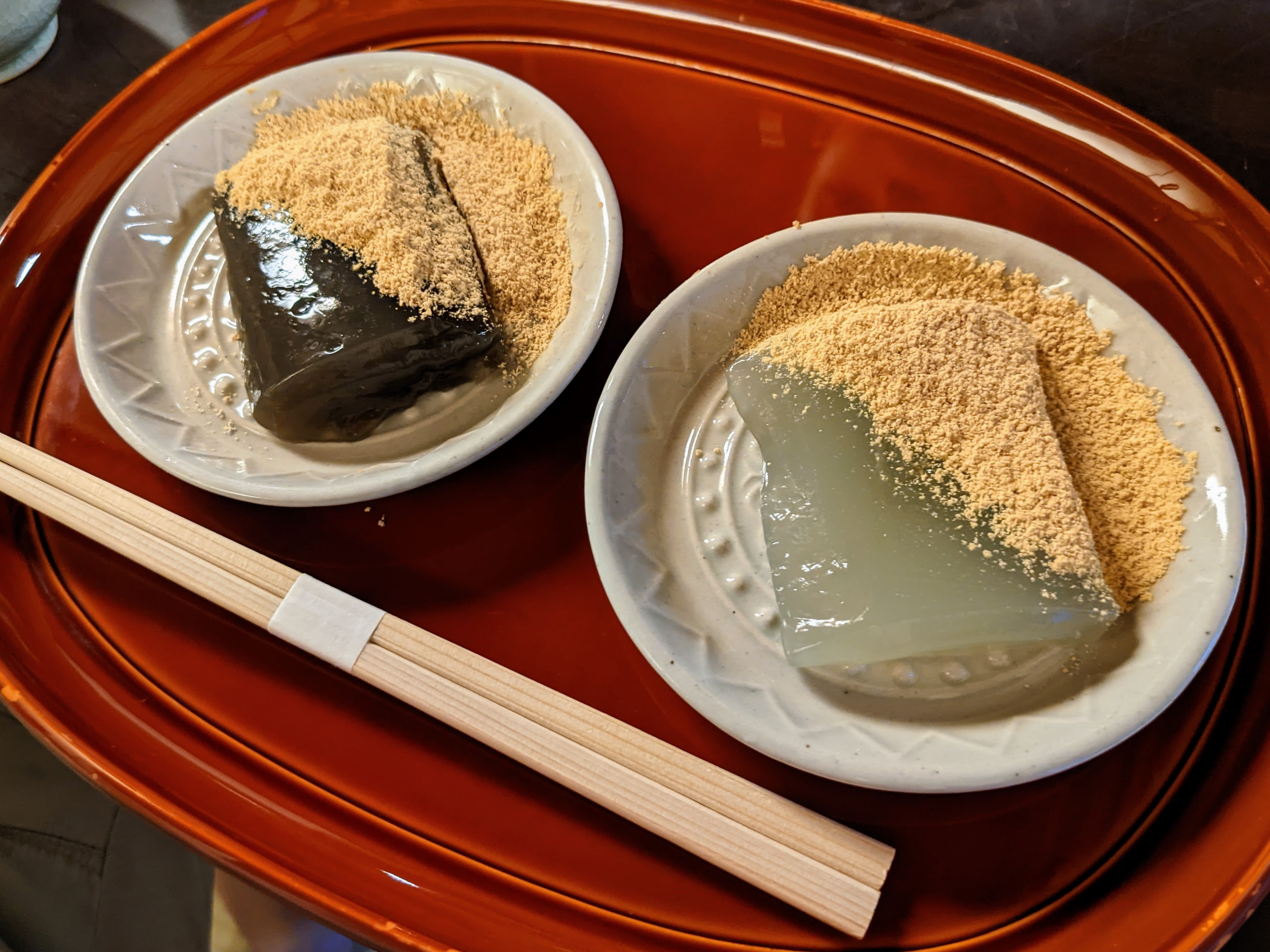
Warabimochi bracken jelly, a traditional Japanese dessert. The darker jelly on the left is made from pure bracken powder, while the lighter jelly on the right uses other starches as well.

Bracken fiddleheads have been eaten by many cultures throughout history, either fresh, cooked, or pickled. Pteridium aquilinum is especially common in East Asian cuisine.

In Korea, bracken (sometimes referred to as 'fernbrake' in Korean recipes) is known as gosari (Korean: 고사리), and is a typical ingredient in bibimbap, a popular mixed rice dish. Stir-fried bracken (gosari namul) is also a common side dish (banchan) in Korea.

In Japan, bracken is known as warabi (ワラビ)(ja), and is steamed, boiled, or cooked in soups. Warabimochi bracken jelly, named after its resemblance to mochi rice cakes, is a popular traditional dessert, although commercial variants are often made with cheaper potato starch instead. The fiddleheads are also preserved in salt, sake, or miso.

In China, bracken is known as juecai (Chinese: 蕨菜) and is eaten like vegetables or preserved by drying. Also called "fernbrake", it is used as a vegetable in soups and stews.

Bracken rhizomes can be ground into flour to make bread. In the Canary Islands, the rhizome was historically used to make a porridge called gofio. Both fronds and rhizomes have been used to produce beer in Siberia, and among indigenous peoples of North America.

Bracken leaves are used in the Mediterranean region to filter sheep's milk, and to store freshly made ricotta cheese.

P. esculentum rhizomes were traditionally used by the Māori people of New Zealand as a staple food, and are known as aruhe. They were eaten by exploring or hunting groups away from permanent settlements. The plant was widely distributed across New Zealand as a result of prehistoric deforestation, and planting on rich soils, which produced the best rhizomes. The rhizomes were dried, and could be heated and softened with a pounder (patu aruhe), after which the starch could be sucked from the fibres. Patu aruhe were important ritual items, and several distinct styles were developed.

=== Source of potash ===
Green bracken ferns average 25% potash and can contain as much as 55%. It has advantages over other sources of plant ash, such as hardwood, due to its high potash yield as a percentage of both dry and fresh mass, abundance, growth rate, and ease of harvesting. Bracken has been recognized as a source of potash since at least the 10th century AD, with numerous references in European texts, typically in relation to its use for soap and glass making. The turn to mined sources of potash in the industrial age ended significant use of bracken as a source of potash, contributing to its status as a troublesome weed.

=== Others ===
Bracken has traditionally been used for animal bedding, which later breaks down into a rich mulch that could be used as fertilizer. It is still used this way in Wales. It is also used as a winter mulch, which has been shown to reduce the loss of potassium and nitrogen in the soil, and to lower soil pH.

== Toxicity ==
=== In animals ===
The ptaquiloside family of natural products from bracken have been shown to be carcinogenic in some animals. Foraging animals may ingest the plant when other sources of food are unavailable, such as during droughts or after snowfalls. In cattle, bracken poisoning can occur in acute and chronic forms, acute poisoning being the most common; milk from cows that have eaten bracken may also contain ptaquiloside, which is especially concentrated in buttermilk.

With regard to human impact, the carcinogenic ptaquilosides in bracken have been shown to cause damage to DNA, and their consumption correlates with cancer incidence, in particular, gastrointestinal cancers. Ptaquilosides have been shown to leach from wild bracken plants into the water supply, which has been implicated in high rates of stomach and oesophageal cancers in areas with high bracken growth, such as Wales and South America. Consumption of ptaquiloside-contaminated milk is thought to contribute to human gastric cancer in the Andean states of Venezuela. (High stomach cancer rates are found in Japan and North Wales, where bracken is often eaten, but it is unclear whether bracken plays a role.)

The ptaquilosides are water-soluble and destroyed in heat (by cooking) and alkaline conditions (by soaking). Korean and Japanese cooks have traditionally soaked the shoots in water and ash to detoxify the plant before eating. Ptaquiloside also decomposes at room temperature, and almost completely at boiling temperature.

The British Royal Horticultural Society recommends against consumption of bracken altogether, by both humans and livestock. Moderation of consumption is recommended by some popular, non-expert publications (to reduce chances of cancer formation).

==== Thiamine breakdown ====
Uncooked bracken also contains the enzyme thiaminase, which breaks down thiamine (vitamin B1). Excessive consumption of bracken can lead to vitamin B1 deficiency (beriberi), especially in animals with simple stomachs. Ruminants are less vulnerable because they synthesize thiamine. In pigs and horses, bracken poisoning induces vitamin B1 deficiency.

=== In insects ===
Hydrogen cyanide is released by the young fronds of bracken when eaten by mammals or insects. Two major insect moulting hormones, alpha ecdysone and 20-hydroxyecdysone, are found in bracken. These cause uncontrollable, repeated moulting in insects ingesting the fronds, leading to rapid death. As of 2008, bracken was under investigation as a possible source of new insecticides.

== Archaeology ==
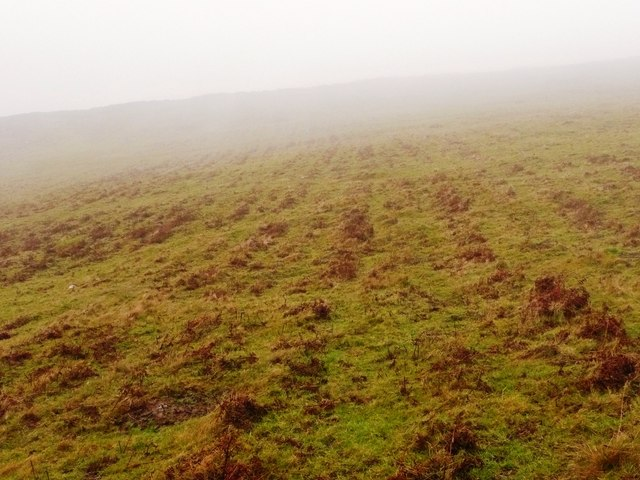
Bracken in Ireland with a linear pattern running across the hillside, a possible indication of past cultivation

Many sites have archaeological remains dating from the Neolithic and Bronze Ages through to the Industrial Revolution. The root systems of established bracken stands degrade archaeological sites by disrupting the strata and other physical evidence. These rhizomes may travel a metre or more underground between fronds and form 90% of the plant, with only the remainder being visible.

== In culture ==
Bracken is commonly referred to by local populations in the north of England as 'Moorland Scrub'.

The creature 'Bracken' from the 2023 video game Lethal Company is named after the plant.

== See also ==
- List of plants poisonous to equines
