= Pikopiko =

Pikopiko is a Māori word for the young curled shoots of ferns. The pikopiko was one of the foods that was eaten at Matariki feasts. Once harvested, pikopiko can be peeled and washed to remove the bitterness, then steamed, boiled, stir-fried, chopped and added to bread dough, blended with oil and nuts to make a spread or simply used as an attractive and delicious garnish. It may refer to a range of fern species including:

- Asplenium bulbiferum, hen and chicken fern.
- Polystichum richardii, common shield fern.
