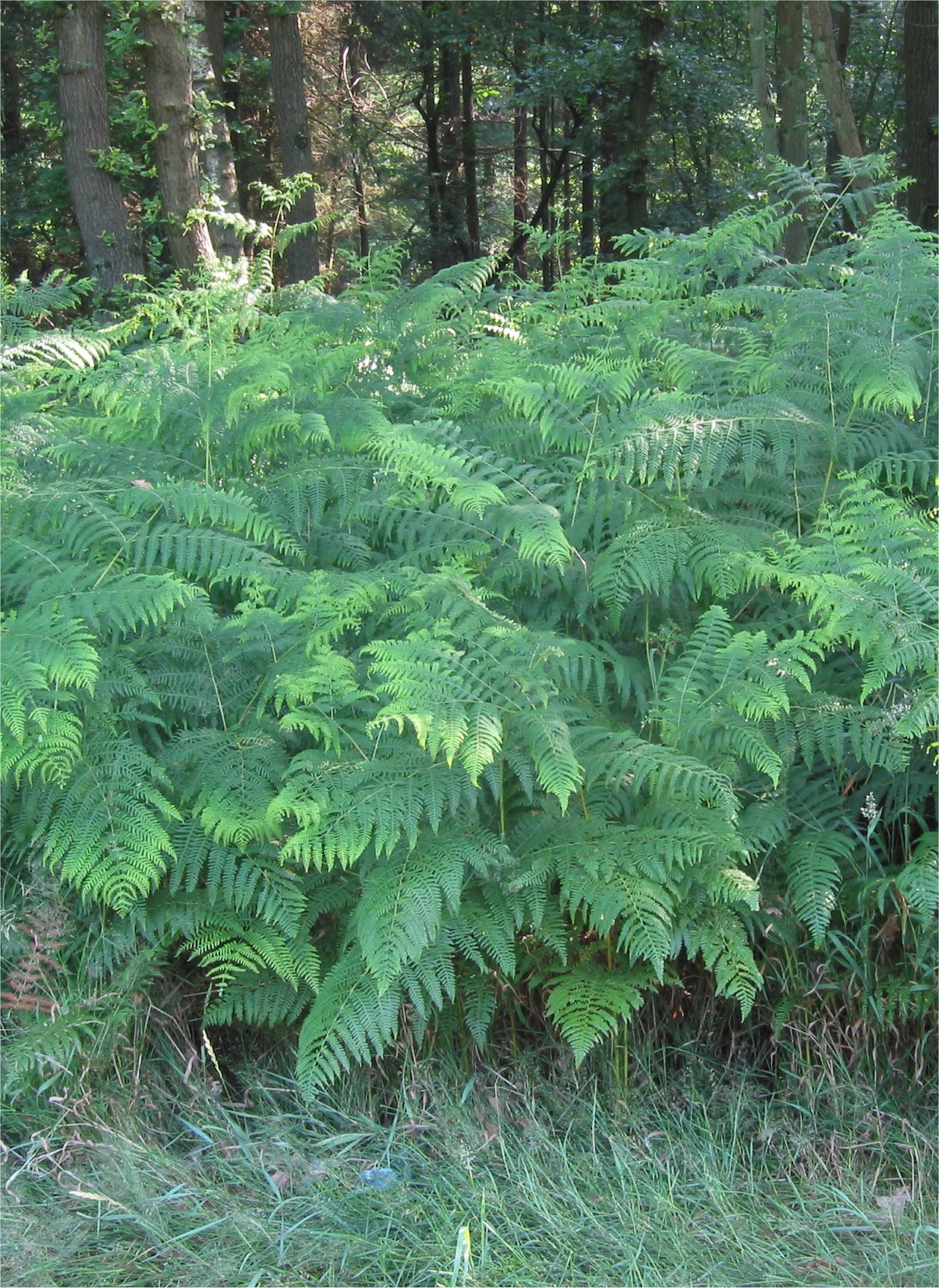

Conservation status
- Least Concern (IUCN 3.1)

- Secure (NatureServe)

Scientific classification
- Kingdom: Plantae
- Clade: Tracheophytes
- Division: Polypodiophyta
- Class: Polypodiopsida
- Order: Polypodiales
- Family: Dennstaedtiaceae
- Genus: Pteridium
- Species: P. aquilinum

Binomial name
- Pteridium aquilinum (L.) Kuhn

= Pteridium aquilinum =

Species of plant (fern)

Pteridium aquilinum, commonly called bracken, brake, pasture brake, common bracken, and also known as eagle fern, is a species of fern occurring in temperate and subtropical regions in both hemispheres. Originally native to Eurasia and North America, the extreme lightness of its spores has led to it achieving a cosmopolitan distribution. It is a herbaceous perennial plant with large, triangular fronds that grow from an underground rhizome.

== Description ==
Common bracken is a herbaceous perennial plant, deciduous in winter. The large, roughly triangular fronds are produced singly, arising upwards from an underground rhizome, and grow to 0.3–1 metre (1–3 1/2 feet) tall; the main stem, or stipe, is up to 1 centimetre (1/2 inch) in diameter at the base. It dies back to ground level in autumn. The rhizome grows up to 3.5 metres (11 1/2 ft) deep, about 5 cm (2 in) in diameter, and up to 15 m (50 ft) long. Because it regrows in the spring from an underground rhizome, P. aquilinum tends to be found in dense colonies of genetically identical fronds. Such colonies can be as much as 650 years of age, with individual rhizomes living up to 72 years. One colony at Raakkyla, North Karelia, Finland, studied by Eino Oinonen proved to be 489 m (1,604 ft) in diameter and based on growth rate, over 1400 years of age. In the spring as the plant enters its growing cycle, fiddleheads are first sent up from the rhizome. The density and area covered by a single rhizome maximizes that rhizome's chance of biological success when sending up new growth. The new growth presents as vertical stalks, coiled and covered in silver-grey hairs, that can be a metre or more in height before unfurling into fronds.

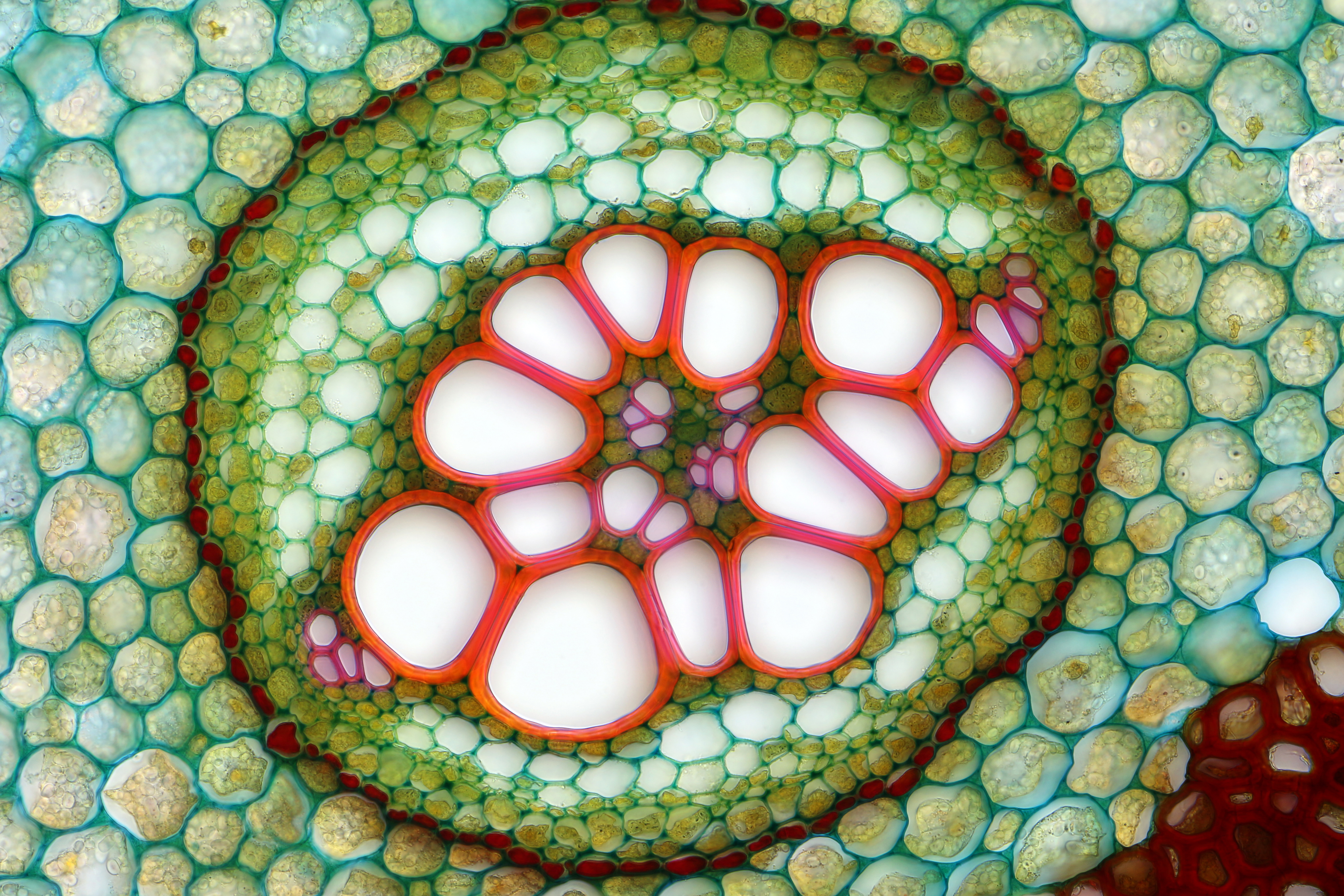
Amphicribral vascular bundle of a common bracken rhizome

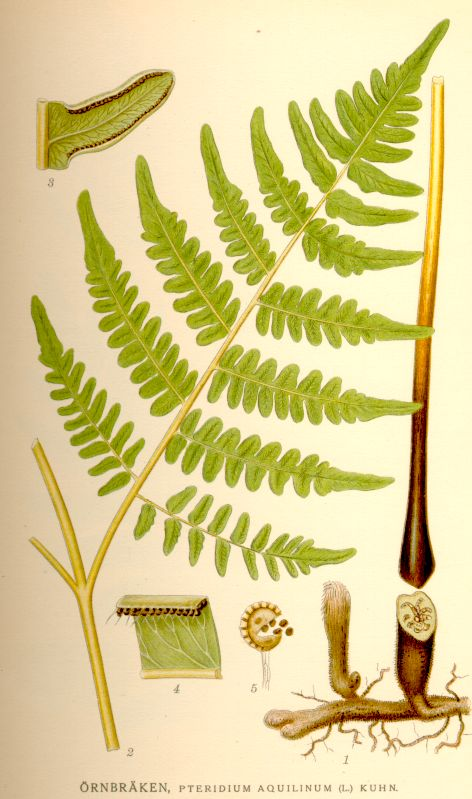
Diagram of the plant's leaves

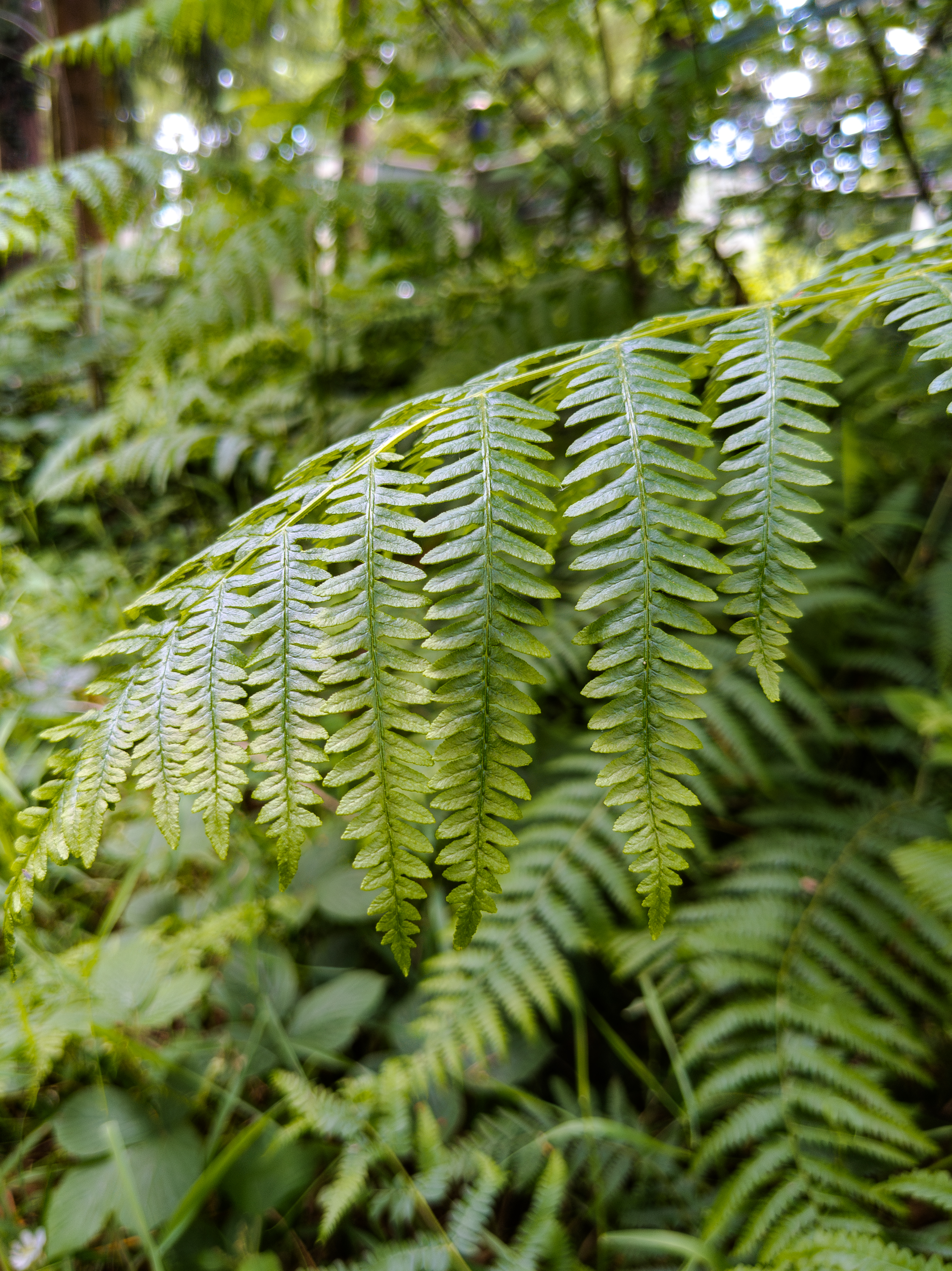
Leaves of a P. aquilinum plant

=== Reproduction ===
Sporangia are formed in sori on the underside of the frond. They are arranged in narrow brown bands, and form spores over July, August and September.

== Taxonomy ==
It was traditionally treated as the sole species in the genus Pteridium (brackens); however, authorities have split and recognised up to 11 species in the genus. It was placed in the genus Pteridium by Friedrich Adalbert Maximilian Kuhn in 1879. Genetic analysis of Pteridium from 100 different locations worldwide has revealed two distinct species and despite the common name "bracken" being shared, the "southern" species is Pteridium esculentum. Though the southern P. esculentum shows little genetic diversity among physically isolated locations, P. aquilinum has distinct groups at the continental scale. However, evidence of long-distance gene flow was found in samples taken from Hawaii that presented elements of both North American and Asian subspecies of P. aquilinum.

=== Etymology ===
Common bracken was first described as Pteris aquilina by Carl Linnaeus, in Volume 2 of his Species Plantarum in 1753. The origin of the specific epithet derived from the Latin aquila "eagle". In the reprint of the Flora Suecica in 1755, Linnaeus explains that the name refers to the image of an eagle seen in the transverse section of the root. In spite of this, the opinion has been forwarded that the name pertains to the shape of the mature fronds appearing akin to an eagle's wing. However, medieval scholars, including Erasmus, thought the pattern of the fibres seen in a transverse section of the stipe resembled a double-headed eagle or oak tree.

== Distribution and habitat ==
Bracken is native to Europe, Eastern Asia and North America, but now has an almost cosmopolitan distribution. In the Americas, it is found throughout the continental United States and the Canadian provinces of Ontario, Quebec, and Newfoundland. Its range's northern border extends to southern Alaska, while its southern reaches the northern portions of Mexico, as well as the Greater Antilles in the Caribbean. Weedy in acidic upland pastures of northwestern Europe.

Bracken grows in pastures, deciduous and coniferous woodlands, and hillsides. It prefers acidic soils.

An adaptable plant, bracken readily colonises disturbed areas. It can even be aggressive in countries where it is native, such as England, where it has invaded heather (Calluna vulgaris (L.) Hull) stands on the North Yorkshire moors. In Ireland, bracken is found in open woodland and sandy pastures.

== Toxicity ==
The plant contains the carcinogenic compound ptaquiloside. Ptaquiloside is known to cause haemorrhagic diseases in ruminants, tumours and haematological problems in non-ruminants, and is correlated with oesophageal and gastric cancer in humans. Chronic bracken consumption is also associated with upper digestive tract (UDT) squamous cell carcinomas in cattle (ruminants)—with the most aggressive and serious tumors located in the caudal (lower) UDT.

High stomach cancer rates are found in Japan and North Wales, where the young stems are used as a vegetable, but it is unknown whether bracken plays any part or if the cancer can be attributed to another cause. Consumption of ptaquiloside-contaminated milk is thought to contribute to human gastric cancer in the Andean states of Venezuela. The spores have also been implicated as carcinogens. Consumption of contaminated water and meat may be dangerous as well.

However, ptaquiloside is water-soluble, and is reduced by soaking bracken in cool water. Korean and Japanese cooks have traditionally soaked the shoots in water and ash to detoxify the plant before eating. Ptaquiloside also degenerates at room temperature, which explains why the rat studies were done with the toxin stored at −20 °C (−4 °F). At boiling temperature, the carcinogen denatures almost completely. Salt and baking soda also help with volatilizing the chemical.

It has been suggested that selenium supplementation can prevent as well as reverse the immunotoxic effects induced by ptaquiloside from Pteridium aquilinum.

== Uses ==
=== Food ===
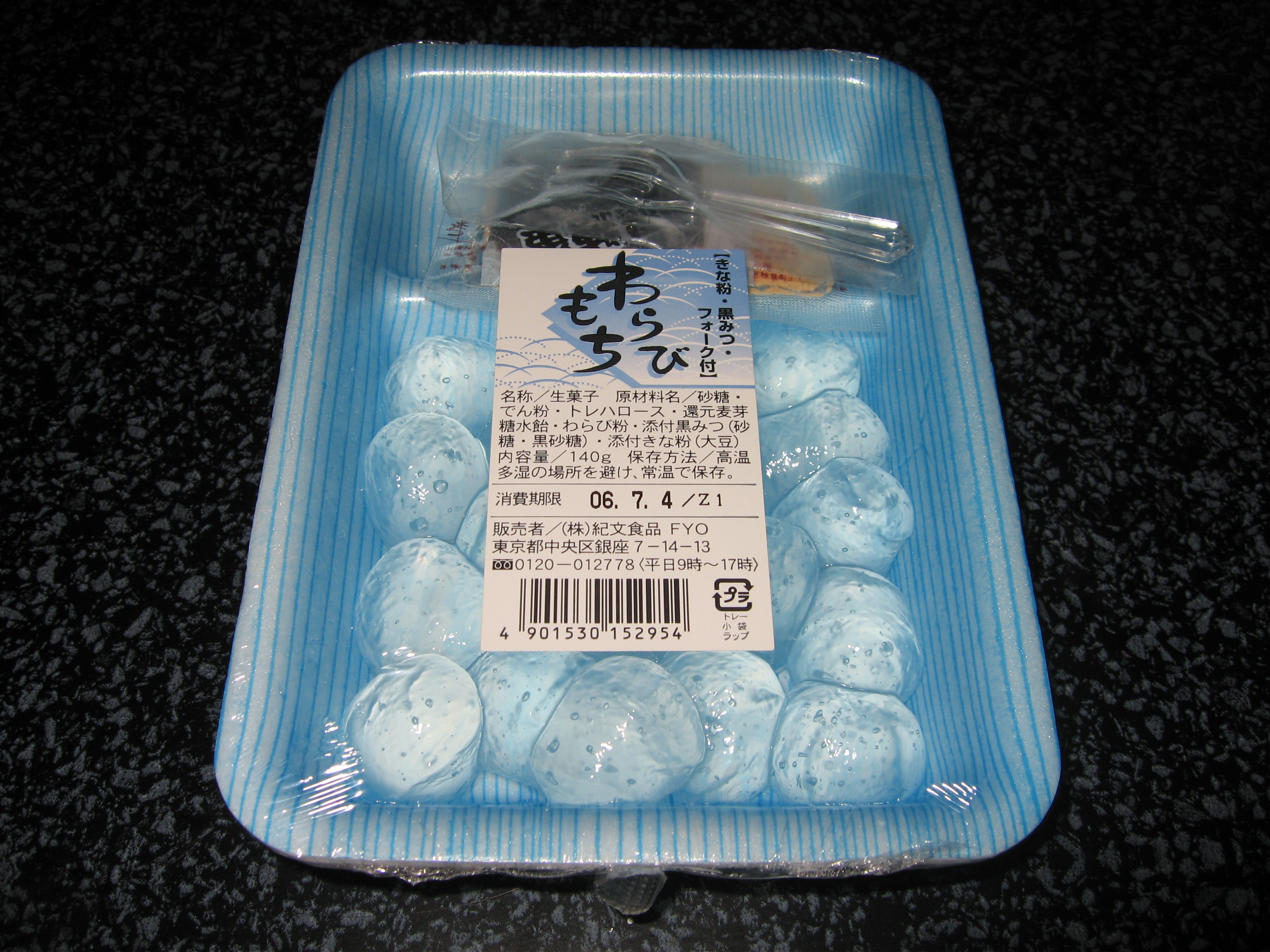
Commercially packaged warabimochi (bracken jelly) in Japan

Despite its established toxicity, P. aquilinum's global distribution—it is the fifth most widely distributed common weed species in the world—means that it has a long history of being consumed in many parts of the world. The toxicity and wide distribution has led to variation in cultural attitudes towards the consumption of the plant. In the United Kingdom where P. aquilinum is extremely successful, the rhizome was once consumed during and after World War I. However the Royal Horticultural Society now explicitly advises against its consumption due to toxicity.

Bracken is a widely eaten vegetable in Korea, Japan, the Russian Far East, and parts of China, where it has historically been one of the most important wild vegetables consumed. Populations of these countries where bracken is traditionally consumed have been able to access bracken in new locations after immigrating due to P. aquilinum's global ubiquity.

In Korea, bracken is known as gosari. It is soaked, parboiled, and stir-fried, and often eaten as a side dish (namul). It is also a classic ingredient of bibimbap.

In Japan, bracken is known as warabi (蕨, ワラビ), and a jelly-like starch made from it is a key ingredient for the chilled dessert warabimochi. As a type of sansai (mountain vegetables), young bracken shoots are steamed, boiled, or cooked in soups. The shoots are also preserved in salt, sake, or miso.

Ohlone people of California, who called the plant witt or by the name adopted from Californios manita, ate the young fronds of the pubescens variety raw or cooked. They also used the plant medicinally and in crafts.

Bracken shoots have been used to produce beer in Siberia, and among indigenous peoples of North America.

The rhizome can be ground into flour to make bread. In the Canary Islands, the rhizome was historically used to make a porridge called gofio.

Bracken leaves are used in the Mediterranean region to filter sheep's milk, and to store freshly made ricotta cheese.

The word Nooksack means "always bracken fern place" in the Nooksack language, and the rhizome of the plant was eaten extensively by the Nooksack people and other tribes of the Pacific Northwest.

Young fronds of the bracken can be harvested easily and should be cooked for 30 to 60 minutes. Mature bracken is toxic due to thiaminase and can be destroyed by cooking. Should be avoided if not skilled enough to prepare it.

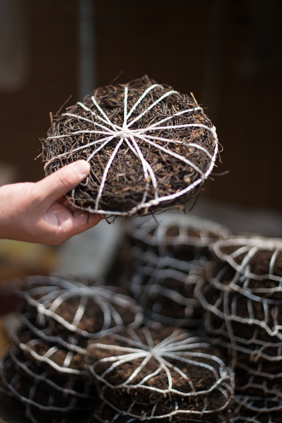
Dried bracken (gosari) from Korea

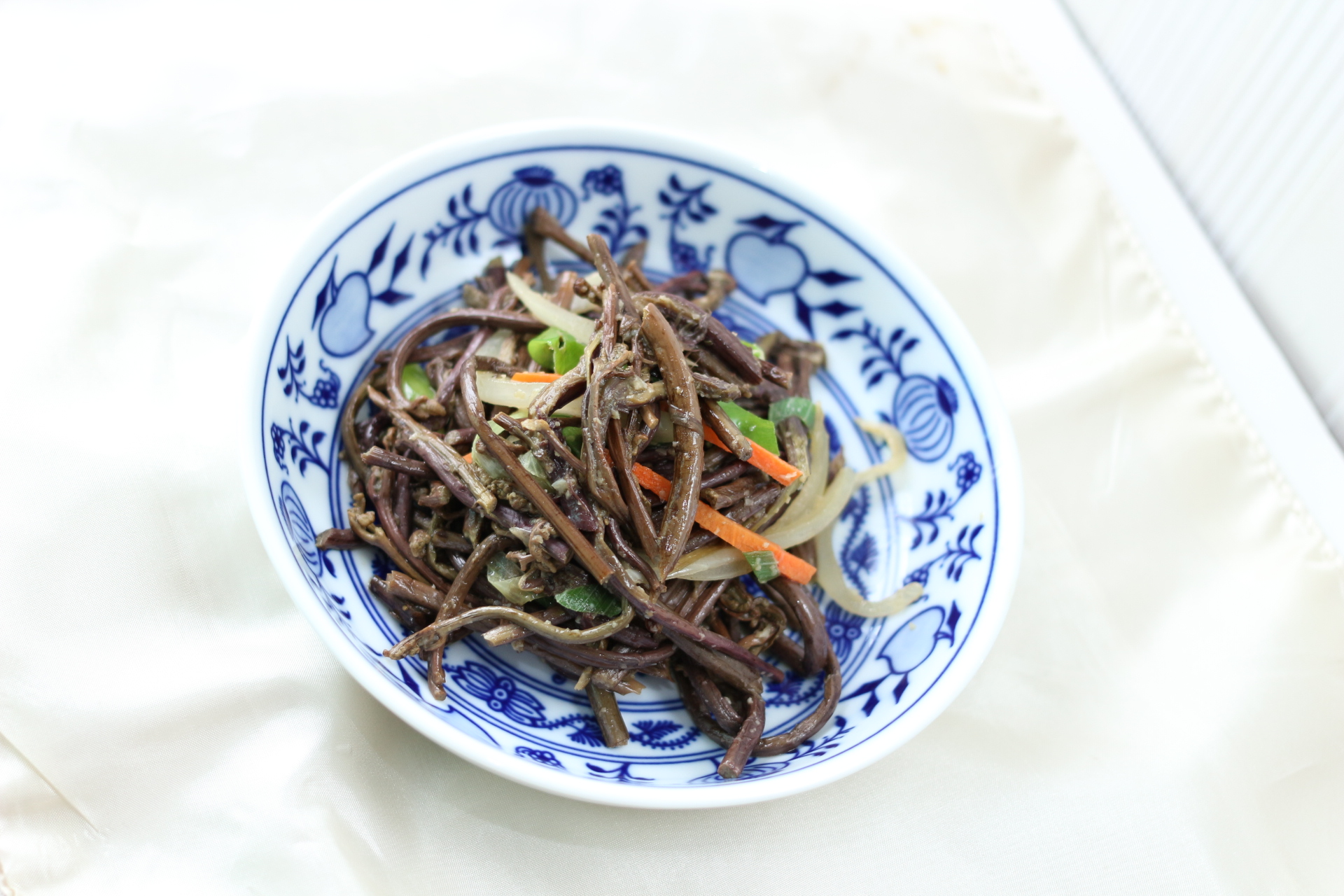
Seasoned stir-fried bracken (gosari namul) from Korea

=== Pharmacology ===
P. aquilinum has been investigated for its anti-inflammatory and antioxidative properties.

=== Traditional medicine ===
In Finnish traditional medicine, bracken has been used as a remedy in many ways:

- Elias Lönnrot advised to use a powder made of the plant's roots to drive away maggots.
- A decoction made of bracken was used to treat stomach problems, gout and joint pain.
- The leaves have been used as filling in mattresses, because it was believed to lessen rheumatic pain and drive away vermin.

In California, Ohlone people traditionally used the roots in a decoction as a hair rinse or in a paste which was rubbed in the scalp to encourage hair growth.

=== Crafts ===
Ohlone people used the fronds extensively as umbrellas, for roofing their homes, and to line acorn-leaching pits and earth ovens. They also used the roots in basketry.
