= Ptaquiloside =

Names
- IUPAC name (2R,3aR,7S,7aR)-7-Hydroxy-2,5,7-trimethyl-3a-[(2S,3R,4S,5S,6R)-3,4,5-trihydroxy-6-(hydroxymethyl)tetrahydropyran-2-yl]oxy-spiro[3,7a-dihydro-2H-indene-6,1'-cyclopropane]-1-one

Identifiers
CAS Number	87625-62-5
3D model (JSmol)	Interactive image
Beilstein Reference	3632862
ChEBI	CHEBI:82527
ChemSpider	10312775
KEGG	C19515
PubChem CID	13962857
UNII	F0MN9S5699
CompTox Dashboard (EPA)	DTXSID20892005
- InChI: InChI=1S/C20H30O8/c1-9-6-20(28-17-15(25)14(24)13(23)11(8-21)27-17)7-10(2)19(4-5-19)18(3,26)16(20)12(9)22/h7,9,11,13-17,21,23-26H,4-6,8H2,1-3H3/t9-,11-,13-,14+,15-,16-,17+,18+,20-/m1/s1
- SMILES: C[C@@H]1C[C@]2(C=C(C3(CC3)[C@@]([C@H]2C1=O)(C)O)C)O[C@H]4[C@@H]([C@H]([C@@H]([C@H](O4)CO)O)O)O

Properties
Chemical formula	C_{20}H_{30}O_{8}
Molar mass	398.452 g·mol^{−1}
Melting point	85 to 89 °C (185 to 192 °F; 358 to 362 K)
- Except where otherwise noted, data are given for materials in their standard state (at 25 °C [77 °F], 100 kPa). verify (what is ?) Infobox references

Ptaquiloside is a norsesquiterpene glucoside produced by bracken ferns (majorly Pteridium aquilinum) during metabolism. It is identified to be the main carcinogen of the ferns and to be responsible for their biological effects, such as haemorrhagic disease and bright blindness in livestock and oesophageal, gastric cancer in humans. Ptaquiloside has an unstable chemical structure and acts as a DNA alkylating agent under physiological conditions. It was first isolated and characterized by Yamada and co-workers in 1983.

The pure form ptaquiloside is a colorless amorphous compound. It is readily soluble in water and fairly soluble in ethyl acetate. Except in the plants, ptaquiloside has been detected in the milk and meat of affected livestock, as well as in the underground water and dry soil around bracken fern vegetation. The prevalence of ptaquiloside in daily sources along with its carcinogenic effects make it an increasing biological hazard in modern days.

== Sources ==
=== In plants and food chains ===
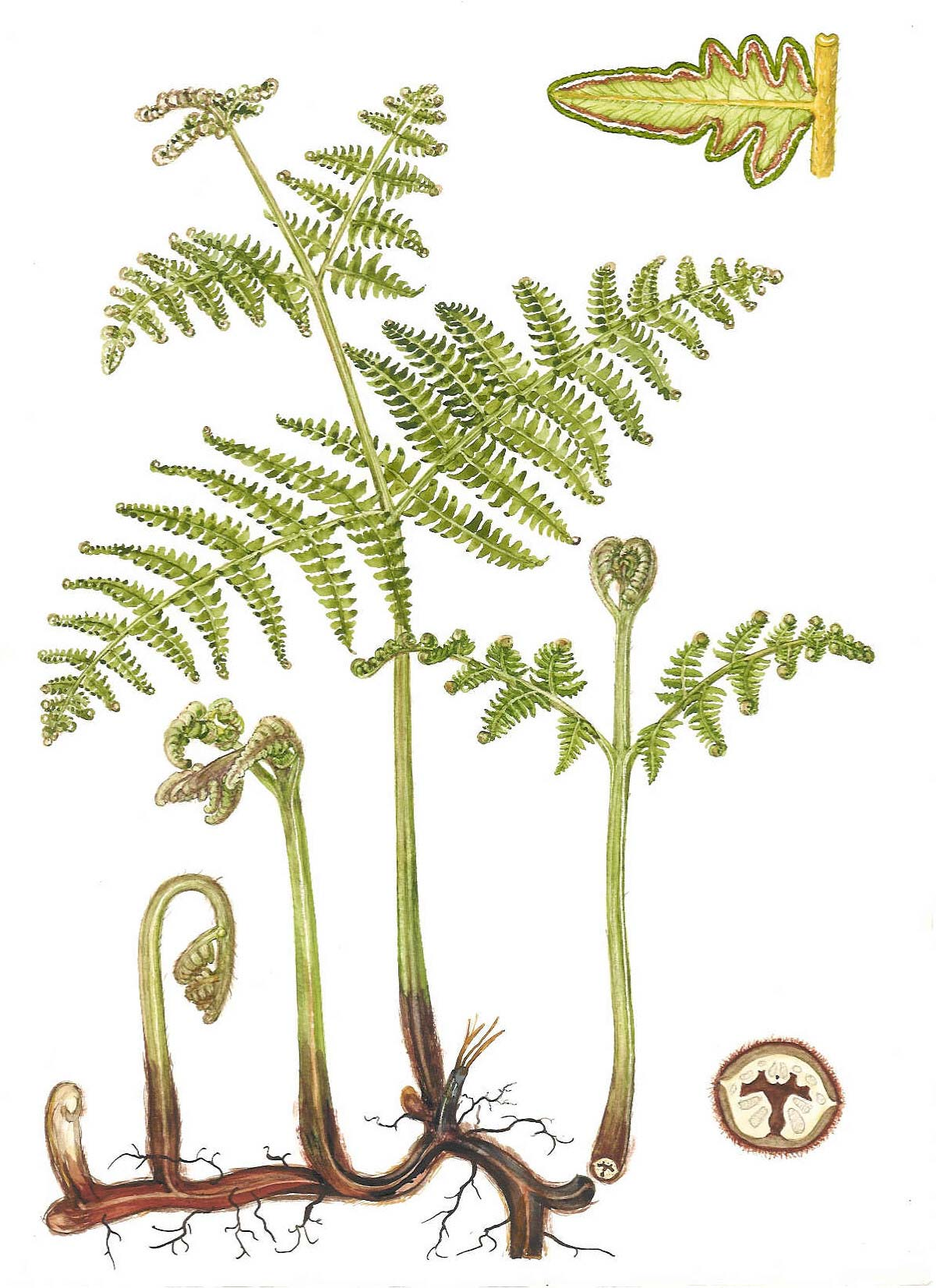
Croziers, fronds, rhizomes of bracken fern

The presence of ptaquiloside has been detected in a variety of ferns, including the species in the genera Pteridium (bracken), Pteris, Microlepia, and Hypolepis. Pteridium aquilinum (commonly known as bracken fern) is the most common ptaquiloside-containing fern with a wide geographical and ecological distribution. It is present in all continents from subtropic to subarctic areas. Bracken fern is a very adaptable plant and is capable of forming dense, rapidly expanding populations in course of the first phases of the ecological succession in forest cleanings and other disturbed rural areas. Its aggressive growth, characterized by an extensive rhizome system and rapidly growing fronds, sometimes enables it to be a dominant species in certain plant communities. The ptaquiloside content of bracken varies widely across species and changes with the part of the plant, the plant growing site and the collecting season. According to previous studies, the concentrations of ptaquiloside in bracken varied between 0 and 1% of the dry weight of the plant. Generally, ptaquiloside is found to occur in the highest concentrations in the young developing parts of bracken, such as the croziers and unfolding parts during the spring and early summer, while the concentrations of ptaquiloside in the rhizomes are rather low. However, studies on the concentrations of ptaquiloside in Danish bracken by Rasmussen et al. showed that the concentrations of ptaquiloside in the rhizomes were significantly higher than the previously reported values.

Ptaquiloside can pass into the milk produced by bracken-fed cows and sheep. In 1996, Alonso-Amelot, Smith and co-workers found that ptaquiloside was excreted in milk at a concentration of 8.6 ± 1.2% of the amount ingested by a cow from bracken, and was linearly dose-dependent. On the basis of their experiments and the assumption that a person drinks 0.5 litres of milk daily, they estimated that this person might ingest about 10 mg of ptaquiloside per day, although only some of that amount will be absorbed. Ptaquiloside can also leach from the bracken leaves into water and soil. Numerous studies have reported the presence of ptaquiloside in the underground/surface water, and soil near bracken vegetation. The degradation speed of ptaquiloside in the soil is affected by the acidity, clay content, carbon content, temperature and presumably microbioactivity. Acidic condition (pH<4) and high temperature (at least 25 °C) facilitate ptaquiloside degradation, while the half-life of ptaquiloside in less acidic sandy soil is reported to be between 150 and 180 hours.

=== Ways of ptaquiloside exposure ===
Main routes that can lead to human exposure to the toxic effects of bracken fern include ingestion of the plant (particularly the croziers and young fronds), inhalation of the airborne spores, consumption of the milk and meat of affected animals, and drinking ptaquiloside contaminated water.

== Mechanism of action ==
Ptaquiloside has unstable chemical structure and readily undergoes glucose liberation. The resulting ptaquilodienone is the active form of ptaquiloside and accounts for the observed biological effects. The cyclopropyl group in the dienone is highly reactive as an electrophile, not only because it is conjugated with the keto group, but because it also constitutes a cyclopropyl carbinol system, from which the facile formation of the stable non-classical cation is well-known.

=== General mechanism ===
In acidic conditions, ptaquiloside gradually undergoes aromatization with the elimination of D-glucose to afford ptaquilosin, and finally pterosin B. Under weakly alkaline conditions, ptaquiloside and its aglycone ptaquilosin are converted into an unstable conjugated dienone intermediate. This ptaquilodienone is the activated form of ptaquiloside and is regarded as the ultimate carcinogen of bracken ferns. Due to the constitution of a cyclopropyl carbinol system, ptaquilodienone is a strong electrophile and acts as a powerful alkylating agent that reacts directly with biological nucleophiles including amino acids, nucleosides, and nucleotides under weakly acidic conditions at room temperature (as shown in the scheme below).

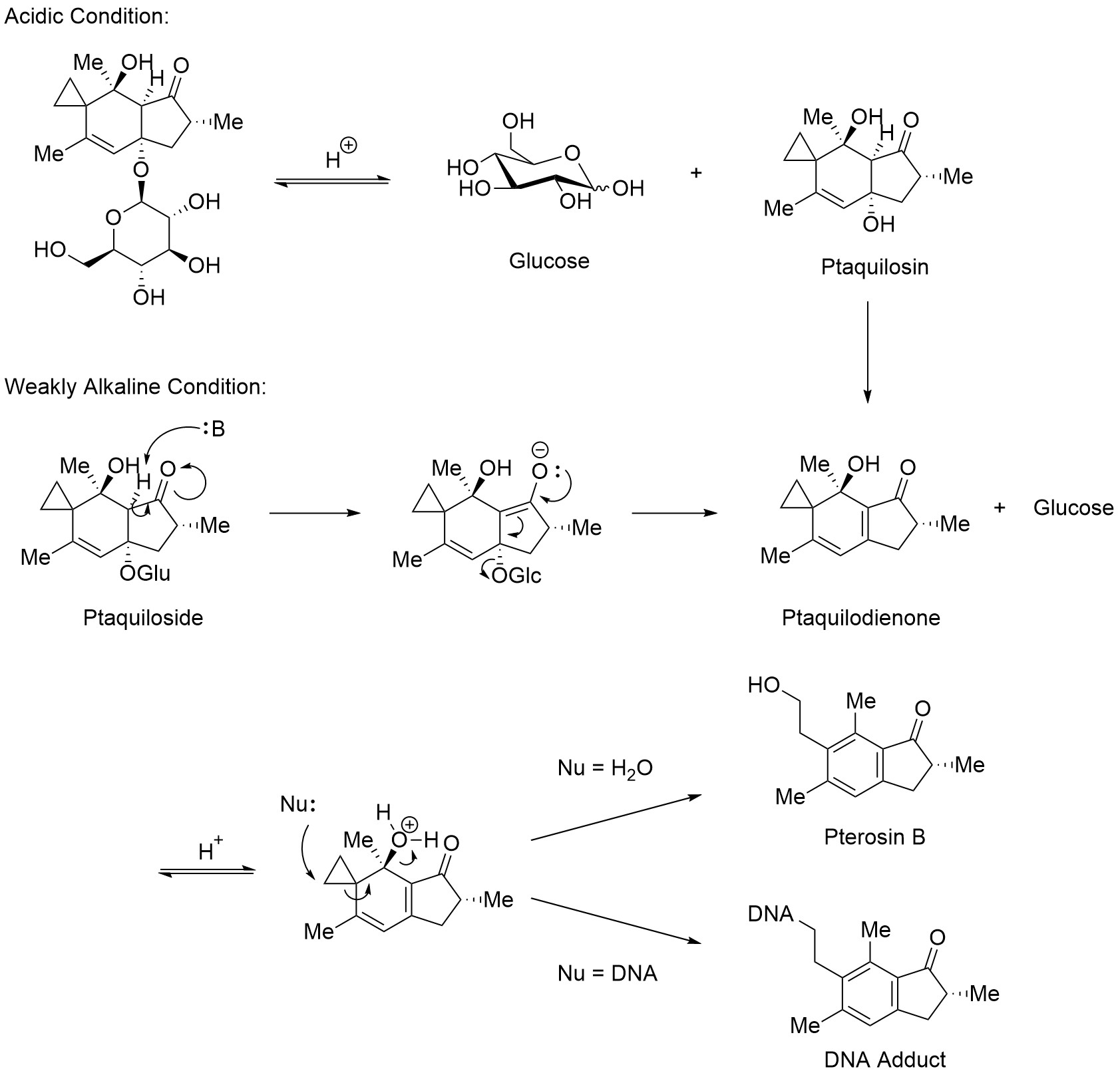
The mechanism of action of ptaquiloside

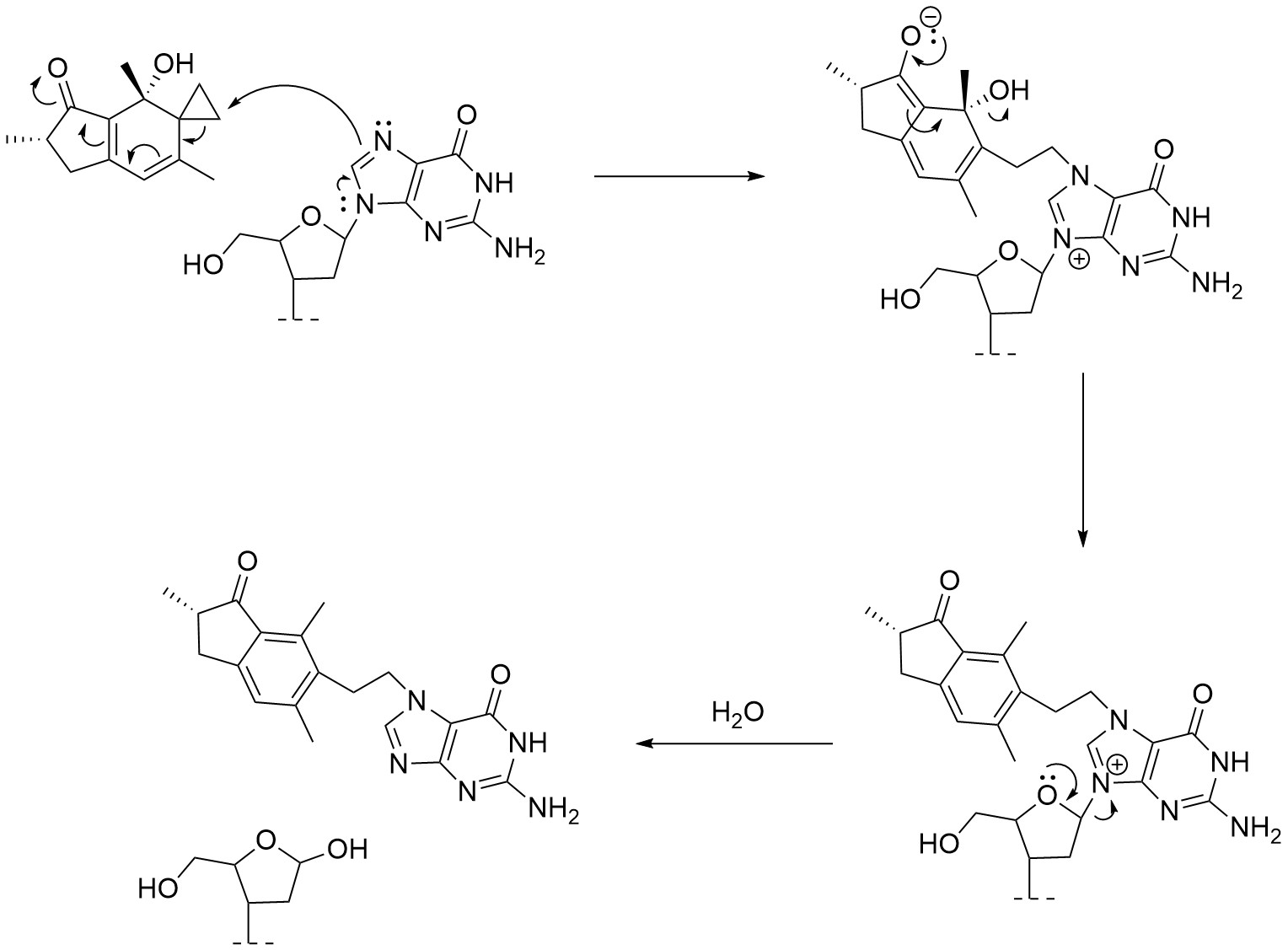
Mechanism of ptaquilodienone with deoxytetranucleotide

=== Under physiological conditions ===
Under physiological conditions, ptaquiloside readily liberates glucose to produce the ptaquilodienone. The alkylation of amino acids with the dienone mostly takes place at the thiol group in cysteine, glutathione and methionine. The alkylation at the carboxylate group of each amino acid, forming the corresponding ester, is also observed to a small extent based on the previously reported literature. The dienone reacts with both adenine (majorly at N-3) and guanine (majorly at N-7) residues of DNA to form the DNA adducts. The alkylation induces spontaneous depurination and cleavage of DNA at adenine base site. In a model reaction with a deoxytetranucleotide (as shown on the right), a covalent adduct is found at a guanine residue and the N-glycosidic bond breaks to release the adduct. In 1998, Prakash, Smith and co-workers showed that the alkylation of adenine by ptaquiloside in codon 61 followed by depurination and error in the DNA synthesis resulted in the activation of H-ras proto-oncogene in the ileum of calves fed bracken.

== Syndromes ==
Bracken is known to have various biological effects, such as carcinogenicity and its well-defined syndromes in livestock and laboratory animals. Ptaquiloside is proved to be responsible for several of these biological effects, some of which are species specific.

=== Ruminants ===
Cattle that consume bracken ferns develop acute bracken poisoning and chronic bovine enzootic haematuria (BEH). The main feature of acute bracken poisoning in cattle is the depression of bone marrow activity, which gives rise to severe leucopenia (particularly of the granulocytes), thrombocytopenia, and acute haemorrhagic crisis. However, most of the researchers believe ptaquiloside is not the direct causing agent of the acute bracken fern poisoning. The main feature of haematuria is urinary bladder tumors and haematuria in cattle after prolonged exposure to bracken. Based on the extensive studies, a positive correlation is shown between the ptquiloside concentration and the incidence of BEH.

Sheep fed by a diet containing bracken develop acute haemorrhagic disease and bright blindness. The main features of the blindness include progressive retinal atrophy and stenosis of the blood vessels. In 1993, Yamada group proved ptaquiloside was the compound causing retinal degeneration.

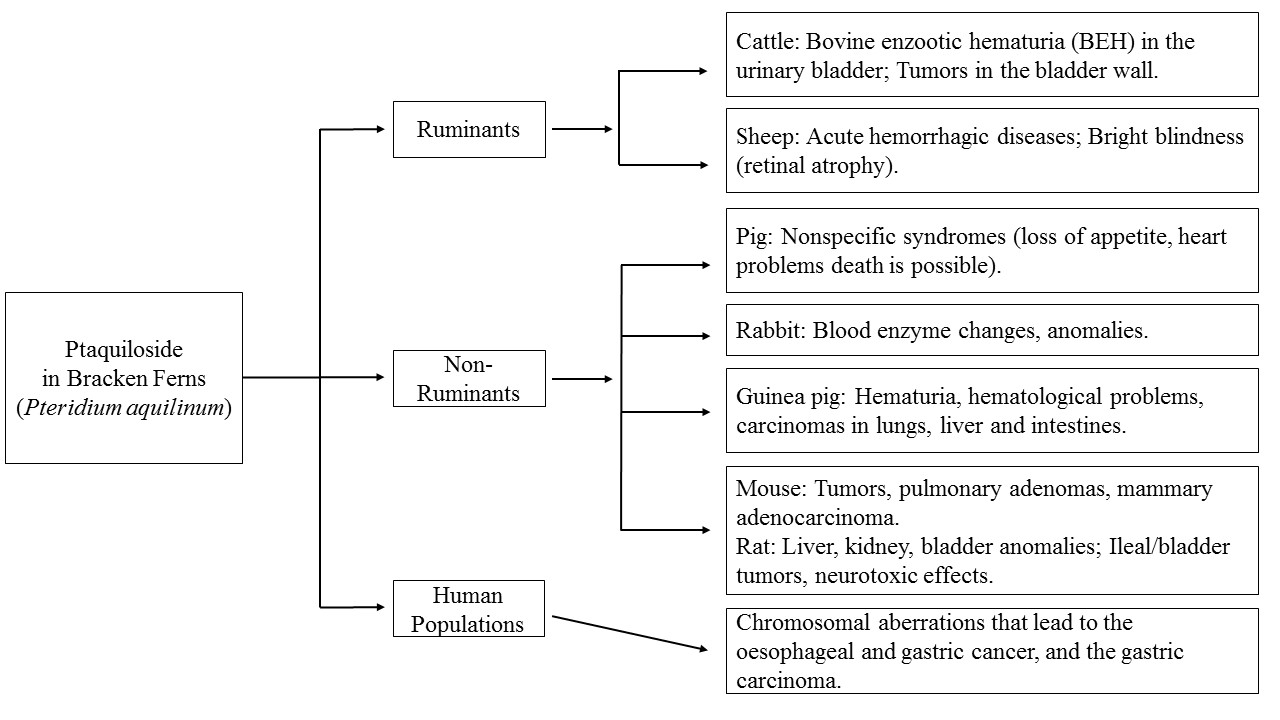
Species-specific syndromes caused by ptaquiloside

=== Non-ruminants ===
Rats that were given a diet containing ptaquiloside for a prolonged period developed tumors in both the ileum and urinary bladder. Prakash, Smith and co-workers showed that ptaquiloside-induced carcinogenesis was initiated by the activation of the H-ras oncogene. Other non-ruminants such as pig, rabbit, and guinea pig, also develop syndromes after ingestion of ptaquiloside, which include haematuria, tumors and organ abnormities (see the diagram).

=== Human populations ===
Bracken fern increases the oncogenic risk in humans. Epidemiological survey revealed that bracken fern consumption was positively correlated with esophageal cancer and with gastric cancer in many geographical areas of the world. In 1989, Natori and co-workers showed that ptaquiloside had clastogenic effect and caused chromosomal aberration in mammalian cells. In 2003, Santos group reported significantly increased levels of chromosomal abnormalities, such as chromatid breaks in cultured peripheral lymphocytes.

== Control and detection ==
The use of bracken fern as human food is mainly a historical question. The rhizomes of these plants served as human food in Scotland during the First World War. In America (USA, Canada), Russia, China and Japan, fern is grown commercially for human use. The usual procedure that is performed before eating the plant is to pre-treat the fern with boiling water in the presence of different chemicals, such as sodium bicarbonate and wood ash, to degrade or inactivate ptaquiloside and other toxic agents. Nevertheless, some carcinogenic activity persists even after the treatment. As shown by Kamon and Hirayama, the risk of oesophageal cancer was increased approximately by 2.1 in men and 3.7 in women who regularly consume bracken in Japan. Recent researches have suggested that sulfur-containing amino acids can potentially be used under appropriate conditions as detoxifying agents for ptaquiloside and selenium supplementation can prevent as well as reverse the immunotoxic effects induced by ptaquiloside.

Ptaquiloside in the aqueous extract of bracken can be detected using different instrumental methods: thin-layer chromatography–densitometry (TLC-densitometry), high-performance liquid chromatography (HPLC), gas chromatography–mass spectrometry (GCMS), and liquid chromatography–mass spectrometry (LC-MS). The diagnostic tests of ptaquiloside inside cells include gene mutation detection, immunohistochemical detection of tumor biomarkers, chromosomal aberrations, oxidative stress for EBH, PCR, real-time PCR and DNase-SISPA (sequence-independent single primer amplification).

== Synthesis ==
=== Total synthesis ===
In 1989 and 1993, Yamada and co-workers reported the first enantioselective total synthesis of both the enantiomers of ptaquilosin, the aglycone of ptaquiloside. In the first step, the menthyl ester of cyclopentane-1,2-dicarboxylic acid 1 was partially hydrolyzed to afford the monomenthyl ester, which was later alkylated with methallyl bromide in the presence of HMPA to selectively produce 2. The product 2 was then converted to the acid chloride and treated with stannic chloride to effect Friedel-Crafts acylation to give enone 3. Hydride reduction, selective oxidation of the allylic alcohol, and silylation were then performed to provide compound 4. On treatment with base and a chloroethyl sulfonium salt, a mixture of spirocyclopropanes was obtained. The minor product 5a can be isomerized with p-toluenesulfonic acid to 5b with 81% yield. Desaturation by selenylation/dehydroselenation and basic peroxide oxidation afforded epoxide 6. Mild reduction, methyl Grignard addition, and oxidation gave compound 7. Methylation of the cyclopentanone under Noyori's condition using the TASF enolate produced a mixture of isomers. The undesired isomer 8a can be equilibriumed with potassium tert-butoxide in 81% yield to exclusively generate 8b. Reduction, deprotection, and oxidation afforded 9. On treatment with oxygen in warm ethyl acetate, the aldehyde on 9 was oxidized to the acyl radical for decarbonylation. Stereoselective trapping of the tertiary radical by oxygen gave the hydroperoxide 10. Under mild reduction, the naturally occurred (-)-ptaquilosin 11 was obtained. The Yamada's synthesis proceeded in 20 steps with an overall yield of 2.9%. Similarly, the unnatural (+)-enantiomer of ptaquilosin was synthesized from the diastereomer of 2.

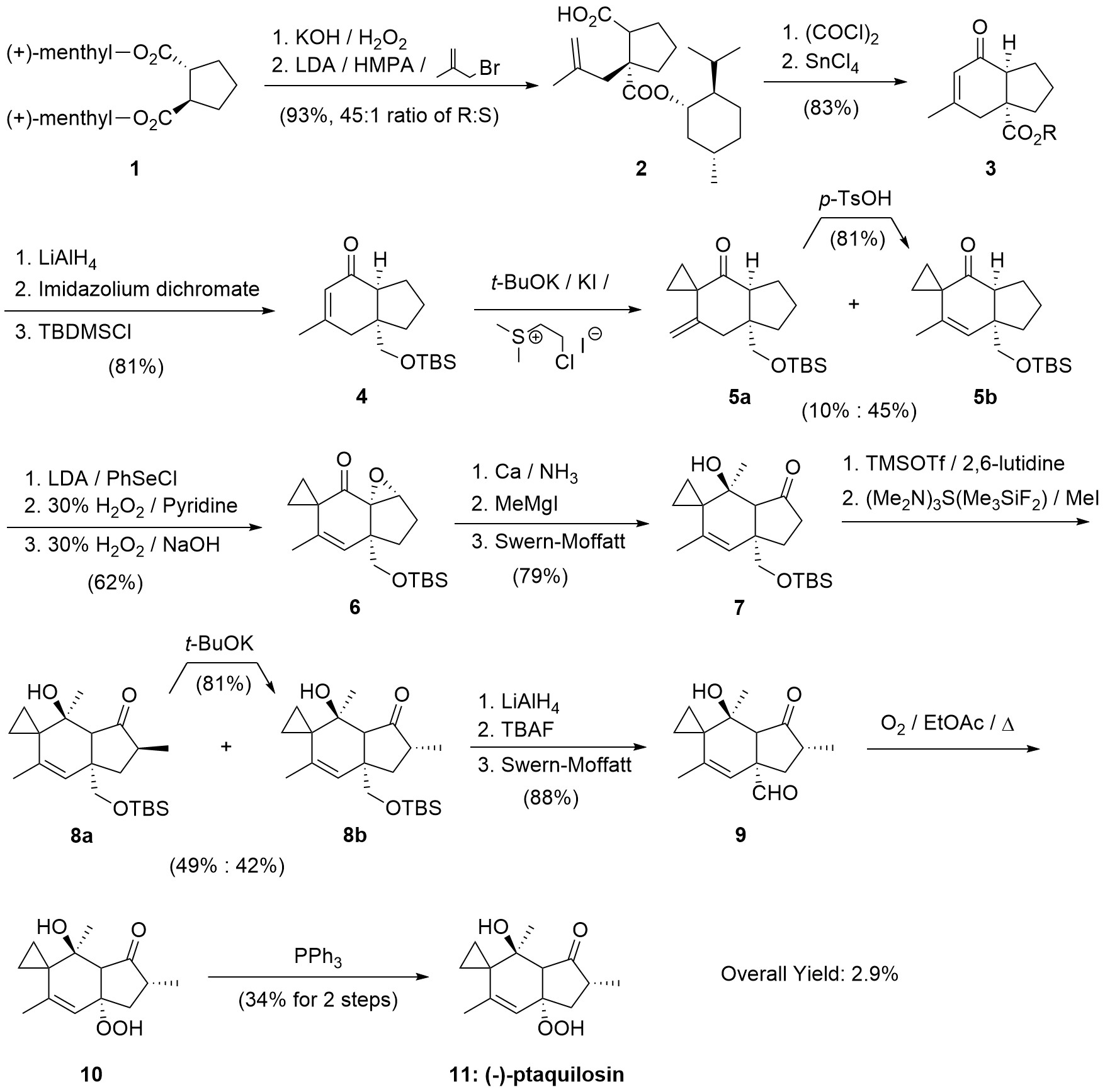
Total synthesis of (-)-ptaquilosin

Multiple synthetic studies directed towards ptaquilosin 11 have been reported since 1989. In 1994, Padwa and co-workers described the synthesis of the core skeleton of ptaquilosin by a highly convergent approach. In 1995, Cossy and co-workers reported novel routes to the racemic and optically active ptaquilosin skeleton. Their properly functionalized tricyclic compound would be of great utility for the synthesis of 11.
