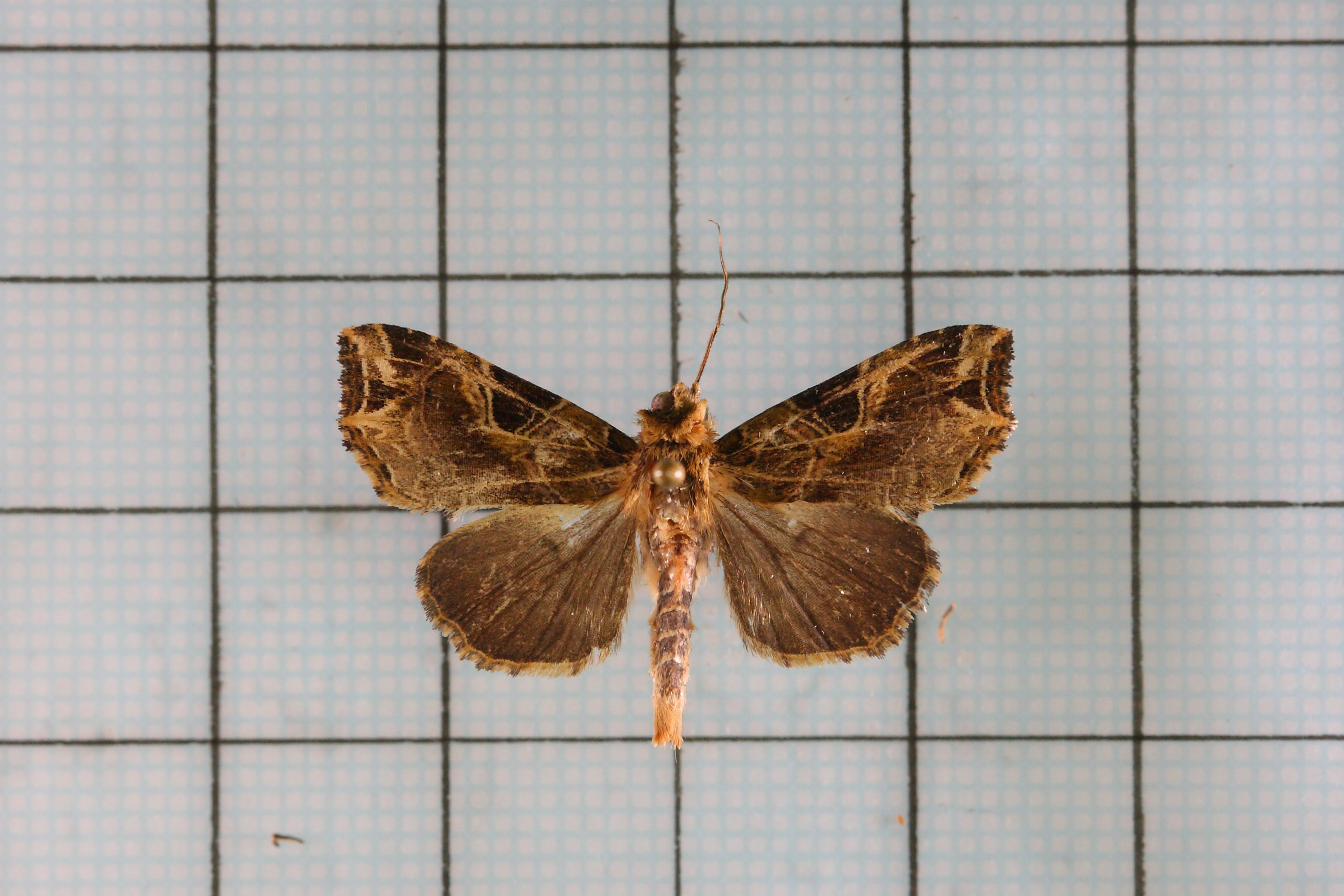

Scientific classification
- Kingdom: Animalia
- Phylum: Arthropoda
- Class: Insecta
- Order: Lepidoptera
- Superfamily: Noctuoidea
- Family: Noctuidae
- Genus: Callopistria
- Species: C. pulchrilinea

Binomial name
- Callopistria pulchrilinea (Walker, 1862)

Synonyms
- Obana pulchrilinea Walker, 1862

= Callopistria pulchrilinea =

Species of moth

Callopistria pulchrilinea is a moth of the family Noctuidae. It is widely distributed from the Oriental region to Africa, including Japan, Taiwan, China (Tibet), India, Sri Lanka, Vietnam, Myanmar, Borneo, Singapore, Indonesia (Amboina), Nepal and western Africa (Gabon).

The wingspan is 24–25 mm for males and 22–23 mm for females.

The larvae have been recorded feeding on Selaginella uncinata and Selaginella delicatula. Full-grown larvae have a light green ground colour.
