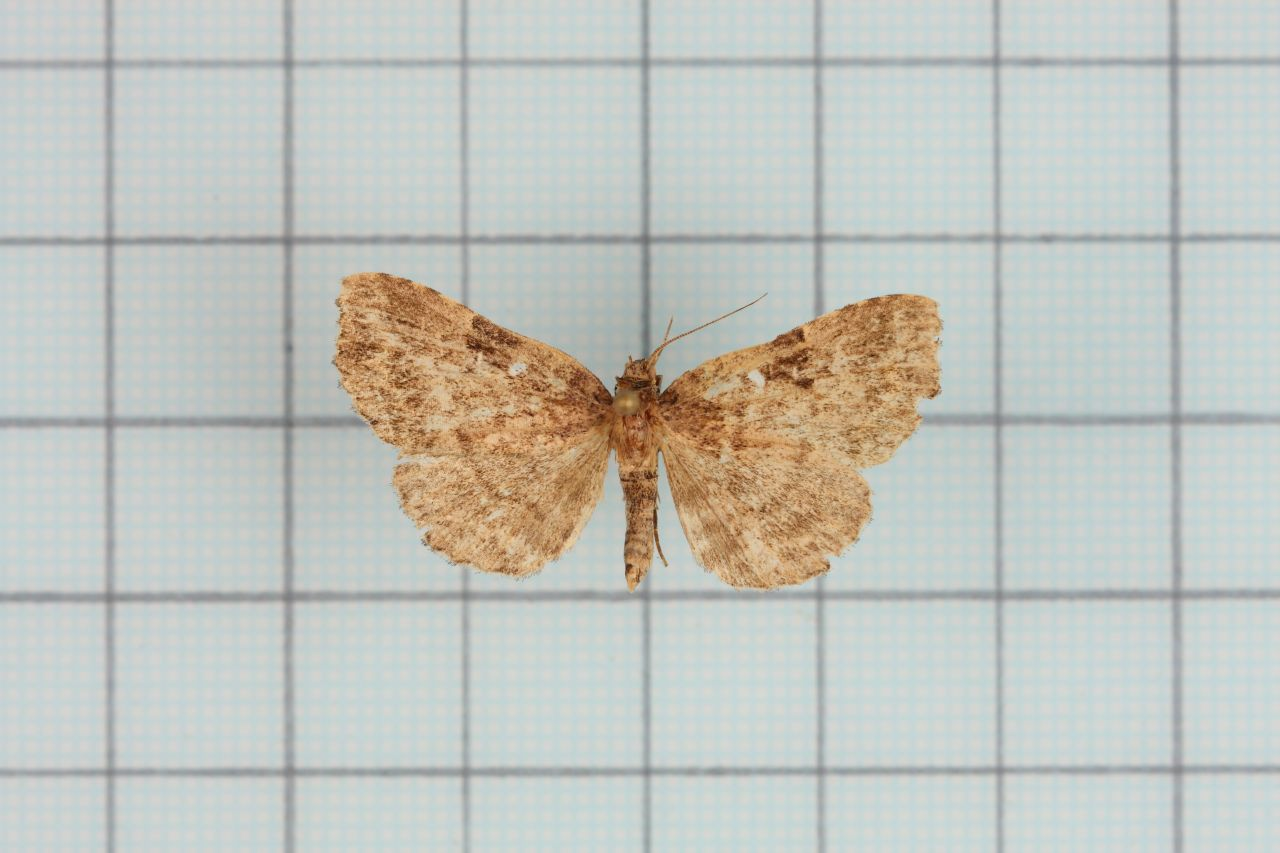

Scientific classification
- Domain: Eukaryota
- Kingdom: Animalia
- Phylum: Arthropoda
- Class: Insecta
- Order: Lepidoptera
- Superfamily: Noctuoidea
- Family: Noctuidae
- Genus: Callopistria
- Species: C. delicata

Binomial name
- Callopistria delicata Chang, 1991

= Callopistria delicata =

Species of moth

Callopistria delicata is a species of moth in the family Noctuidae, subfamily Eriopinae. It was first described as a new species by Mr. Bao-Shing Chang in 1991. The type locality is Henglong, Miaoli, and the holotype and paratype specimens are currently depositedin the National Museum of Natural Science, Taichuang, Taiwan.

The closely related species of Callopistria delicata are currently known as Callopistria albolineola (Graeser, [1889] 1888) and Callopistria yerburii Butler, 1884.
