= Paratype nigra =

Scientific classification
- Domain: Eukaryota
- Kingdom: Animalia
- Phylum: Arthropoda
- Class: Insecta
- Order: Lepidoptera
- Superfamily: Noctuoidea
- Family: Erebidae
- Subfamily: Arctiinae
- Tribe: Lithosiini
- Genus: Paratype
- Species: P. nigra

Binomial name
- Paratype nigra (Reich, 1936)

Synonyms
- Euryptidia nigra Reich, 1936

Species of moth

Paratype nigra is a moth in the subfamily Arctiinae. It was described by Reich in 1936. It is found in Brazil.
