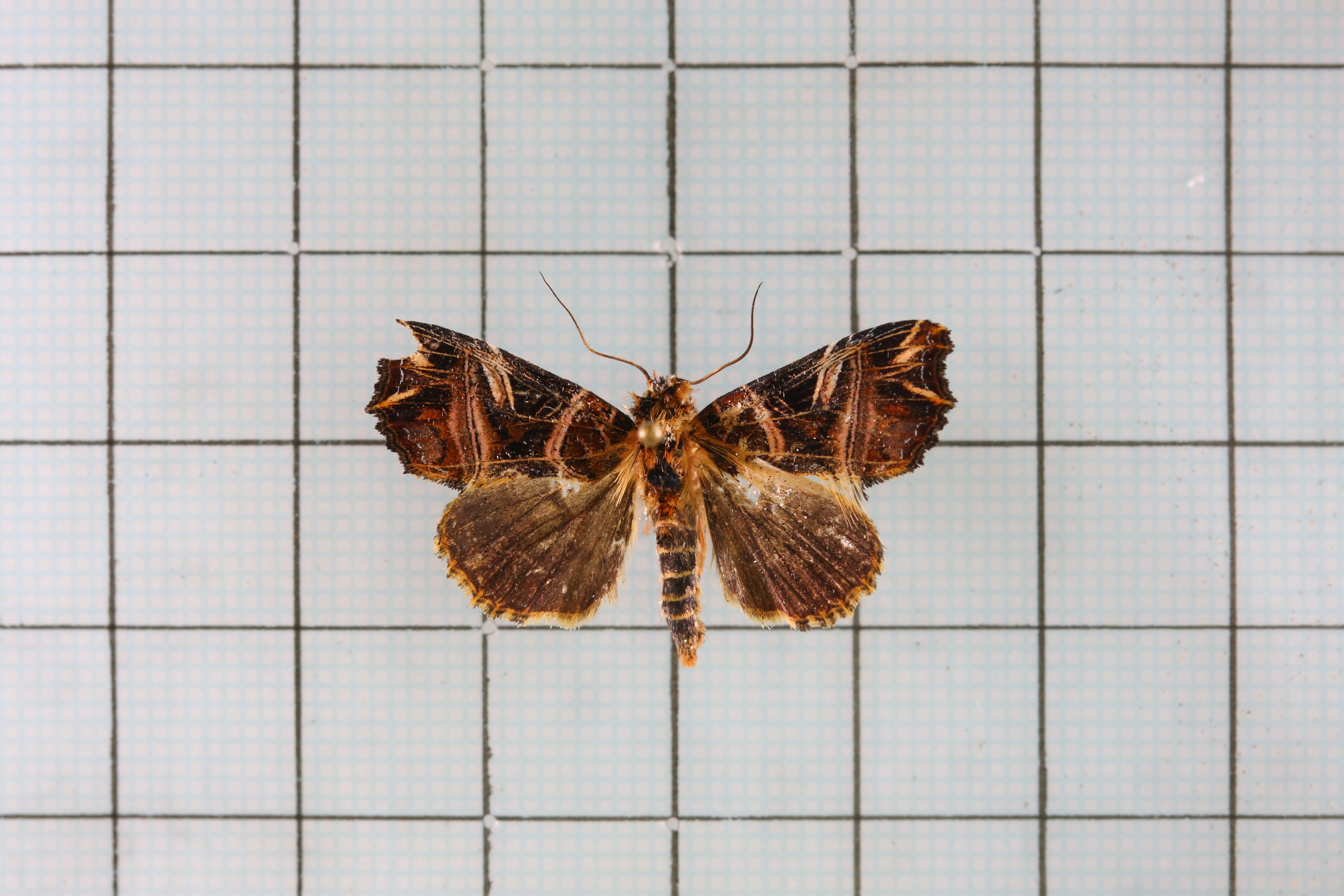

Scientific classification
- Domain: Eukaryota
- Kingdom: Animalia
- Phylum: Arthropoda
- Class: Insecta
- Order: Lepidoptera
- Superfamily: Noctuoidea
- Family: Noctuidae
- Genus: Callopistria
- Species: C. nobilior

Binomial name
- Callopistria nobilior Eda, 2000

= Callopistria nobilior =

Species of moth

Callopistria nobilior is a moth of the family Noctuidae. It is found in Taiwan and Japan.

The wingspan is 29–34 mm for males and 28–32 mm for females.

The larvae have been recorded feeding on Histiopteris incisa, Microlepia krameri, Microlepia obtusiloba, Microlepia speluncae and Microlepia strigosa.
