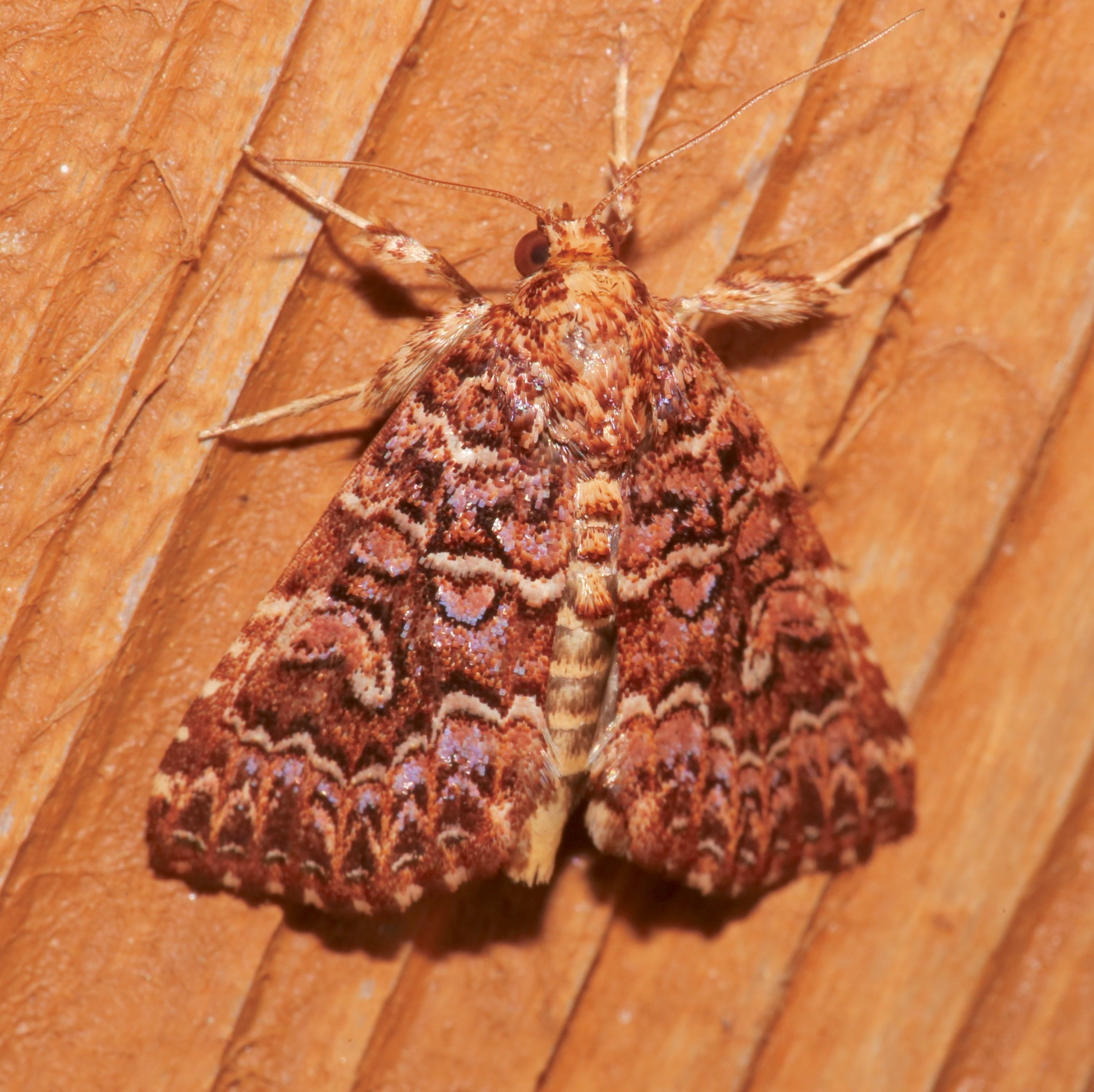

Scientific classification
- Kingdom: Animalia
- Phylum: Arthropoda
- Class: Insecta
- Order: Lepidoptera
- Superfamily: Noctuoidea
- Family: Noctuidae
- Genus: Callopistria
- Species: C. granitosa

Binomial name
- Callopistria granitosa (Guenée, 1852)

= Callopistria granitosa =

Species of moth

Callopistria granitosa, the granitose fern moth, is a species of moth in the family Noctuidae (the owlet moths).

The MONA or Hodges number for Callopistria granitosa is 9632.
