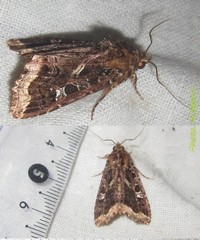

Scientific classification
- Kingdom: Animalia
- Phylum: Arthropoda
- Class: Insecta
- Order: Lepidoptera
- Superfamily: Noctuoidea
- Family: Noctuidae
- Genus: Callopistria
- Species: C. bernei

Binomial name
- Callopistria bernei Viette, 1985

= Callopistria bernei =

Species of moth

Callopistria bernei is a moth of the family Noctuidae. This species can be found on Réunion.
