= Paratype ira =

Scientific classification
- Domain: Eukaryota
- Kingdom: Animalia
- Phylum: Arthropoda
- Class: Insecta
- Order: Lepidoptera
- Superfamily: Noctuoidea
- Family: Erebidae
- Subfamily: Arctiinae
- Tribe: Lithosiini
- Genus: Paratype
- Species: P. ira

Binomial name
- Paratype ira ( H. Druce, 1889)

Synonyms
- Ptychoglene ira H. Druce, 1889

Species of moth

Paratype ira is a moth in the subfamily Arctiinae. It was described by Herbert Druce in 1889. It is found in Mexico.
