= Paratype basivitta =

Scientific classification
- Kingdom: Animalia
- Phylum: Arthropoda
- Class: Insecta
- Order: Lepidoptera
- Superfamily: Noctuoidea
- Family: Erebidae
- Subfamily: Arctiinae
- Tribe: Lithosiini
- Genus: Paratype
- Species: P. basivitta

Binomial name
- Paratype basivitta (Walker, 1854)

Synonyms
- Josia basivitta Walker, 1854

Species of moth

Paratype basivitta is a moth in the subfamily Arctiinae. It was described by Francis Walker in 1854. It is found in Rio de Janeiro, Brazil.
