= Paratype trifera =

Scientific classification
- Kingdom: Animalia
- Phylum: Arthropoda
- Class: Insecta
- Order: Lepidoptera
- Superfamily: Noctuoidea
- Family: Erebidae
- Subfamily: Arctiinae
- Tribe: Lithosiini
- Genus: Paratype
- Species: P. trifera

Binomial name
- Paratype trifera Walker, 1869

Synonyms
- Lama trifera Walker, 1869; Paratype extensa Draudt, 1919; Paratype laeticolor Felder, 1874; Lama striata Butler, 1877; Paratype walkeri Strand, 1922

Species of moth

Paratype trifera is a moth in the subfamily Arctiinae. It was described by Francis Walker in 1869. It is found in Brazil.
