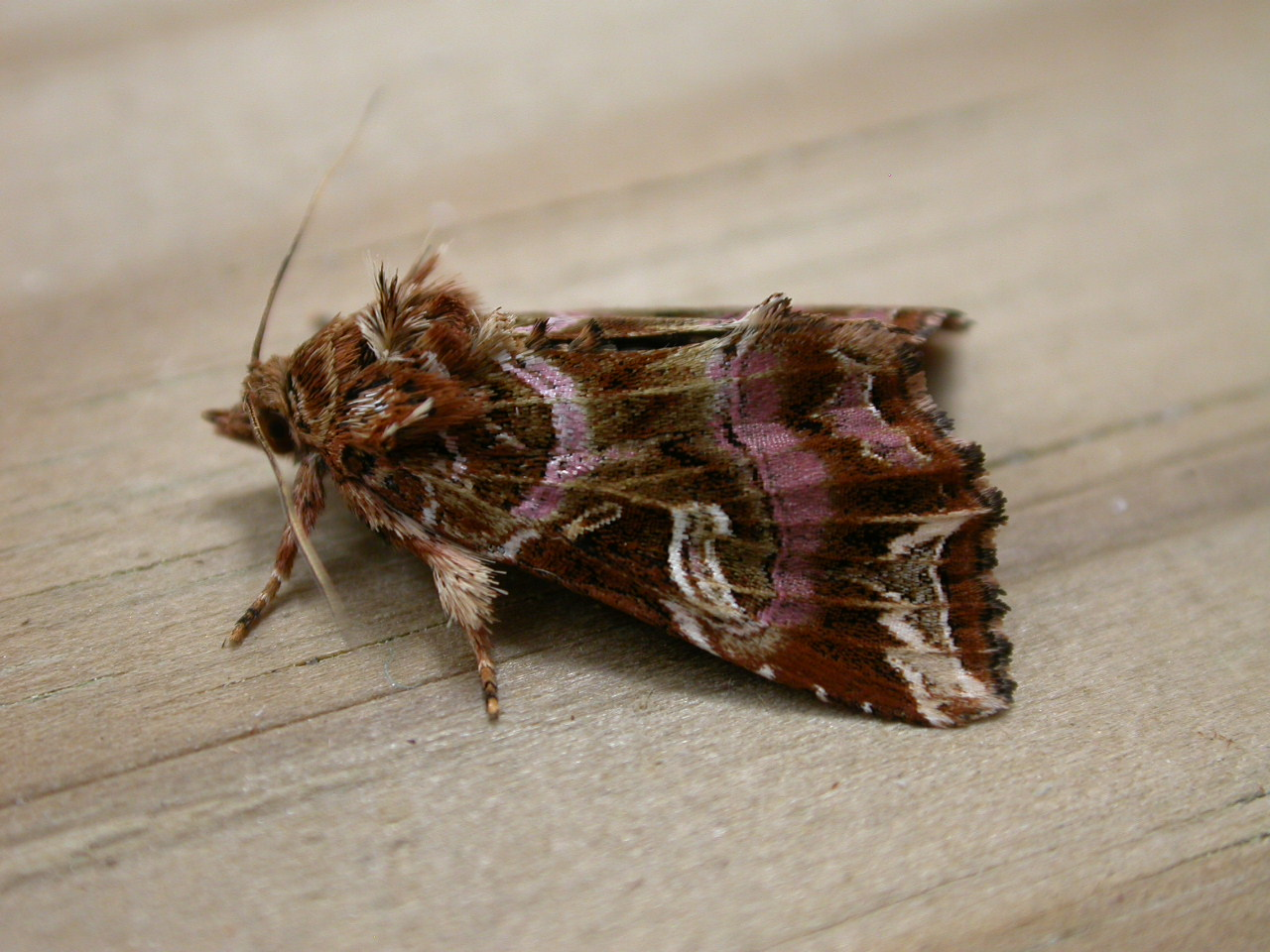

Scientific classification
- Kingdom: Animalia
- Phylum: Arthropoda
- Class: Insecta
- Order: Lepidoptera
- Superfamily: Noctuoidea
- Family: Noctuidae
- Genus: Callopistria
- Species: C. juventina

Binomial name
- Callopistria juventina (Stoll, 1782)

Synonyms
- Callopistria purpureofasciata

= Callopistria juventina =

Latin

Species of moth

Callopistria juventina, the Latin name, is a moth of the family Noctuidae. The species is found across the Palearctic realm.

== Technical description and variation ==
E. juventina Cram. (= purpureofasciata Piller, lagopus Esp., pteridis F., formosissimalis Hbn.) (44 d). Forewing olive brown, shaded in parts with black; the veins pale, towards termen rosy and cream coloured; inner and outer lines double, finely black, filled in with rosy and followed by rosy bands, that beyond outer line broad [en]; both lines commence on costa as white oblique strigae before the subcostal angulation; stigmata olive brown tinged with rosy, their annuli white, more prominent in the reniform, and forming a sort of hook at lower extremity externally; sometimes a rosy streak on submedian fold beyond the very obscure claviform; subterminal line yellowish white, forming oblique streaks above veins 6 and 7, followed by a pale apical patch, angled inwards above 5 and acutely outwards at 4, thence obscure; a lunulate yellowish white line before termen; the terminal area rosy; fringe chequered, ochreous and dark olive brown; hindwing ochreous suffused with pale fuscous, with broad dark terminal border, an outer line and cell spot; the Japanese form obscura Btlr. (44 d) It is duller; all the rosy tints are greatly reduced in extent and brilliancy. Larva green, with whitish or yellowish oblique lunular subdorsal markings, lateral line yellowish white; all the yellowish markings sometimes edged with pink; head reddish. The wingspan is 34–38 mm.

== Biology ==
The moths fly from June to July, depending on the location.

The caterpillars feed on Pteridium aquilinum.
