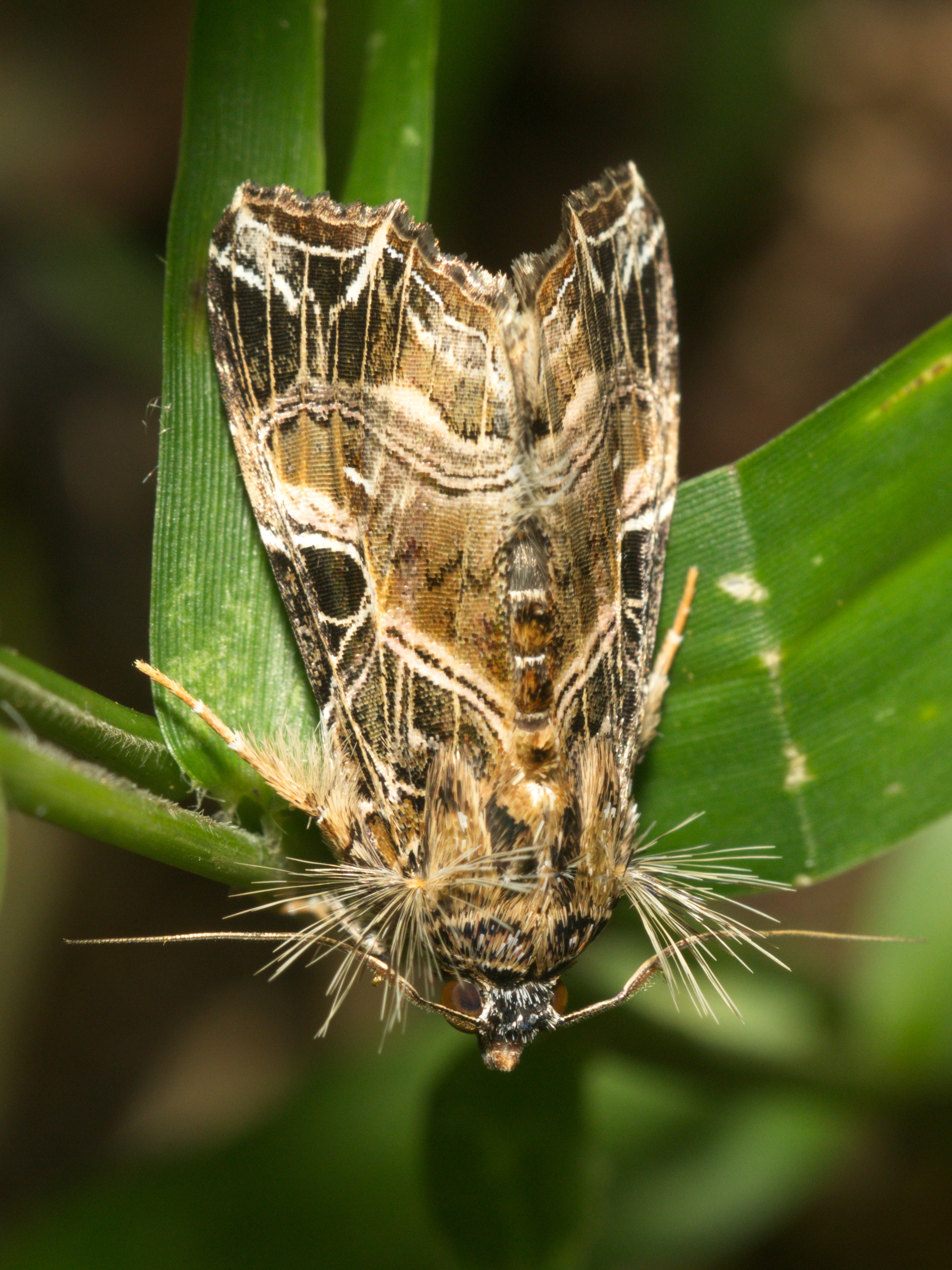
- adult
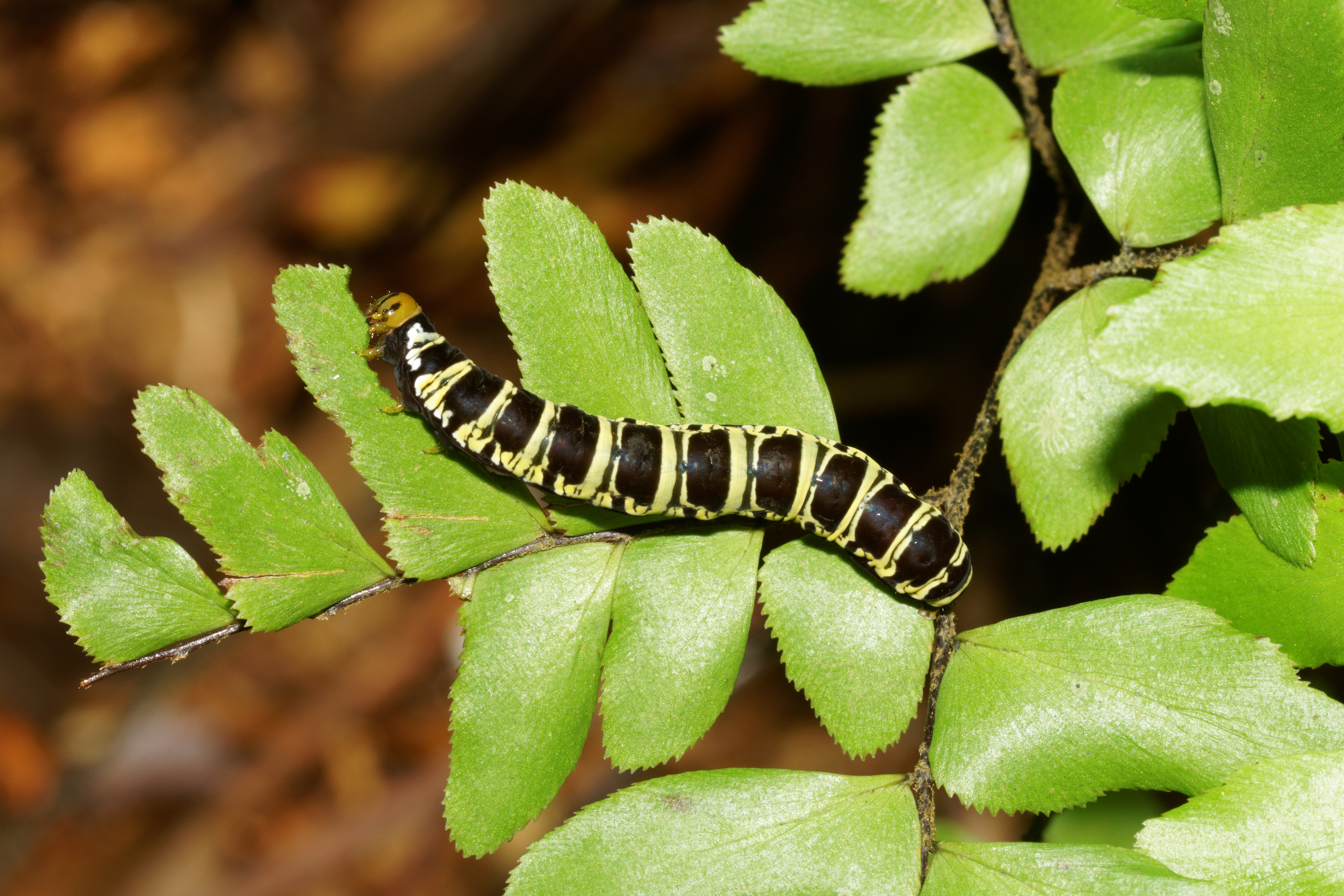
- larva

Scientific classification
- Kingdom: Animalia
- Phylum: Arthropoda
- Class: Insecta
- Order: Lepidoptera
- Superfamily: Noctuoidea
- Family: Noctuidae
- Genus: Callopistria
- Species: C. rivularis

Binomial name
- Callopistria rivularis Walker, 1858

Synonyms
- Eriopus xanthopera; Eriopus cyclopis

= Callopistria rivularis =

Species of moth

Callopistria rivularis is a species of moth of the family Noctuidae. It is found from the Indo-Australian tropics of India, Sri Lanka up to the Solomon Islands and Fiji.

== Description ==
Wingspan is about 30mm. Antennae of male slightly knotted and contorted at middle. Tibia, and tarsi of fore legs hairy, as well as spurs of mid legs. Fore wings with angled outer margin. Head, thorax and abdomen dark. Fore wings blackish, clouded with grey and irrorated with ochreous color. Veins ochreous. There is a double subbasal ochreous line and similar regularly curved antemedial line. Orbicular and reniform elongate. Postmedial line much excurved beyond the cell and forming with the special question mark shape. Some prominent irregularly disposed streaks can be seen on apical area. Tufts at base and outer angle long, where the latter is whitish. Hind wings with dark fuscous color and pale colored cilia. Ventral side dark with obscure cell-spot and postmedial line.
