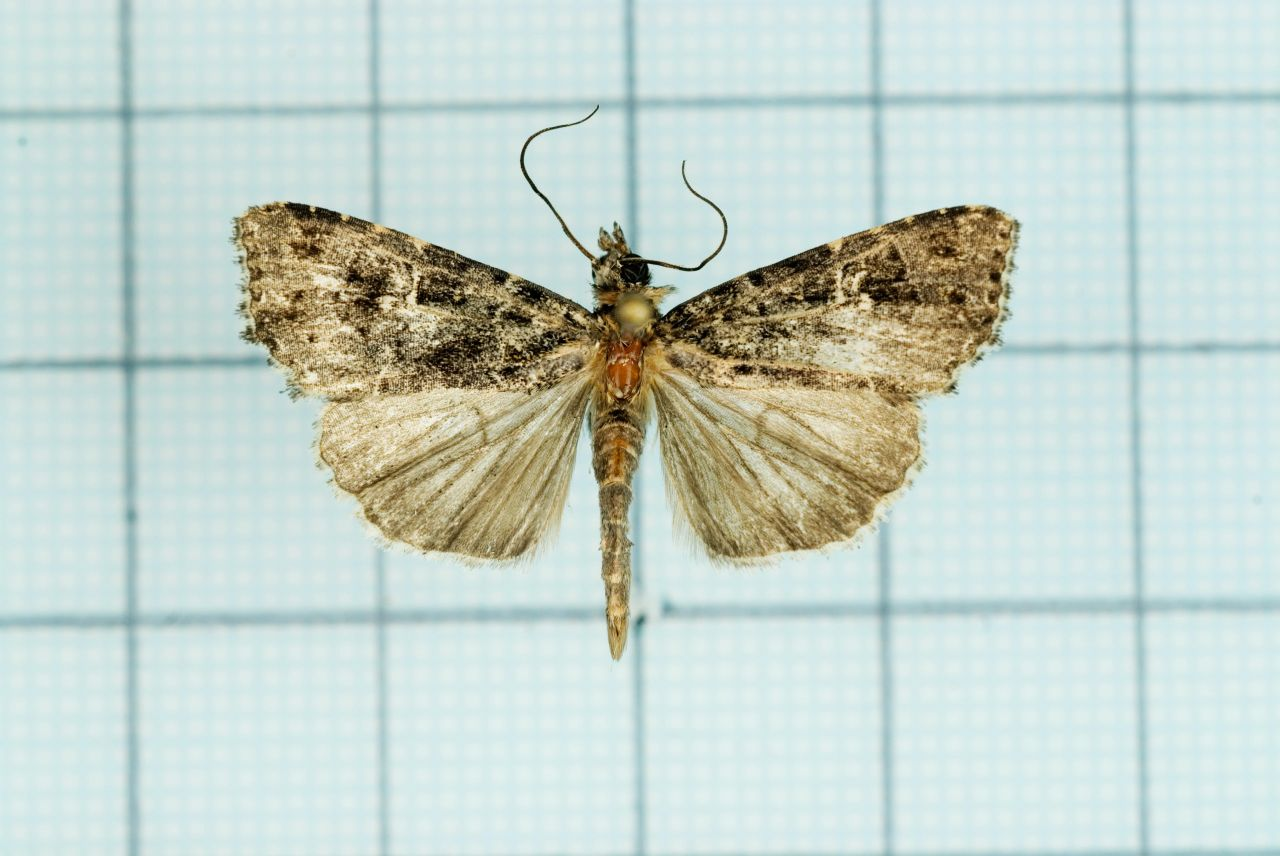
- Female
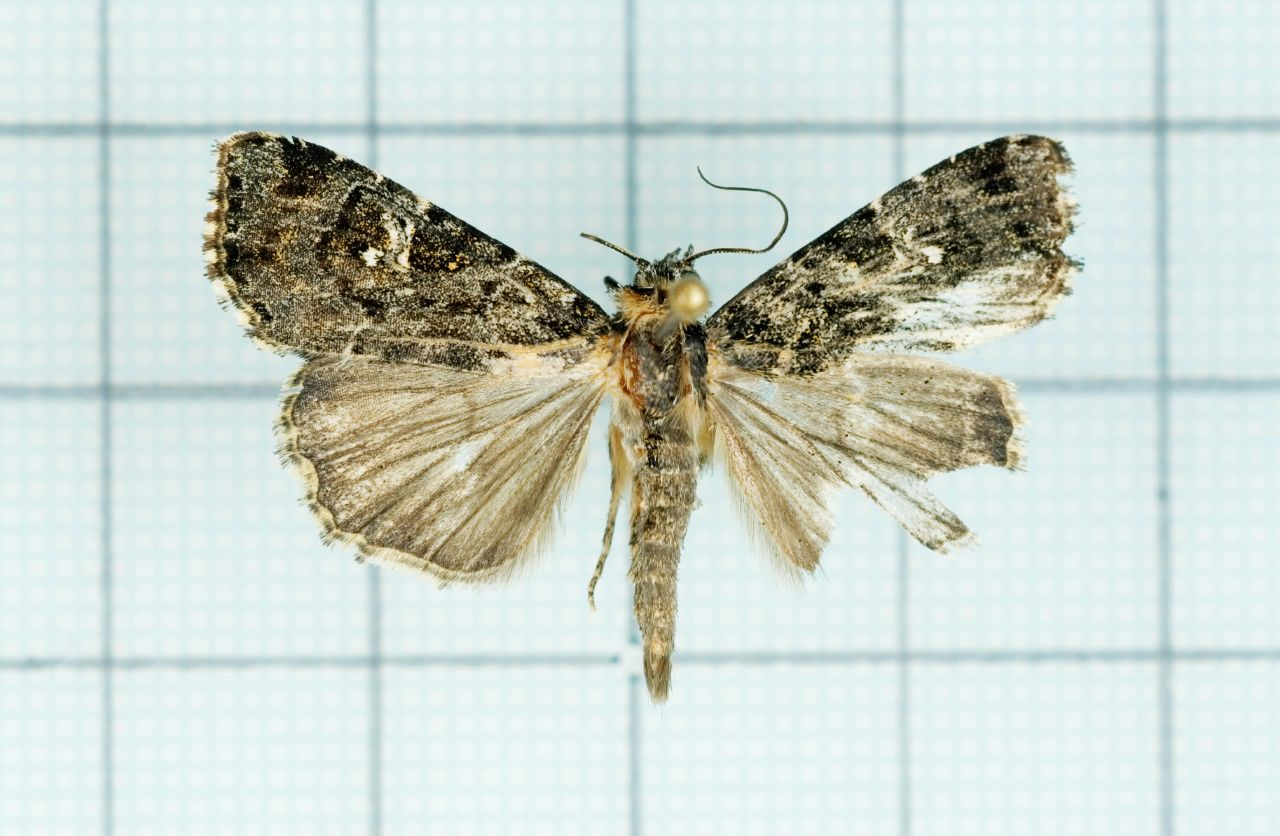
- Male

Scientific classification
- Domain: Eukaryota
- Kingdom: Animalia
- Phylum: Arthropoda
- Class: Insecta
- Order: Lepidoptera
- Superfamily: Noctuoidea
- Family: Noctuidae
- Genus: Callopistria
- Species: C. nigrescens

Binomial name
- Callopistria nigrescens (Wileman, 1915)

Synonyms
- Bryophila nigrescens Wileman, 1915

= Callopistria nigrescens =

Species of moth

Callopistria nigrescens is a moth of the family Noctuidae. It is found in China and Taiwan.

The wingspan is 29–31 mm for males and 28–29 mm for females.
