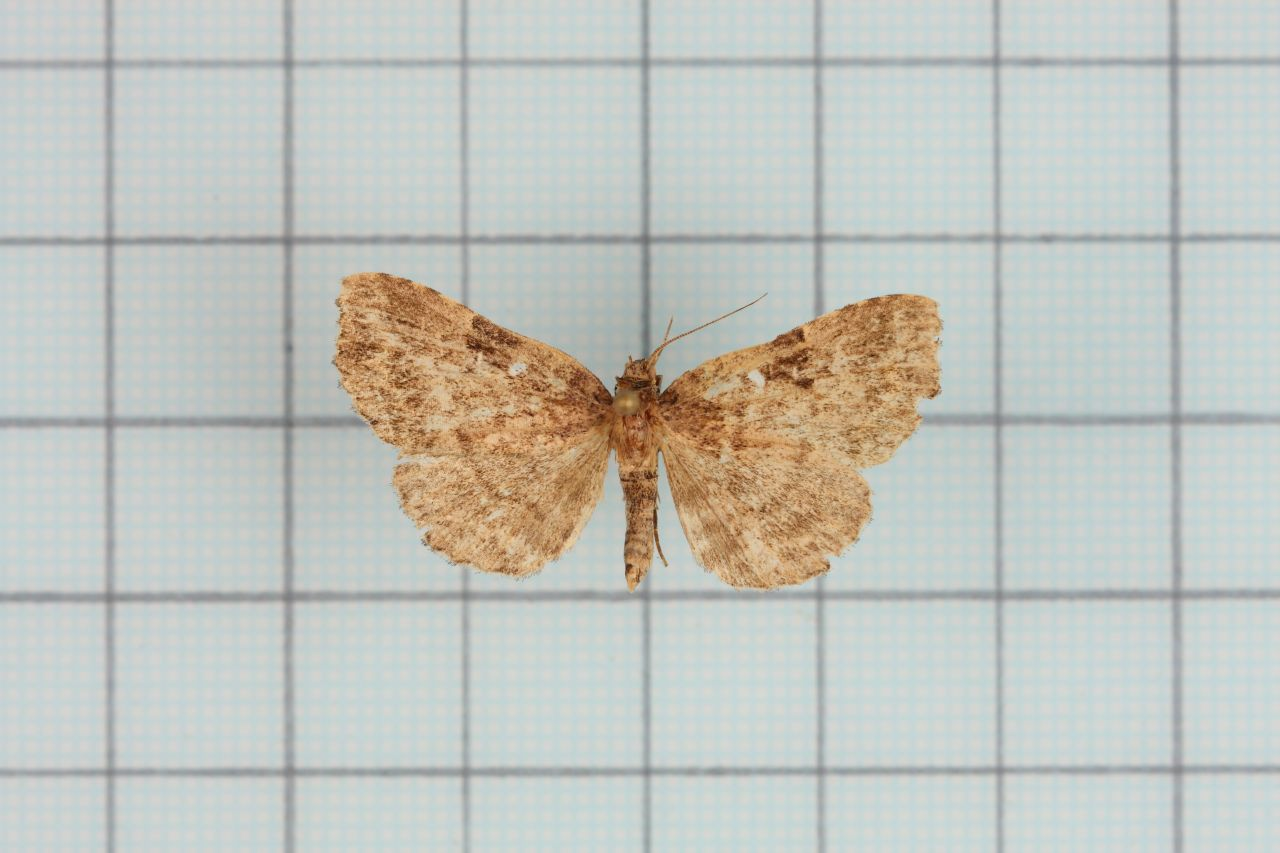

Scientific classification
- Domain: Eukaryota
- Kingdom: Animalia
- Phylum: Arthropoda
- Class: Insecta
- Order: Lepidoptera
- Superfamily: Noctuoidea
- Family: Noctuidae
- Genus: Callopistria
- Species: C. deflexusa

Binomial name
- Callopistria deflexusa Chang, 1991

= Callopistria deflexusa =

Species of moth

Callopistria deflexusa is a moth of the family Noctuidae. It is found in Taiwan.
