= Callopistria thalpophiloides =

Scientific classification
- Kingdom: Animalia
- Phylum: Arthropoda
- Clade: Pancrustacea
- Class: Insecta
- Order: Lepidoptera
- Superfamily: Noctuoidea
- Family: Noctuidae
- Genus: Callopistria
- Species: C. thalpophiloides

Binomial name
- Callopistria thalpophiloides (Walker, 1862)

Synonyms
- Data thalpophiloides Walker, 1862; Thalpophila cuprea Moore, 1877; Thalpophila delineata Moore, 1884; Data thalpophiloides major Warren, 1913

Species of moth

Callopistria thalpophiloides is a moth of the family Noctuidae first described by Francis Walker in 1862. It is found in the Indian subregion, Sri Lanka, Sundaland, China, Taiwan, Philippines, Sulawesi and New Guinea.

The wingspan of the male is 35–37 mm and the female is 33–35 mm. Antennae filiform (thread like). Forewings rich dark brown. Hindwings similar but with dull yellow basal part. Submarginal white flecks anteriorly placed. White medial spot found in between reniform stigma and postmedial line. Abdomen yellowish.
