= Callopistria apicalis =

Scientific classification
- Kingdom: Animalia
- Phylum: Arthropoda
- Clade: Pancrustacea
- Class: Insecta
- Order: Lepidoptera
- Superfamily: Noctuoidea
- Family: Noctuidae
- Genus: Callopistria
- Species: C. apicalis

Binomial name
- Callopistria apicalis (Walker, 1855)

Synonyms
- Mosara apicalis Walker, 1855; Plusia inaperta Walker, [1863]; Anophia lateralis Walker, 1865

Species of moth

Callopistria apicalis is a moth of the family Noctuidae first described by Francis Walker in 1855. It is found in the Indian subregion, Sri Lanka, Sundaland and the Philippines.

The male has strongly bipectinate (comb like on both sides) antennae. Forewings dark, dull brown with obscure markings. There is a row of irregular, black, sagittate (arrowhead-shaped) marks. The basal part of the forewing is darker. Reniform distally paler. Hindwings dull brown with pale brown or whitish basal area.
