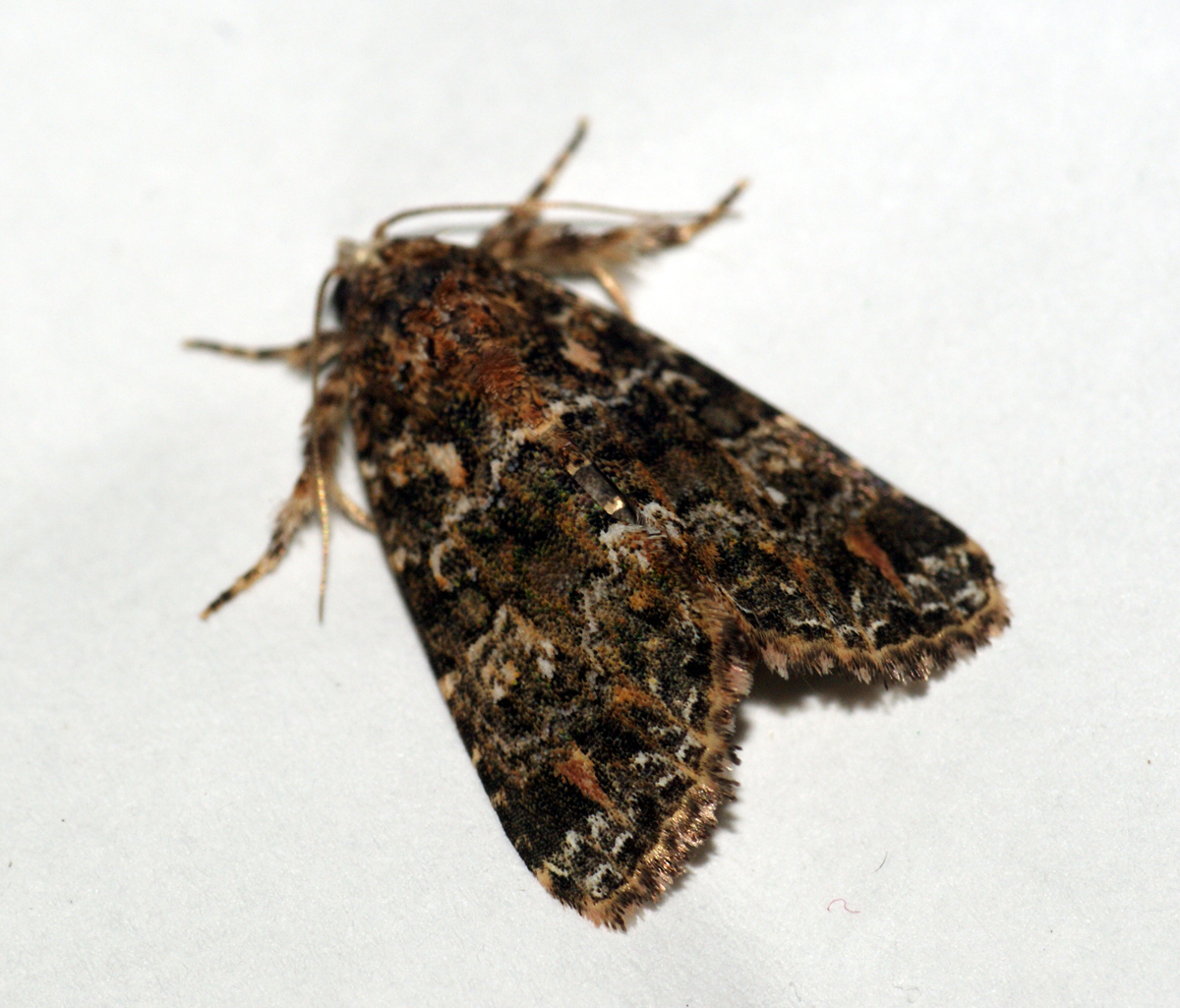

Scientific classification
- Domain: Eukaryota
- Kingdom: Animalia
- Phylum: Arthropoda
- Class: Insecta
- Order: Lepidoptera
- Superfamily: Noctuoidea
- Family: Noctuidae
- Genus: Callopistria
- Species: C. latreillei

Binomial name
- Callopistria latreillei (Duponchel, 1827)

Synonyms
- Noctua latreillei Duponchel, 1827; Callopistria latreillei rakoto Viette, 1965; Callopistria rechingeri (Koutsaftikis, 1973); Erastria roseitelum Walker, 1858

= Callopistria latreillei =

Latreille's Latin

Species of moth

Callopistria latreillei, Latreille's Latin, is a moth of the family Noctuidae. The species can be found in the Palearctic realm, most parts of Europe, Asia, and in Africa from Egypt to South Africa. The habitat consists of rocky limestone slopes with deciduous woodland.

== Technical description and variation ==
E. latreillei Dup. (= quieta Tr. nec Hbn., roseitelum Walk.) (44 f). Forewing whitish, suffused with pale and dark grey, and in parts with blackish fuscous; inner and outer lines black edged with white; a prominent white spot before inner line on submedian fold; stigmata dark grey, with interrupted pale outlines; the reniform with a white dot beyond lower outer angle; submarginal line powdery white, interrupted by the olive or pinkish veins, and preceded by a pink wedge-shaped mark on vein 6; a lunulate white line close before termen; fringe olive yellow, chequered with white; hindwing fuscous, paler towards base in the male. Larva redbrown, with a black dorsal triangle broadly edged with yellow on each segment; lateral lines yellowy with a black spot on each segment. The wingspan is about 25 millimetres (0.98 in).

== Biology ==
There are two generations per year with adults on wing from May to October.

The larvae have been recorded feeding on Ceterach officinarum, Cochlearia species and Adiantum capillus-veneris.
