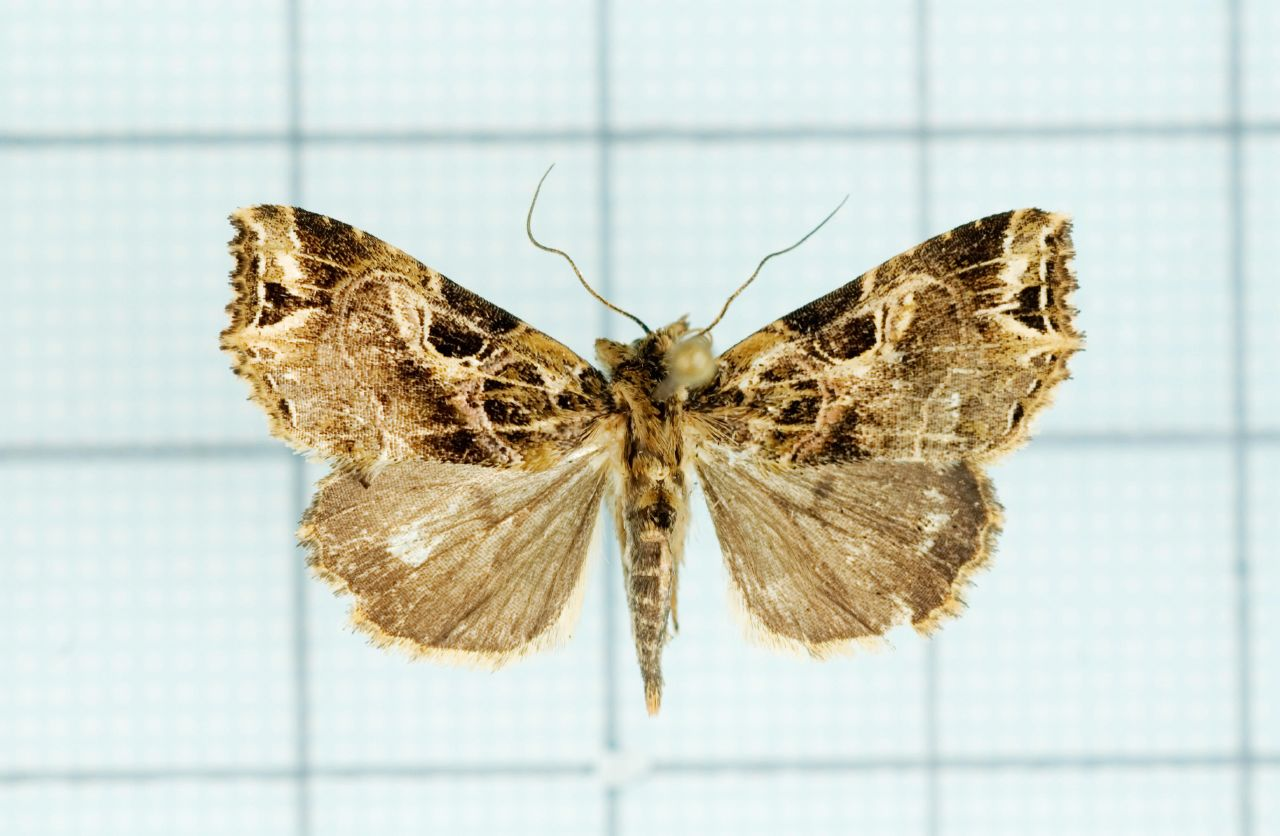

Scientific classification
- Kingdom: Animalia
- Phylum: Arthropoda
- Class: Insecta
- Order: Lepidoptera
- Superfamily: Noctuoidea
- Family: Noctuidae
- Genus: Callopistria
- Species: C. phaeogona

Binomial name
- Callopistria phaeogona (Hampson, 1908)

Synonyms
- Eriopus phaeogona Hampson, 1908; Callopistria pheogona

= Callopistria phaeogona =

Species of moth

Callopistria phaeogona is a moth of the family Noctuidae. It is found in Taiwan.
