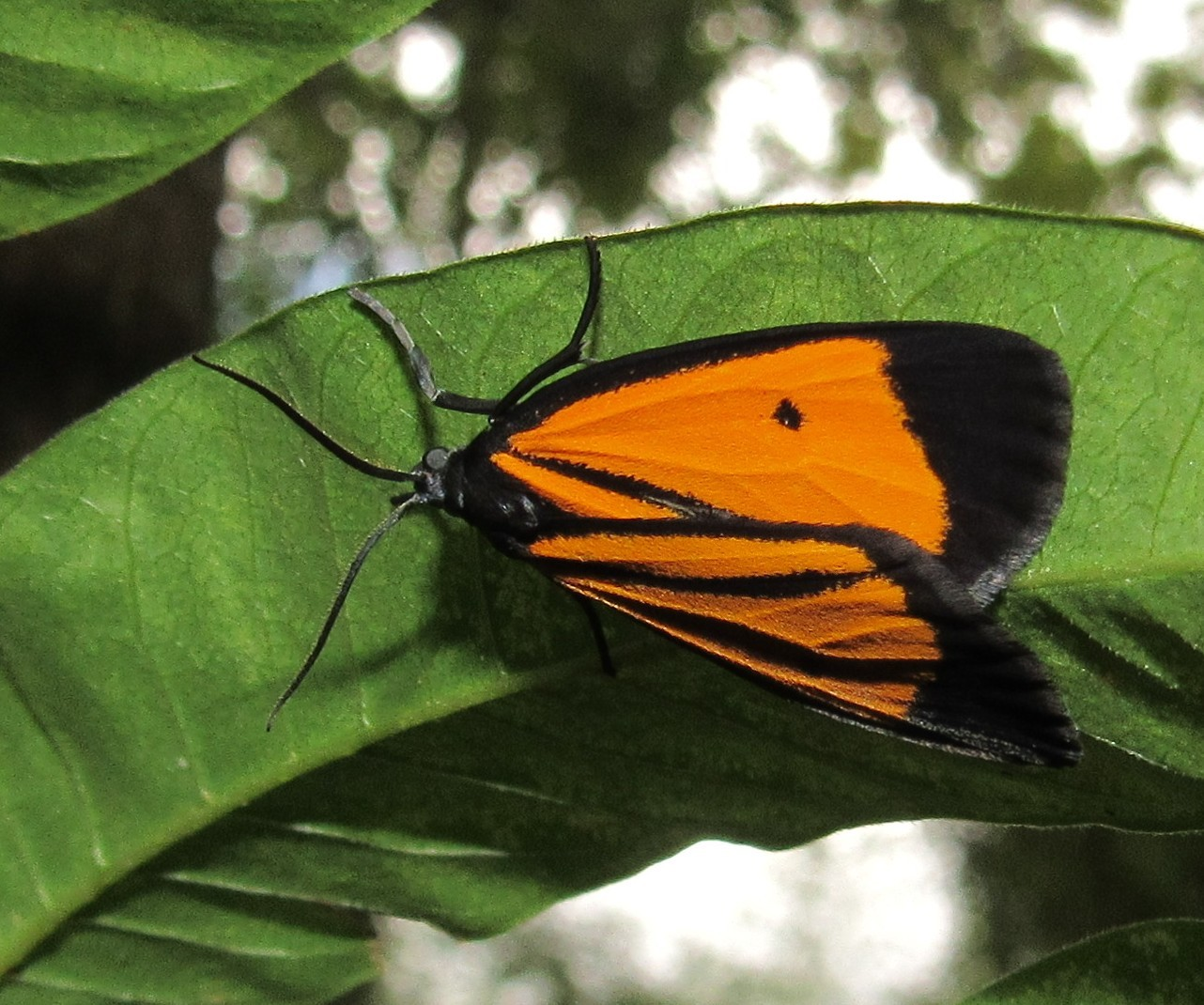
- Paratype univitta, Brazil

Scientific classification
- Kingdom: Animalia
- Phylum: Arthropoda
- Class: Insecta
- Order: Lepidoptera
- Superfamily: Noctuoidea
- Family: Erebidae
- Subfamily: Arctiinae
- Tribe: Lithosiini
- Genus: Paratype
- Species: P. univitta

Binomial name
- Paratype univitta ( Hampson, 1900)

Synonyms
- Euryptidia univitta Hampson, 1900; Paratype discalis Draudt, 1919

= Paratype univitta =

Species of moth

Paratype univitta is a moth in the subfamily Arctiinae. It was described by George Hampson in 1900. It is found in the Brazilian states of Rio de Janeiro, Paraná and Rio Grande do Sul and Goya, Argentina.
