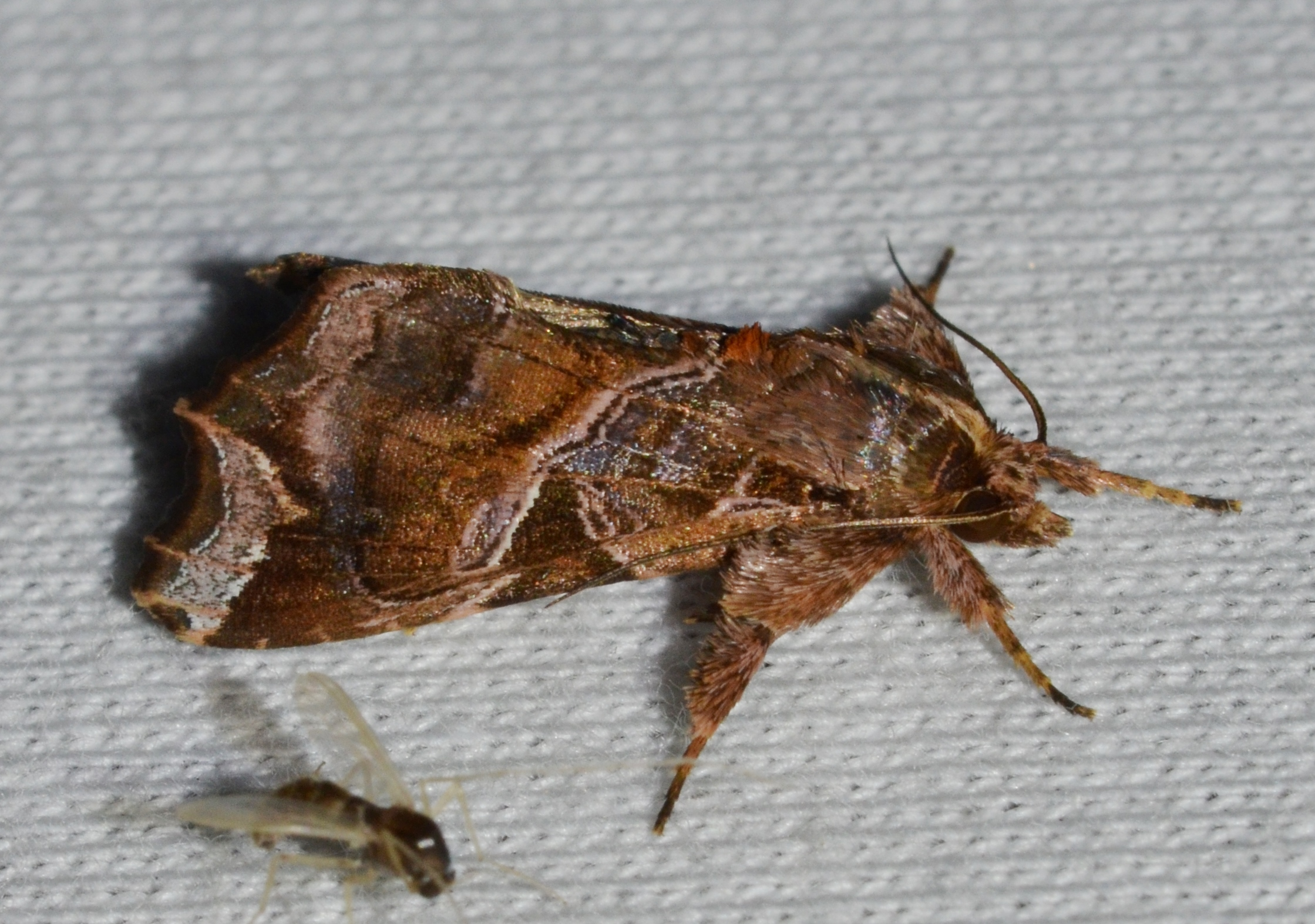

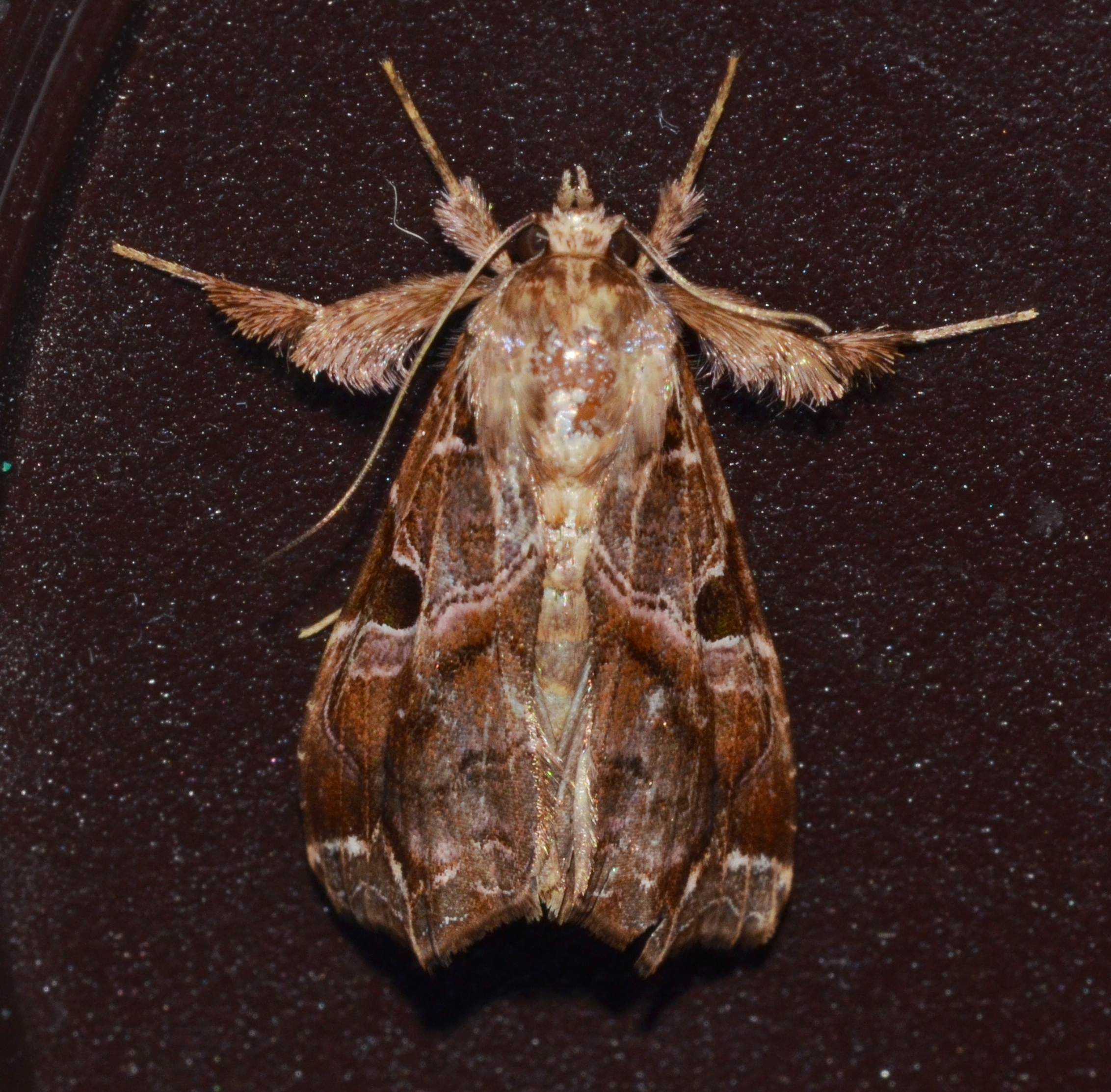

Scientific classification
- Kingdom: Animalia
- Phylum: Arthropoda
- Class: Insecta
- Order: Lepidoptera
- Superfamily: Noctuoidea
- Family: Noctuidae
- Genus: Callopistria
- Species: C. floridensis

Binomial name
- Callopistria floridensis (Guenée, 1852)

Synonyms
- Eriopus elegantulus Herrich-Schäffer, 1868; Callopistria elegantula; Callopistria strena Grote, 1895

= Callopistria floridensis =

Species of moth

Callopistria floridensis, the Florida fern moth or Florida fern caterpillar, is a moth of the family Noctuidae. It is found in North America (including Alabama, California, Florida, Georgia, Iowa, Louisiana, New Brunswick, New Mexico, North Carolina, Ohio, Oklahoma, Ontario, Pennsylvania, South Carolina, Tennessee and Texas), south through the Caribbean (including Cuba), Mexico and Central America (including Costa Rica) to Ecuador.

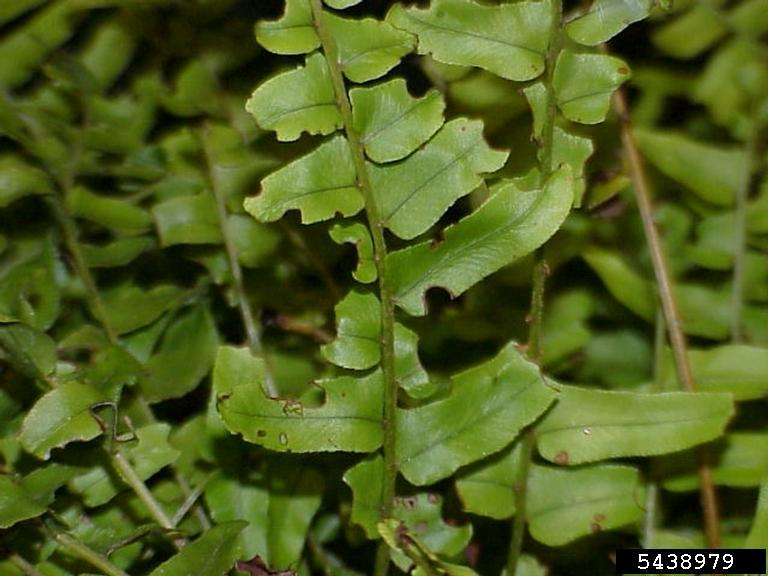
Damage

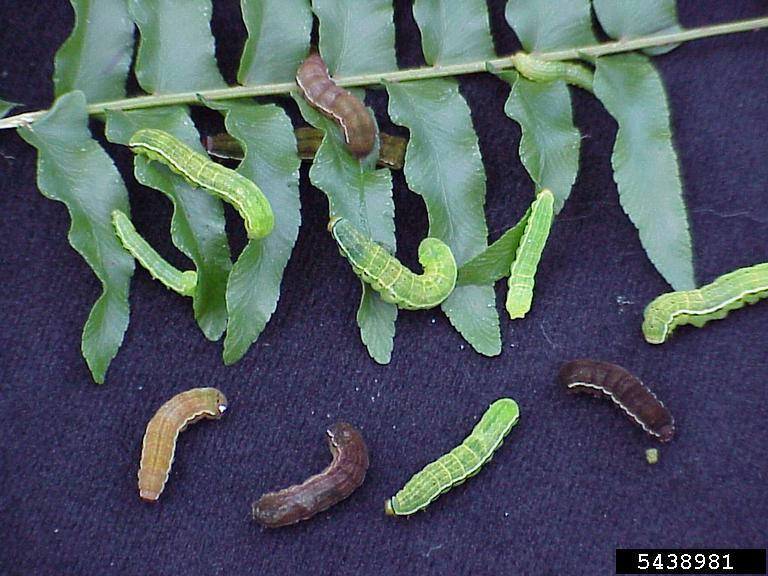
Larvae

The wingspan is about 29 mm (1.1 in). Adults are on wing year round in Florida and the tropics.

The larvae feed on various ferns, including Nephrolepis exaltata and Pteris vittata. It is an occasional pest in greenhouses. The larvae were recently discovered to have high levels of arsenic when feeding on P. vittata, and are the only known terrestrial animal to accumulate arsenic.
