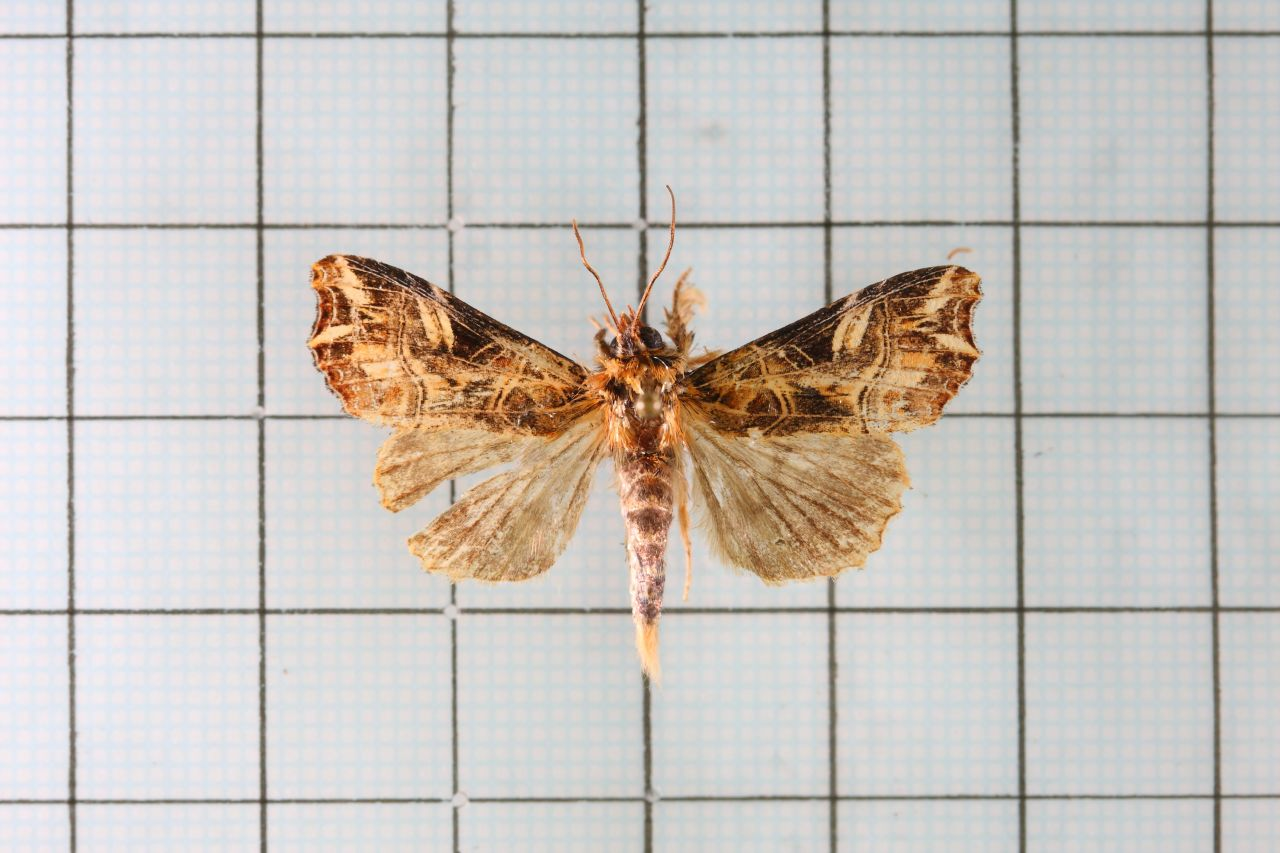

Scientific classification
- Kingdom: Animalia
- Phylum: Arthropoda
- Class: Insecta
- Order: Lepidoptera
- Superfamily: Noctuoidea
- Family: Noctuidae
- Genus: Callopistria
- Species: C. repleta

Binomial name
- Callopistria repleta Walker, [1858]

Synonyms
- Eriopus repleta postpallida Prout, 1928

= Callopistria repleta =

Species of moth

Callopistria repleta is a moth of the family Noctuidae. It is found in India, China, Taiwan, Japan, Peninsular Malaysia, Sumatra and Borneo.

== Subspecies ==
- Callopistria repleta repleta
- Callopistria repleta postpallida Prout, 1928 (Sundaland)
