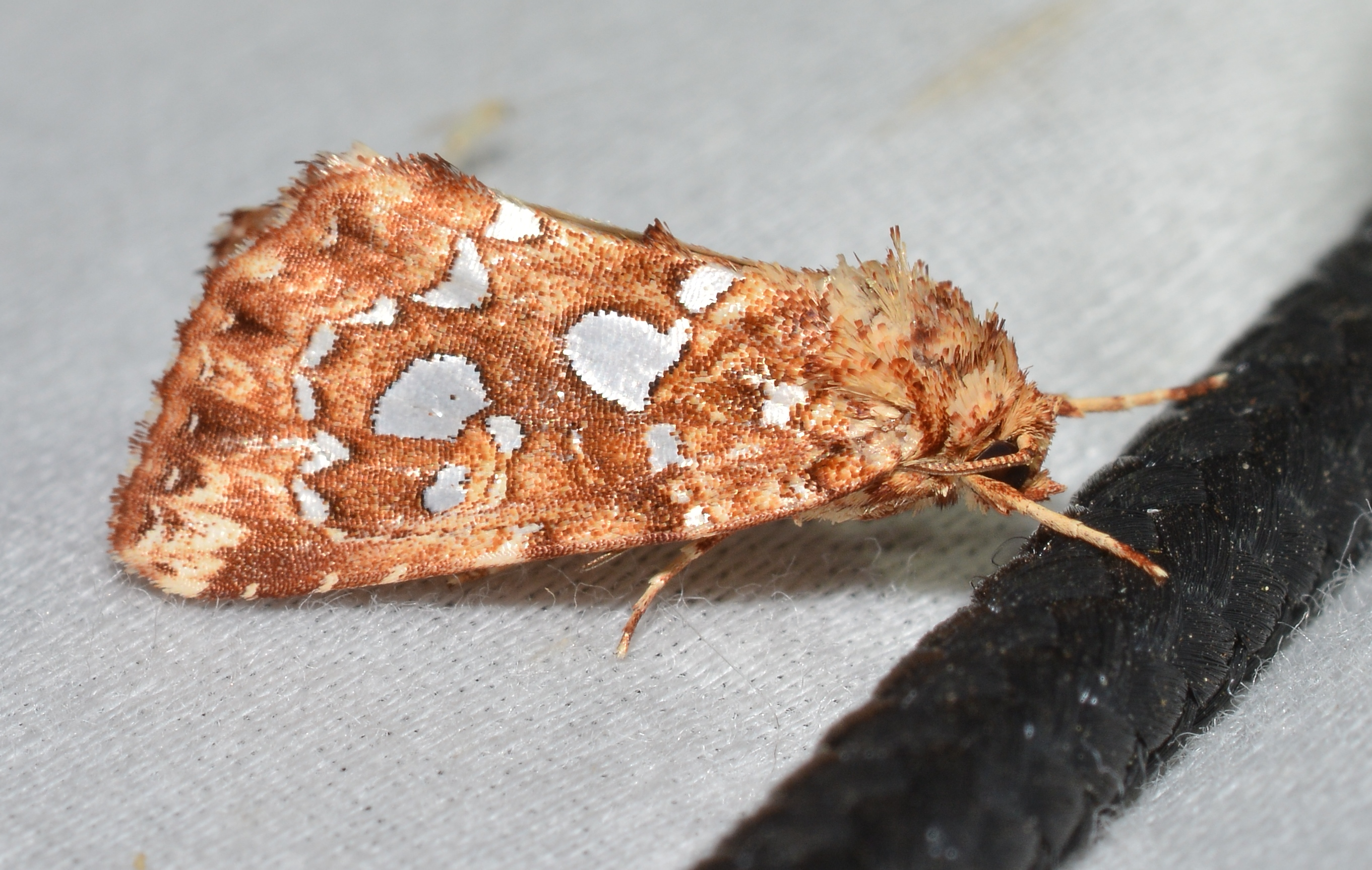

Scientific classification
- Domain: Eukaryota
- Kingdom: Animalia
- Phylum: Arthropoda
- Class: Insecta
- Order: Lepidoptera
- Superfamily: Noctuoidea
- Family: Noctuidae
- Genus: Callopistria
- Species: C. cordata

Binomial name
- Callopistria cordata (Ljungh, 1825)

Synonyms
- Euherrichia monetifera (Guenée, 1852)

= Callopistria cordata =

Species of moth

Callopistria cordata, the silver-spotted fern moth, is a species of moth in the family Noctuidae (the owlet moths). It is found in North America.

The MONA or Hodges number for Callopistria cordata is 9633.
