= Callopistria argyrosemastis =

Scientific classification
- Kingdom: Animalia
- Phylum: Arthropoda
- Class: Insecta
- Order: Lepidoptera
- Superfamily: Noctuoidea
- Family: Noctuidae
- Genus: Callopistria
- Species: C. argyrosemastis

Binomial name
- Callopistria argyrosemastis (Hampson, 1918)

Synonyms
- Eriopus argyrosemastis Hampson, 1918

Species of moth

Callopistria argyrosemastis is a moth of the family Noctuidae. It was described by George Hampson in 1918. It is found on Fiji.
