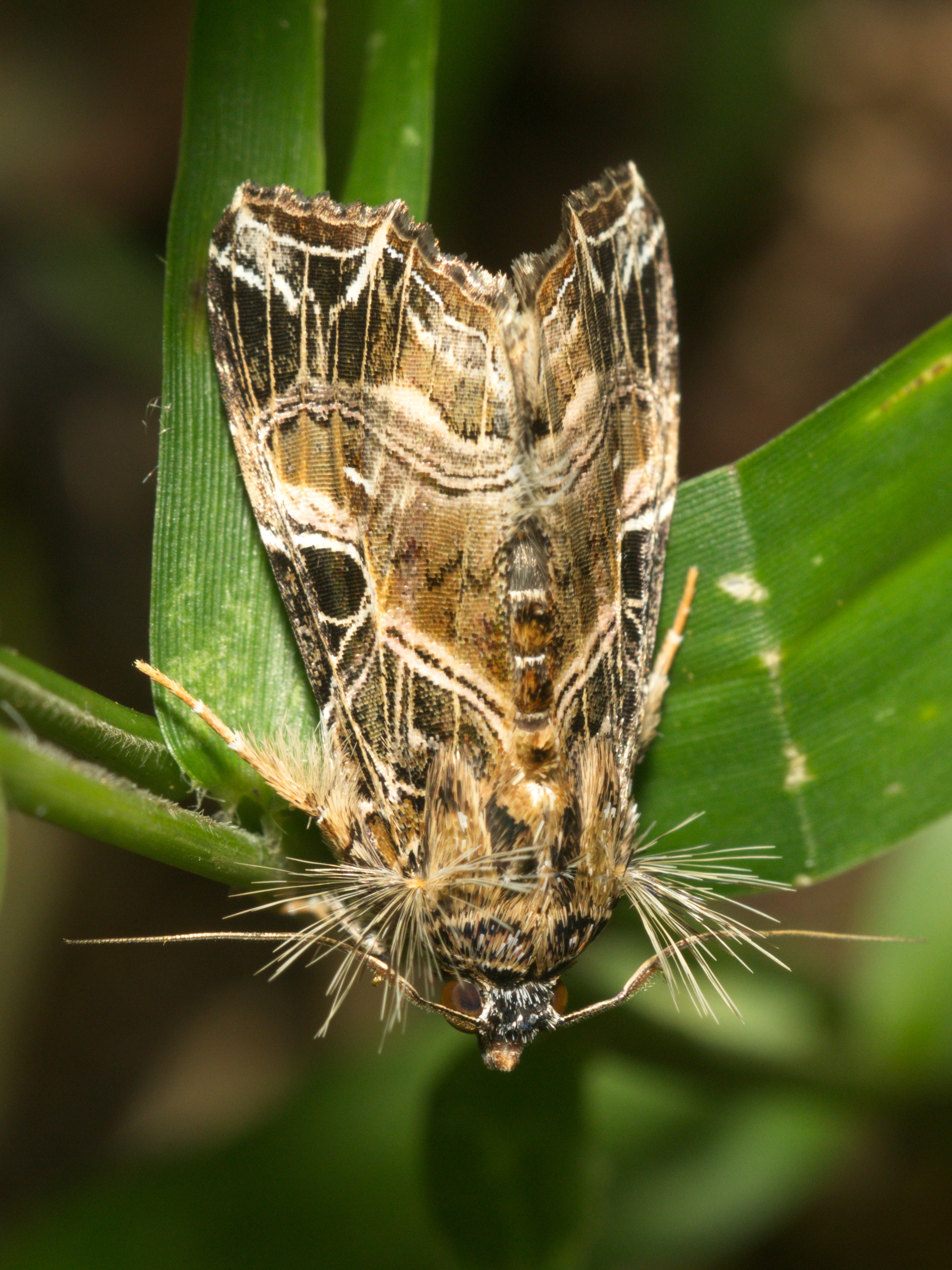
- Callopistria rivularis

Scientific classification
- Kingdom: Animalia
- Phylum: Arthropoda
- Clade: Pancrustacea
- Class: Insecta
- Order: Lepidoptera
- Superfamily: Noctuoidea
- Family: Noctuidae
- Subfamily: Eriopinae
- Genus: Callopistria; Hübner, [1821]

Synonyms
- Lagopus Reichenbach, 1817; Eriopus Treitschke, 1825; Mosara Walker, 1855; Agraga Walker, 1858; Agabra Walker, 1862; Obana Walker, 1862; Eulepa Walker, [1863]; Cotanda Moore, 1881; Methorasa Moore, 1881; Herrichia Grote, 1882; Euherrichia Grote, 1882; Dissolophus Butler, 1891; Gnamptocera Butler, 1891; Haploolophus Butler, 1891; Hemipachycera Butler, 1891; Hyperdasys Butler, 1891; Rhoptrotrichia Butler, 1891; Platydasys Butler, 1892; Miropalpa Berio, 1955

= Callopistria =

Genus of moths

Callopistria is a genus of moths of the family Noctuidae. It was described by Jacob Hübner in 1821.

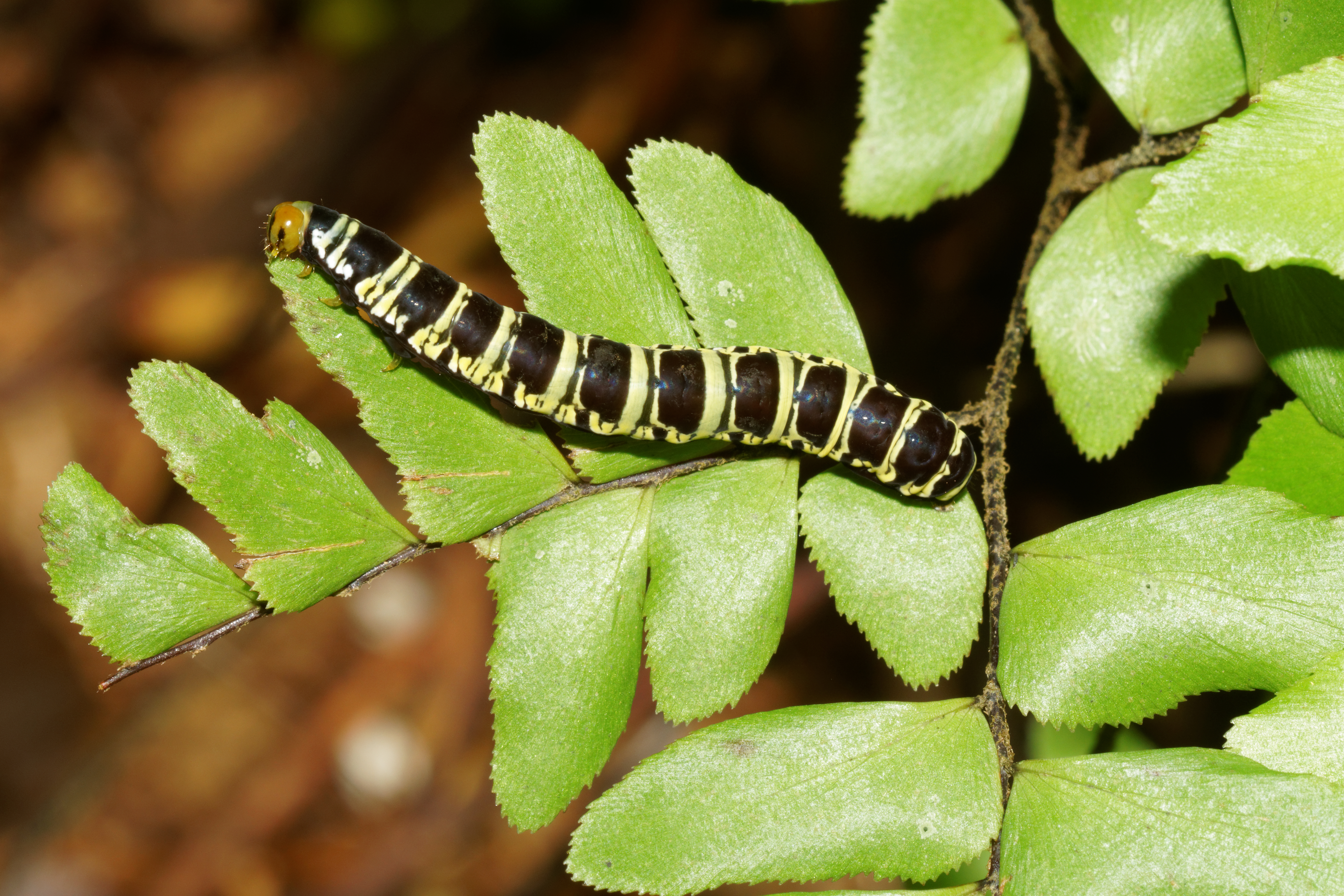
Callopistria larva feeding on Adiantum sp.

== Description ==
Their eyes are naked and without lashes. Its proboscis is well developed. The palpi are short, upturned, obliquely porrect (extending forward), roughly scaled and reaching above vertex of head. Antennae bipectinated (comb like on both sides). Thorax hairy, without tufts. Abdomen with dorsal tufts on the proximal segments. Male with large lateral and anal tufts. Tibia spineless and strongly tufted. Forewings short and broad with non-crenulate (non-scalloped) cilia. Apex rounded, inner margin lobed near base and with a slight tooth of scales at outer angle. Hindwings of male with a ridge and fold on underside running from center of costa to lower angle of cell and then to centre of outer margin.

== Species ==
- Callopistria aetiohiops Butler, 1878 (or Callopistria aethiops)
- Callopistria albipunctalis Holloway, 1989
- Callopistria albistriga (Walker, [1863])
- Callopistria albistrigoides Poole, 1989
- Callopistria albivitta (Hampson, 1918)
- Callopistria albolinea (Graeser. 1889)
- Callopistria albomacula Leech, 1900
- Callopistria alfredi Holloway, 1989
- Callopistria altigutta (Holloway, 1989)
- Callopistria antithetica Wiltshire, 1977
- Callopistria apicalis (Walker, 1855)
- Callopistria argyrosemastis (Hampson, 1918)
- Callopistria argyrosticta (Butler, 1881)
- Callopistria batanga (Draudt, 1930)
- Callopistria benguellae Weymer, 1908
- Callopistria bergeri Berio, 1976
- Callopistria bernei Viette, 1985
- Callopistria cariei (de Joannis, 1915)
- Callopistria chera (A. E. Prout, 1927)
- Callopistria chloriza (Guenée, 1852)
- Callopistria chlorocroa (Hampson, 1908)
- Callopistria clava (Leech, 1900)
- Callopistria coelisigna Hampson, 1902
- Callopistria complicata (Holland, 1894)
- Callopistria concinna (Prout, 1926)
- Callopistria cordata (Ljungh, 1825)
- Callopistria cornuscopiae (Holland, 1894)
- Callopistria cristata Legrand, 1966
- Callopistria cyanopera (Hampson, 1911)
- Callopistria dascia D. S. Fletcher, 1961
- Callopistria deflexusa Chang, 1991
- Callopistria delicata Chang, 1991
- Callopistria duplicans Walker, 1858
- Callopistria emiliusalis (Walker, [1859])
- Callopistria equatorialis Berio, 1970
- Callopistria exotica (Guenée, 1852)
- Callopistria ferruginea (Hampson, 1908)
- Callopistria fimbripes (Walker, 1858)
- Callopistria flabellum Berio, 1976
- Callopistria flavitincta Galsworthy, 1997
- Callopistria floridensis (Guenée, 1852)
- Callopistria fusimacula (Holloway, 1989)
- Callopistria gilvithorax (Prout, 1928)
- Callopistria granitosa (Guenée, 1852)
- Callopistria grassei Laporte, 1970
- Callopistria guttulalis Hampson, 1896
- Callopistria imparata (Walker, 1865)
- Callopistria indica (Butler, 1891)
- Callopistria insularis Butler, 1882
- Callopistria intermissa Saalmüller, 1891
- Callopistria jamaicensis (Möschler, 1886)
- Callopistria japonibia Inoue & Sugi, 1958
- Callopistria javentina (Stoll, 1782)
- Callopistria juventina (Stoll, [1782]) – Latin
- Callopistria latreillei (Duponchel, 1827)
- Callopistria leucobasis (Hampson, 1908)
- Callopistria ludovici (Prout, 1922)
- Callopistria maillardi (Guenée, 1862)
- Callopistria malagasy Viette, 1965
- Callopistria matilei Viette, 1979
- Callopistria microptera (Hampson, 1908)
- Callopistria minuata Butler, 1889
- Callopistria miranda (Saalmüller, 1880)
- Callopistria mollissima (Guenée, 1852)
- Callopistria montana Holloway, 1976
- Callopistria nana (Hampson, 1911)
- Callopistria natalensis (Hampson, 1908)
- Callopistria nigrescens (Wileman, 1915)
- Callopistria niveigutta (Walker, [1863])
- Callopistria nobilior Eda, 2000
- Callopistria pauliani Berio, 1955
- Callopistria pheogona Hampson, 1908 (or Callopistria phaeogona)
- Callopistria placodoides (Guenée, 1852)
- Callopistria promiscua Saalmüller, 1891
- Callopistria pulchrilinea (Walker, 1862)
- Callopistria quadralba (Draudt, 1950)
- Callopistria quadrinotata (Walker, [1863])
- Callopistria randimbyi Viette, 1965
- Callopistria rectilinea Saalmüller, 1891
- Callopistria repleta Walker, [1858]
- Callopistria renivitta Berio, 1966
- Callopistria rufulus (Rothschild, 1924)
- Callopistria rivularis Walker, [1858]
- Callopistria scriptiplena (Walker, 1862)
- Callopistria sogai Viette, 1965
- Callopistria subroseata Berio, 1966
- Callopistria tarsipilosa Berio, 1959
- Callopistria thalpophiloides (Walker, 1862)
- Callopistria thermochroa (Hampson, 1911)
- Callopistria trilineata (Walker, 1862)
- Callopistria unica Laporte, 1973
- Callopistria venata Leech, 1900
- Callopistria ventralis Walker, [1863]
- Callopistria violascens (Rothschild, 1924)
- Callopistria wallacei (Felder, 1874)
- Callopistria xerysta Viette, 1976
- Callopistria yerburii (Butler, 1884)
