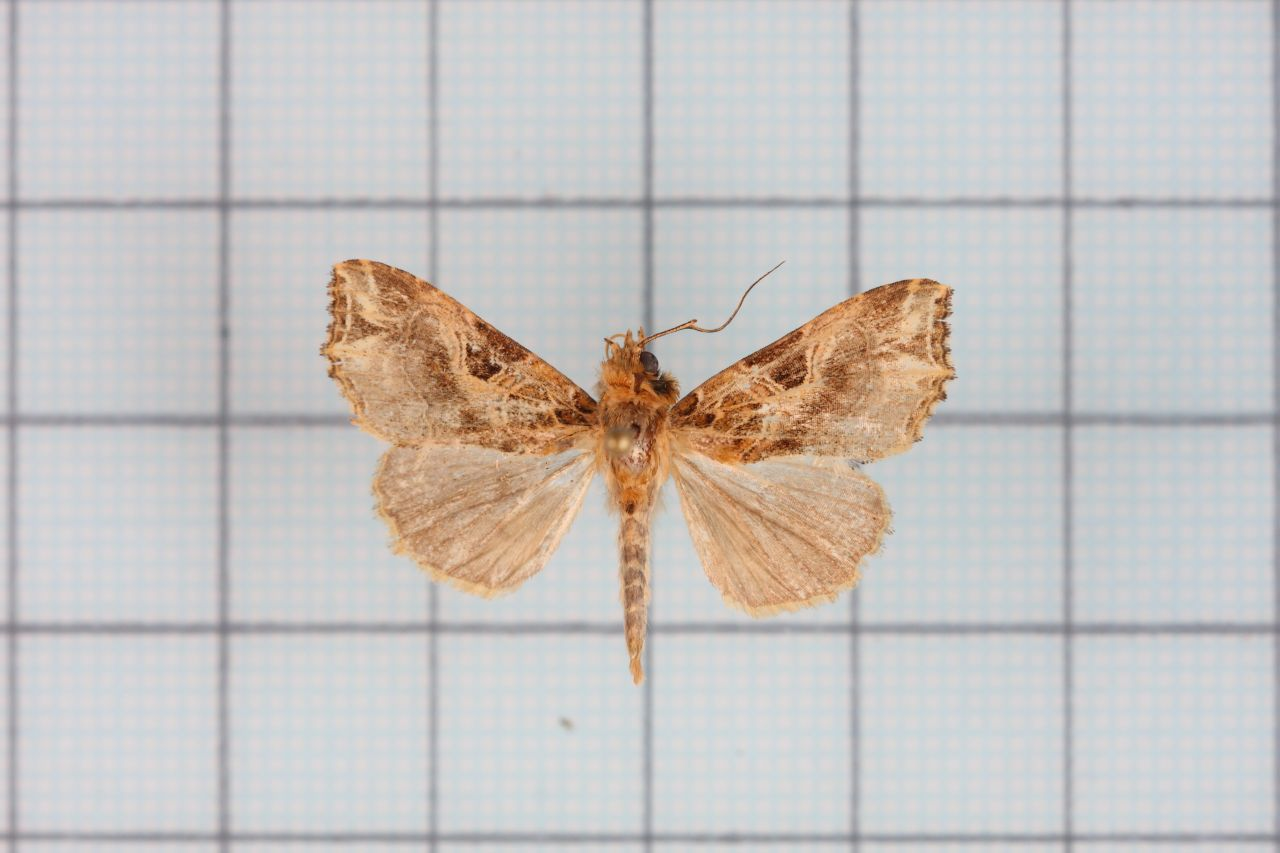

Scientific classification
- Kingdom: Animalia
- Phylum: Arthropoda
- Class: Insecta
- Order: Lepidoptera
- Superfamily: Noctuoidea
- Family: Noctuidae
- Genus: Callopistria
- Species: C. duplicans

Binomial name
- Callopistria duplicans Walker, 1858

Synonyms
- Callopistria rubrirena (Warren, 1911)

= Callopistria duplicans =

Species of moth

Callopistria duplicans is a moth of the family Noctuidae. It is found in Japan, Korea, China and Taiwan.

The wingspan is about 28 mm.
