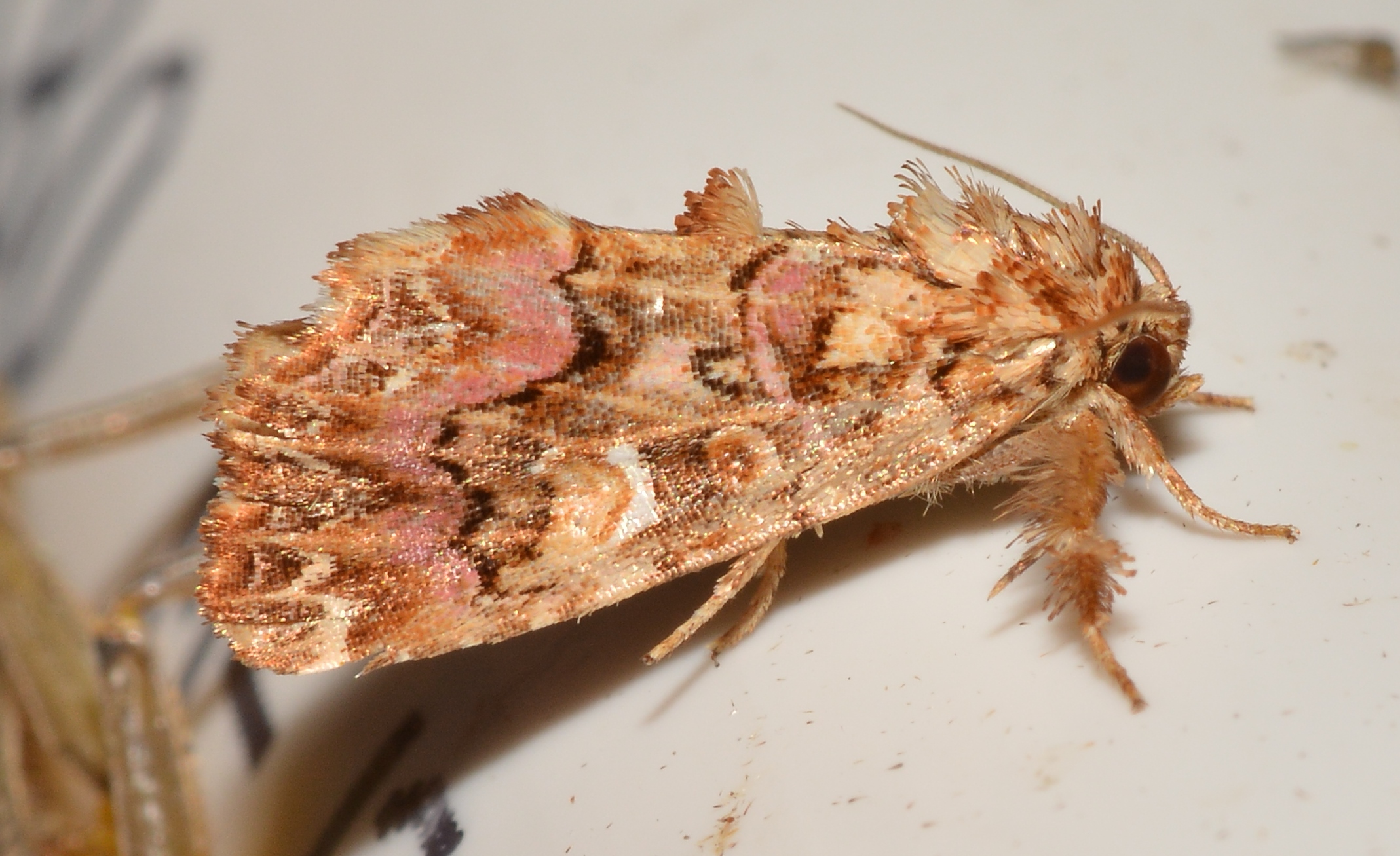

Scientific classification
- Kingdom: Animalia
- Phylum: Arthropoda
- Clade: Pancrustacea
- Class: Insecta
- Order: Lepidoptera
- Superfamily: Noctuoidea
- Family: Noctuidae
- Genus: Callopistria
- Species: C. mollissima

Binomial name
- Callopistria mollissima (Guenée, 1852)

= Callopistria mollissima =

Species of moth

Callopistria mollissima, the pink-shaded fern moth, is a species of moth in the family Noctuidae (the owlet moths).
