= Callopistria jamaicensis =

Scientific classification
- Domain: Eukaryota
- Kingdom: Animalia
- Phylum: Arthropoda
- Class: Insecta
- Order: Lepidoptera
- Superfamily: Noctuoidea
- Family: Noctuidae
- Genus: Callopistria
- Species: C. jamaicensis

Binomial name
- Callopistria jamaicensis (Möschler, 1886)

Species of moth

Callopistria jamaicensis is a species of moth in the family Noctuidae (the owlet moths). It is found in North America.

The MONA or Hodges number for Callopistria jamaicensis is 9630.1.
