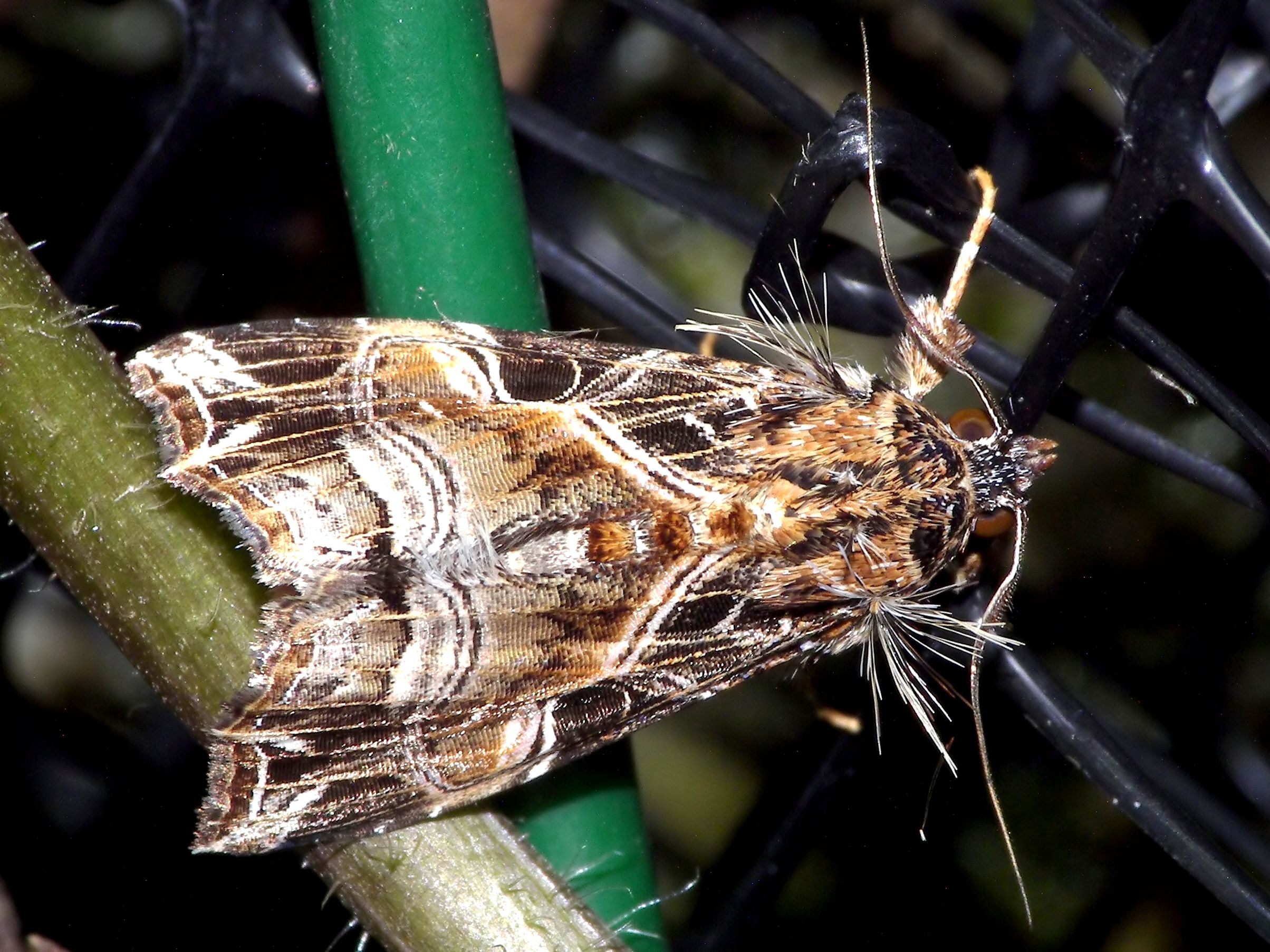

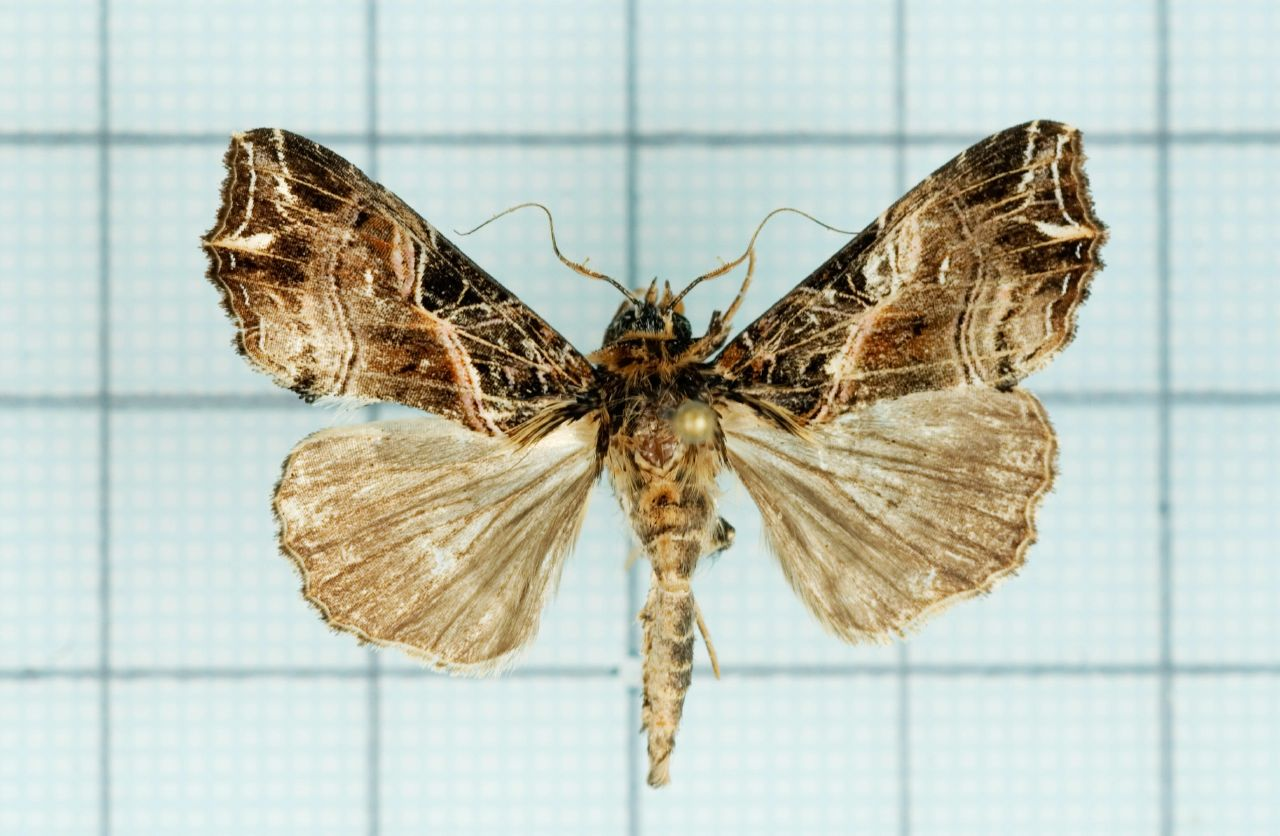

Scientific classification
- Kingdom: Animalia
- Phylum: Arthropoda
- Clade: Pancrustacea
- Class: Insecta
- Order: Lepidoptera
- Superfamily: Noctuoidea
- Family: Noctuidae
- Genus: Callopistria
- Species: C. maillardi

Binomial name
- Callopistria maillardi Guenée, 1862

Synonyms
- Callopistria nauticorum Tams, 1935; Eriopus recurvata Moore, 1882; Callopistria pseudintermissa Viette, 1965

= Callopistria maillardi =

Species of moth

Callopistria maillardi is a moth of the family Noctuidae. The species can be found throughout central, eastern and southern Africa, including the islands of the Indian Ocean, Yemen, Chagos Archipelago, Pakistan, India, Sri Lanka, southern China, in Hawaii, Hong Kong, New Zealand, the Society Islands, Sulawesi, as well as Queensland in Australia.

== Description ==
Its wingspan is about 40 mm. Antennae of male with three spatulate hairs on the curved portion. Legs very densely clothed with long hair. Head and thorax clothed with dark ferrugineous and white hair. Abdomen paler with ferrous colored dorsal tufts. Forewings more varied with reddish. The veins and lines reddish. Antemedial line more angulated. There is a medial crenulate black line. Ventral side of hindwings with more crenulated postmedial line.

== Ecology ==
The larvae feed on Adiantum, Lygodium, Pellaea, Nephrolepis biserrata, and Asplenium nidus.
