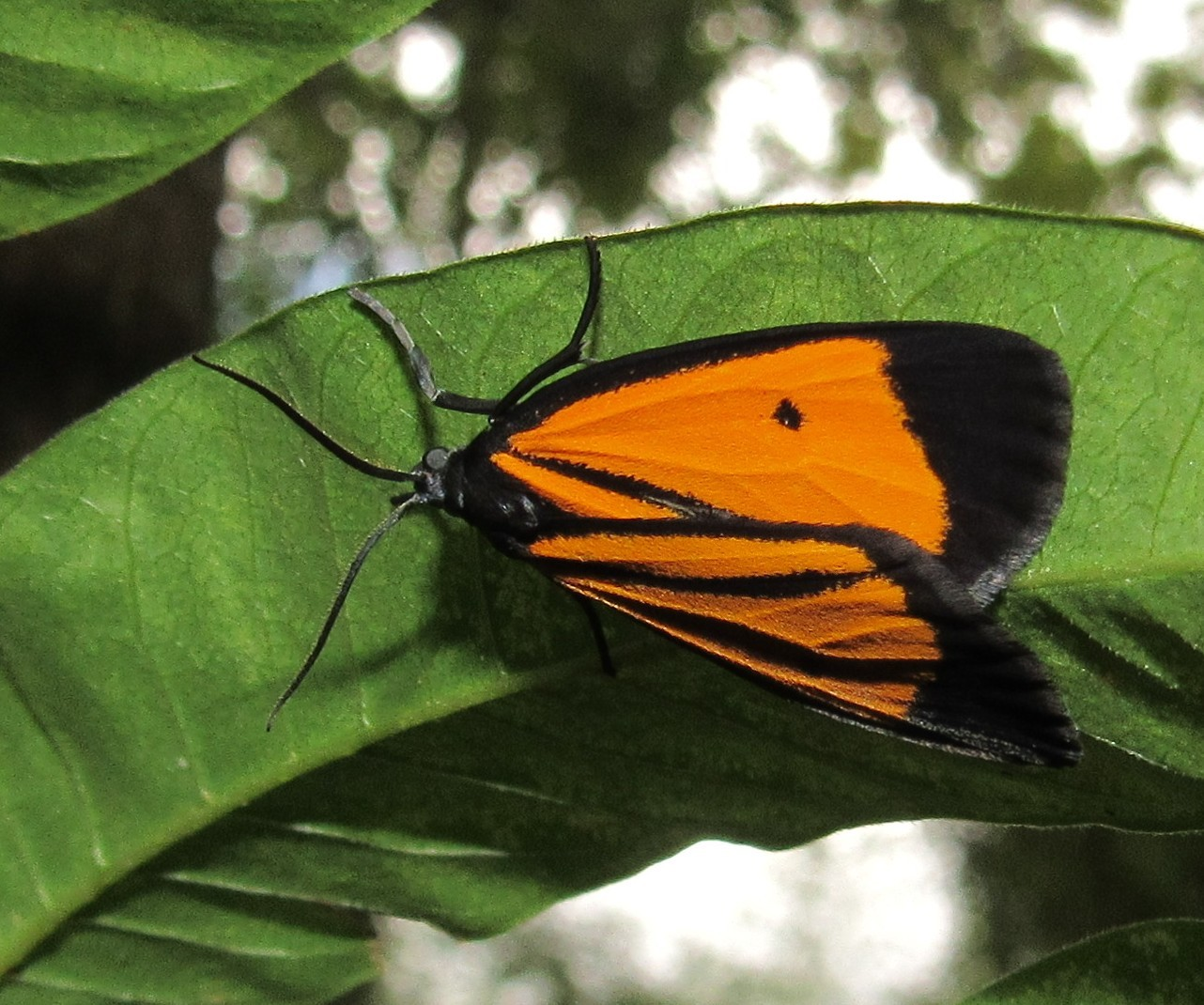
- Paratype univitta, Brazil

Scientific classification
- Domain: Eukaryota
- Kingdom: Animalia
- Phylum: Arthropoda
- Class: Insecta
- Order: Lepidoptera
- Superfamily: Noctuoidea
- Family: Erebidae
- Subfamily: Arctiinae
- Tribe: Lithosiini
- Genus: Paratype; Felder, 1874

Synonyms
- Euryptidia Hampson, 1900

= Paratype (moth) =

Genus of moths

Paratype is a genus of moths in the subfamily Arctiinae first described by Felder in 1874. They are found in the Neotropics.

== Species ==
- Paratype basivitta Walker, 1854
- Paratype ira Druce, 1889
- Paratype nigra Reich, 1936
- Paratype trifera Walker, 1869
- Paratype univitta Hampson, 1900
