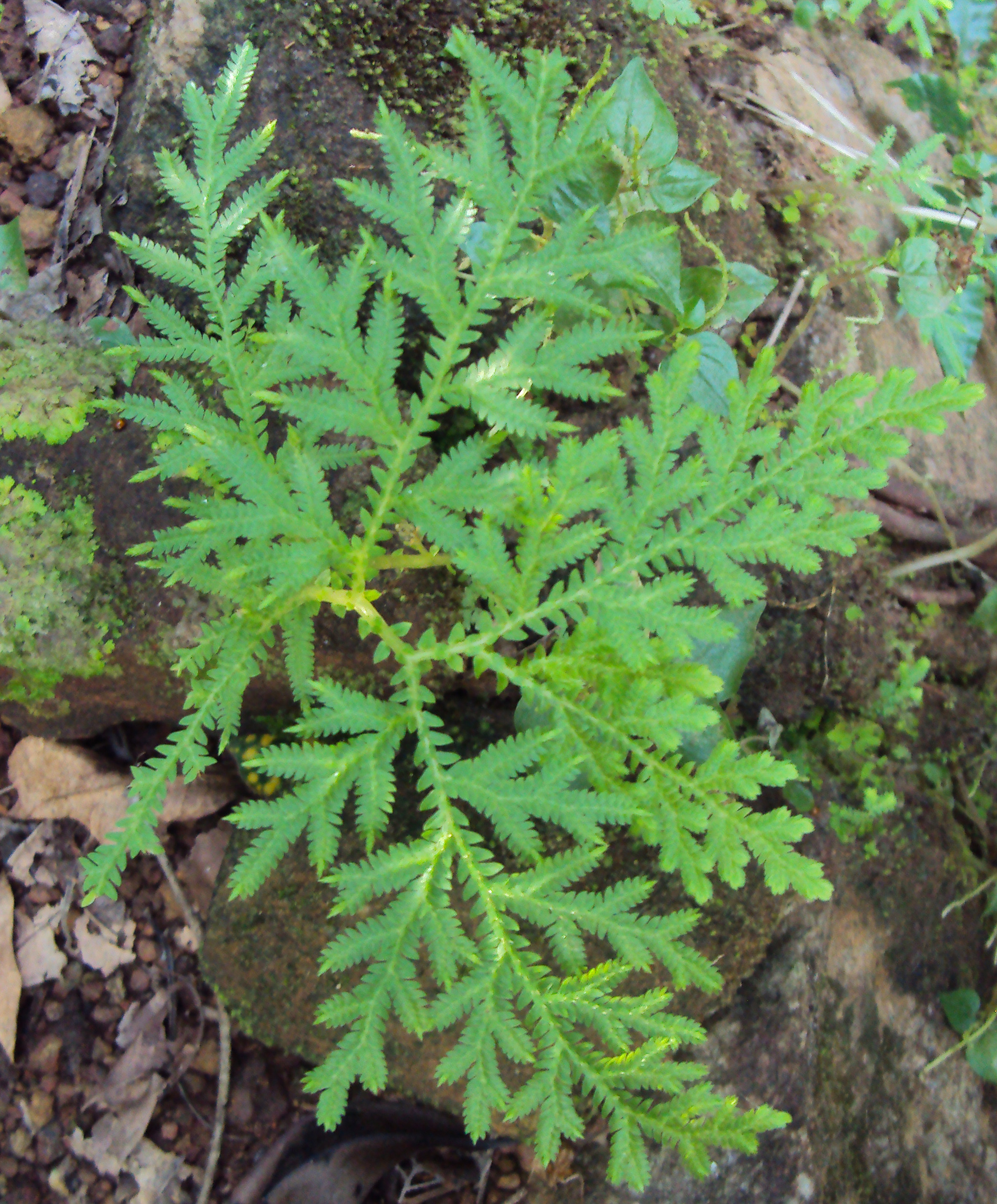

Scientific classification
- Kingdom: Plantae
- Clade: Tracheophytes
- Clade: Lycophytes
- Class: Lycopodiopsida
- Order: Selaginellales
- Family: Selaginellaceae
- Genus: Selaginella
- Species: S. delicatula

Binomial name
- Selaginella delicatula (Desv.) Alston

= Selaginella delicatula =

Species of plant

Selaginella delicatula is a species of spikemoss that is native to the wet tropical and subtropical regions of Asia. It was first described in 1932 by Alston. As an epiphyte, it grows on other plants and thrives in a diverse range of countries including India, China, and Vietnam. The species is widely accepted and found throughout its native range.
