= Primary cutaneous coccidioidomycosis =

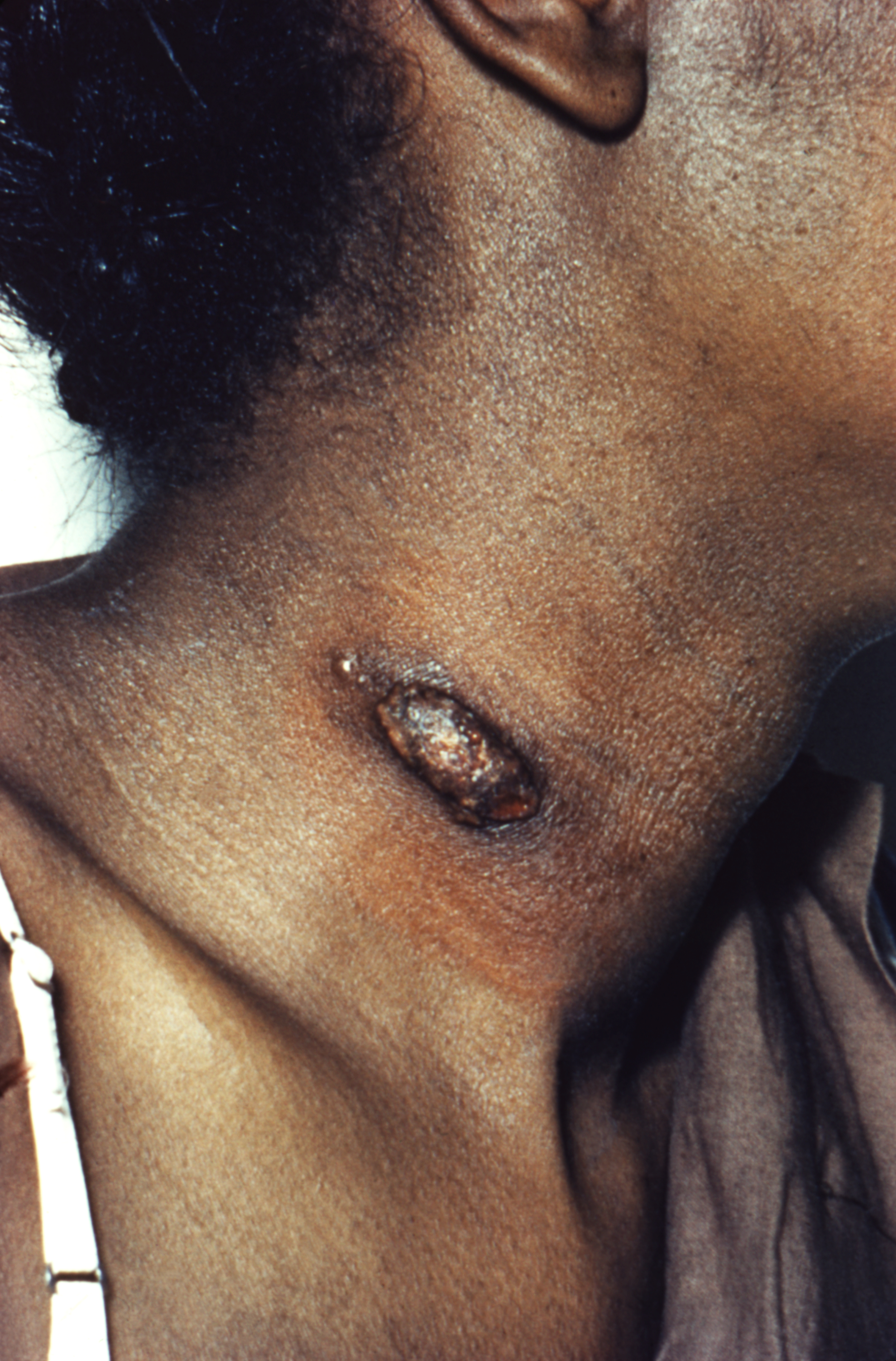
- The right side of this patient’s neck displayed a chronic lesion that had been determined to be due to a Coccidioides.
- Specialty: Dermatology

Primary cutaneous coccidioidomycosis is a skin condition caused by Coccidioides immitis following a definite history of inoculation or a colonized splinter found in the skin lesion.

== See also ==
- Coccidioidomycosis
- List of cutaneous conditions
