= Myrnie Gifford =

American medical physician

Myrnie Ade Gifford
- fair use image
- Born: 1892
- Died: 1966 (aged 73–74)
- Education: University of California, Berkeley; Stanford University; Mount Holyoke College
- Known for: Coccidioidomycosis identification
- Scientific career
- Workplaces: San Francisco General Hospital

Myrnie Ade Gifford (1892–1966) was an American medical physician. She was the first to identify that San Joaquin Valley Fever was the primary stage of coccidioidomycosis.

== Early life and education ==
Gifford was born to Charles Clinton and Augusta Leona Gifford in National City, California. She completed her bachelor's degree at Mount Holyoke College and graduated in 1915. She attended Stanford University to study medicine and earned her medical degree in 1920. She moved to the University of California, Berkeley for her doctoral studies. Gifford was an intern and house officer at San Francisco General Hospital. She completed a Certificate in Public Health at Johns Hopkins University in 1934.

== Career ==
Gifford was the first doctor to investigate a Californian disease called San Joaquin Valley Fever; a disease that cause joint pain and erythema multiforme. Coccidioidomycosis was first identified by an Argentinian medical student, Alejandro Posadas, in 1892, the year Gifford that was born. It was once considered to be lethal and rare, but was shown by Gifford to be frequent and manageable. She was an Assistant Health Officer for Kern County, California from 1934. Whilst there, she reported that valley fever patients developed a skin sensitivity (erythema nodosum) when injected with a coccidioides antigen.

She began to conduct skin tests on all patients who had valley fever; and found that whilst some were symptomless, they were all positive for coccidioidomycosis. Gifford was the first person to recognise that desert fever and valley fever were caused by the coccidioides fungus. This work received national recognition. She was the first to demonstrate that valley fever were the primary stages of the coccidioidomycosis infection. In 1938, Gifford joined E. C. Dickson to explain that the infection resembles primary tuberculosis and a full clinical recovery is possible. She continued to work on coccidioidomycosis and found that it occurred more often in men than in women and people of ethnic minorities. Over 80% of the patients who died had been engaged in agriculture or work where dust could have been involved.

She continued to advocate for migrant communities and found that 25% of the Arvin Federal Labor Camp were positive for valley fever. Gifford retired in 1954 and lived with her sister Myrtle Glifford. She died in 1966. There is a library dedicated to her honor at Kern County Public Health Services Department.
