= Primary pulmonary coccidioidomycosis =

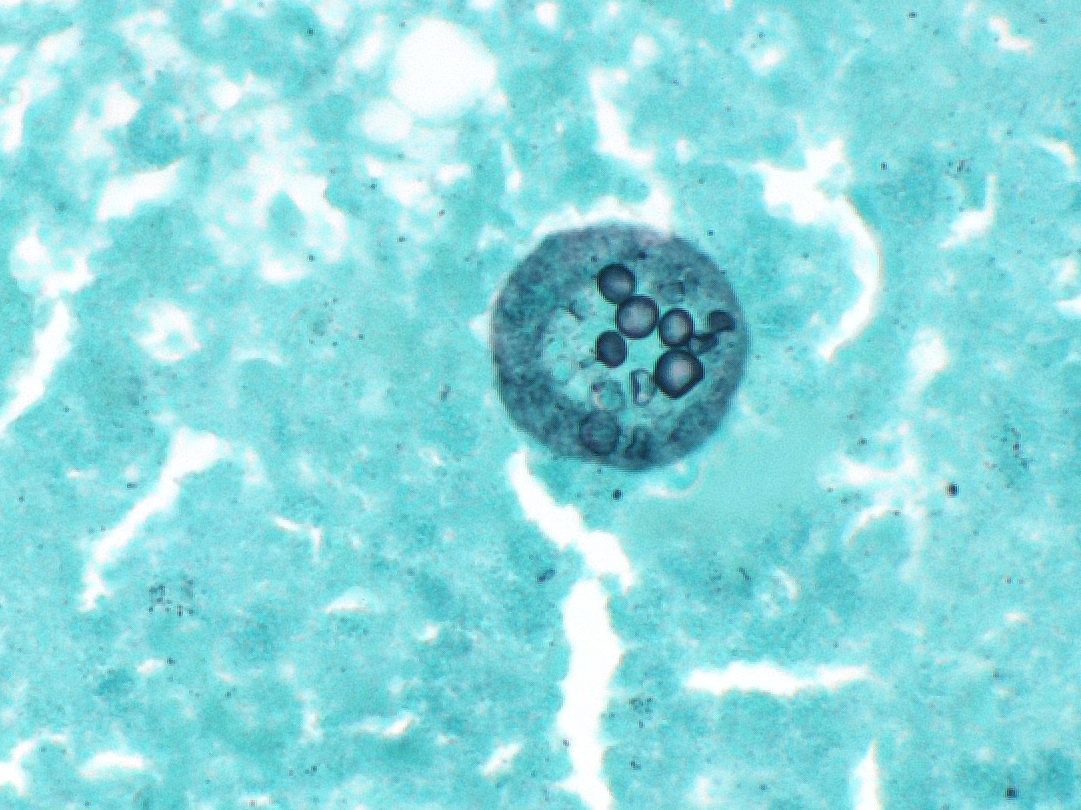
- Coccidioidomycosis in lung, endospores in spherule.
- Specialty: Infectious diseases

Primary pulmonary coccidioidomycosis is a fungal infection caused by inhalation of Coccidioides immitis spores. Once pulmonary symptoms subside, about 30% of women and 15% of men will have immune system-mediated skin manifestations in the form of erythema nodosum. A coccidioidoma is a benign localized residual granulomatous lesion or scar that can remain in the lung's tissues following primary pulmonary coccidioidomycosis.

== See also ==
- Coccidioidomycosis
- List of cutaneous conditions
