= Coccidioides posadasii =

Scientific classification
- Kingdom: Fungi
- Division: Ascomycota
- Class: Eurotiomycetes
- Order: Onygenales
- Family: Onygenaceae
- Genus: Coccidioides
- Species: C. posadasii

Binomial name
- Coccidioides posadasii M.C.Fisher, G.L.Koenig, T.J.White & J.W.Taylor

Species of fungus

Coccidioides posadasii is a pathogenic fungus that, along with Coccidioides immitis, is the causative agent of coccidioidomycosis, or valley fever in humans. It resides in the soil in certain parts of the Southwestern United States, northern Mexico, and some other areas in the Americas, but its evolution was connected to its animal hosts.

Coccidioides posadasii and C. immitis are morphologically identical, but genetically and epidemiologically distinct. C. posadasii was identified as a separate species other than C. immitis in 2002 after a phylogenetic analysis. The two species can be distinguished by DNA polymorphisms and different rates of growth in the presence of high salt concentrations: C. posadasii grows more slowly. It also differs epidemiologically, since it is found outside the San Joaquin Valley. Unlike C. immitis, which is geographically largely limited to California, C. posadasii can also be found in northern Mexico and South America.

== Early history ==
As an intern in Buenos Aires in 1892, Alejandro Posadas described an Argentine soldier that had a dermatological problem since 1889. Posadas had seen the patient while a medical student in 1891 and skin biopsies revealed organisms resembling the protozoan Coccidia. The patient died in 1898 but during the interim Posadas successfully transmitted the infection to a dog, a cat, and a monkey, by inoculating them with material from his patient.

In 1899 a 40 year old manual laborer from the San Joaquin Valley, a native of the Azores, entered a San Francisco hospital with fungating lesions similar to those of Posadas' patient. Dr. Emmet Rixford, a surgeon at San Francisco's Cooper Medical College, in attempts to determine the cause, concluded it was not from inadvertent self-inoculation. Further research produced a chronic ulcer in a rabbit and a lesion in a dog both excreting pus with the same organisms. Rixford issued a report, co-authored by Dr. Thomas Caspar Gilchrist (1862–1927), that was printed in 1896, one year after the patient died. A pathologist at Johns Hopkins Medical School and Gilchrist studied the material and determined the microbe was not a fungus but a protozoan resembling Coccidia. With the help of parasitologist C.W. Stiles, the organism was named Coccidioides ("resembling Coccidia") immitis ("not mild"). Four years later William Ophüls and Herbert C. Moffitt proved that C. immitis was not a protozoan but was a fungus that existed in two forms. In 1905 Ophüls called the infections "coccidioidal granuloma" and that it could develop from inhalation of the organism. Also in 1905 Samuel Darling studied a case and, referring to the misnamed organism a protozoan, named it Histoplasma capsulatum, meaning three major endemic fungi in the United States were all initially misidentified as protozoa.

Studies by Cooke on the immunology of the disease, and in 1927 a filtrate of culture specimens, later named coccidioidin, began to be used in skin testing to delineate the epidemiology of infection. In 1929 a second-year medical student, Harold Chope, was studying C. immitis in the laboratory of Ernest Dickson at Stanford University Medical School, and breathed in spores becoming infected but he later recovered. In 1934 Myrnie Gifford, a physician at San Francisco General Hospital, joined the Health Department of Kern County, California. She had observed that San Joaquin Valley Fever patients often suffered from erythema nodosum, and all tested positive for coccidioidomycosis. She met Ernest Dickson when he visited her in Kern County, and together they presented evidence to the California Medical Association. The two determined that San Joaquin fever represented C. immitis infection. The Kern County Health Department began obtaining epidemiologic histories and skin testing all cases involving Valley Fever. The investigations revealed, among other things, that a majority of the cases described a history of dust exposure, that coccidioidomycosis was common in the area, and that racial differences determined the host's response to the fungus.

Chope left Stanford Medical School and Dickson recruited a classmate, Charles E. Smith, to replace him. Smith began an extensive 17-month study of coccidioidomycosis in Kern and Tulare County, that also began a lifelong professional focus of study of C. immitis and coccidioidomycosis, even after he became Dean of the School of Public Health at the University of California at Berkeley in 1951, until his death in 1967. Research by Smith resulted in more than a few discoveries that included serologic testing, that chlamydospores of the fungus C. immitis could be wind-blown dispersing the spores when the hot weather converted the soil to dust, scientific results of military personnel testing in the southern San Joaquin Valley before and during WWII, as well as people of Japanese descent (many US citizens) interned in camps, prisoners of war, and agricultural workers. Diagnoses of active disease and skin testing, showed that it was also found in southern Nevada and Utah, western Texas, as well as Arizona, where the southern and central areas appeared to impose the highest risk of infection in the United States. Smith's research added to the fundamental discoveries of microbiology, epidemiology, clinical findings, and diagnosis that had emerged since Posadas' initial case report in 1892.

== Later history ==
Progress in studies from 1997 to 2007, including genomic restriction fragment length polymorphism (RFLP) concluded that there were two separate species. Earlier the two were referred to as types I and II, and later as Non-California and California distributions, determined as clades through microsatellite analyses. Genealogical Concordance Phylogenetic Species Recognition (GCPSR) criteria were met, so the two entities were proposed and generally recognized as two separate species: Coccidioides immitis, and the novel species Coccidioides posadasii.
