= Disseminated coccidioidomycosis =

- Other names: Coccidioidal granuloma
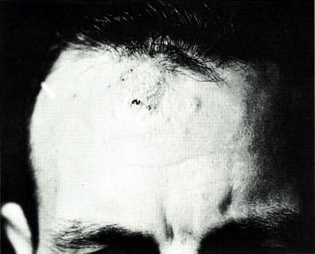
- Characteristic skin granulomata on the forehead.
- Specialty: Infectious diseases

Disseminated coccidioidomycosis is a systemic infection caused by Coccidioides immitis. 15-20% of people with the infection develop skin lesions.

== History of treatment ==
In 1959, "Disseminated Coccidioidomycosis Treated with Amphotericin B" was published in the New York State Journal of Medicine, documenting perhaps one of the earliest uses of the drug amphotericin B for a patient who was admitted to the U.S. Public Health Service Hospital in Seattle, Washington. Disseminated coccidioidomycosis had been lacking specific chemotherapeutic treatment until approximately three years ago when amphotericin B, a polyene antifungal antibiotic, was tried. Since then, there have been a number of reports on the beneficial clinical effect of the drug in patients with coccidioidomycosis.

== See also ==
- Coccidioidomycosis
- List of cutaneous conditions
