= Arvin Federal Government Camp =

- Weedpatch Camp
- U.S. National Register of Historic Places
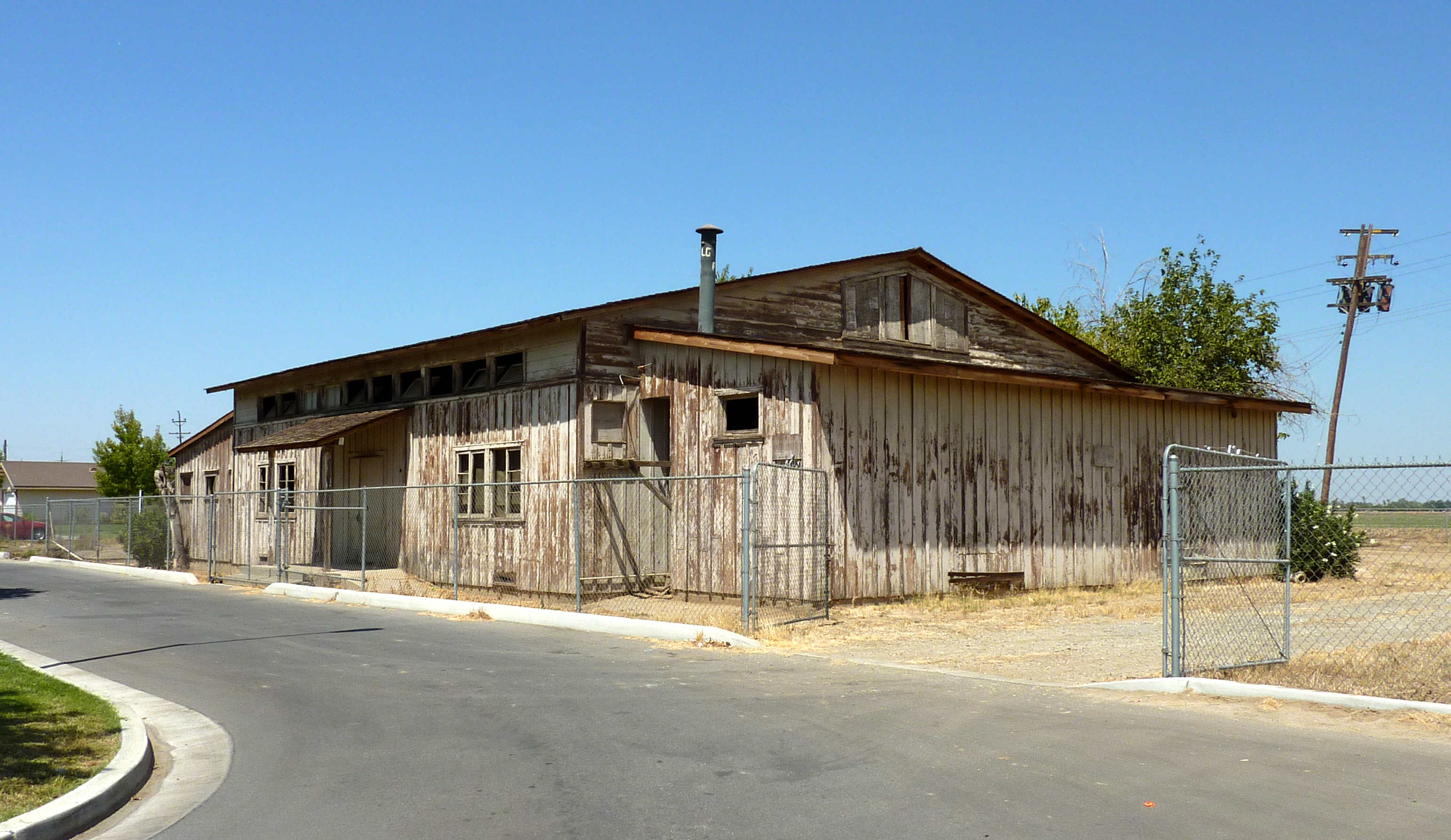
- The Community Hall

- Location within California
- Location: 8701 Sunset Blvd. Bakersfield, California
- Coordinates: 35°13′23″N 118°54′19″W
- Built: 1936
- Architect: Works Progress Administration
- Architectural style: 20th century vernacular
- NRHP reference No.: 95001554
- Added to NRHP: January 22, 1996

Arvin Federal Government Camp, also known as the Weedpatch Camp or Sunset Labor Camp, was built by the Farm Security Administration south of Bakersfield, California, in 1936 to house migrant workers during the Great Depression. The National Register of Historic Places placed several of its historic buildings on the registry on January 22, 1996.

== The Federal Migrant Labor Camp Program ==
Arvin was one of many camps that were set up under the Federal Migrant Labor Camp Program. Under the New Deal thousands of camps for displaced farm workers had been created. The New Deal migrant camp program shifted its approach after a three year survey was completed in 1934. The survey was conducted by the California Division of Immigration and Housing and it reported in regards to the existing camps "No provision is made for sanitation, water supply, or even general camp cleanliness". Photographers such as Dorothea Lange documented the suffering and mistreatment that was occurring at the camps and so the government decided to build two "demonstration camps". One of those was built in Kern County in 1935 and was called the Arvin Federal Government Camp. The camp at Arvin "became the prototype for the entire migrant labor program." Originally the Arvin Federal Government Camp was managed by the Resettlement Administration. But in 1937 the Farm Security Administration replaced the Resettlement Administration which made it in charge of the camp in Arvin.

== History ==
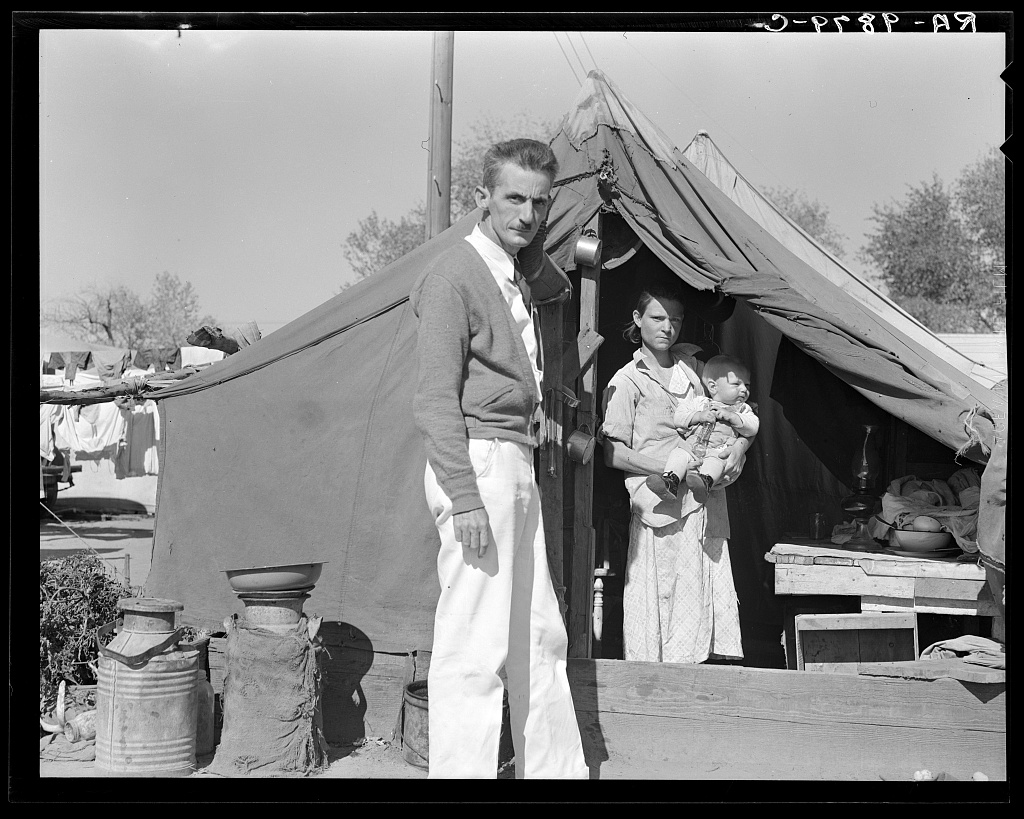
Photograph of camp administrator Tom Collins with migrant mother and child (November 1936)

=== Dust Bowl ===
The history of the Arvin Federal Government Camp begins with the migration of people displaced by the events of the Dust Bowl in the mid-1930s. A combination of droughts and high intensity dust storms forced many farmers in areas such as Oklahoma to vacate and find a new beginning. In the summer of 1934 the date July 24th marked the 36th consecutive day in which temperatures reached over 100 degrees in Oklahoma. The excess heat dried up rivers and fields and the crops that managed to survive were devoured by hordes of grasshoppers. That same year violent winds occurred all over the plains and intensified in 1935 resulting in a series of catastrophic dust storms that were felt as far as New York. With no habitable areas to call home, many were forced to migrate, largely to California where they moved from farm to farm as itinerant laborers. They were joined by other migrant workers from Texas and Arkansas.

=== "Okies" and the arrival of migrants to California ===
The camp is significant in the history of California for the migration of people escaping the Dust Bowl. During the 1930s around 400,000 people without jobs migrated from their homes to find a better life in California. These migrants were known by the derogatory term of Okie and were the subject of discrimination from the local population. "In February 1936, Police Chief James Davis dispatched an “expeditionary force” of 150 police officers to points along the border with orders to enforce a bum blockade." Locals in California took advantage of the influx of Okies that could be used for agricultural labor but did not hesitate to mistreat them. One migrant child who spoke to John Steinbeck put it like this, "When they need us they call us migrants, and when we've picked their crop we're bums and we got to get out".

=== Administration ===
The idea for a labor camp in Kern County was proposed by Lowry Nelson who had been working for the Rural Rehabilitation Division. The project to create and oversee the camp was going to be conducted by the Rural Rehabilitation Division but all of their projects were absorbed by the Resettlement Administration. After the camp was built in 1935 most employees were from the Resettlement Administration. The first administrator of the camp was Tom Collins who set in place an assortment of regulations such as "10 cent daily rental fee for each campsite". This regulation was prompted in part by a push from the Resettlement Administration. Other regulations included a prohibition on liquor and drugs as well as a rule to act peacefully.

=== Town ===
Arvin Federal Government Camp was located on the outskirts of the small towns of Arvin and Weedpatch. The camp now is located in an unincorporated area of Kern County just south of Bakersfield. The camp originally consisted of canvas tents on plywood platforms for the residents as well as some permanent buildings. Before the community building was built in 1939 events were held on a covered stage that included a piano pit. The camp had a community hall and post office. The camp had a library with a paid librarian that worked for the Works Progress Administration. There was also a community barbershop. Later, the residents' tents were replaced by permanent wood frame shacks. The children also had access to a playground that was located within the camp.

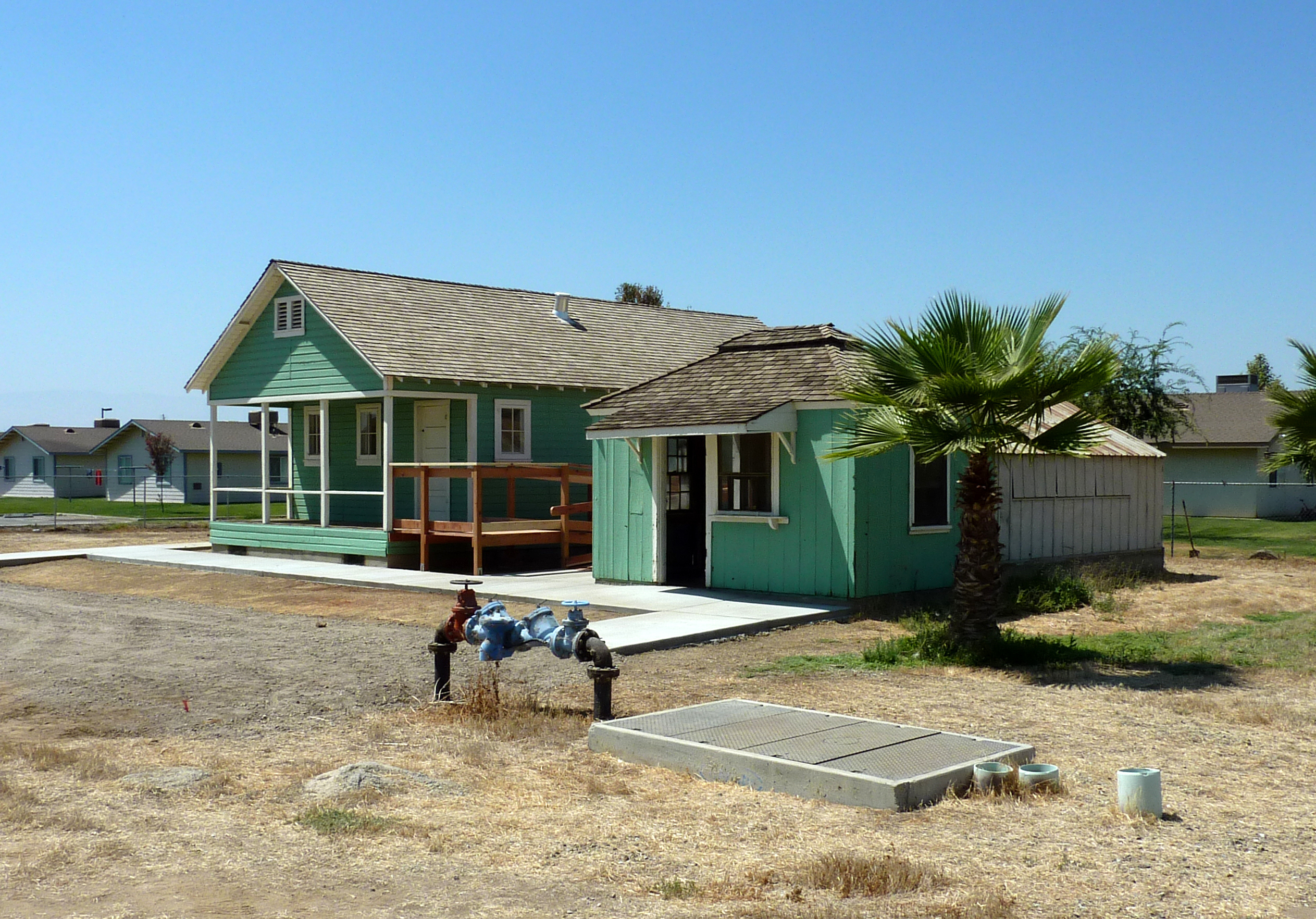
The Library (left) and Post Office (right) buildings were moved and their exteriors restored.

=== Living conditions ===
Because of the inconsistency in farm work for the migrants, many of whom were unable to secure housing, they were forced into a life of homelessness. Many would live on the side of the road or in ditch banks and others would build homes from the materials available, such as packing crates. These homes were coined "Migratory Jungles". Having a home in a labor camp, while a step up from the "Migratory Jungles", still came with its own set of problems. Starvation, unsanitary living conditions, and a lack of access to affordable medical services were issues that plagued residents at the Arvin Federal Government Camp. "Outbreaks of smallpox, tuberculosis, malaria, and pneumonia were common in the camps." Migrant advocate Dr. Myrnie Gifford revealed in a 1937 Kern County Public Health Department annual report that 25% of the migrants in Arvin Federal Labor Camp tested positive for a disease associated with agricultural dust exposure called "valley fever."

=== Community ===
The mistreatment that Okies faced from outsiders forced them to come together and create a community within the confines of the Arvin Federal Government Camp. When community sings were established the turnout within the community was so large that you could not let in visitors. The camp also hosted community dances every weekend which were more popular than the community sings resulting at times in over 500 plus people showing up. One visitor who stopped by for a fourth of July celebration remarked "At times there would be six or eight squares dancing at once" The camp at Arvin lacked a gas station so in 1939, 60 members of the camp each donated a dollar to have one built. The Works Progress Administration paid employees to be present at Arvin offering classes in sewing and quilting which became filled every afternoon. Even when no events were happening the people who lived at the Arvin Federal Government Camp would come together to listen to music or play cards.

=== Modern use ===
While the labor camp gained popularity during the New Deal it continued to be used. A popular site The Living New Deal has a forum in place that allows previous residents at Arvin to discuss their experiences. A prior resident remarks "I lived in the camp for 14 years, 1977 – 1991, and I remember all my friends and the sunset school. We went walking every day. Wonder years!" The camp, while no longer what it once was during the 40s and 50s, continued to serve the community and still exists today. There are three buildings remaining from the camp that make up this National Register of Historic Places property: the community hall, the post office, and the library. The latter two buildings were moved next to the community hall to form the beginnings of a historic park on the property. In 2007, the exteriors of the library and post office buildings were renovated.

== Gallery ==
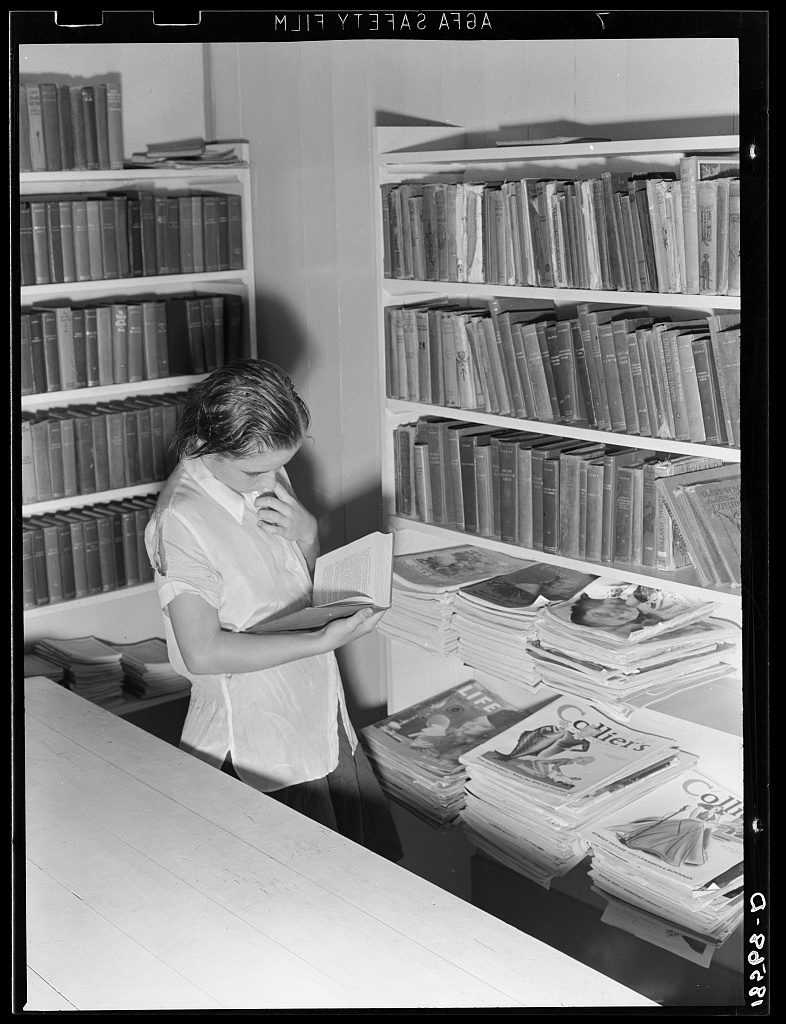
The Library at the Arvin Federal Government Camp with a staffed WPA Librarian.

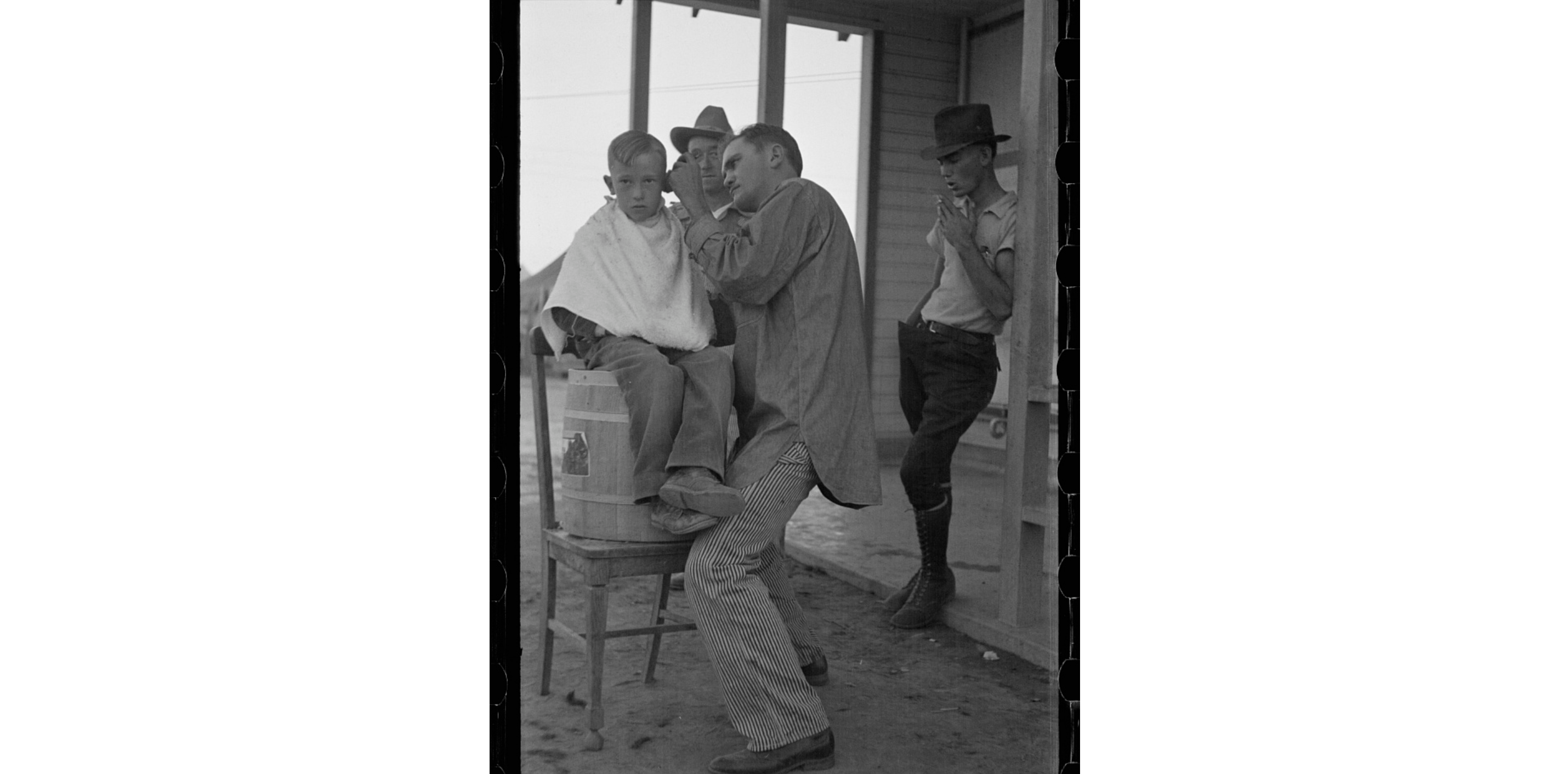
A community barbershop located in the Arvin Federal Government Camp.

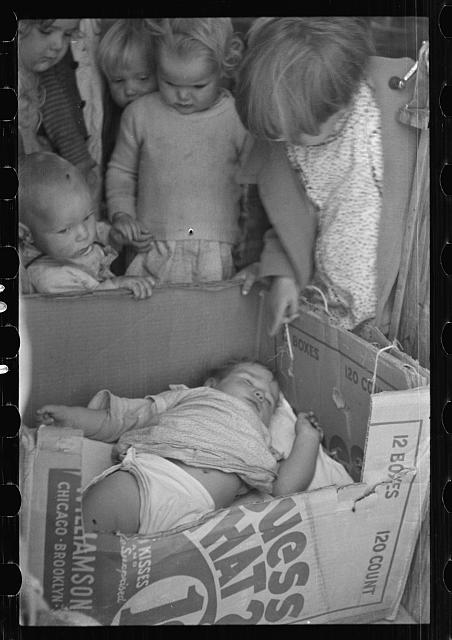
While the mothers are working in the fields, the preschool children of migrant families are cared for in the nursery school under trained teachers at the Arvin Federal Government Camp.

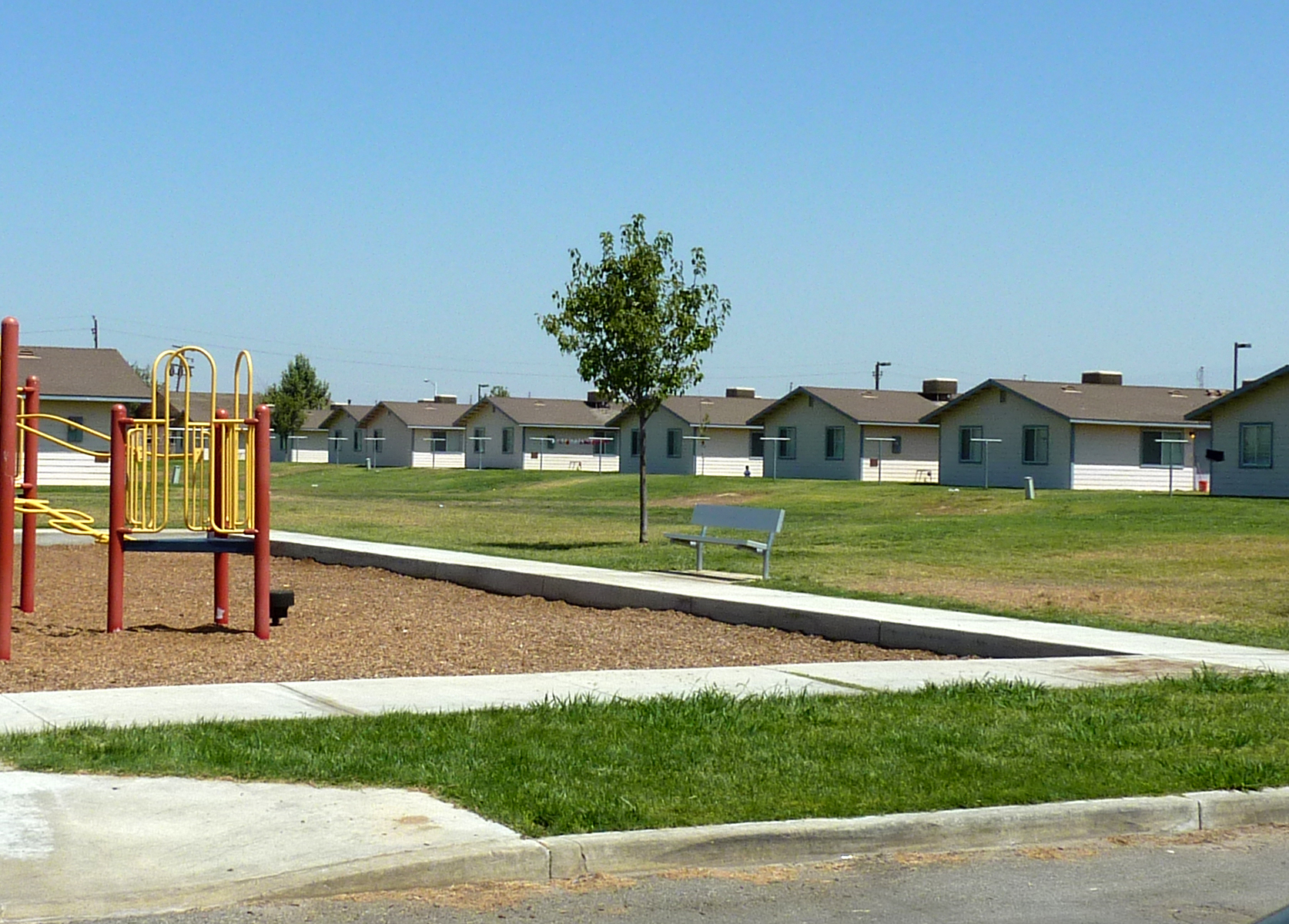
The Weedpatch Camp continues to assist and house migrant workers.

== Books inspired by the camp ==
The plight of the Okies and a description of Weedpatch Camp were chronicled by novelist John Steinbeck in his book The Grapes of Wrath.The book is dedicated to camp administrator Collins who was the model for the character called Jim Rawley. The book was instantly successful and sold over 430,000 copies in a year. But this was not the only book written about the treatment of migrants. Author Sonora Babb worked at the camp under Collins' supervision and wrote Whose Names Are Unknown, a novel depicting the experiences of a migrant family from Oklahoma that went unpublished until 2004 due to her publisher dropping the book shortly after The Grapes of Wrath was released and met with major success.

== See also ==
- California Historical Landmarks in Kern County, California
- National Register of Historic Places listings in Kern County, California

== External Sources ==
- Lutz, Margaret P. Weedpatch Camp, National Register of Historic Places Registration Form. Washington, DC: Department of the Interior, National Park Service, 1995.

On file at the National Park Service and at the California Office of Historic Preservation.
