= Septal panniculitis =

Septal panniculitis is a condition of the subcutaneous fat affecting the layer of adipose tissue that lies between the dermis and underlying fascia, of which there are two forms: acute erythema nodosum and chronic erythema nodosum.

== See also ==
- Erythema nodosum
- List of cutaneous conditions
- Panniculitis
- Skin lesion
