= Alejandro Posadas =

Argentine physician (1870–1902)

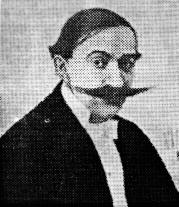
- Born: December 28, 1870; Saladillo, Buenos Aires Province
- Died: November 21, 1902 (aged 31); Paris, France
- Education: University of Buenos Aires
- Scientific career
- Fields: Anatomy, surgery, pediatrics, parasitologist
- Workplaces: University of Buenos Aires; National University of Quilmes

Alejandro Posadas (December 28, 1870 – November 21, 1902) was an Argentine physician and surgeon specializing in pediatric surgery. He was the first person to film an operation and brought the first x-ray to the country of Argentina.

Posadas was the first person to describe coccidioidomycosis (later known as Posadas Disease) and Coccidioides posadasii was named after him.

A victim of tuberculosis, he died while studying in France in 1902 at the age of 31.

== Legacy ==
Hospital Nacional Dr. Alejandro Posadas in Moron, Argentina, is named after him.
