= Xavier Vilanova i Montiu =

Catalan dermatologist

Xavier Vilanova I Montiu (Barcelona, 1 August 1902 - Paris, 8 May 1965) was a Catalan dermatologist. His father, Pelai Vilanova i Massanet, was considered one of the creators of Catalan dermatology.

He graduated in Medicine from the University of Barcelona in 1923. Subsequently, following his family's advice he moved to Paris to specialize in dermatology at the Hospital Saint Louis, then stayed for a period in Strasbourg and Milan where he received training from other leading scientists. On his return to Spain, he obtained a doctorate in Medicine in Madrid in 1928. In the wake of the Spanish Civil War, he traveled in 1936 to Colombia to run the leprosarium Aguas de Dios. Again back in Spain, he was Chair of Dermatology at the University of Valladolid in 1942, at the University of Valencia in 1944 and finally at the University of Barcelona in 1947.

He directed the Professional School of Dermatology of Barcelona in 1952. His extensive scientific activity was reflected in more than five hundred publications, attaining, furthermore, numerous national and international distinctions. He was Honorary President of the Spanish Academy of Dermatology and a member of the National Academy of Medicine of France, where he was nominated Officier de l'Ordre de la Santé Publique. He was also an honorary member of the German, Argentinian, Brazilian, French, German, Dutch, Belgian, Iranian, Italian, Mexican, Portuguese, Uruguayan, Venezuelan and Israeli Dermatological Societies. He was elected president of the Ibero-Latin-American College of Dermatology in 1962 and of the Spanish Academy of Dermatology in 1963. His appointment as an expert in the Venerology and Treponematosis Section of the World Health Organization, was a recognition of his status as a specialist in sexually transmitted diseases. He was supposed to be the President of the Fifth International Ibero Latin-American Congress to be held in Barcelona in 1967; but he died in 1965.

The medical eponym Vilanova-Cañadell syndrome is named for Vilanova and Dr. Josep Maria Cañadell i Vidal.
