= Coccidioidomycosis =

Fungal infection

- Other names: cocci, Valley fever, California fever, desert rheumatism, San Joaquin Valley fever
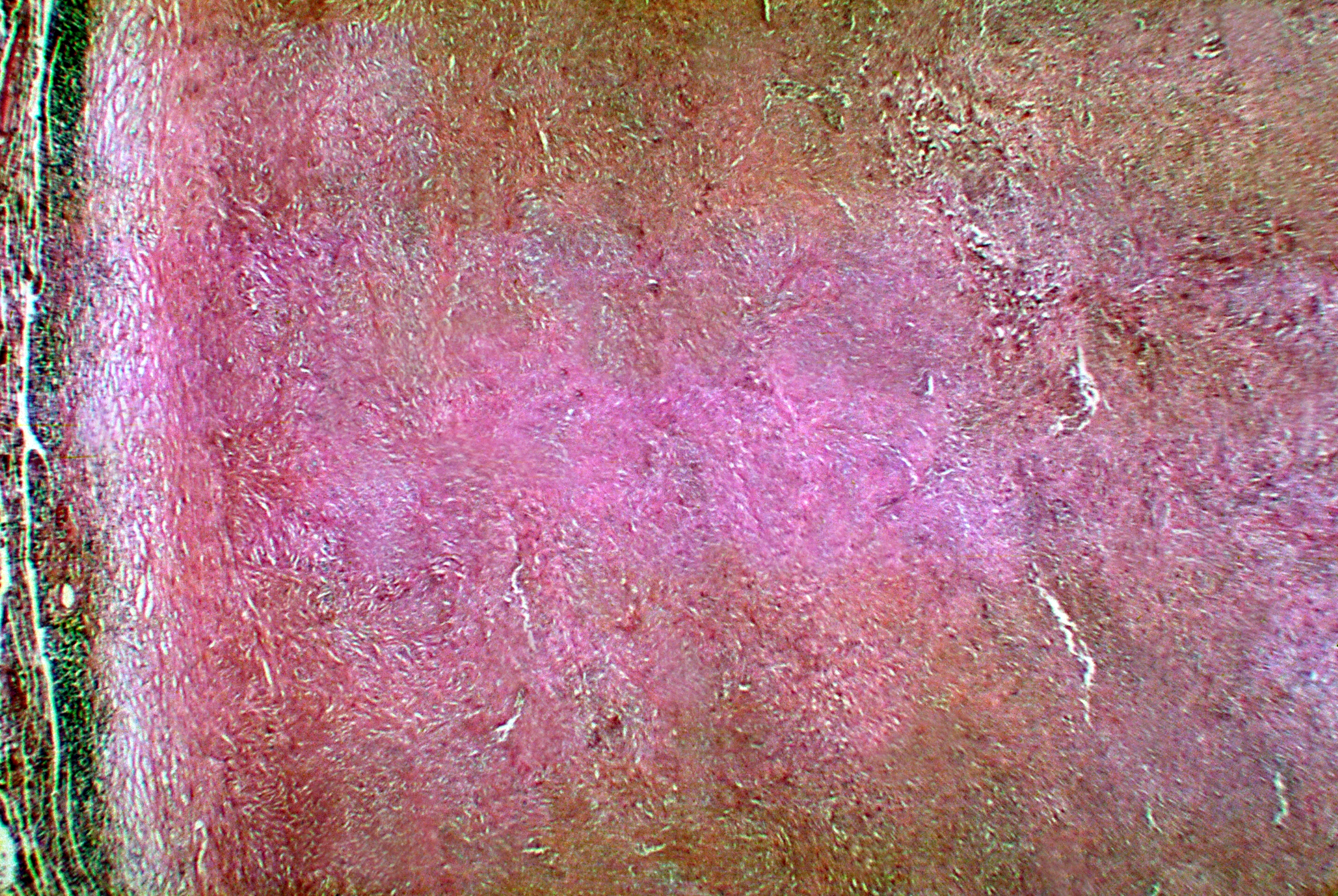
- Histopathological changes in a case of coccidioidomycosis of the lung showing a large fibrocaseous nodule
- Specialty: Infectious disease
- Types: Acute, chronic
- Causes: Coccidioides
- Treatment: Antifungal medication
- Medication: Amphotericin B, itraconazole, fluconazole

Coccidioidomycosis (/kɒkˌsɪdiɔɪdoʊmaɪˈkoʊsɪs/, kok-SID-ee-oy-doh-my-KOH-sis) is a mammalian fungal disease caused by Coccidioides immitis or Coccidioides posadasii. It is commonly known as cocci, Valley fever, or San Joaquin Valley fever. Coccidioidomycosis is endemic in certain parts of the United States in Arizona, California, Nevada, New Mexico, Texas, Utah, and northern Mexico.

== Description ==
C. immitis is a dimorphic saprophytic fungus that grows as a mycelium in the soil and produces a spherule form in the host organism. It resides in the soil in certain parts of the southwestern United States, most notably in California and Arizona. It is also commonly found in northern Mexico, and parts of Central and South America. C. immitis is dormant during long dry spells, then develops as a mold with long filaments that break off into airborne spores when it rains. The spores, known as arthroconidia, are swept into the air by disruption of the soil, such as during construction, farming, low-wind or singular dust events, or an earthquake. Windstorms may also cause epidemics far from endemic areas. In December 1977, a windstorm in an endemic area around Arvin, California, led to several hundred cases, including deaths, in non-endemic areas hundreds of miles away.

Coccidioidomycosis is a common cause of community-acquired pneumonia in the endemic areas of the United States. Infections usually occur due to inhalation of the arthroconidial spores after soil disruption. The disease is not contagious. The infection may recur or become chronic.

It was reported in 2022 that Valley fever had been increasing in California's Central Valley for years (1,000 cases in Kern County in 2014, 3,000 in 2021); experts said that cases could rise across the American West as the climate makes the landscape drier and hotter.

== Classification ==
After Coccidioides infection, coccidioidomycosis begins with Valley fever, its initial acute form. Valley fever may progress to the chronic form and then to disseminated coccidioidomycosis. Therefore, coccidioidomycosis may be divided into the following types:

- Acute coccidioidomycosis, sometimes described in the literature as primary pulmonary coccidioidomycosis
- Chronic coccidioidomycosis
- Disseminated coccidioidomycosis, which includes primary cutaneous coccidioidomycosis

Valley fever is not a contagious disease. In some cases, the infection may recur or become chronic.

== Signs and symptoms ==
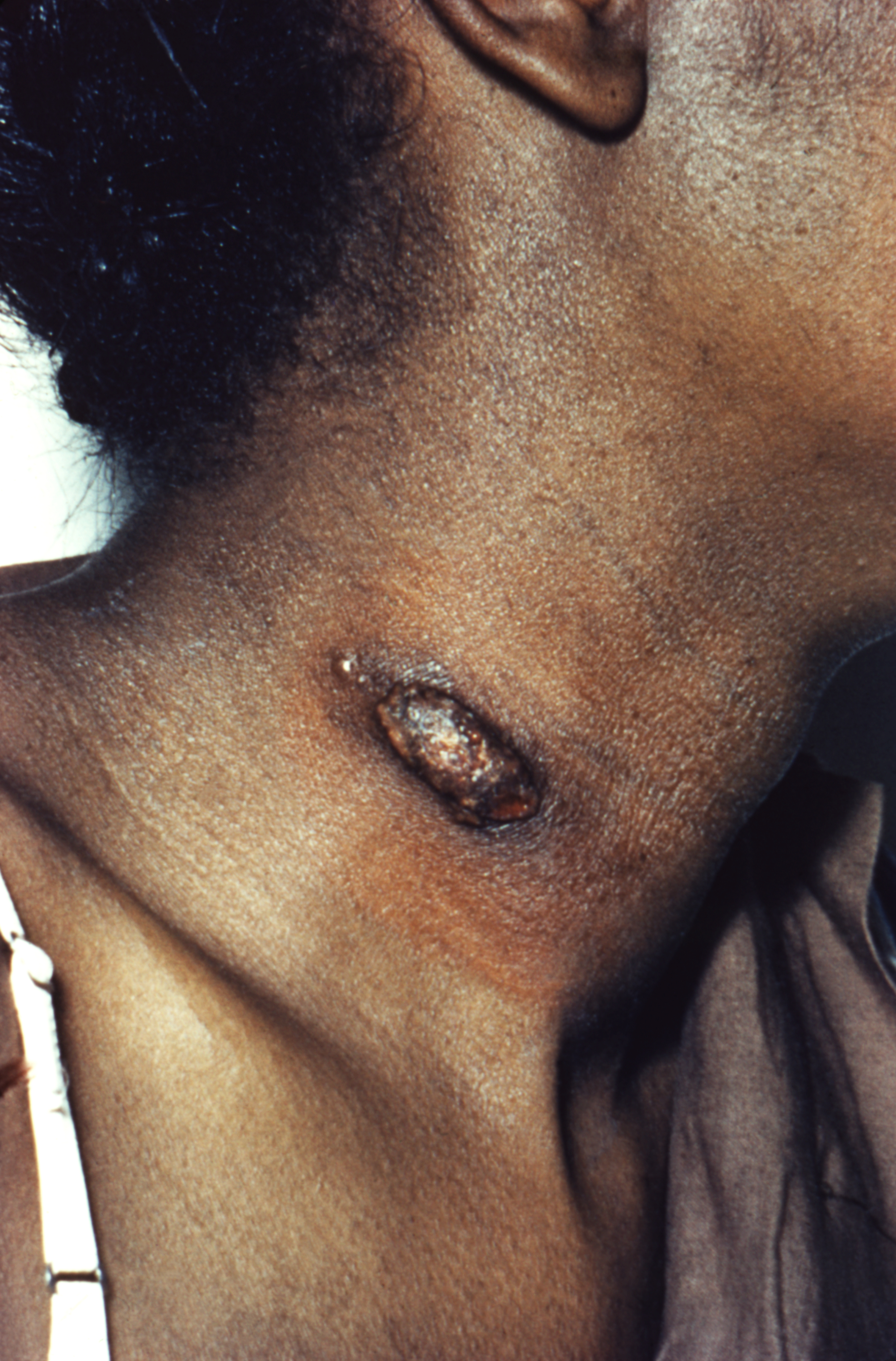
A skin lesion due to Coccidioides infection

An estimated 60% of people infected with the fungi responsible for coccidioidomycosis have minimal to no symptoms, while 40% will have a range of possible clinical symptoms. Of those who do develop symptoms, the primary infection is most often respiratory, with symptoms resembling bronchitis or pneumonia that resolve over a matter of a few weeks. In endemic regions, coccidioidomycosis is responsible for 20% of cases of community-acquired pneumonia. Notable coccidioidomycosis signs and symptoms include a profound feeling of tiredness, loss of smell and taste, fever, cough, headaches, rash, muscle pain, and joint pain. Fatigue can persist for many months after initial infection. The classic triad of coccidioidomycosis known as "desert rheumatism" includes the combination of fever, joint pains, and erythema nodosum.

A minority (3–5%) of infected individuals do not recover from the initial acute infection and develop a chronic infection. This can take the form of chronic lung infection or widespread disseminated infection (affecting the tissues lining the brain, soft tissues, joints, and bone). Chronic infection is responsible for most of the morbidity and mortality. Chronic fibrocavitary disease is manifested by cough (sometimes productive of mucus), fevers, night sweats, and weight loss. Osteomyelitis, including involvement of the spine, and meningitis may occur months to years after initial infection. Severe lung disease may develop in HIV-infected persons.

=== Complications ===
Serious complications may occur in patients who have weakened immune systems, including severe pneumonia with respiratory failure and bronchopleural fistulas requiring resection, lung nodules, and a possible disseminated form, where the infection spreads throughout the body. The disseminated form of coccidioidomycosis can devastate the body, causing skin ulcers, abscesses, bone lesions, swollen joints with severe pain, heart inflammation, urinary tract problems, and inflammation of the brain's lining, which can lead to death. Coccidioidomycosis is a common cause of community-acquired pneumonia in the endemic areas of the United States. Infections usually occur due to inhalation of the arthroconidial spores after soil disruption.

A particularly severe case of meningitis caused by Valley fever in 2012 initially received several incorrect diagnoses, such as sinus infections and cluster headaches. The patient could not work during the diagnosis and the original search for treatments. Eventually, the right treatment was found—albeit with severe side effects—requiring four pills a day and medication administered directly into the brain every 16 weeks.

== Cause ==
Life cycle of Coccidioides

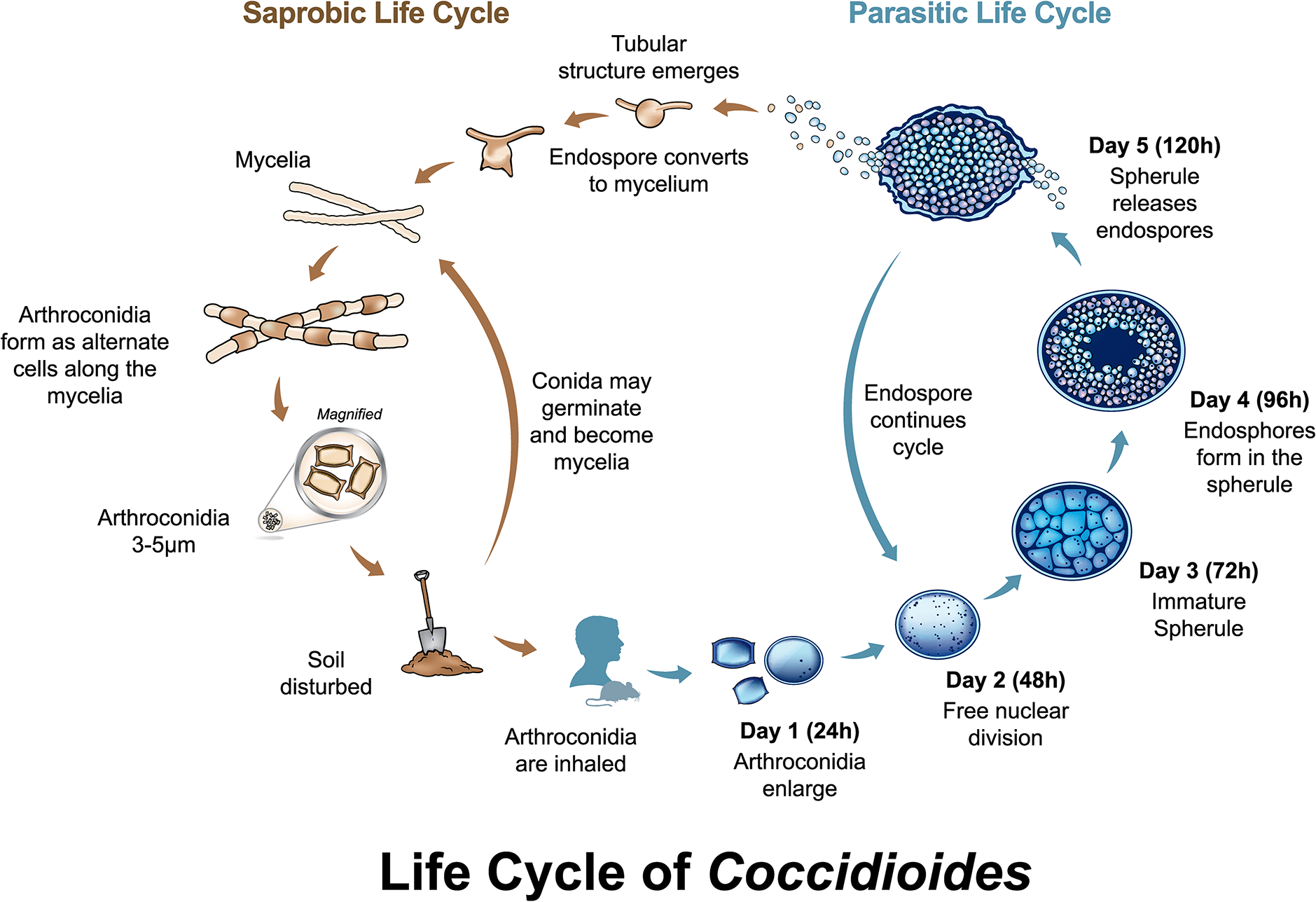
Both Coccidioides species share the same asexual life cycle, switching between saprobic (on left) and parasitic (on right) life stages.

C. immitis is a dimorphic saprophytic fungus that grows as a mycelium in the soil and produces a spherule form in the host organism. It resides in the soil in certain parts of the southwestern United States, most notably in California and Arizona. It is also commonly found in northern Mexico, and parts of Central and South America. C. immitis is dormant during long dry spells, then develops as a mold with long filaments that break off into airborne spores when it rains. The spores, known as arthroconidia, are swept into the air by disruption of the soil, such as during construction, farming, low-wind or singular dust events, or an earthquake. Windstorms may also cause epidemics far from endemic areas. In December 1977, a windstorm in an endemic area around Arvin, California led to several hundred cases, including deaths, in non-endemic areas hundreds of miles away.

Rain starts the cycle of initial growth of the fungus in the soil. In soil (and in agar media), Coccidioides exist in filament form. It forms hyphae in both horizontal and vertical directions. Over a prolonged dry period, cells within hyphae degenerate to form alternating barrel-shaped cells (arthroconidia) which are light in weight and carried by air currents. This happens when the soil is disturbed, often by clearing trees, construction, or farming. As the population grows, so do all these activities, causing a potential cascade effect. The more land that is cleared and the more arid the soil, the riper the environment for Coccidioides. These spores can be easily inhaled unknowingly. On reaching alveoli, they enlarge in size to become spherules, and internal septations develop. This division of cells is made possible by the optimal temperature inside the body. Septations develop and form endospores within the spherule. The rupture of spherules releases these endospores, which in turn repeat the cycle and spread the infection to adjacent tissues within the infected individual's body. Nodules can form in the lungs surrounding these spherules. When they rupture, they release their contents into the bronchi, forming thin-walled cavities. These cavities can cause symptoms including characteristic chest pain, coughing up blood, and persistent cough. In individuals with a weakened immune system, the infection can spread through the blood. The fungus can also, rarely, enter the body through a break in the skin and cause infection.

== Diagnosis ==
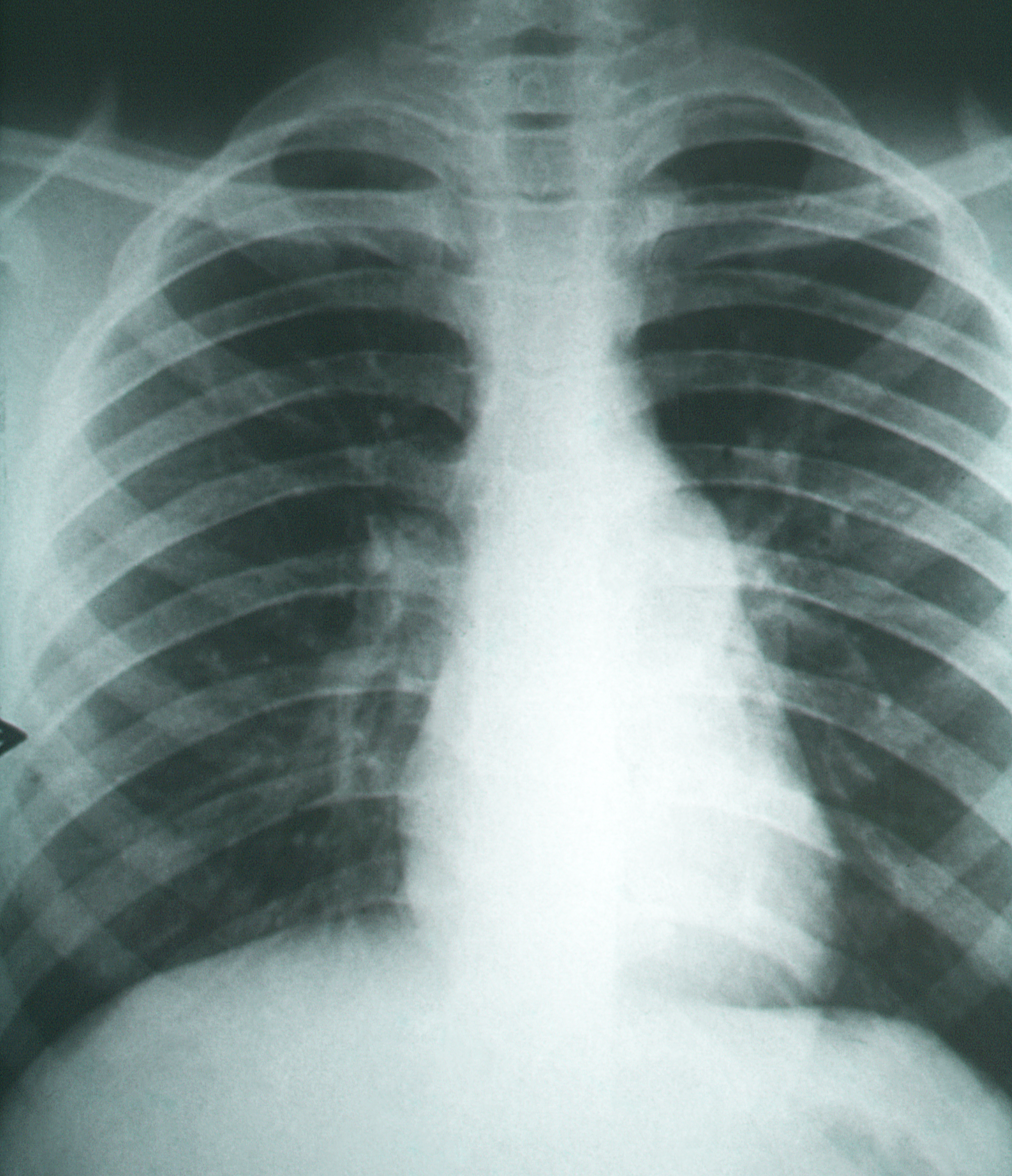
A case of pulmonary fibrosis caused by coccidioidomycosis

Coccidioidomycosis diagnosis relies on a combination of an infected person's signs and symptoms, findings on radiographic imaging, and laboratory results. The disease is commonly misdiagnosed as bacterial community-acquired pneumonia. The fungal infection can be demonstrated by microscopic detection of diagnostic cells in body fluids, exudates, sputum and biopsy tissue by methods of Papanicolaou or Grocott's methenamine silver staining. These stains can demonstrate spherules and surrounding inflammation.

With specific nucleotide primers, C. immitis DNA can be amplified by polymerase chain reaction (PCR). It can also be detected in culture by morphological identification or by using molecular probes that hybridize with C. immitis RNA. C. immitis and C. posadasii cannot be distinguished on cytology or by symptoms, but only by DNA PCR.

An indirect demonstration of fungal infection can also be achieved by serologic analysis detecting fungal antigen or host IgM or IgG antibody produced against the fungus. The available tests include the tube-precipitin (TP) assays, complement fixation assays, and enzyme immunoassays. TP antibody is not found in cerebrospinal fluid (CSF). TP antibody is specific and is used as a confirmatory test, whereas ELISA is sensitive and thus used for initial testing.

If the meninges are affected, CSF will show abnormally low glucose levels, an increased level of protein, and lymphocytic pleocytosis. Rarely, CSF eosinophilia is present.

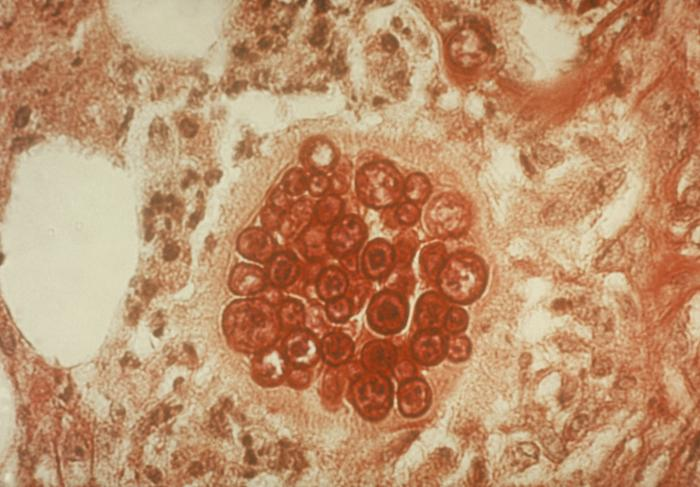
PAS stain of a coccidioidomycosis spherule

=== Imaging ===
Chest X-rays rarely demonstrate lung nodules or cavities. These images commonly demonstrate lung opacification, pleural effusions, or enlargement of lymph nodes associated with the lungs. Computed tomography scans of the chest are more sensitive than chest X-rays to detect these changes.

== Prevention ==
Preventing coccidioidomycosis is challenging because it is difficult to avoid breathing in the fungus should it be present; however, the public health effects of the disease are essential to understand in areas where the fungus is endemic. Enhancing surveillance of coccidioidomycosis is key to preparedness in the medical field and improving diagnostics for early infections. No completely effective preventive measures are available for people who live or travel through Valley fever-endemic areas. Recommended preventive measures include avoiding airborne dust or dirt, but this does not guarantee protection against infection. People in certain occupations may be advised to wear face masks. The use of air filtration indoors is also helpful, in addition to keeping skin injuries clean and covered to avoid skin infection.

From 1998 to 2011, there were 111,117 U.S. cases of coccidioidomycosis logged in the National Notifiable Diseases Surveillance System (NNDSS). Since many U.S. states do not require reporting of coccidioidomycosis, the actual numbers may be higher. The United States' Centers for Disease Control and Prevention (CDC) called the disease a "silent epidemic" and acknowledged that there is no proven anticoccidioidal vaccine available. A 2001 cost-effectiveness analysis indicated that a potential vaccine could improve health as well as reducing total health care expenditures among infants, teens, and immigrant adults, and more modestly improve health but increase total health care expenditures in older age groups.

Raising surveillance and disease awareness while medical researchers develop a human vaccine can positively contribute to prevention efforts. Research demonstrates that patients from endemic areas who are aware of the disease are most likely to request diagnostic testing for coccidioidomycosis. Presently, Meridian Bioscience manufactures the so-called EIA test to diagnose the Valley fever, which however is known for producing a fair quantity of false positives. Recommended prevention measures can include type-of-exposure-based respirator protection for persons engaged in agriculture, construction, and others working outdoors in endemic areas. Dust control measures such as planting grass and wetting the soil, and also limiting exposure to dust storms are advisable for residential areas in endemic regions. The National Institute for Occupational Safety and Health identifies coccidioidomycosis as an occupational concern for workers in agriculture, archaeology, construction, geology, mining, oil and gas extraction, firefighting, and the military in endemic areas.

== Treatment ==
Significant disease develops in fewer than 5% of those infected and typically occurs in those with a weakened immune system. Mild asymptomatic cases often do not require any treatment. Those with severe symptoms may benefit from antifungal therapy, which requires 3–6 months or more of treatment, depending on the response to the treatment. There is a lack of prospective studies that examine optimal antifungal therapy for coccidioidomycosis.

On the whole, oral fluconazole and intravenous amphotericin B are used in progressive or disseminated disease or immunocompromised individuals. Amphotericin B was originally the only available treatment, but alternatives, including itraconazole and ketoconazole, became available for milder disease. Fluconazole is the preferred medication for coccidioidal meningitis, due to its penetration into CSF. Intrathecal or intraventricular amphotericin B therapy is used if infection persists after fluconazole treatment. Itraconazole is used for cases of coccidioidomycosis infections that involve a person's bones and joints. The antifungal medications posaconazole and voriconazole have also been used to treat coccidioidomycosis. Because the symptoms of coccidioidomycosis are similar to those of common flu, pneumonia, and other respiratory diseases, public health professionals need to be aware of the rise of coccidioidomycosis and the specifics of diagnosis. Greyhound dogs often get coccidioidomycosis; their treatment regimen involves 6–12 months of ketoconazole taken with food.

=== Toxicity ===
Conventional amphotericin B desoxycholate (AmB: used since the 1950s as a primary agent) is known to be associated with increased drug-induced nephrotoxicity impairing kidney function. Other formulations have been developed such as lipid-soluble formulations to mitigate side-effects such as direct proximal and distal tubular cytotoxicity. These include liposomal amphotericin B, amphotericin B lipid complex such as Abelcet (brand) amphotericin B phospholipid complex also as AmBisome Intravenous, or Amphotec Intravenous (Generic; Amphotericin B Cholesteryl Sul), and amphotericin B colloidal dispersion, all shown to exhibit a decrease in nephrotoxicity. The latter was not as effective in one study as amphotericin B desoxycholate which had a 50% murine (rat and mouse) morbidity rate versus zero for the AmB colloidal dispersion.

The cost of the nephrotoxic AmB deoxycholate, in 2015, for a patient of 70 kilograms (150 lb) at 1 mg/kg/day dosage, was approximately US$63.80, compared to $1318.80 for 5 mg/kg/day of the less toxic liposomal AmB.

== Epidemiology ==
Coccidioidomycosis is endemic to the western hemisphere between 40°N and 40°S, including certain parts of the United States in Arizona, California, Nevada, New Mexico, Texas, Utah, and northern Mexico. The ecological niches are characterized by hot summers and mild winters with an annual rainfall of 10–50 cm (4–20 in). The species are found in alkaline sandy soil, typically 10–30 cm (4–12 in) below the surface. In harmony with the mycelium life cycle, incidence increases with periods of dryness after a rainy season; this phenomenon, termed "grow and blow", refers to the growth of the fungus in wet weather, producing spores that are spread by the wind during succeeding dry weather. While most cases are observed in the endemic region, cases reported outside the area are generally visitors who contract the infection and return to their native areas before becoming symptomatic.

=== North America ===
In the United States, C. immitis is endemic to southern and central California, with the highest presence in the San Joaquin Valley. C. posadassi is most prevalent in Arizona, although it can be found in a wider region spanning Utah, New Mexico, Texas, and Nevada.

Coccidioidomycosis is a nationally notifiable disease in the United States, but it is reportable in only about 28 states and the District of Columbia, so national counts understate the true burden. States reported 21,037 cases to the Centers for Disease Control and Prevention (CDC) in 2023, continuing a long-term upward trend from roughly 2,000–3,000 cases per year in the late 1990s. A 2025 CDC-led modeling study estimated that about 273,000 symptomatic infections (95% credible interval 206,000–360,000), 18,000–28,000 hospitalizations, and 700–1,100 deaths occurred nationally in 2019, roughly 10 to 18 times the number of cases captured by surveillance. Underdiagnosis occurs because the illness is frequently mistaken for bacterial or viral community-acquired pneumonia, because testing is inconsistent, and because many people with mild symptoms never seek care.

Incidence varies widely across the West and Southwest. In Arizona, for instance, in 2007, there were 3,450 cases in Maricopa County, which in 2007 had an estimated population of 3,880,181 for an incidence of approximately 1 in 1,125. In contrast, though southern New Mexico is considered an endemic region, there were 35 cases in the entire state in 2008 and 23 in 2007, in a region that had an estimated 2008 population of 1,984,356, for an incidence of approximately 1 in 56,695.

Infection rates vary greatly by county, and although population density is important, so are other factors that have not been proven yet. Greater construction activity may disturb spores in the soil. In addition, the effect of altitude on fungi growth and morphology has not been studied, and altitude can range from sea level to 10,000 feet or higher across California, Arizona, Utah, and New Mexico.

Arizona and California together account for the large majority of reported cases. In Arizona, the reported incidence rose from 84.4 per 100,000 population in 2014 to 146.0 per 100,000 in 2023, when the state recorded 10,990 cases and 74 attributable deaths; most cases occur in Maricopa, Pima, and Pinal counties. California reported between about 7,000 and 9,000 cases annually from 2017 through 2023, then nearly 12,500 cases in 2024, the highest annual total the state has documented. Provisional counts for the first half of 2025 exceeded 5,500, and the California Department of Public Health noted that, while incidence remains highest in the southern San Joaquin Valley, cases have been increasing in the northern Central Valley and the Central Coast. Following the 1994 Northridge earthquake, there was a sudden increase of cases in the areas affected by the quake, at a pace of over 10 times baseline.

Infections acquired outside the traditionally recognized endemic area have also been documented, including locally acquired cases in south-central Washington first reported in the early 2010s (see below).

There was an outbreak in the summer of 2001 in Colorado, away from where the disease was considered endemic. A group of archeologists visited Dinosaur National Monument, and eight crew members, along with two National Park Service workers, were diagnosed with Valley fever.

California state prisons, beginning in 1919, have been particularly affected by coccidioidomycosis. In 2005 and 2006, the Pleasant Valley State Prison near Coalinga and Avenal State Prison near Avenal on the western side of the San Joaquin Valley had the highest incidence in 2005, of at least 3,000 per 100,000. The receiver appointed in Plata v. Schwarzenegger issued an order in May 2013 requiring relocation of vulnerable populations in those prisons. The incidence rate has been increasing, with rates as high as 7% during 2006–2010. The cost of care and treatment is $23 million in California prisons. A lawsuit was filed against the state in 2014 on behalf of 58 inmates stating that the Avenal and Pleasant Valley state prisons did not take necessary steps to prevent infections.

=== Population risk factors ===
Several populations have a higher risk of contracting coccidioidomycosis and developing the advanced disseminated version of the disease. Populations exposed to airborne arthroconidia, such as those working in agriculture and construction, have a higher risk. Outbreaks have also been linked to earthquakes, windstorms, and military training exercises where the ground is disturbed. Historically, an infection is more likely to occur in males than females, although this could be attributed to occupation rather than being sex-specific. Women who are pregnant and immediately postpartum are at a high risk of infection and dissemination. There is also an association between the stage of pregnancy and the severity of the disease, with women in their third trimester being more likely to develop dissemination. Presumably, this is related to highly elevated hormonal levels, which stimulate the growth and maturation of spherules and the subsequent release of endospores. Certain ethnic populations are more susceptible to disseminated coccidioidomycosis. The risk of dissemination is 175 times greater in Filipinos and 10 times greater in African Americans than in non-Hispanic whites. Individuals with a weakened immune system are also more susceptible to the disease. In particular, individuals with HIV and diseases that impair T-cell function. Individuals with pre-existing conditions such as diabetes are also at a higher risk. Age also affects the severity of the disease, with more than one-third of deaths being in the 65–84 age group.

== History ==
The first case of what was later named coccidioidomycosis was described in 1892 in Buenos Aires by Alejandro Posadas, a medical intern at the Hospital de Clínicas "José de San Martín". Posadas established an infectious character of the disease after being able to transfer it in laboratory conditions to laboratory animals. In the U.S., Dr. E. Rixford, a physician from a San Francisco hospital, and T. C. Gilchrist, a pathologist at Johns Hopkins Medical School, became early pioneers of clinical studies of the infection. They decided that the causative organism was a Coccidia-type protozoan and named it Coccidioides immitis (resembling Coccidia, not mild).

Dr. William Ophüls, a professor at Stanford University Hospital (San Francisco), discovered that the causative agent of the disease that was at first called Coccidioides infection and later coccidioidomycosis was a fungal pathogen, and coccidioidomycosis was also distinguished from histoplasmosis and blastomycosis. Further, Coccidioides immitis was identified as the culprit of respiratory disorders previously called San Joaquin Valley fever, desert fever, and Valley fever, and a serum precipitin test was developed by Charles E. Smith that was able to detect an acute form of the infection. In retrospect, Smith played a major role in both medical research and raising awareness about coccidioidomycosis, especially when he became dean of the School of Public Health at the University of California at Berkeley in 1951.

Coccidioides immitis was considered by the United States during the 1950s and 1960s as a potential biological weapon. The strain selected for investigation was designated with the military symbol OC, and initial expectations were for its deployment as a human incapacitant. Medical research suggested that OC might have had some lethal effects on the populace, and Coccidioides immitis started to be classified by the authorities as a threat to public health. Coccidioides immitis was never weaponized to the public's knowledge, and most of the military research in the mid-1960s was concentrated on developing a human vaccine. Coccidioides immitis is not on the U.S. Department of Health and Human Services' or Centers for Disease Control and Prevention's list of select agents and toxins.

In 2002, Coccidioides posadasii was identified as genetically distinct from Coccidioides immitis despite their morphologic similarities and can also cause coccidioidomycosis.

It was reported in 2022 that valley fever had been increasing in Central Valley of California for years (1,000 cases in Kern County in 2014, 3,000 in 2021); experts said that cases could rise across the American west as the climate and industrial agricultural practices make the landscape drier and hotter. The Coccidioides flourishes due to the oscillation between extreme dryness and wetness. The California Department of Public Health said the 9,280 new cases of Valley fever with onset dates in 2023 was the highest number the department has ever documented.

== One Health and climate change ==
Because Coccidioides lives in soil and infects humans, domestic animals, and wildlife through the same environmental route, coccidioidomycosis is often cited as an example of a disease best addressed through a One Health approach that links human, animal, and environmental health. The fungus is not transmitted between hosts; risk is determined by the environment, which is in turn shaped by climate, land use, and soil disturbance.

=== Climate and geographic range ===
The growth and dispersal of Coccidioides depend on cycles of precipitation and drought: wet periods support growth of the fungus in soil, and subsequent dry, windy conditions release infectious arthroconidia into the air. A 2022 analysis of two decades of case data from the western United States found that incidence rose after wet winters that followed multi-year droughts, consistent with this "grow and blow" pattern, and that drought–rain cycles are becoming more pronounced with climate change. Climate-niche modeling suggests that the area of the United States suitable for Coccidioides will expand as temperatures rise and precipitation patterns shift. One widely cited model projected that under a high-warming scenario the climate-limited endemic region could more than double in area by 2100, extend from 12 to 17 states, and produce roughly 50% more cases, with expansion northward through the Great Plains and Pacific Northwest. Locally acquired infections have already been confirmed in eastern Washington, well outside the historically defined endemic zone.

=== Animals as sentinels ===
Dogs are highly susceptible to coccidioidomycosis and, because they dig and sniff at the ground, are typically exposed to spores earlier and more intensely than the people they live with. This has led researchers to use canine infections as a sentinel for human risk. A 2025 study that analyzed 834,899 Coccidioides antibody test results from dogs across the United States between 2012 and 2022 found positive results in many counties and states with few or no reported human cases, suggesting that the geographic distribution of the fungus is wider than human surveillance indicates. The authors argued that canine infection is not currently reportable in any state and that adding animal data to public health surveillance could improve early detection of emerging endemic areas.

=== Vaccine development ===
No vaccine is licensed for humans. A live, attenuated vaccine based on a Coccidioides posadasii strain lacking the cps1 gene (Δcps1) protected dogs against experimentally induced pulmonary infection in a 2021 study. The canine vaccine is being developed by Anivive Lifesciences with the University of Arizona Valley Fever Center for Excellence and, as of 2025, was under review for licensure by the United States Department of Agriculture's Center for Veterinary Biologics; the developers describe the dog vaccine as a step toward a human vaccine.

== Research ==
As of 2023, no vaccine is available to prevent infection with Coccidioides immitis or Coccidioides posadasii, but efforts to develop such a vaccine are underway. As of 2021 Anivive Lifesciences and a team at the University of Arizona Medical School was developing a vaccine for use in dogs, which could eventually lead to a vaccine in humans.

== Other animals ==
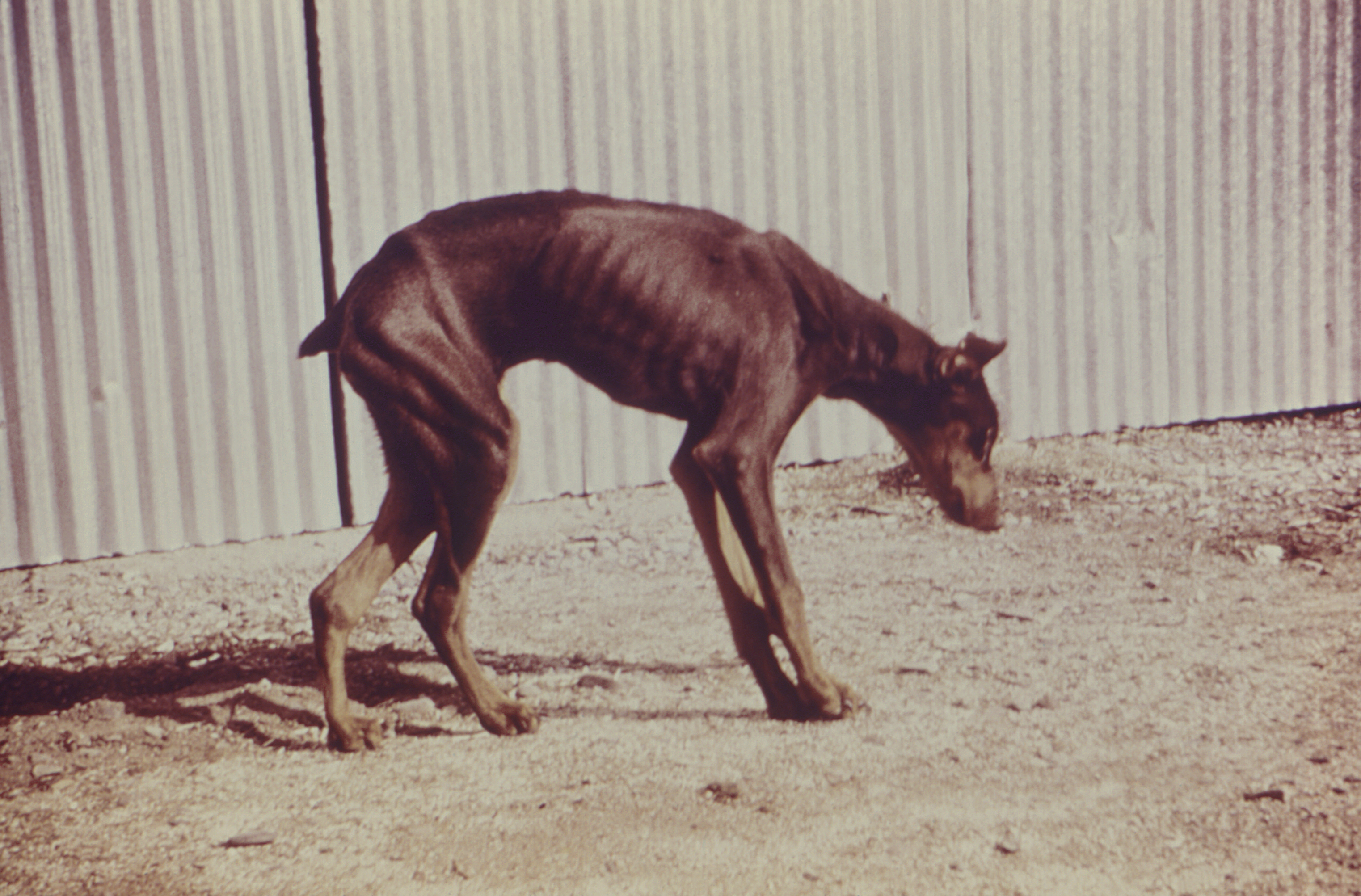
A dog with coccidioidomycosis

In dogs, the initial sign of coccidioidomycosis is often a chronic cough, which can be dry or moist. Other symptoms include fever (in approximately 50% of cases), weight loss, anorexia, lethargy, and depression. The disease can disseminate throughout the dog's body, most commonly causing osteomyelitis (infection of the bone), which leads to lameness. Dissemination can cause other symptoms, depending on which organs are infected. If the fungus infects the heart or pericardium, it can cause heart failure and death. Coccidioidomycosis has also shown a predilection for dissemination to the central nervous system, with infections of the brain manifesting as seizures. Serology is often not as useful diagnostically in the event of CNS dissemination, and MRI is the recommended imaging technique for diagnosis.

In cats, symptoms may include skin lesions, fever, and loss of appetite, with skin lesions being the most common.

Other species in which Valley fever has been found include livestock such as cattle and horses; llamas; marine mammals, including sea otters; zoo animals such as monkeys and apes, kangaroos, tigers, etc.; and wildlife native to the geographic area where the fungus is found, such as cougars, skunks, and javelinas.

== Additional images ==
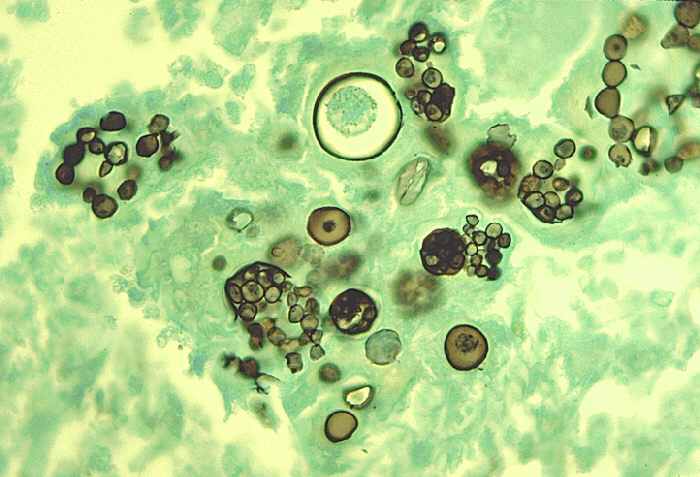
Spherule and endospore forms of Coccidioides immitis

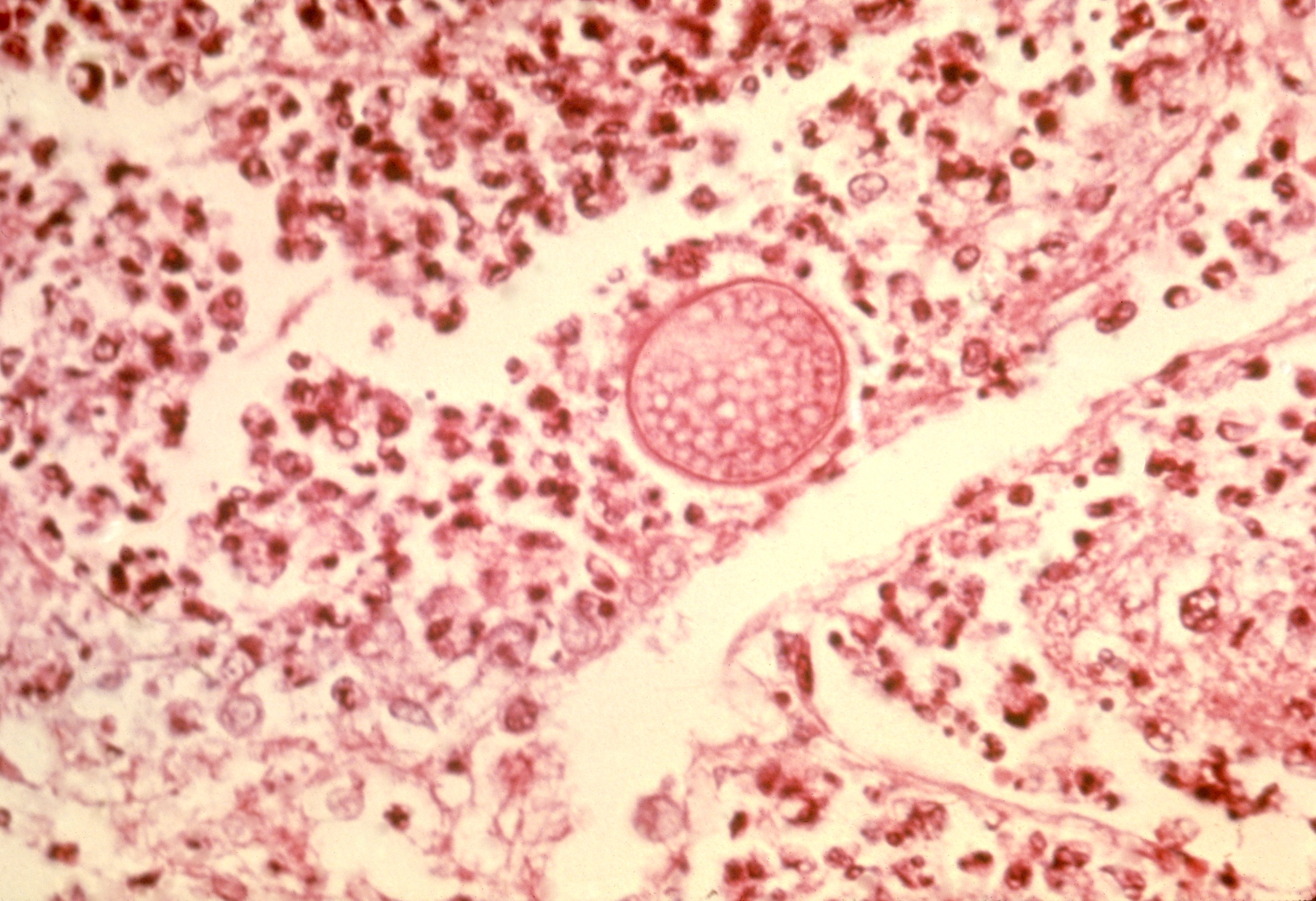
Mature spherule with endospores of Coccidioides immitis

== In popular culture ==
- In the Season 1 episode of Bones called "The Man in the Fallout Shelter", the entire lab is exposed to coccidioidomycosis through inhalation of bone dust. Erroneously, the team is forced to quarantine in the lab on Christmas Eve to prevent the disease from spreading to the public (in real life, the disease is not contagious). The lab is later exposed to it again in the Season 2 episode "The Priest in the Churchyard" from contaminated graveyard soil but only receives a series of injections rather than be forced to quarantine.
- Everything in Between, a 2022 Australian feature film, contains references to coccidioidomycosis.
- In House Season 3 Episode 4, "Lines in the Sand", a 17-year-old patient who has been exposed to Coccidioides immitis exhibits symptoms of coccidioidomycosis.
- Thunderhead, a 1999 novel by Douglas Preston and Lincoln Child, and Esperanza Rising, a 2000 young adult novel both use the fungus and illness as a central plot point.

== See also ==
- Coccidioides
- Coccidioides immitis
- Coccidioides posadasii
- Zygomycosis
- Medical geology
- List of cutaneous conditions
- Thunderhead, a 1999 novel by Douglas Preston and Lincoln Child which uses the fungus and illness as a central plot point.
