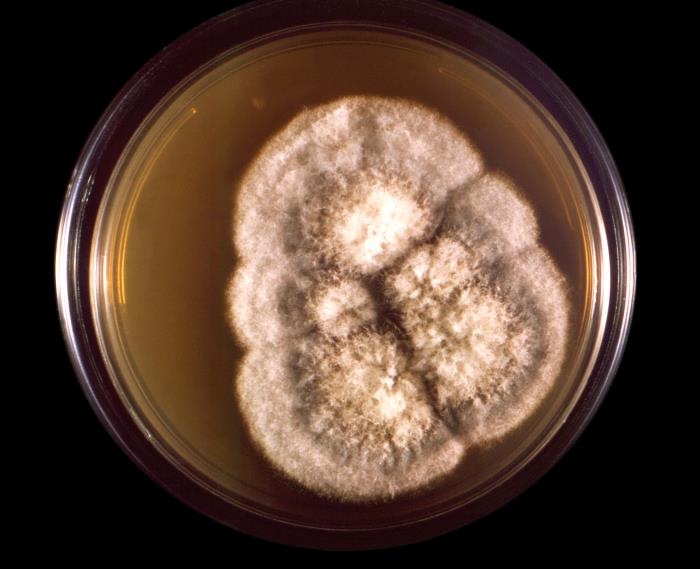
- Colonies of Coccidioides immitis growing in petri dish

Scientific classification
- Kingdom: Fungi
- Division: Ascomycota
- Class: Eurotiomycetes
- Order: Onygenales
- Family: Onygenaceae
- Genus: Coccidioides
- Species: C. immitis

Binomial name
- Coccidioides immitis G.W.Stiles (1896)

Synonyms
- Zymonema immitis (G.W.Stiles) Mello (1918); Mycoderma immite (G.W.Stiles) Verdun & Mandoul (1924); Blastomycoides immitis (G.W.Stiles) Castell. (1928); Geotrichum immite (G.W.Stiles) A.Agostini (1932); Aleurisma immite (G.W.Stiles) Bogliolo & J.A.Neves (1952)

= Coccidioides immitis =

Species of fungus

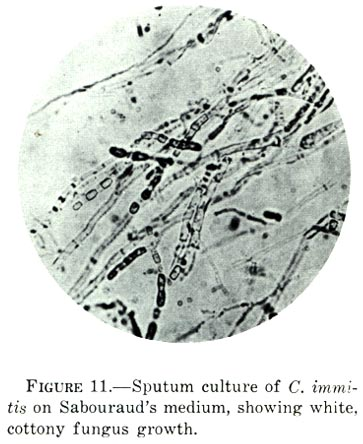
Sputum culture of Coccidioides immitis on Sabouraud's medium, showing white, cottony fungus growth

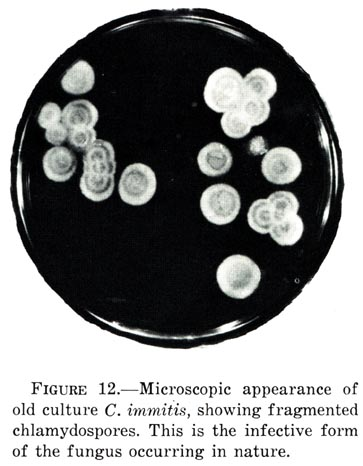
Microscopic appearance of an old culture of Coccidioides immitis, showing fragmented chlamydospores. This is the infective form of the fungus occurring in nature.

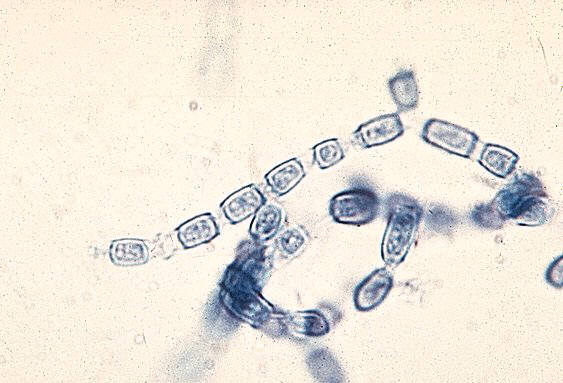
Septate hyphae of Coccidioides immitis with 90-degree branching and thick-walled barrel-shaped arthroconidia alternating with empty cells

Coccidioides immitis is a pathogenic fungus that resides in the soil in certain parts of the southwestern United States, northern Mexico, and a few other areas in the Western Hemisphere.

== Epidemiology ==
C. immitis, along with its relative C. posadasii, is most commonly seen in the desert regions of the southwestern United States, including certain areas of Arizona, California, New Mexico, Nevada, Texas, and Utah; and in Central and South America in Argentina, Brazil, Colombia, Guatemala, Honduras, Mexico, Nicaragua, Paraguay, and Venezuela.

=== Precise location ===
C. immitis is largely found in California, but also Baja California and Arizona, while C. posadasii is regularly found in Texas, northern Mexico and in Central and South America. Both C. immitis and C. posadasii are present in Arizona. C. immitis is more common west of the Tehachapi Mountains, while C. posadasii is more common east of it. Coccidioides spp. are found in alkaline, sandy soils from semi-desert regions with hot summers, gentle winters, and annual rainfall between 10 and 50 centimetres (3.9 and 19.7 in). These fungi are usually found 10 to 30 centimetres (3.9 to 11.8 in) beneath the surface.

== Clinical manifestation ==
C. immitis can cause a disease called coccidioidomycosis (valley fever). Its incubation period varies from 7 to 21 days. Coccidioidomycosis is not easily diagnosed on the basis of vital signs and symptoms, which are usually vague and nonspecific. Even a chest X-ray or CT scan cannot reliably distinguish it from other lung diseases, including lung cancer. Blood or urine tests are administered, which aim to discover Coccidioides antigens. However, because the Coccidioides creates a mass that can mimic a lung tumor, the correct diagnosis may require a tissue sample (biopsy). A Gomori methenamine silver stain can then confirm the presence of the Coccidioides organism's characteristic spherules within the tissue. The C. immitis fungus can be cultured from a patient sample, but the culture can take weeks to grow and requires special precautions on a part of the laboratory staff while handling it (screw cap vials and sterile transfer hoods are recommended). It is reported as the tenth-most often acquired infection in the laboratory conditions with two documented deaths. Until October 2012, C. immitis had been listed as a select agent by both the U.S. Department of Health and Human Services and the U.S. Department of Agriculture, and was considered a biosafety level 3 pathogen.

== Treatment ==
- Most Coccidioides infections have an incubation period from one to four weeks and resolve without specific therapy; few clinical trials have assessed outcomes in less-severe disease.
- Commonly used indicators to judge the severity of illness include:
  - Continuous fever for longer than 1 month
  - Body-weight loss of more than 10%
  - Intense night sweats that persist for more than 3 weeks
  - Infiltrates that involve more than half of one lung or portions of both lungs
  - Prominent or persistent hilar adenopathy
  - Anticoccidioidal complement fixation IgG titers of 1:16 or higher
  - Absence of dermal hypersensitivity to coccidioidal antigens
  - Inability to work
  - Symptoms that persist for more than 2 months
- Risk factors for dissemination (for which treatment should be initiated):
  - Primary infection during infancy
  - Primary infection during pregnancy, especially in the third trimester or immediately post partum
  - Immunosuppression (e.g., patients with HIV/AIDS, transplant recipients, patients receiving high-dose corticosteroids, those receiving antitumor necrosis factor medications)
  - Chronic debilitation or underlying disease, including diabetes mellitus or preexisting cardiopulmonary disease
  - High inoculum exposures
  - Certain ethnicities, such as Filipino, Black, or Hispanic

=== Azoles ===
The introduction of azoles revolutionized treatment for coccidioidomycosis, and these agents are usually the first line of therapy. However, none of these azoles are safe to use in pregnancy and lactation because they have shown teratogenicity in animal studies.

Of the azoles, ketoconazole is the only one approved by the U.S. Food and Drug Administration (FDA) for treatment of coccidioidomycosis. Nevertheless, although it was initially used in the long-term treatment of nonmeningeal extrapulmonary disease, more-potent, less-toxic triazoles (fluconazole and itraconazole) have replaced it. Itraconazole (400 mg/day) appears to have efficacy equal to that of fluconazole in the treatment of nonmeningeal infection and have the same relapse rate after therapy is discontinued. However, itraconazole seems to perform better in skeletal lesions, whereas fluconazole performs better in pulmonary and soft tissue infection. Serum levels of itraconazole are commonly obtained at the onset of long-term therapy because its absorption is sometimes erratic and unpredictable. Complications can include hepatic dysfunction. For patients who are unresponsive to fluconazole, options are limited. Several case reports have studied the efficacy of three newer antifungal agents in the treatment of disease that is refractory to first-line therapy: posaconazole and voriconazole (triazole compounds similar in structure to fluconazole) and caspofungin (glucan synthesis inhibitor of the echinocandin structural class). However, these drugs have not been FDA approved, and clinical trials are lacking. Susceptibility testing of Coccidioides species in one report revealed uniform susceptibility to most antifungal agents, including these newer drugs.

In very severe cases, combination therapy with amphotericin B and an azole have been postulated, although no trials have been conducted. Caspofungin in combination with fluconazole has been cited as beneficial in a case report of a 31-year-old Asian patient with coccidioidal pneumonia. In a case report of a 23-year-old Black male with HIV and coccidioidal meningitis, combination therapy of amphotericin B and posaconazole led to clinical improvement.

Posaconazole has been approved by the European Commission as a salvage therapy for refractory coccidioidomycosis. Clinical trials are now ongoing for further evaluation. Voriconazole is also being studied in salvage therapy for refractory cases. A case report indicated that voriconazole in combination with amphotericin B as salvage therapy for disseminated coccidioidomycosis was successful.

Several case reports have studied caspofungin, with differing results. Caspofungin 50 mg/day following administration of amphotericin B in a patient with acute pulmonary coccidioidomycosis who had undergone transplantation showed promising results. In a patient with disseminated coccidioidomycosis, first-line therapy with amphotericin B and caspofungin alone failed to elicit a response, but the patient was then given caspofungin combined with fluconazole, with good results. A published report described a patient with disseminated and meningeal coccidioidomycosis in whom conventional therapy with fluconazole, voriconazole, and amphotericin B failed; caspofungin 50 mg/day after a loading dose of 70 mg intravenously was also unsuccessful.

=== Amphotericin ===
Amphotericin B, introduced in 1957, remains the treatment of choice for severe infections. It is usually reserved for worsening disease or lesions located in vital organs such as the spine. It can be administered either in the classic amphotericin B deoxycholate formulation or as a lipid formulation. No studies have directly compared amphotericin B with azole therapy. Complications include renal toxicity, bone marrow toxicity, and local systemic effects (fever, rigors).

=== Duration of therapy and costs ===
The objectives of treatment are resolution of infection, decrease of antibody titers, return of function of involved organs, and prevention of relapse. The duration of therapy is dictated by the clinical course of the illness, but it should be at least 6 months in all patients and often a year or longer in others. Therapy is tailored based on a combination of resolution of symptoms, regression of radiographic abnormalities, and changes in CF IgG titers. Immunocompromised patients and patients with a history of meningeal involvement require lifelong treatment.

The cost of antifungal therapy is high, from $5,000 to $20,000 per year. These costs increase for critical patients in need of intensive care. Arizona spent an average of $33,762 per patient with coccidioidomycosis between 1998 and 2001.

== HHS select agents listing ==
Along with C. posadasii, C. immitis was featured on the select agents and toxins list compiled by the U.S. Department of Health and Human Services (HHS), as evident from the Code of Federal Regulations (42 CFR 73). However, on October 5, 2012, due to advances in medical research and development of a number of licensed treatments, both pathogens were removed from the HHS select agents listing.
