= Nannizziopsis guarroi =

Scientific classification
- Kingdom: Fungi
- Division: Ascomycota
- Class: Eurotiomycetes
- Order: Onygenales
- Family: Nannizziopsidaceae
- Genus: Nannizziopsis
- Species: N. guarroi

Binomial name
- Nannizziopsis guarroi (J. Cabañes & Abarca) J. Cabañes, Abarca, Guarro, Stchigel, & Cano (2013)

Synonyms
- Chrysosporium guarroi J. Cabañes & Abarca (2010)

Species of fungus

Nannizziopsis guarroi was first documented in 2006 on a variety of lizards then described in Spain in 2010 and was classified as Chrysosporium guarroi, a member of the anamorphic genus Chrysosporium in the family Onygenaceae. Etymologically, the species epithet "guarroi" honours Professor Josep Guarro in recognition of his extensive mycological work including on the genus Chrysosporium. Skin samples taken from pet green iguanas suffering from dermatomycosis were sent to a laboratory for analysis. Five species were isolated and morphologic studies identified the fungus causing the mycoses as a member of the anamorphic species of Chrysosporium. Further investigation of these species using a combination of morphological, cultural and molecular studies showed that they were not identical to any previously described species within the genus Chrysosporium so they were classified as a new species Chrysosporium guarroisp. nov. The delineation of species in the genus Chrysosporium and their assignment to higher taxonomic levels can be challenging due to the marked morphological simplicity of these fungi. Increased scrutiny of strains of these fungi using molecular genetic tools has revealed numerous hidden species and unexpected relationships.

In 2013, Stchigel et al. conducted phenotypic and phylogenetic studies on a set of veterinary fungi identified in GenBank including the five strains which were previously isolated from iguanas (Spain) and described as Chrysosporium guarroi, one isolated from a snake (US), one from a lizard (US), two from bearded dragons (US) and one from a human (US). It was found that these species as well as others previously classified as members of the genus Chrysosporium in the family Onygenaceae formed a distinct lineage. This finding led to the proposal of a new family Nannizziopsiaceae in the order of Onygenales. Members of this family are known to cause skin mycoses in reptiles with isolated colonies that have pungent skunk-like odors. Other special features of the family Nannizziopsiaceae is their ability to grow at temperatures from 15–37 °C, forming small, hyaline, conidia called arthroconidia and aleurioconidia. Their aleurioconidia and arthroconidia are usually 1-celled; however, rarely the latter might be 2- to 5-celled and are borne at the ends of smooth-walled long narrow stalked conidiophores. Additionally, it was thought that each species of Nannizziopsis was associated with specific hosts but that was not proven to be true according to Stchigel since N. guarroi infected lizards, snakes and even immunocompromised humans.

== Taxonomy ==
Early morphological studies of the fungi strains isolated from pet green iguanas from various geographical locations of Spain provided compelling evidence that they were members of the anamorphic genus Chrysosporium belonging to the family Onygenaceae. In fact, using the maximum-likelihood tree method, the Chrysosporium species to which the five isolates showed the greatest similarity was the Chrysosporium anamorph of Nannizziopsis vriesii (CANV). CANV was first described as Rollinda vriesii in 1970 and later named "CANV" by Currah in 1985 and has also been known historically to causes cutaneous mycosis and systematic infections in several species of reptiles such as lizards, chameleons, bearded dragons and snakes. The five strains identified using the GenBank strains were:

- CH10 [CBS 124553]T (Barcelona, Spain 2006)
- CH11 (Barcelona, Spain 2007)
- CH14 (Barcelona, Spain 2008)
- CH15 (Valladolid, Spain 2008)
- CH16 (Madrid, Spain 2009)

Studies in 2010 of the molecular structure and phenotype of these strains showed that while they were morphologically very similar to the anamorphic genus Chrysosporium, they were actually very different. They were classified as a new species Chrysosporium guarroi sp.nov. in the family Onygenaceae and the order of Onygenales. Further phylogenetic studies of the five isolates and strains of CANV by Stchigel and colleagues in 2010 using MEGA 5.05 with maximum likelihood algorithm and bootstrap analysis demonstrated that CANV and its relative species were within an order characterized by a unique lineage. This led to them being classified as a new family Nannizziopsiaceae in the order of Onygenales resulting in the previously described Chrysosporium guarroi being named Nannizziopsis guarroi.

== Growth and morphology ==
Nannizziopsis guarroi produces slow-growing white to yellowish powdery dense colonies of diameter 17–22 mm with raised centers and reverse side cream to yellow orange when grown in cultures for 14 days. Its optimal growth temperature was observed to be 30–35 °C producing conidia which were indistinguishable under a microscope. These were mostly 1-celled condia borne at the ends of long narrow stalks which are thin- and smooth-walled. These conidia were classified into two distinct categories, namely the aleurioconidia which were not abundant and the arthroconidia which were formed from the fragmentation of hyphae and was the dominant strain produced under certain conditions. Teleomorphs of this species are not easily formed.

== Physiology ==
Growth of N. guarroi was observed at temperatures ranging from 15–37 °C with optimal growth noted at 30–35 °C. On bromocresol purple-milk solids-glucose (BCP-MS-G) agar no hydrolysis was observed for all species with the exception of N. guarroi UTHSC R-4317 (the species affecting humans). On BCP-MS-G agar alkalisation was observed for all strains whereas acidification was not. All strains produced hemolysis on blood agar and showed lipolytic activity, the four strains associated with reptile dermatomycosis showed no growth on sabouraud dextrose agar (SDA) with 3% NaCl and on SDA with 5% NaCl growth was scarce. All strains showed good tolerance towards cycloheximide and growth at 15 °C but growth was scarce at 40 °C for four strains.

== Habitat and ecology ==
Nannizziopsis guarroi has been found in various geographic locations in Spain and the US. These fungi have been found to be the etiologic agents in several cases of reported dermatomycosis in mostly reptiles and isolated cases of immunocompromised humans. These fungi were first recognized as causative agents of reptile disease in the early 2000s. It is therefore unclear as to what could have caused their presumed recent growth and affinity for zoological and human hosts. Climate change has been suggested as one possible contributor to the emergence of disease; however, it is likely that historical infections existed but were ignored or misidentified.

== Pathogenicity in reptiles ==
Nannizziopsis guarroi causes a skin infection mostly in reptiles which can progress to the subcutaneous layers and deeper tissues resulting in the death if not quickly identified and treated. Treatment options usually involves the application of topical agents such as ketoconazole, itraconazole or terbinafine combined with the removal of infected tissues or even amputation in severe cases. Another treatment that appears to show some efficacy in treating both reptile and human infections is voriconazole. The factors that lead to the susceptibility of these animals to fungal skin infections are unknown but have been suggested to involve diet and living conditions or habitat.
