= Uncinocarpus queenslandicus =

Scientific classification
- Domain: Eukaryota
- Kingdom: Fungi
- Division: Ascomycota
- Class: Eurotiomycetes
- Order: Onygenales
- Family: Onygenaceae
- Genus: Uncinocarpus
- Species: U. queenslandicus

Binomial name
- Uncinocarpus queenslandicus (Apinis & R.G. Rees) Sigler (1998)

Synonyms
- Apinisa queenslandica Apinis & R.G. Rees (1976); Amauroascus queenslandicus (Apinis & R.G. Rees) M. Solé, Cano & Guarro (2002)

Species of fungus

Uncinocarpus queenslandicus is a species of microfungi that grows in soil and keratinous materials, such as hair. It was the fourth species to be designated as part of the genus Uncinocarpus. Its name is derived from the Australian state of Queensland, where it was first isolated.

== Taxonomy ==
Three synonyms for U. queenslandicus were first described in 1976 by A.E. Apinis and R.G. Rees as Apinisa queenslandicus during a survey of keratinous soil fungi in Queensland, Australia. Indian mycologists Banani Sur and Gouri R. Ghosh first described Orromyces spiralis in 1985 during a survey of keratinophilic soil fungi. In 1987, Spanish mycologists J. Guarro, L. Punsola and J. Cano first described Byssonygena reticulata as the type species of a new genus.

Canadian mycologists Lynne Sigler, Arlene Flis and J.W. Carmichael first proposed that all three of these species be placed in the genus Uncinocarpus in 1998. Though crossings between these three species and U. queenslandicus were either unsuccessful, or not performed in the case of O. spiralis they based their decision on each of the species' morphological similarities to U. orissi, as well as their ability to degrade keratin, a characteristic feature of Uncinocarpus.

== Description ==
In culture on potato yeast extract, colonies of U. queenslandicus are yellowish white in colour before darkening to a tan or light brown. Colonies take on a velvety to cottony texture. It produces the enzyme urease, allowing it to convert urea to ammonia and carbon dioxide. U. queenslandicus possesses appendages that are loosely or irregularly spiraled.
