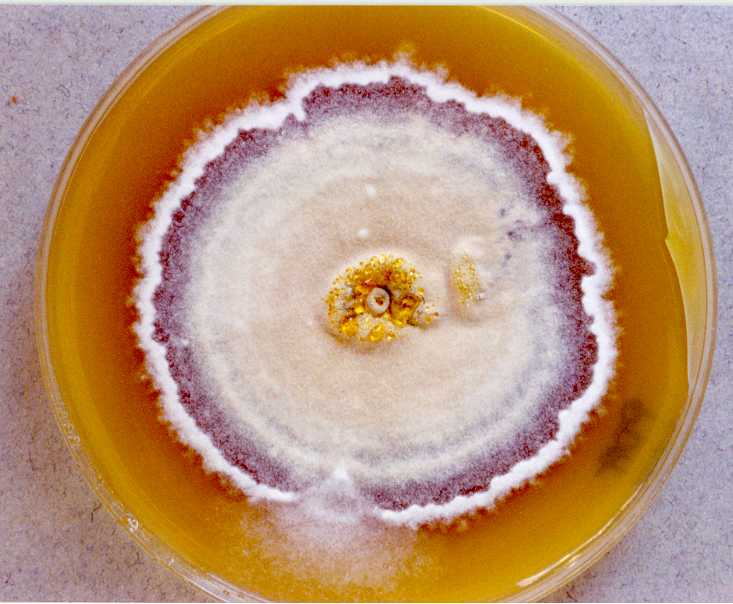

Scientific classification
- Kingdom: Fungi
- Division: Ascomycota
- Class: Eurotiomycetes
- Order: Onygenales
- Family: Onygenaceae
- Genus: Chlamydosauromyces; Sigler, Hambleton & Paré (2002)
- Species: C. punctatus

Binomial name
- Chlamydosauromyces punctatus Sigler, Hambleton & Paré (2002)

= Chlamydosauromyces =

Genus of fungi

Chlamydosauromyces punctatus is the sole species in the monotypic genus of fungi, Chlamydosauromyces in the family, Onygenaceae. It was found in the skin shed from frilled lizard. This fungus is mesophilic and digests hair. It reproduces both sexually and asexually. The fungus has so far not been reported to be pathogenic.

== Growth and reproduction ==
Colonies of C. punctatus are yellow in the center and relatively flat surface at the pale peripherals with a central bump. This fungus is mesophile and grows at 30 °C (86 °F), but does not grow above 35 °C (95 °F). This fungus also shows digestion of hairs after 14 days in vitro. The keratinolytic, or keratin-digesting, capability is one of the characteristics of Onygenaceae. It is also cycloheximide resistant. C. punctatus can reproduce both in sexual and asexual forms. The teleomorph phase is gymnothecial and arises through a homothallic mating system. Ascomata of this species are round, 200–600 μm in diameter containing asci 7–9 (10) μm in length. Ascospores are yellow, 4–4.5 × 3–3.5 μm in diameter. The ascospores look like pitted smarties or pulley wheels, which is characteristics of Onygenaceae. Chlamydosauromyces punctatus has branched, narrow, smooth-walled, yellow hyphae, 1.5–2.5 μm in width with thin-walled septa. Peripheral hyphae are poorly differentiated and this is the reason that C. punctatus was once considered in the Gymnoascaceae. Ascomata lack elongate appendages. The cells initiating anastomosis are slightly swollen.

== Taxonomy ==
Chlamydosauromyces is a monotypic genus, which has only single species in the family, Onygenaceae. However, it was initially thought to be affiliated with the family Gymnoascaceae because it possesses ascospores with equatorial grooves, a common feature of the Gymnoascaceae not normally found in the Onygenaceae. hypha As well, hyphae of this species are sparsely differentiated similar to those of the genus Arachniotus (Gymnoascaceae). Molecular genetic analyses demonstrated the affiliation of this fungus to the Onygenaceae. The genus Chlamydosauromyces was named after the frilled lizard, Chlamydosaurus kingii and the species epithet 'punctatus' was selected in reference to the pitted ornamentation of the ascospores. The name Chlamydosauromyces punctatus is a Latin masculine name.

Small subunit (SSU) region in the nuclear ribosomal gene of C. punctatus is 1,738 nucleotides in length. Phylogenic study based on the sequence have shown Renispora flavissima to be the closest related taxon. Both are treated within the Ongenaceae and share similar characteristics such as the yellow color, thin walls, narrow ascomata, and ascospores with pitted walls. Even though these two species are the most closely related to each other, the bootstrap value was low (78%), indicating that the phylogenic similarity is not particularly high. In addition to the phylogenic distance, there are notable morphological differences between the genus Chlamydosauromyces and Renispora. the hyphae of Chlamydosauromyces are subhyaline whereas those of Renispora are hyaline or translucent. Moreover, Renispora has liver-shaped ascospores, but ascospores of Chlamydosauromyces look like pulley wheels. In addition to the morphological differences between two species of fungi, the conidia of the Chrysosporium anamorph of Renispora are large with spiny tubercules and formed on stalks whereas Chlamydosauromyces produces an asexual state characterized by alternate arthroconidia.

== Ecology ==
Chlamydosauromyces punctatus was first found in the putatively healthy Squamate reptiles free of cutaneous lesions. The fungus was first isolated in 2001 from the shed skin of a 7-year-old healthy male frilled lizard, Chlamydosaurus kingii, from the San Diego Zoo (the lizard typically lives in trees found in the northern part of the Australia). Among samples of three different Squamate reptiles donated by the Zoo, the skin samples of two of the reptile species did not show any evidence of invasion by the fungus. The ex-type strain of C. punctatus is in depository at UAMH 9990. Though unique to reptiles, this species is distinct from the commonly associated fungal pathogens of reptiles. C. punctatus is associated with the shed skin of healthy lizards free of lesions or symptoms.
