= Polytolypa =

Scientific classification
- Kingdom: Fungi
- Division: Ascomycota
- Class: Eurotiomycetes
- Order: Onygenales
- Family: Ajellomycetaceae
- Genus: Polytolypa; J.A.Scott & Malloch (1993)

Type species
- Polytolypa hystricis J.A.Scott & Malloch (1993)

Genus of fungi

Polytolypa is a monotypic genus of fungus containing the single species Polytolypa hystricis. First classified in the Onygenaceae family, as of 2008 it is considered to be in the Ajellomycetaceae, although there is still uncertainty as to its phylogenetic relationships with other similar genera. This species is only known from a single specimen derived in the laboratory from a specimen of dung of the North American porcupine, Erethizon dorsatum, collected in Ontario, Canada. Polytolypa hystricis contains bioactive compounds that have antifungal activity.

== Taxonomy, phylogeny, and naming ==
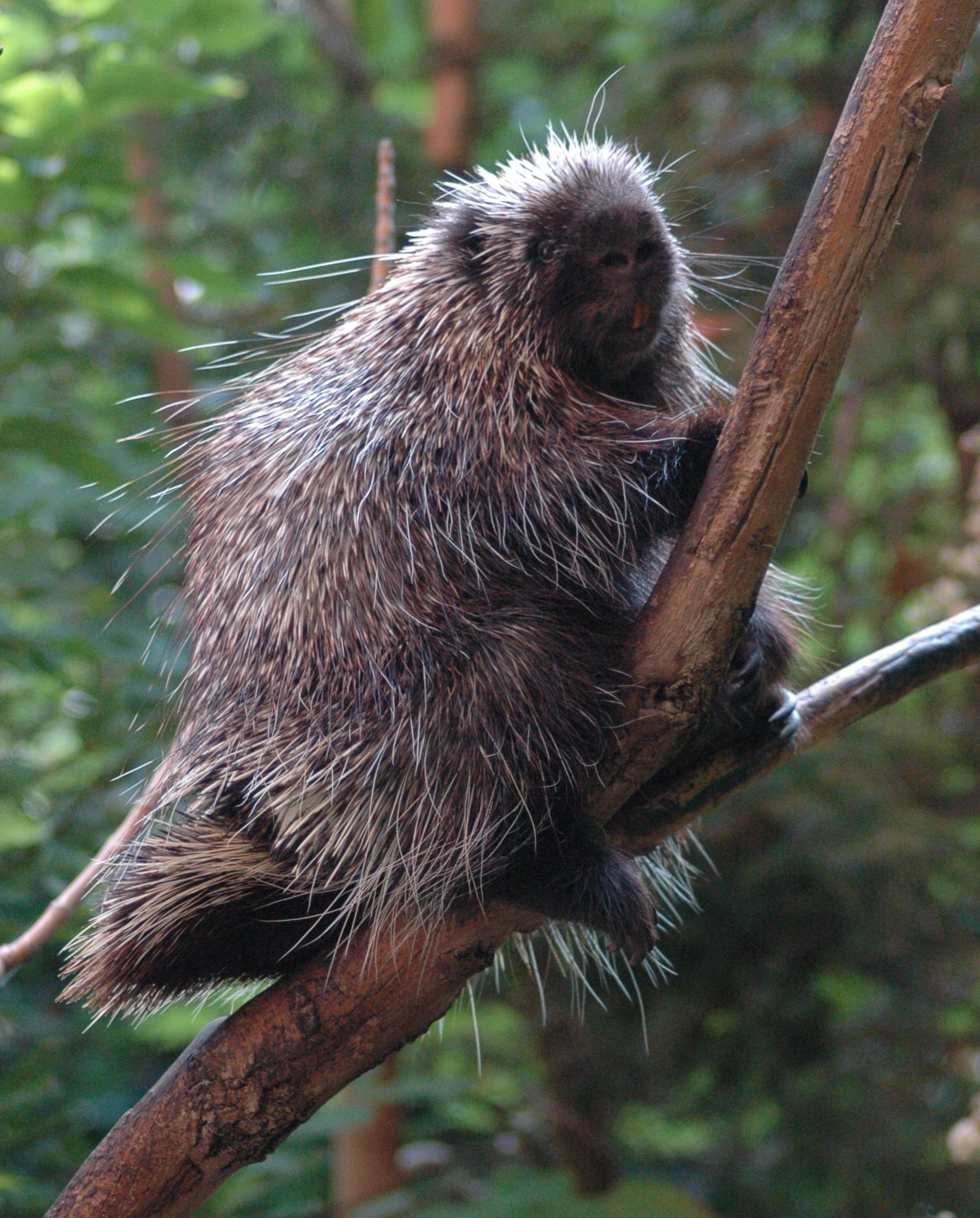
Polytolypa hystricis was initially grown from the dung of the North American porcupine, Erethizon dorsatum (pictured).

The genus was first described in 1993 by University of Toronto mycologists J.A. Scott and D.W. Malloch, who grew the fungus in moist chamber cultures of porcupine dung collected in Stoneleigh, Ontario, Canada. The generic name Polytolypa is from the Greek word poly (πολυ) meaning "many", and tolype (τολυπη), meaning "skein of yarn". The specific epithet hystricis comes from the Greek hystrix (υστριξ), or "porcupine".

The genus has been classified in the Onygenaceae, a fungal family characterized by species capable of digesting human hair in vitro, and with spores that are punctate (with minute surface punctures) when viewed with scanning electron microscopy. However, as Scott and colleagues demonstrated using traditional laboratory tests to determine keratinolytic activity, P. hystricus is not able to digest hair. There is still uncertainty as to its phylogenetic relationships with other similar genera. Polytolypa is thought to be evolutionarily most closely related to the genera Malbranchea and Spiromastix. The grouping of Polytolypa and Spiromastix represent a sister clade to the Ajellomyces clade, based on analysis of partial nuclear LSU sequence data. However, the phylogenetics of Polytolypa are still unclear and await further study. The 10th edition of the Dictionary of the Fungi (2008) considers the genus to be in the Ajellomycetaceae family, although uncertainty with this classification is indicated in the entry; in contrast, the online mycological database MycoBank classifies the genus in the Onygenaceae.

== Description ==
The ascus-containing reproductive structures, or ascomata, are minute, spherical bodies, typically 200–400 μm in diameter. They start out white, but gradually become rusty brown in maturity. The ascomata, which may be clustered together in groups or scattered about, grow in a shallow layer of "hairs" (actually fungal mycelia) called a tomentum. The ascomata have "appendages" composed of numerous coiled, sometimes branched helices of hyphae that are coiled 3–15 times.

The ascospores produced by Polytolypa are ellipsoidal, yellow to yellow-orange in color, with dimensions of 2.5–5 by 3–4 μm. Viewed with a light microscope their surfaces appear to be smooth, but under scanning electron microscopy, they are revealed to be densely marked with punctures and small, hard, sharp projections. The structures that produce the ascospores are called asci. In Polytolypa they are numerous, spherical, and measure 9–10 by 12–13 μm. Each ascus contains eight ascospores, which are released when the ascus dissolves away at maturity. The anamorph (asexual form of the fungus) resembles the genus Chrysosporium.

== Habitat and distribution ==
Polytolypa hystricis is known only from the dung of the North American porcupine, Erethizon dorsatum. Porcupine dens accumulate thick layers of nutrient-rich dung, hair and urine that are degraded by a succession of fungi. These fungi are disseminated by arthropods (such as insects) or by the porcupine themselves.

== Bioactive compounds ==
Chemical analysis has shown that Polytolypa hystricis contains a unique triterpenoid chemical named polytolypin, as well two compounds known previously as metabolites from Scleroderris Canker (Gremmeniella abietina). Both polytolypin and one of the previously identified compounds have "moderate" antifungal activity against the species Ascobolus furfuraceous, while polytopin alone can inhibit the growth of Candida albicans.

== See also ==
- Coprophilous fungi
