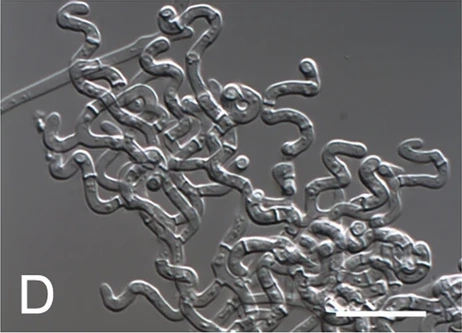
- A. bostrychodes reproductive hyphae separating into arthroconidia

Scientific classification
- Kingdom: Fungi
- Division: Ascomycota
- Class: Eurotiomycetes
- Order: Arachnomycetales; Gibas, Sigler & Currah (2022)
- Family: Arachnomycetaceae; Gibas, Sigler & Currah (2022)
- Genus: Arachnomyces; Massee & E.S. Salmon (1902)

Type species
- Arachnomyces nitidus Massee & E.S. Salmon (1902)

Species
- A. bostrychodes; A. flavidulus; A. glareosus; A. graciliformis; A. gracilis; A. jinanicus; A. kanei; A. minimus; A. minutus; A. nitidus; A. nodosetosus; A. peruvianus; A. pilosus; A. scleroticus; A. sulphureus; A. validus

Synonyms
- Onychocola Sigler (1990)

= Arachnomyces =

Genus of fungi

Arachnomyces is a genus of cleistothecial ascomycete fungi described in 1902, of which the anamorph (asexual) stage is the genus Onychocola. Although morphologically similar to members of other families, the fungus now belongs to its own monotypic family Arachnomycetaceae, which is the only family in the monotypic order Arachnomycetales.

== Phylogeny ==
The placement of Arachnomyces has changed multiple times due to its morphological similarities to members of different families. When first described in 1902, it was included in the old family Perisporiaceae. Later it was considered as part of Onygenaceae, then it was placed within the Gymnoascaceae in 1996. Thanks to phylogenetic analyses Arachnomyces is currently recognized as a distinct monophyletic lineage, composing its own family Arachnomycetaceae and order Arachnomycetales within the class Eurotiomycetes.

Phylogeny in 2019

- - - - - A. peruvianum
        - - - A. minimus
            - A. scleroticus
          - A. glareosus
      - - A. pilosus
        - A. gracilis
    - A. kanei
  - - A. jinanicus
    - A. nodosetosus
  - A. nitidus

Phylogeny in 2021

- - - - A. gracilis
      - A. pilosus
    - - - - A. minimus
          - A. glareosus
        - - - A. graciliformis
            - - - A. nitidus
                - A. bostrychodes
              - A. scleroticus
          - A. peruvianum
      - A. kanei
  - - - O. canadensis
    - A. jinanicus

== Taxonomy ==
There are currently 16 accepted species of Arachnomyces.

- Arachnomyces bostrychodes Rodr.-Andr., Cano & Stchigel 2021
- Arachnomyces flavidulus Speg. 1912
- Arachnomyces glareosus Gibas, Sigler & Currah 2004
- Arachnomyces graciliformis Rodr.-Andr., Stchigel & Cano 2021
- Arachnomyces gracilis Udagawa & Uchiy. 1999
- Arachnomyces jinanicus B.D.Sun, Y.G.Zhou & A.J.Chen 2019
- Arachnomyces kanei Gibas, Sigler & Summerb. 2002 (anamorph Onychocola kanei)
- Arachnomyces minimus Malloch & Cain 1970
- Arachnomyces minutus N.Singh & Mukerji 1978
- Arachnomyces nitidus Massee & E.S.Salmon 1902
- Arachnomyces nodosetosus Sigler & S.P.Abbott 1994 (anamorph Onychocola canadensis)
- Arachnomyces peruvianus (Cain 1957) Malloch & Cain 1970 [=Anixiopsis peruviana Cain 1957; =Xanthothecium peruvianum von Arx & Samson 1973]
- Arachnomyces pilosus (Gené, Guarro & Ulfig) B.D.Sun, Houbraken & A.J.Chen 2019 [=Chrysosporium pilosus Gené, Guarro & Ulfig 1994]
- Arachnomyces scleroticus (Guarro, Gené & De Vroey) B.D.Sun, Houbraken & A.J.Chen 2019 [=Malbranchea sclerotica Guarro, Gene & De Vroey, 1993; =Onychocola sclerotica (Guarro, Gené & De Vroey) Gibas, Sigler et Currah, 2002]
- Arachnomyces sulphureus Massee & E.S.Salmon 1902
- Arachnomyces validus N.Singh & Mukerji 2002
