= Auxarthron californiense =

Scientific classification
- Kingdom: Fungi
- Division: Ascomycota
- Class: Eurotiomycetes
- Order: Onygenales
- Family: Onygenaceae
- Genus: Auxarthron
- Species: A. californiense

Binomial name
- Auxarthron californiense G.F. Orr, Kuehn H.H (1963)

Synonyms
- Gymnoascus californiensis Apinis, A.E. (1964)

Species of fungus

Auxarthron californiense is a fungus within the family Onygenaceae family and one of the type species of the genus Auxarthron . A. californiense is generally distributed around the world and it is frequently found on dung and in soil near the entrances of animal burrows.

== History and taxonomy ==
As one of the first species selected in the genus Auxarthron, A. californiense was first isolated from pack rat dung in 1963, at California. The genus Auxarthron was erected by Orr and Kuehn to accommodate species with swollen septa of the peridial hyphae, formerly classified in genus of Gymnoascus. However, both Apinis(1964) did not accept this new genus, because they could also observe swollen septa in other species of Gymnoascus. Although this feature may not be significant for distinguishing new genera, the genus Auxarthron could also be identified on the basis of the presence of wall thickenings in the vicinity of septa which they called "knuckle joints". The genus Auxarthron is related to Amauroascus and Arachnotheca, but differs from these two genera in possessing dark ascomata with distinct appendages. In 1965, this taxon was examined on cellophane buried in calcareous fen soil and on bird dung.

== Growth and morphology ==
Colonies grown at freezing agar are at first white, then yellow, tan to yellow-brown and granular. then the colonies turn powdery. Colonies grow slowly on YpSs agar and become umbonate in center. The color of the colonies are often brownish and the reverse is reddish-brown in center to yellowish at the margins. This restricted, granular appearance with a reddish-brown reverse colony makes it distinguished from other species in the genus. Cylindrical or oblong conidia are produced in asexual reproduction. Conidia are pale yellow-orange, smooth to slightly rugose. Both intercalary and apical conidia were observed.

== Appearance ==
Ascomata of A. californiense are globose. Young ascomata are rosy, and turn orange-brown at maturity. Ascospores are oblate and they have a pale yellow-brown color. This punctate ascospores appears broadly around the colony, forming a reticulate structure. The peridial hyphae of A. californiense also have a pale orange-brown color. These septate peridial hyphae are asperulate and cuticularized. A loose network appears with all the peridial hyphae together. A. californiense have uncinate appendages. Different from other species in the genus, the appendages of A. californiense are arise at odd angles from the ascocarps. In other species, the appendages are projecting forth at right angles. A. californiense is similar to Uncinocarpus uncinatus, in having thick-walled appendages that are hooked at the tip. However, the crozier-shaped tips of A. californiense have an acute end while the tips of U. uncinatus have a blunt and parallel end.

== Habitat and ecology ==
Auxarthron species, like most Onygenaceae, have usually been isolated from strongly anthropized soil, enriched with human or animal keratinaceous remnants. The genus Auxarthron is considered as keratinolytic on the basis of hair perforation studies. However, the keratin degradative ability was not found in the specie A. californiense, different from other species in the genus. By Phylogenetic studies, this absence of keratinolytic ability shows that during the course of evolution the keratinolytic ability of Auxarthron genus is decreasing. In 1998, A. californiense was isolated on the veil, tunic and wood fragments on the remains of a ninth century Longobard abbess at Pavia, Italy. The presence of A. californiense in this habitat indicates that A. californiense might be able to utilize some of the nutrients in human decomposing substances.
