= Chrysosporium longisporum =

Scientific classification
- Kingdom: Fungi
- Division: Ascomycota
- Class: Eurotiomycetes
- Order: Onygenales
- Family: Onygenaceae
- Genus: Chrysosporium
- Species: C. longisporum

Binomial name
- Chrysosporium longisporum Stchigel et al., 2013

Species of fungus

Chrysosporium longisporum is a keratinophilic microfungus in the family Onygenaceae that causes skin infections in reptiles, producing hyaline, thin-walled, small, sessile conidia and colonies with a strong skunk-like odour.
