= Apinisia graminicola =

Scientific classification
- Domain: Eukaryota
- Kingdom: Fungi
- Division: Ascomycota
- Class: Eurotiomycetes
- Order: Onygenales
- Family: Onygenaceae
- Genus: Apinisia
- Species: A. graminicola

Binomial name
- Apinisia graminicola La Touche

Species of fungus

Apinisia graminicola is a species of fungus. It has been observed as the cause of a leaf disease in Miscanthus × giganteus, a common energy crop.
