= Uncinocarpus uncinatus =

Scientific classification
- Domain: Eukaryota
- Kingdom: Fungi
- Division: Ascomycota
- Class: Eurotiomycetes
- Order: Onygenales
- Family: Onygenaceae
- Genus: Uncinocarpus
- Species: U. uncinatus

Binomial name
- Uncinocarpus uncinatus R.S. Currah (1985)

Synonyms
- Myxotrichum uncinatum Currah (1985); Gymnoascus uncinatus Currah (1985)

Species of fungus

Uncinocarpus uncinatus is a species of microfungi that grows on dung and other keratinous materials such as bone. It was the second species to be designated as part of the genus Uncinocarpus. The species was first described by Randolph S. Currah in 1985; synonyms include Myxotrichum uncinatum and Gymnoascus uncinatus.

== Morphology ==
In culture, colonies of U. uncinatus are yellow to orange-brown to red-brown in colour, growing paler towards the margin. Like other members of Uncinocarpus, it develops hooked and occasionally spiralling (uncinate) appendages which typically, but not always, possess spore-bearing structures (gymnothecia). The appendages of U. uncinatus are thick and wide to the distal end, unlike that of U. reesii, which taper to a point.
