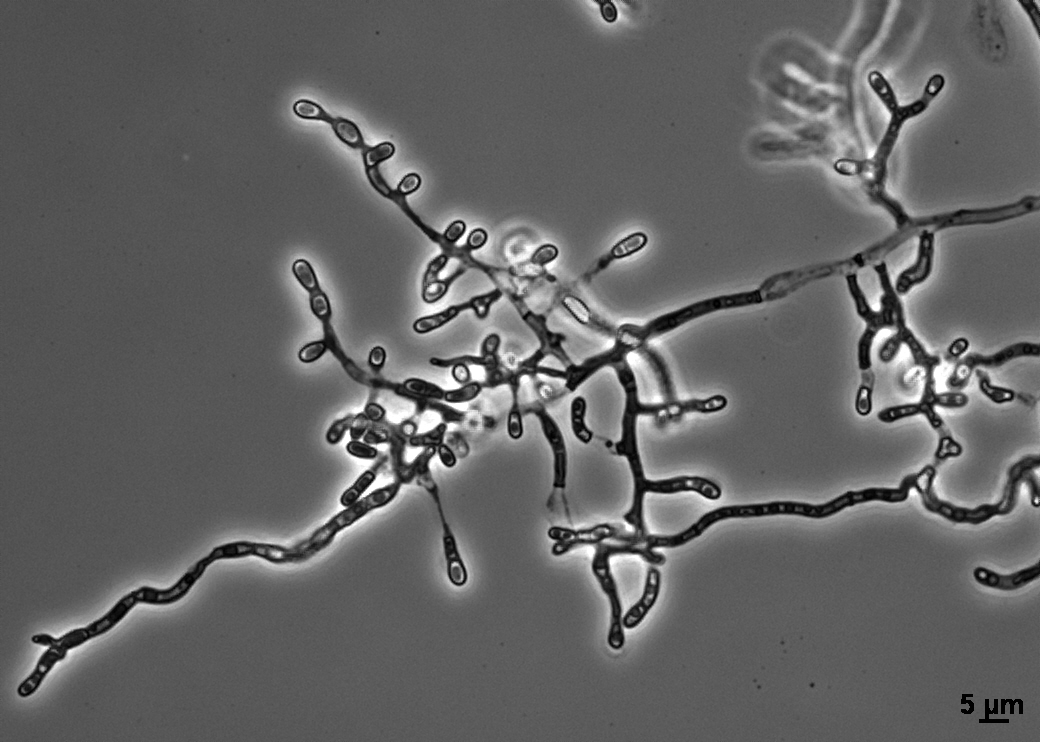
- Hyphae

Scientific classification
- Kingdom: Fungi
- Division: Ascomycota
- Class: Eurotiomycetes
- Order: Onygenales
- Family: Onygenaceae
- Genus: Ophidiomyces; Sigler, Hambl. & Paré (2013)
- Species: O. ophidiicola

Binomial name
- Ophidiomyces ophidiicola (Guarro, Sutton, Wickes & Rajeev) Sigler, Hambleton & Paré (2013)

Synonyms
- Chrysosporium ophiodiicola Guarro, Sutton, Wickes & Rajeev (2009)

= Ophidiomyces =

Species of fungus

Ophidiomyces ophidiicola (formerly Ophidiomyces ophiodiicola) is the cause of ophidiomycosis also known as snake fungal disease or SFD in some species of snakes. It is a keratinophilic fungus from the family Onygenaceae of the order Onygenales. O. ophidiicola is an emerging pathogen of captive and wild snakes in North America and Europe. Clinical signs include skin swelling, crusts, and nodules of the skin. The mode of transmission is unknown, but is speculated to occur with direct contact between snakes or with the contaminated environment. Currently no treatment for O. ophidiicola is available. O. ophidiicola was identified by Sigler, Hambleton & Paré in 2013. O. ophidiicola is the only species in the genus Ophidiomyces. It was previously known as Chrysosporium ophiodiicola and is closely related to Chrysosporium anamorph Nannizziopsis vriesii (CANV).

== Taxonomy and naming ==
Ophidiomyces ophidiicola was first described as Chrysosporium ophiodiicola by Josef Guarro and colleagues in 2009 from infected snakes. Morphologically, the fungus resembled members of the genus Chrysosporium, and was thought to be closely related to the reptile pathogen that had been referred to as the Chrysosporium anamorph Nannizziopsis vriesii (CANV). The genus Ophidiomyces was erected to accommodate this fungus in 2013 when DNA sequencing confirmed it to be a member of the family Onygenaceae but genetically distinct from members of the genus Chrysosporium.

== Culture characteristics ==
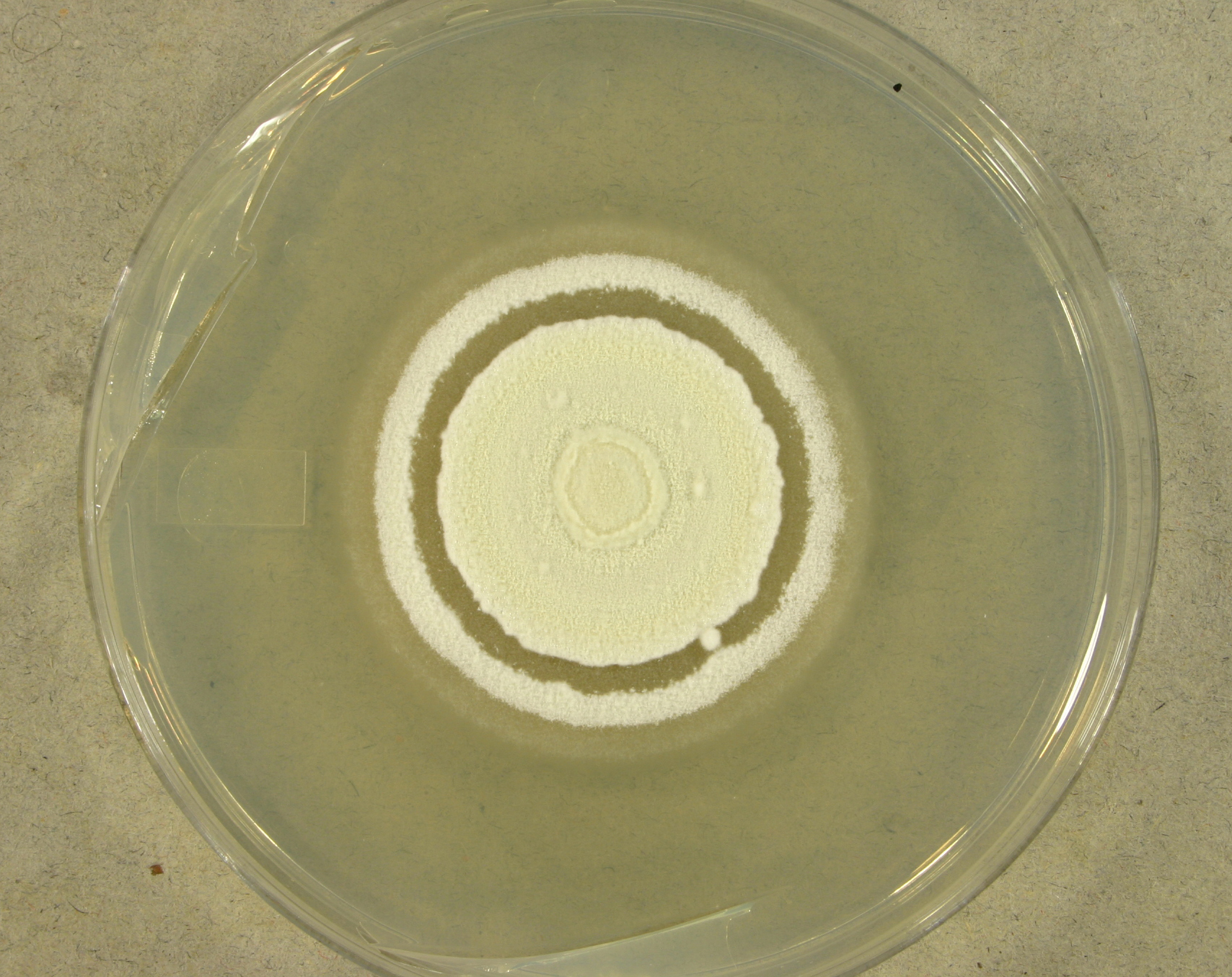
Isolates from Nerodia clarkii

Cultures of O. ophidiicola are powdery with whitish mycelium that becomes light yellowish with age. The cultures emit a pungent, skunk like odour. Optimal growth for O. ophidiicola occurs at a temperature of 25 °C (77 °F). Most isolates fail to grow at 35 °C (95 °F). O. ophidiicola is able to grow over pH range of 5–11 with optimal growth observed at pH of 9. O. ophidiicola is able tolerate matric induced water stress below −5 MPa. The fungus exhibits strong urease activity and produces robust growth on ammonium sulfate, sulfite and thiosulfate.

== Morphology ==
No sexual state has been identified in the fungus O. ophidiicola. Vegetative hyphae of O. ophidiicola are narrow, branched and septate. Occasional racquet mycelia are observed. O. ophidiicola reproduces asexually by the production of conidia. The conidia are produces at the end of short stalks ranging from 2.5 to 7.5 μm in length and 1.5 to 2.5 μm in width. The conidia range from 3 to 12.5 μm long and 1.3 to 3.5 μm wide. and are released by rhexolytic dehiscence in which the walls of cell compartments adjacent to conidia erode, freeing the conidia from attached hyphae. The conidia are colourless to pale yellow and smooth-walled.

== Ecology ==
Ecology of O. ophidiicola is not well known but it is believed that O. ophidiicola persists as an environmental saprobe in soil as well as in living hosts. O. ophidiicola is able to utilize multiple carbon and nitrogen sources, and tolerates a range of pH, naturally occurring sulfur compounds and low matric potential. These are mostly characteristics required to live in soil. Good growth on dead fish, insect, mushroom tissue and demineralized shrimp exoskeleton is observed. O. ophidiicola physiological characteristics indicate that it is capable of growing in numerous ecosystems.

== Clinical symptoms ==
The mode of transmission is unknown, but is speculated to occur with direct contact between individuals or with the contaminated environment. Different symptoms can be seen in different species of snakes. In pit viper species facial swelling, cloudy eyes, improperly shed skin, roughened scales, dermal or subcutaneous granuloma and destruction of venom glands can be seen. In massasaugas O. ophidiicola infection infect deep muscle tissue and bone. Also lesions can be observed on the skin of the entire body. In colubrid species of snake fungal disease is reported to appear as pneumonia, ocular infection and subcutaneous nodules. In garter snakes skin lesions are observed. The infection is reported to be systemic where it affects the lungs, liver and eyes.

== Pathogenicity in snakes ==
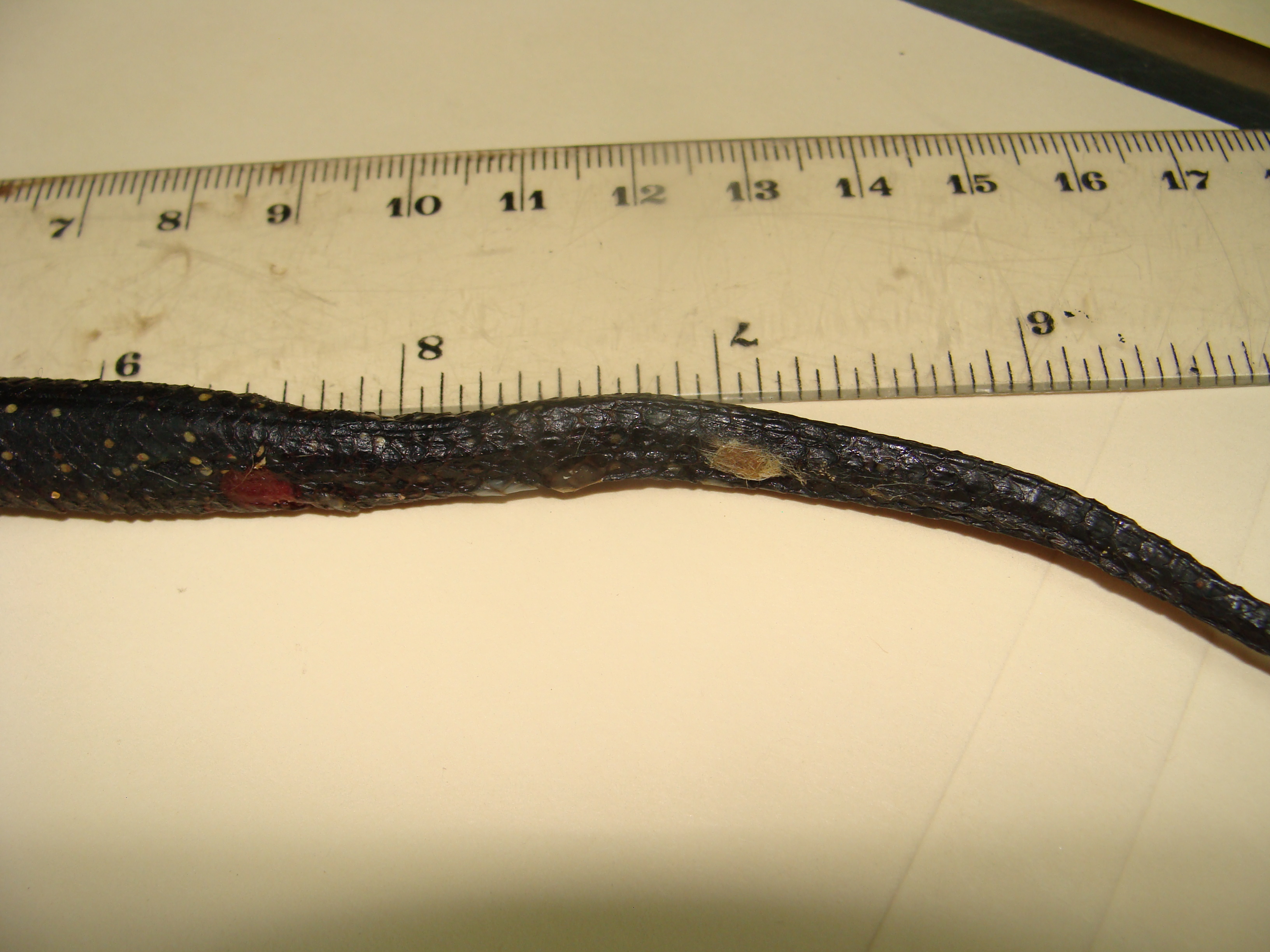
Lesions on Hoplocephalus bungaroides

Infection begins in the outermost layer of the skin, the stratum corneum, and progresses into the epidermis. Once the infection reaches epidermis, the snake's immune response becomes activated and immune cells are recruited at the site of infection, causing the epidermis to become necrotic and thickened after a few days.

Lesions begin at the edge of individual scales and progress to adjacent scales. As lesions progress scales became rough and hyperpigmented. Lesions progressively become larger and more severe until the snake sheds its skin. Fluid-filled vesicles form between the new and old skin resulting in improper shedding of the skin: fragments of the old skin remain on the snake. Histological studies show skin lesions with areas of necrosis and granulocytic inflammation in the superficial to midepidermis. Mild chronic lymphoplasmacytic to lymphohistiocytic inflammation in the liver, lungs, heart, stomach and colon can be observed as well.

The emergence of ophidiomycosis due to O. ophidiicola has caused great concern for the conservation of snake populations in the Eastern United States. Confirmed cases of ophidiomycosis have been reported in 23 states in USA though the disease is believed to be more widespread than has been documented. Multiple species of snakes that are affected including the northern water snake (Nerodia sipedon), eastern racer (Coluber constrictor), rat snake (Pantherophis obsoletus species complex), timber rattlesnake (Crotalus horridus), massasauga (Sistrurus catenatus), pygmy rattlesnake (Sistrurus miliarius), and milk snake (Lampropeltis triangulum). It is reported that population of rattlesnake in New Hampshire reduced to 19 from 40 due to ophidiomycosis caused by O. ophidiicola.

Ophidiomyces ophidiicola has been successfully treated in captive settings using the antifungal drug terbinafine, which has shown to be effective via both nebulization or subcutaneous implant. Such a strategy is impractical for many snake populations because it can be difficult to locate the majority of individuals within the population, is resource intensive, and fails to prevent reinfection. The National Wildlife Health Center along with other organizations and researchers are working together to develop management strategies to mitigate disease impact.
