= Amauroascus kuehnii =

Scientific classification
- Kingdom: Fungi
- Division: Ascomycota
- Class: Eurotiomycetes
- Order: Onygenales
- Family: Onygenaceae
- Genus: Amauroascus
- Species: A. kuehnii

Binomial name
- Amauroascus kuehnii Kuehn (1957)

Synonyms
- Auxarthron kuehnii M. Solé, Cano & Gaurro (2002); Arachniotus reticulatus Kuehn (1957)

Species of fungus

Amauroascus kuehnii is a fungus in the phylum Ascomycota, class Eurotiomycetes. It is keratinophilic but not known to cause any human disease. It has been isolated from animal dungs, soil, and keratinous surfaces of live or deceased animals.

== History and taxonomy ==
A. kuehnii was originally discovered and described by Dr. Harold H. Kuehn in 1957. The specimen was obtained from bat dung collected in Georgia, the United States. It was first assigned Arachnoitus reticulatus given its reticulate ascospores that distinguished it from other species in genus Arachniotus. In 1971, after examining different species from Arachniotus and related genera of Gymnoascaceae on laboratory cultures, Arx separated the genus Amauroascus from Arachniotus due to its spherical and ornamental ascospores, and reclassified Arachniotus reticulatus under genus Amauroascus. Since the epithet reticulatus was already occupied in Amauroascus, this species was named A. kuehnii after its discoverer Dr. H Kuehn. This re-classification was accepted in Currah's review of the order Onygenales, but he also noted the similar morphological characteristics of Amauroascus and Auxarthron. A molecular phylogenetic study conducted in 2002 suggested that Amauroascus kuehnii is likely a species complex, and proposed that it be recombined with Auxarthron pseudoreticulatum as Auxarthron kuehnii. The taxonomy issue is controversial because the species' ascospore phenotype is intermediate between Auxarthron and Amauroascus. The consensus remains that the species belongs under Amauroascus without further studies.

== Growth and morphology ==
=== Teleomorph ===
The sexual form of this fungus produces white spherical dispersed ascomata (cleistothecia), which turn brown as the ascocarps (126-883 μm in diameter) mature. The asci containing 8 ascospores are oval, and around 10-12×7-8 μm in dimension. The spherical, white spores have web-like texture on the surface and are 4-5 μm in diameter. Compared to Amauroascus pseudoreticulatus-patellis which is closely related and has a similar appearance, A. kuehnii has shallower pits on the surface of the spores. Surrounding the ascomata are the peridial hyphae, which appear thin-walled, yellow to pale brown, and septate. In occasion, pigment granules cause the presence of Brown spots.

=== Anamorph ===
In the asexual state, A. kuehnii colonies first appear white, with a raised bump in the centre. Arthroconidia formed from smooth, straight, branched pale white hyphae, are around 2.8-8.4×2-4 μm in dimension. The fungus grows rapidly in culture. On PDA, colonies are white, sparse and delicate. Reverse of the colonies appears pink with occasional black patches. Cleistothecia appear as white tufts at the periphery of the colony and form a yellow crust, which soon spread throughout the colony. On Sabouraud agar, colonies also appears white, sparse and delicate, whereas reverse appears dull red. Cleistothecia change from white to yellow to light brown over time. On CER under 21-25 °C, white or pale yellow cottony colonies form and turn granular in older portions. Reverse of the colonies appears uncoloured. On dilute salt acidic medium (DSA) under 25-28 °C, colonies appear yellow to brown with brown spots adjacent to the hairs. On peptone yeast extract agar (PYE) under 25-35 °C, colonies are yellow, dense and filamentous with a purplish brown centre and white periphery.

== Physiology ==
This species has been recorded to possess a distinctive earthy odour. It secretes extracellular keratinase and is a saprotroph on keratinous debris and soil. The fungus also produces a tube precipitin (TP) antigen which is a glycoprotein shared by the pathogenic fungus Coccidioides immitis.

== Habitat and ecology ==
A. kuehnii is a rare fungus found in North America and Mexico, with a few reports from Europe. Due to the limited available isolates, conclusion of its habitat cannot be drawn. Although it was mostly discovered in lizard or bat dung and keratinous soil, strains have been isolated from keratinous surfaces of animals such as fowl and deer horns. None of the species in Amauroascus is known to be a pathogen of animals, and no strains have been isolated from humans.
