= Nannizziopsis pluriseptata =

Scientific classification
- Kingdom: Fungi
- Division: Ascomycota
- Class: Eurotiomycetes
- Order: Onygenales
- Family: Nannizziopsidaceae
- Genus: Nannizziopsis
- Species: N. pluriseptata

Binomial name
- Nannizziopsis pluriseptata Stchigel et al., 2013

Species of fungus

Nannizziopsis pluriseptata is a keratinophilic microfungus in the order Onygenales that causes skin infections in reptiles, producing hyaline, thin-walled, small, sessile conidia and colonies with a strong skunk-like odour. It is distinguished by its production of 1- to 5-celled sessile conidia.
