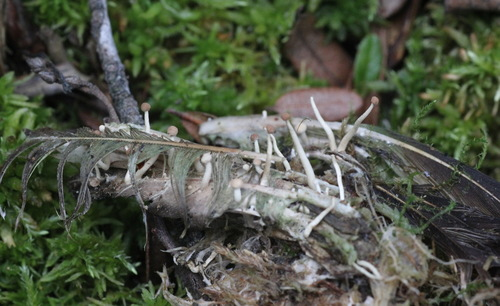

Scientific classification
- Kingdom: Fungi
- Division: Ascomycota
- Class: Eurotiomycetes
- Order: Onygenales
- Family: Onygenaceae
- Genus: Onygena
- Species: O. corvina

Binomial name
- Onygena corvina (Alb. & Schwein.) Pers. (1805)

Synonyms
- Onygena equina var. corvina Alb. & Schwein. (1886); Onygena corvina var. alliacea E. Bommer & M. Rousseau (1887)

= Onygena corvina =

Species of fungi

Onygena corvina is a species of fungus in the genus Onygena sometimes called the feather stalkball. Like other Onygena species, it contains keratin-digesting enzymes and can grow on feathers, hooves, owl pellets, hair and wool.
