= Amauroascus =

Scientific classification
- Kingdom: Fungi
- Division: Ascomycota
- Class: Eurotiomycetes
- Order: Onygenales
- Family: Onygenaceae
- Genus: Amauroascus; J.Schröt. (1893)

Type species
- Amauroascus verrucosus (Eidam) J.Schröt. (1893)

Genus of fungi

Amauroascus is a genus of fungi in the family Onygenaceae. The genus was described by German mycologist Joseph Schröter in 1893, with Amauroascus verrucosus as the type species.

== Species ==
- Amauroascus albicans
- Amauroascus aureus
- Amauroascus burundensis
- Amauroascus cubensis
- Amauroascus desertorum
- Amauroascus javanicus
- Amauroascus kuehnii
- Amauroascus malaysianus
- Amauroascus mutatus
- Amauroascus niger
- Amauroascus oblatus
- Amauroascus purpureus
- Amauroascus tropicalis
- Amauroascus verrucosus
- Amauroascus volatilis-patellis
