= Kuehniella =

Scientific classification
- Kingdom: Fungi
- Division: Ascomycota
- Class: Eurotiomycetes
- Order: Onygenales
- Family: Onygenaceae
- Genus: Kuehniella; G.F. Orr

Type species
- Kuehniella racovitzae (Lagarde) G.F. Orr

Genus of fungi

Kuehniella is a genus of fungi within the Onygenaceae family.

The genus name of Kuehniella is in honour of Harold Hermann Kuehn n (1927 - 1990), who was an American botanist and mycologist.

The genus was circumscribed by G.F. Orr in Mycotaxon vol.4 on page 172 in 1976.
