= Neoarachnotheca =

Scientific classification
- Kingdom: Fungi
- Division: Ascomycota
- Class: Eurotiomycetes
- Order: Onygenales
- Family: Onygenaceae
- Genus: Neoarachnotheca; Ulfig, Cano & Guarro

Type species
- Neoarachnotheca keratinophila Ulfig, Cano & Guarro

Genus of fungi

Neoarachnotheca is a genus of fungi within the Onygenaceae family. This is a monotypic genus, containing the single species Neoarachnotheca keratinophila.
