= Nannizziopsis arthrosporioides =

Scientific classification
- Kingdom: Fungi
- Division: Ascomycota
- Class: Eurotiomycetes
- Order: Onygenales
- Family: Nannizziopsidaceae
- Genus: Nannizziopsis
- Species: N. arthrosporioides

Binomial name
- Nannizziopsis arthrosporioides Stchigel et al., 2013

Species of fungus

Nannizziopsis arthrosporioides is a keratinophilic microfungus in the order Onygenales that causes skin infections in reptiles, producing hyaline, thin-walled, small, sessile conidia and colonies with a strong skunk-like odour. It is distinguished by the production of long arthroconidia.
