= Neogymnomyces =

Scientific classification
- Kingdom: Fungi
- Division: Ascomycota
- Class: Eurotiomycetes
- Order: Onygenales
- Family: Onygenaceae
- Genus: Neogymnomyces; G.F. Orr

Type species
- Neogymnomyces demonbreunii (Ajello & S.L. Cheng) G.F. Orr

Genus of fungi

Neogymnomyces is a genus of fungi within the Onygenaceae family.
