= Auxarthron =

Scientific classification
- Kingdom: Fungi
- Division: Ascomycota
- Class: Eurotiomycetes
- Order: Onygenales
- Family: Onygenaceae
- Genus: Auxarthron; G.F. Orr & Kuehn

Type species
- Auxarthron californiense G.F. Orr & Kuehn

Species
- Auxarthron californiense

Genus of fungi

Auxarthron is a genus of fungi within the Onygenaceae family.
