= Spiromastix =

Scientific classification
- Kingdom: Fungi
- Division: Ascomycota
- Class: Eurotiomycetes
- Order: Onygenales
- Family: Onygenaceae
- Genus: Spiromastix; Kuehn & G.F. Orr

Type species
- Spiromastix warcupii Kuehn & G.F. Orr

Genus of fungi

Spiromastix is a genus of fungi within the Onygenaceae family.
