= Nannizziopsis =

Scientific classification
- Kingdom: Fungi
- Division: Ascomycota
- Class: Eurotiomycetes
- Order: Onygenales
- Family: Nannizziopsidaceae; Guarro, Stchigel, Deanna A.Sutton & Cano
- Genus: Nannizziopsis; Currah

Type species
- Nannizziopsis vriesii (Apinis) Currah

Species
- Nannizziopsis arthrosporioides Nannizziopsis barbata Nannizziopsis chlamydospora Nannizziopsis crocodili Nannizziopsis dermatitidis Nannizziopsis draconii Nannizziopsis guarroi Nannizziopsis hominis Nannizziopsis infrequens Nannizziopsis obscura Nannizziopsis pluriseptata Nannizziopsis vriesii

Genus of fungi

Nannizziopsis is a genus of fungi within the family Nannizziopsidaceae family. It was once within the Onygenaceae family, before being moved.
