= Testudomyces =

Scientific classification
- Kingdom: Fungi
- Division: Ascomycota
- Class: Eurotiomycetes
- Order: Onygenales
- Family: Onygenaceae
- Genus: Testudomyces; M.Solé, Cano & Guarro (2002)

Type species
- Testudomyces verrucosus M.Solé, Cano & Guarro (2002)

Genus of fungi

Testudomyces is a fungal genus in the family Onygenaceae. This is a monotypic genus, containing the single species Testudomyces verrucosus.
