= Ascocalvatia =

Scientific classification
- Kingdom: Fungi
- Division: Ascomycota
- Class: Eurotiomycetes
- Order: Onygenales
- Family: Onygenaceae
- Genus: Ascocalvatia; Malloch & Cain

Type species
- Ascocalvatia alveolata Malloch & Cain

Genus of fungi

Ascocalvatia is a genus of fungi within the Onygenaceae family.
