= Apinisia =

Scientific classification
- Kingdom: Fungi
- Division: Ascomycota
- Class: Eurotiomycetes
- Order: Onygenales
- Family: Onygenaceae
- Genus: Apinisia; La Touche

Type species
- Apinisia graminicola La Touche

Genus of fungi

Apinisia is a genus of fungi within the Onygenaceae family.
