= Nannizziopsis vriesii =

Scientific classification
- Kingdom: Fungi
- Division: Ascomycota
- Class: Eurotiomycetes
- Order: Onygenales
- Family: Nannizziopsidaceae
- Genus: Nannizziopsis
- Species: N. vriesii

Binomial name
- Nannizziopsis vriesii (Apinis) Currah

Synonyms
- Rollandina vriesii, A.E Apinis (1970); Arachnotheca vriesii, A.E Apinis (1981)

Species of fungus

Nannizziopsis vreisii is a keratinophilic microfungus in the order Onygenales. Also included in this family are dematophytes and saprophytic species. While the ecology of N. vriesii is not well known, there has been several studies which identifies the Chrysosporium anamorph of N. vriesii as a causal agent of skin lesions in reptiles across several regions. This species is usually identified under a microscope by its white ascomata, and hyaline and globose ascospores . Like many other fungi, N. vreisii has a sexual and asexual state, the asexual states are classified as the genus Chryososporium, Malbranchea or Sporendonema.

== Taxonomy and naming ==
Nannizziopsis vreisii was first described under the genus Rollandina by Patouillard in 1905. In 1970, further studies by Benjamin and Apinis lead to the addition of several new species, including R. vriesii to the genus Rollandina. Rollandina vreissi was placed under family Rollanda because the results of morphological studies demonstrated that its hyphae was similar to species previously described by Patouillard's. Rollandina vriesii was classified in the family Onygenaceae because of its ability to degrade keratin as demonstrated by hair perforation, and the presence of spheroidal ascospores with punctate walls. This was later classified under the genus Nannizziopsis which was first believed to be synonymous to the genus Arachnotheca, however, further examination provided enough evidence that the species were in fact different. Hence this species was identified as N. veriesii in the genus Nannizziopsis.

== Cultural characteristics ==
Nannizziopsis vriesii in culture produces dense colonies of diameter ranging from 25–30 mm within 14 days. The culture appears white and powdery with the reverse side having a yellowish color. Isolates are shown to have strong urease activity and are mesophilic with optimum growth observed at 30 °C. The growth of N. vreisii is inhibited at temperatures below 20 °C and above 37 °C. Unlike some closely related fungi, N. vriesii does not require an exogenous source of the vitamins thiamine or inositol for growth.

== Morphology ==
The sexual stage of N. vriesii consists of a whitish tumble-weed like fruiting body which is approximately 1 mm in diameter and a central cluster of asci containing ascospores. The hyphae which consist of exterior fruiting bodies, are characteristically rough-walled with septal constrictions. The lens shaped ascospores are brown in color and range in size from 2-3 μm. Like other members in the family Onygenacae, N. vriesii produces rhexolytically dehiscing conidia which can be either teardrop shaped or club-shaped, and form directly on the sides of the hyphae.

== Pathogenicity in reptiles ==
Several studies have shown that the Chrysosporium anamorph of Nannizziopsis vriesii (CANV) causes dermatitis and cellulitis in reptiles for example; CANV was isolated from the skin of chameleons, geckos and more recently coastal bearded dragons which had nodular lesions and crusty debris on the skin. Skin lesions have also been associated with poor nutrition which make reptiles more prone to infections as a whole. Once the skin becomes infected, there is an increased risk of developing a fatal condition called yellow fungus disease. Unlike other fungi which infect reptiles, infections with N. vreisii are contagious and often fatal if not properly treated. A recent review described a series of cases of infections which are resistant treatment, however certain agents may have some limited effectiveness, including: triamcinolone acetonide, neomycin, thiostrepton, nystatin. Usually infections are successfully treated with thiabendazole or ketoconazole, however, other suggested treatment options might include the removal of infected skin regions followed by the use of itaconazole as a maintenance drug. A related fungus, Ophidiomyces ophiodiicola, is responsible for an important disease of snakes.
