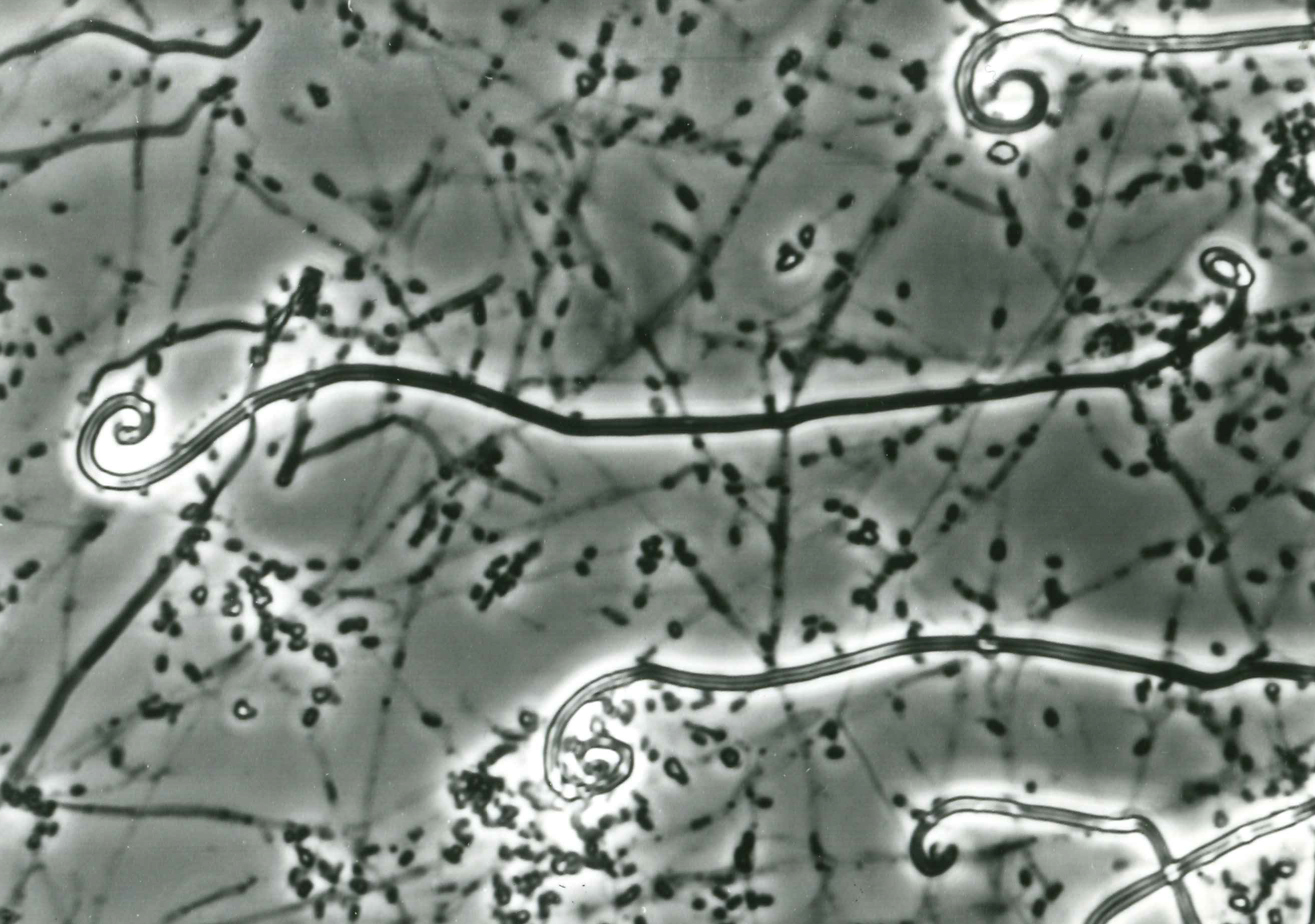

Scientific classification
- Kingdom: Fungi
- Division: Ascomycota
- Class: Eurotiomycetes
- Order: Onygenales
- Family: Onygenaceae
- Genus: Uncinocarpus
- Species: U. reesii

Binomial name
- Uncinocarpus reesii Sigler & Orr (1976)

Synonyms
- Gymnoascus uncinatus von Arx (1977); Gymnoascus siglerae von Arx (1974); Tripedotrichum herbariensis von Arx (1977)

= Uncinocarpus reesii =

Species of fungus

Uncinocarpus reesii is a species of saprotrophic microfungi that grows in soil and on keratinous materials such as hair, feathers and skin. It was the first species to be designated as part of the genus Uncinocarpus, owing in part to its characteristic development of hooked (uncinate) appendages. As the closest non-pathogenic relative of Coccidioides immitis and C. posadasii, it has become a subject of research interest.

== History and taxonomy ==
Uncinocarpus reesii was first recognized under the name Gymnoascus uncinatus by German taxonomist Michael Emil Eduard Eidam in 1893. The species is named after Robert Rees, an Australian mycologist who provided isolates of G. uncinatus to Lynne Sigler and G.F. Orr, who in 1976 proposed the re-designation of this species as the first a new genus: Uncinocarpus. This redesignation was based largely in part due to the species' characteristic development of hooked and spiralling appendages, which were not present in any other species of Gymnoascus. Since becoming the first species of the genus Uncinocarpus, others have joined it, including U. uncinatus and U. orissi. After the advent of high-throughput gene sequencing in the 1990s, genomic studies provided evidence demonstrating that U. reesii was the closest known non-pathogenic relative of Coccidioides immitis and C. posadasii, marking the point of divergence from which the pathogenic highly pathogenic Onygenaceae evolved.

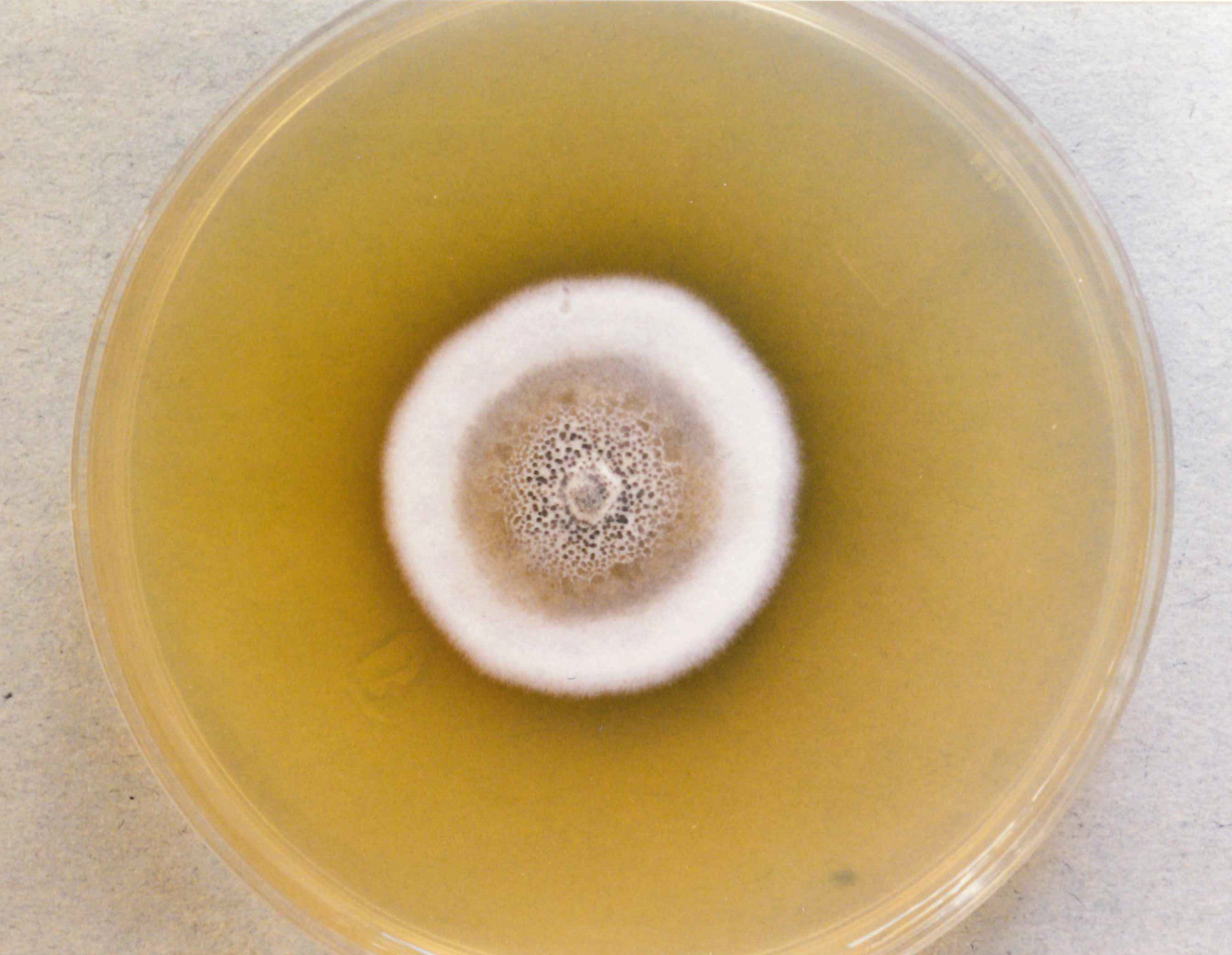
Strain UAMH 160 grown on Potato Dextrose Agar (PDA) at 40 C for 16 days

== Growth and morphology ==
In culture, colonies of U. reesii grow moderately fast and are yellowish-white to buff in colour, are flat and dense in shape, and range from velvety to powdery in texture. Arthroconidia of U. reesii tend to be broad compared to most Malbranchea, ranging from approximately 2.5-3.5 μm x 3.5-6 μm in size. As a heterothallic species, two compatible "sexes" are required for sexual reproduction to occur.

As with other members of the genus Uncinocarpus, U. reesii can develop hooked (uncinate) appendages on vegetative hyphae. These appendages are short and rigid, with thick walls approximately 8.8μm in diameter. Appendage length rarely exceeds the diameter of the fruiting body (ascocarp). These appendages are found in the asexual stage as extensions of vegetative hyphae, but only develop fertile spore-bearing structures (gymnothecia) in the sexual morph when compatible strains are mated. The gymnothecia are reddish-brown, initially formed on short, bulbous stalks before becoming more or less spherical. The ascospores are smooth, oblate and hole-filled (punctate). When the asexual morph of U. reesii develops these hooked appendages, they are referred to as "pseudogymnothecia", due to their similar appearance but lack of a spore-bearing structure. In lieu of spores, the asexual form produces arthroconidia that are cylindrical shaped with flattened ends.

== Physiology ==
Uncinocarpus reesii is capable of growing on many different amino acids, but comparatively fewer carbohydrates. In general, growth substrates with a high protein content are most conducive to its growth. U. reesii is capable of digesting keratin, and grows well in soil rich in animal matter, such as skin and hair. Though less commonly observed, U. reesii can survive, at least transiently, in human and animal tissue. Its growth is strongly to moderately inhibited at 37 °C.

Uncinocarpus reesii is also capable of digesting cellulose, basic plant sugars and cell wall components, allowing it to degrade plant materials in the surrounding soil. Though U. reesii can digest both protein and animal matter, its superior growth on high protein substances has led researchers to suggest that this ability to transfer from soil to living host gave rise to the ability of its descendants in the family Onygenales to colonize animals and cause disease.

== Habitat and pathogenicity ==
In the natural environment, U. reesii is commonly found growing in soil and on keratinous materials, and is found over a wide geographic range. Though there are no recorded cases of disease caused by U. reesii, there is evidence to support the hypothesis that the species is the root of the evolutionary branch from which pathogenic species in the Onygenales arose. The ability of U. reesii to shift from plant to animal substrates are theorized to have led to development of pathogenicity in several Coccidioides and Paracoccidioides species, both of which are highly genetically similar to U. reesii. Another related Uncinocarpus species, U. orissi, has been implicated in one deep skin infection and two pulmonary infections of humans.
