= Pseudoamauroascus =

Scientific classification
- Kingdom: Fungi
- Division: Ascomycota
- Class: Eurotiomycetes
- Order: Onygenales
- Family: Onygenaceae
- Genus: Pseudoamauroascus; Cano, Solé & Guarro

Type species
- Pseudoamauroascus australiensis Cano, M. Solé & Guarro

Genus of fungi

Pseudoamauroascus is a genus of fungi within the Onygenaceae family. This is a monotypic genus, containing the single species Pseudoamauroascus australiensis.
