= Nannizziopsis chlamydospora =

Scientific classification
- Kingdom: Fungi
- Division: Ascomycota
- Class: Eurotiomycetes
- Order: Onygenales
- Family: Nannizziopsidaceae
- Genus: Nannizziopsis
- Species: N. chlamydospora

Binomial name
- Nannizziopsis chlamydospora Stchigel et al., 2013

Species of fungus

Nannizziopsis chlamydospora is a keratinophilic microfungus in the order Onygenales that causes skin infections in reptiles, producing hyaline, thin-walled, small, sessile conidia and colonies with a strong skunk-like odour. This species is distinguished by producing chlamydospores and its ability to grow at 5 °C.
