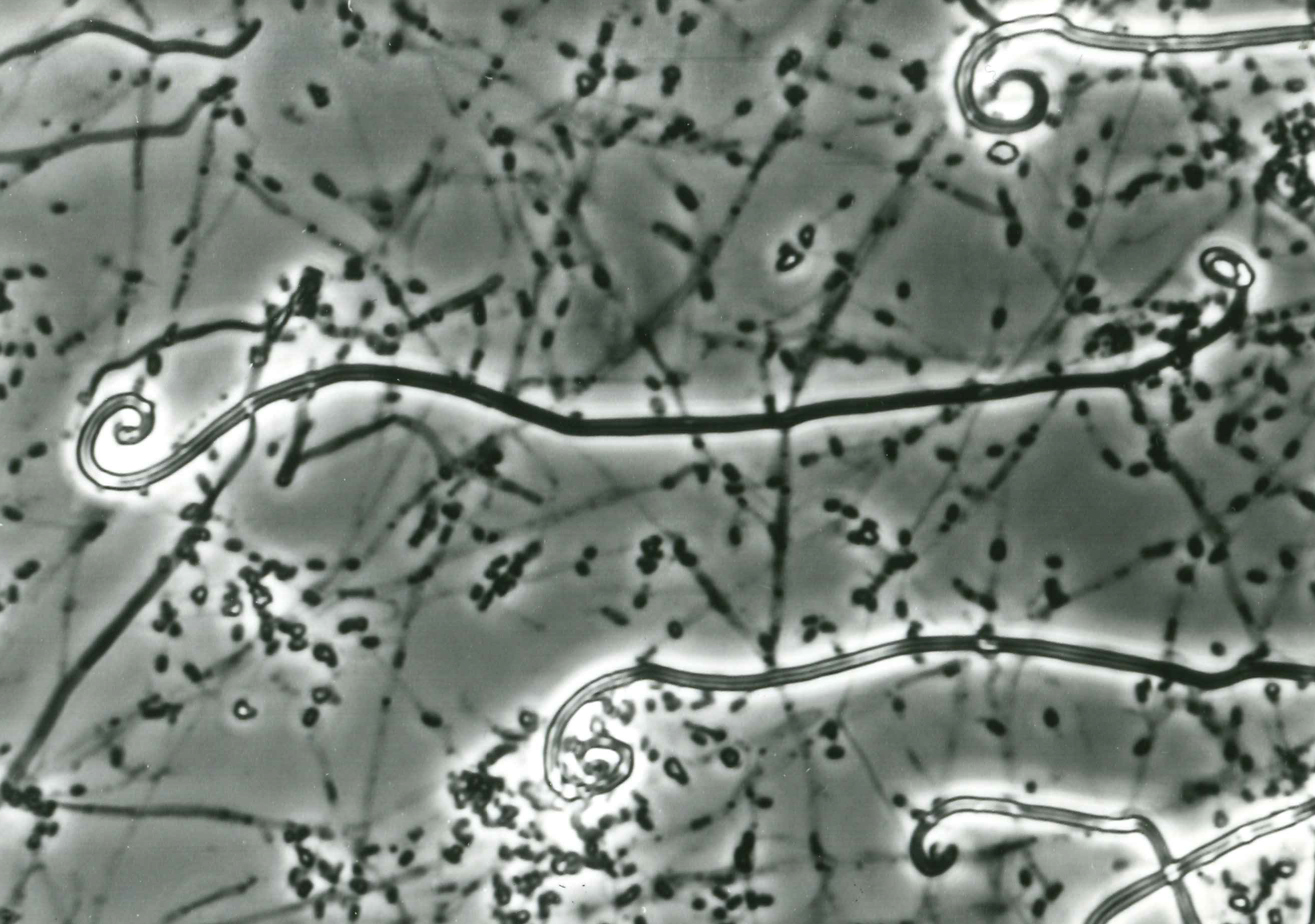
- Uncinocarpus reesii strain UAMH 160 in phase contrast microscopy showing hooked ascomatal appendage and Malbranchea anamorph

Scientific classification
- Kingdom: Fungi
- Division: Ascomycota
- Class: Eurotiomycetes
- Order: Onygenales
- Family: Onygenaceae
- Genus: Uncinocarpus; Sigler, G.F.Orr & Carm. (1976)

Type species
- Uncinocarpus reesii Sigler & G.F.Orr (1976)

Species
- U. orissi U. queenslandicus U. reesii U. uncinatus

= Uncinocarpus =

Genus of fungi

Uncinocarpus is a genus of fungi within the Onygenaceae family. The name is derived from the Latin word uncinus, meaning "hook" and the Greek word karpos (καρπός), meaning "fruit". It was distinguished from the genus Gymnoascus based on keratinolytic capacity, ascospore morphology and the development of hooked, occasionally spiraling appendages. Alternatively, Uncinocarpus species may possess helically coiled or smooth, wavy appendages, or lack appendages altogether, an example of such species being U. orissi.

Being a close non-pathogenic relative of the pathogenic dimorphic fungi Coccidioides immitis and Coccidioides posadasii, which cause Coccidioidomycosis, it is used in genomic research to help develop human vaccination, which might alleviate the Valley fever silent epidemic.
