= Uncinocarpus orissi =

Scientific classification
- Domain: Eukaryota
- Kingdom: Fungi
- Division: Ascomycota
- Class: Eurotiomycetes
- Order: Onygenales
- Family: Onygenaceae
- Genus: Uncinocarpus
- Species: U. orissi

Binomial name
- Uncinocarpus orissi Sigler, Flis & Carmichael (1998)

Synonyms
- Pseudoarachniotus orissi Sigler et al. (1998); Gymnoascus arxii Sigler et al. (1998)

Species of fungus

Uncinocarpus orissi is a species of microfungus that grows on dung and other keratinous materials, such as hair. It was the third species to be designated as part of the genus Uncinocarpus by Canadian mycologists Lynne Sigler, Arlene Flis and J.W. Carmichael in 1998 as a synonym for Pseudoarachniotus orissi and Aphanoascus orissi.

== Description ==
In culture, colonies of U. orissi are yellowish white in colour before darkening to buff or brownish-orange. Colonies are flat, dense and take on a woolly to coarsely powdery texture. U. orissi degrades keratin relatively quickly. U. orissi has a heterothallic mating system, requiring two compatible "sexes" for sexual reproduction to occur. It produces urease enzyme, allowing it to convert urea to ammonia and carbon dioxide. Unlike many other members of the genus Uncinocarpus, U. orissi are lacking in appendages.

As of 2002, U. orissi has been implicated in three recorded infections: one deep-skin infection and two pulmonary infections.
