= Arachnotheca =

Scientific classification
- Kingdom: Fungi
- Division: Ascomycota
- Class: Eurotiomycetes
- Order: Onygenales
- Family: Onygenaceae
- Genus: Arachnotheca; Arx (1971)

Type species
- Arachnotheca glomerata (E.Müll. & Pacha-Aue) Arx (1971)

Genus of fungi

Arachnotheca is a fungal genus in the family Onygenaceae. This is a monotypic genus, containing the single species Arachnotheca glomerata.
