= Byssoonygena =

Scientific classification
- Kingdom: Fungi
- Division: Ascomycota
- Class: Eurotiomycetes
- Order: Onygenales
- Family: Onygenaceae
- Genus: Byssoonygena; Guarro, Punsola & Cano

Type species
- Byssoonygena ceratinophila Guarro, Punsola & Cano

Genus of fungi

Byssoonygena is a genus of fungi within the Onygenaceae family. It is a monotypic genus, containing the single species Byssoonygena ceratinophila.
