= Bifidocarpus =

Scientific classification
- Kingdom: Fungi
- Division: Ascomycota
- Class: Eurotiomycetes
- Order: Onygenales
- Family: Onygenaceae
- Genus: Bifidocarpus; Cano, Guarro & R.F. Castañeda

Type species
- Bifidocarpus cubensis Cano, Guarro & R.F. Castañeda

Genus of fungi

Bifidocarpus is a genus of fungi within the Onygenaceae family.
