= Stalkball =

Stalkball or Stalkballs may refer to:

- The genus Onygena
- The genus Tulostoma
