= Leucothecium =

Scientific classification
- Kingdom: Fungi
- Division: Ascomycota
- Class: Eurotiomycetes
- Order: Onygenales
- Family: Onygenaceae
- Genus: Leucothecium; Arx & Samson

Type species
- Leucothecium emdenii Arx & Samson

Genus of fungi

Leucothecium is a genus of fungi within the Onygenaceae family.
