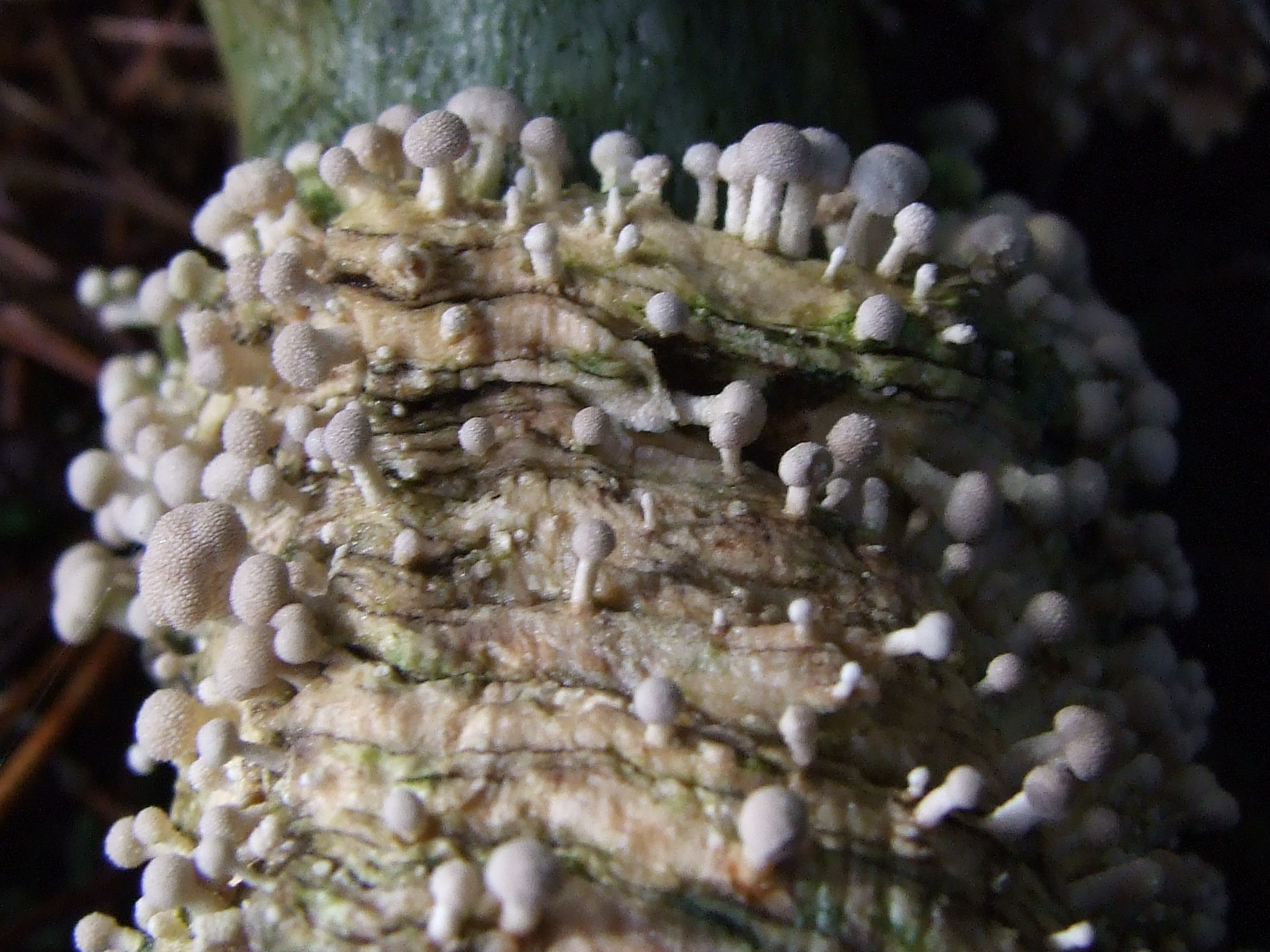

Scientific classification
- Kingdom: Fungi
- Division: Ascomycota
- Class: Eurotiomycetes
- Order: Onygenales
- Family: Onygenaceae
- Genus: Onygena
- Species: O. equina

Binomial name
- Onygena equina (Willd.) Pers. (1800)

Synonyms
- Lycoperdon equinum Willd. (1787)

= Onygena equina =

Species of fungus

Onygena equina, commonly known as the horn stalkball, is a species of fungus in the family Onygenaceae. The fungus grows on putrefying hooves and horns, and can digest the keratin in those substrates. Fruit bodies are small and white, with thick stipes supporting a "head" shaped like a flattened sphere. The skin, or peridium, of the head appears powdery or like a white crust, and breaks open in maturity, falling off in irregular pieces to expose the pale reddish-brown powdery spores within. The fungus is known from Europe and North America.

== Taxonomy ==
The species was first described by Carl Ludwig von Willdenow as Lycoperdon equinum in 1787. Christian Hendrik Persoon transferred it to the genus Onygena in 1800, giving it the name by which it is known today. The specific epithet equina is the Latin word for "horse". The common name for the fungus is "horn stalkball".

== Description ==
The fruit bodies have a spherical, flattened head that is whitish to cream before becoming brownish. Its white to brownish cylindrical stipe measures 3–6 mm (0.12–0.24 in) by 2 mm (0.08 in) thick. The perineum (outer skin) of the head breaks when the fruit body is mature, which exposes the brown and powdery spores inside. Spores are broadly elliptical, smooth, light brown, and measure 8–9 by 4.5–5.5 μm. They contain one or two oil droplets. The asci (spore-bearing cells) are 14–20 by 12–14 μm, nearly spherical and inamyloid. Fruit bodies of O. equina are not edible.

Onygena corvina is a similar species that grows on the remains of small mammals in owl pellets, on old feathers, or on tufts of animal hair. Another lookalike, Phleogena faginea, grows on wood and smells of curry.

== Development ==
British botanist Harry Marshall Ward was able to cultivate the fungus and described its life cycle in an 1899 publication. He determined that the white powder on the fruit bodies were chlamydospores, which were formed at the ends up erect hyphae. As the fruit bodies mature, the hyphae that held the chlamydospores fuse and form the peridium of the fruit body. This is followed by additional changes in the internal hyphae, which form claw-like filaments that push their way into the internal spaces and cavities of the fruit bodies. These claw-shaped hyphae form asci, which disappear as the spores mature, leaving the spores lying loose in the gleba.

William Broadhurst Brierley studied spore germination in the 1910s. He determined that fully grown ("ripe") ascospores can be germinated after a lengthy resting period, but a pretreatment with gastric acids reduced the time required. The time that mature spores need to germinate is correlated to the thickness and color of the spore wall. Treating "unripe" ascospores and chlamydospores with gastric juice did not decrease their germination time, and decreased their viability the longer they were treated. These observations confirmed and extended those already published by Ward; taken together, the results indicate that the spores must pass through the digestive tract of a cow to be viable.

== Habitat and distribution ==
The fruit bodies of Onygena equina grow singly or in tufts or clusters, on rotting horns of cattle and sheep, as well as remains of hooves. Fruiting occurs from spring to autumn. Fruit bodies are often overlooked by mushroom hunters, as animal remains are not a typical substrate for macrofungi. The species has been recorded from Europe and North America.
