= Pectinotrichum =

Scientific classification
- Kingdom: Fungi
- Division: Ascomycota
- Class: Eurotiomycetes
- Order: Onygenales
- Family: Onygenaceae
- Genus: Pectinotrichum; Varsavsky & G.F. Orr

Type species
- Pectinotrichum llanense Varsavsky & G.F. Orr

Genus of fungi

Pectinotrichum is a genus of fungi within the Onygenaceae family. This is a monotypic genus, containing the single species Pectinotrichum llanense.
