= Arachnomyces flavidulus =

Scientific classification
- Domain: Eukaryota
- Kingdom: Fungi
- Division: Ascomycota
- Class: Eurotiomycetes
- Order: Arachnomycetales
- Family: Arachnomycetaceae
- Genus: Arachnomyces
- Species: A. flavidulus

Binomial name
- Arachnomyces flavidulus Speg. 1912

Species of ascomycete fungus

Arachnomyces flavidulus is a species of ascomycete fungus discovered in 1912 by botanist Carlo Luigi Spegazzini. It was recovered from rotting Eucalyptus globulus leaves from a park in Buenos Aires, Argentina.

== Morphology ==
The fungus has a sparse, superficial, sulphurous matrix surrounding its surface. Attached to the fruiting body is a subiculum (wool-like mycelium growth), very thin and loose, formed by irregularly branched slender hyphae (1.5-2 μm). The perithecia are scattered, globose or globose-depressed, 250-500 μm in diameter, lacking an opening or ostiole, of yellow color, fragile, densely covered in yellowish brittle hairs of thinly membranous indistinct composition. The asci are subglobose, tiny, clustered, measuring 12 μm in diameter, with rapidly flowing octospores. These spores are globose to ellipsoid in shape, very thinly coated and light, 4 to 3 μm wide. The species appears similar to Eurotium.

== Taxonomy ==
A. flavidulus was listed as a doubtful species since 1970 because it produces ascospores that differ from other Arachnomyces members.
