= Renispora =

Scientific classification
- Domain: Eukaryota
- Kingdom: Fungi
- Division: Ascomycota
- Class: Eurotiomycetes
- Order: Onygenales
- Family: Onygenaceae
- Genus: Renispora; Sigler & J.W. Carmich.

Type species
- Renispora flavissima Sigler, P.K. Gaur, Lichtw. & J.W. Carmich.

Genus of fungi

Renispora is a genus of fungi within the Onygenaceae family.
