= Xanthothecium =

Scientific classification
- Kingdom: Fungi
- Division: Ascomycota
- Class: Eurotiomycetes
- Order: Onygenales
- Family: Onygenaceae
- Genus: Xanthothecium; Arx & Samson (1973)

Type species
- Xanthothecium peruvianum (Cain) Arx & Samson (1973)

Genus of fungi

Xanthothecium is a genus of fungi within the Onygenaceae family. This is a monotypic genus, containing the single species Xanthothecium peruvianum.
