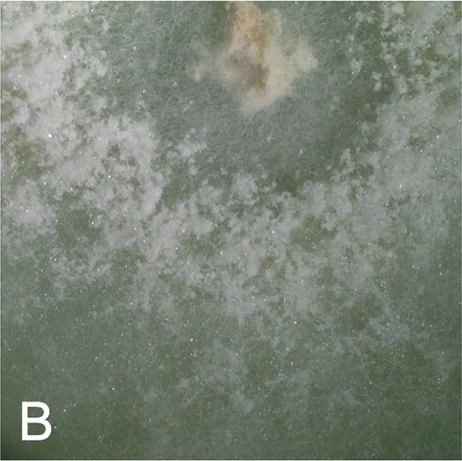
- A. bostrychodes colony

Scientific classification
- Domain: Eukaryota
- Kingdom: Fungi
- Division: Ascomycota
- Class: Eurotiomycetes
- Order: Arachnomycetales
- Family: Arachnomycetaceae
- Genus: Arachnomyces
- Species: A. bostrychodes

Binomial name
- Arachnomyces bostrychodes Rodr.-Andr., Cano & Stchigel 2021

= Arachnomyces bostrychodes =

Species of fungus

Arachnomyces bostrychodes is a species of infectious ascomycete fungus discovered in 2021 from clinical specimens of fungal strains in Texas, United States.

== Etymology ==
The specific epithet comes from the Greek βοστρυχος-, meaning curl, referencing the curly appearance of the reproductive hyphae.

== Morphology and asexual reproduction ==
Arachnomyces bostrychodes grows septate, hyaline, branched, vegetative hyphae with smooth and thin walls, between 1 and 2 μm wide. The fertile hyphae are well-differentiated, arising as lateral branches from the vegetative hyphae, successively branching to form dense, tightly curled, sinuous clusters that are also between 1 and 2 μm wide, forming random arthroconidia both intercalary and terminally.

The conidia measure 4–8 x 1–2 μm, are mostly curved and truncated at one or more commonly both ends; they are enteroarthric, hyaline, one-celled, smooth-walled, cylindrical, barrel-shaped; they are finger-shaped when terminal. The conidia are separated from the fertile hyphae by rhexolysis. There have been no observations of chlamydospores, racquet-shaped hyphae, setae, or sexual reproduction.

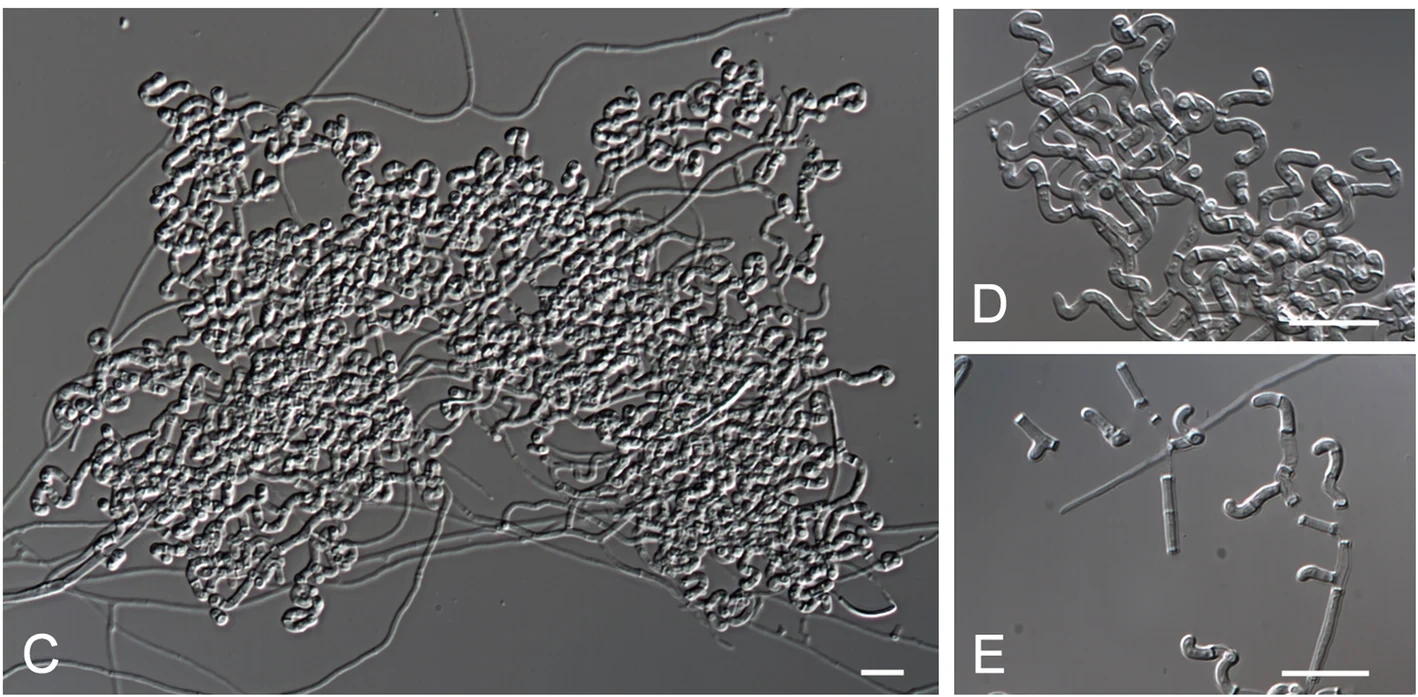
Micrographs of A. bostrychodes strain, showing the sinuous, coiled fertile hyphae (C and D) and the arthroconidia (E). Scale bar = 10 μm
