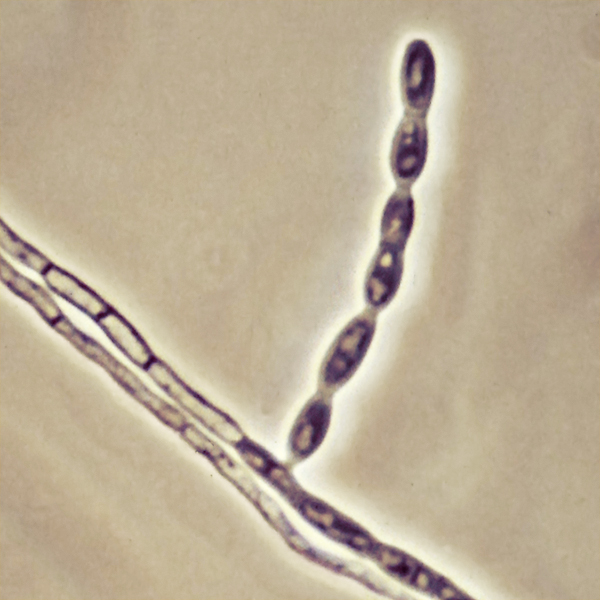

Scientific classification
- Kingdom: Fungi
- Division: Ascomycota
- Class: Eurotiomycetes
- Order: Arachnomycetales
- Family: Arachnomycetaceae
- Genus: Onychocola
- Species: O. canadensis

Binomial name
- Onychocola canadensis Sigler & Congly 1990

= Onychocola canadensis =

Species of fungus

Onychocola canadensis (Arachnomyces nodosetosus) is a relative of the dermatophyte and Arachnomyces nodosetosus. occasionally causes onychomycosis. It was described in 1990 from 3 clinical reports in Canada.

== Morphology and ecology ==
It belongs to the Family Gymnoascaceae, the colonies usually have a yellowish-white or pale grey colour, and grows slowly. In the aerial mycelium, arthroconidia are formed and the shape of cells will turn from cylindrical to round. Arthroconidia are usually single celled or two celled, range from 4-17 μm in length. Studies suggest its originated from soil because the infected patients are mostly farmers.

== Epidemiology ==
Onychocola canadensis has been reported in several clinical reports as an agent of toenail infection, mostly in temperate areas such as Canada, Australia, a European countries, occurs more frequently in female elderly. Infected nails often appear thick and distorted in shape, and usually in a yellowish green colour, studies have found Griseofulvin and Itraconazole could be an effective treatment for onychomycosis, however a confirmed effective treatment is unclear. Even though O. canadensis is found in infected nails, it is not always a pathogen. Rare cases have been reported in which O. canadensis has caused superficial dermatomycosis on palms and soles.
