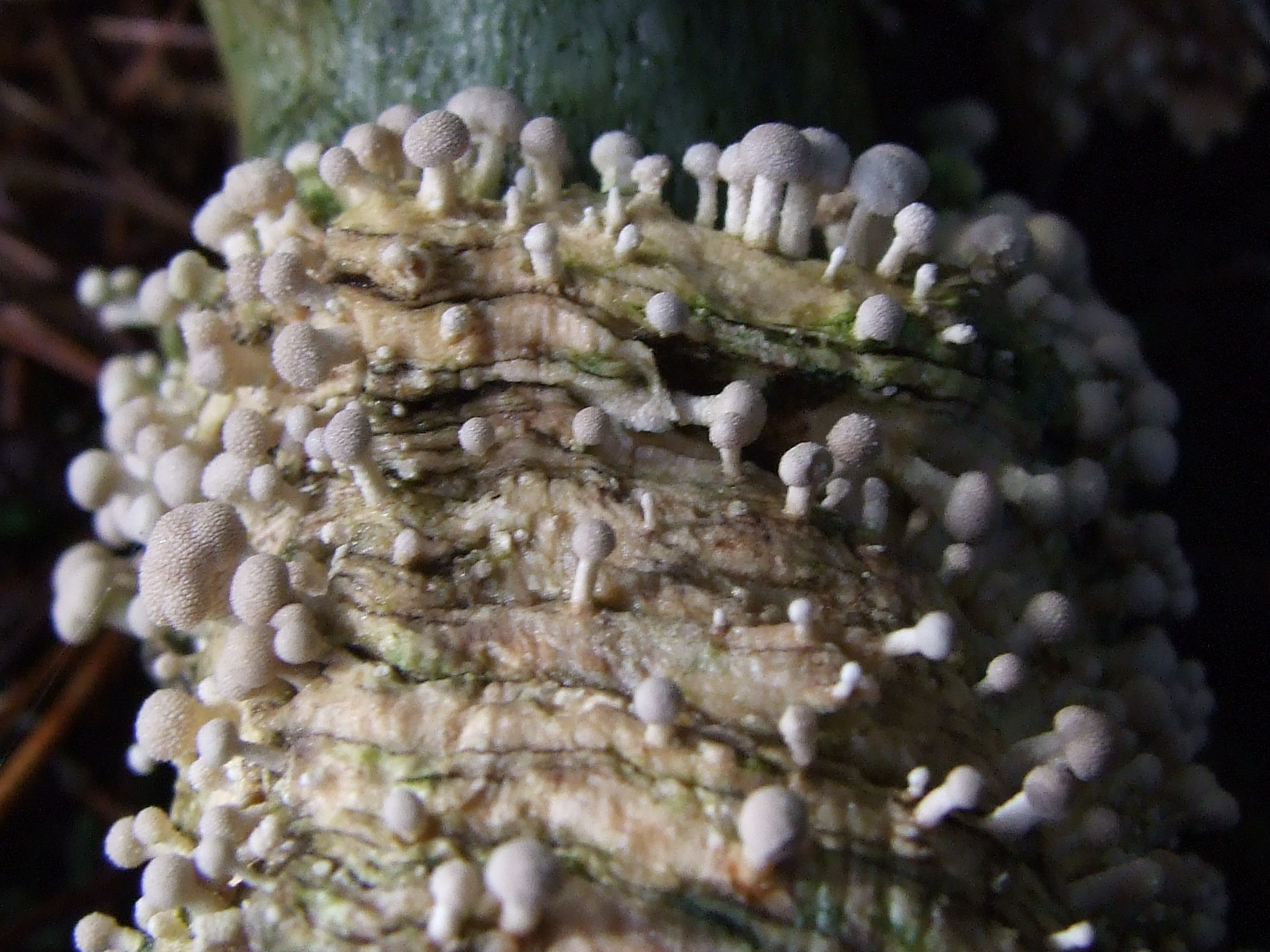
- Onygena equina

Scientific classification
- Domain: Eukaryota
- Kingdom: Fungi
- Division: Ascomycota
- Class: Eurotiomycetes
- Order: Onygenales
- Family: Onygenaceae
- Genus: Onygena; Pers. (1800)

Type species
- Onygena equina (Willd.) Pers. (1800)

Species
- O. apus O. corvina O. equina O. piligena

Synonyms
- Piligena Schumach. (1821)

= Onygena =

Genus of fungi

Onygena is the type genus of the fungal family Onygenaceae. The genus contains five species found in North America and Europe that grow on bones and feathers.
