= Chrysosporium =

Scientific classification
- Kingdom: Fungi
- Division: Ascomycota
- Class: Eurotiomycetes
- Order: Onygenales
- Family: Onygenaceae
- Genus: Chrysosporium; Corda (1833)

Type species
- Chrysosporium corii Corda (1833)

Synonyms
- Aleurophora O.Magalh. (1916); Atrichophyton Castell. & Chalm. (1919); Blastomyces Costantin & Rolland (1889); Rhinocladiella Kamyschko (1960); Rhinocladiopsis Kamyschko (1961)

Genus of fungi

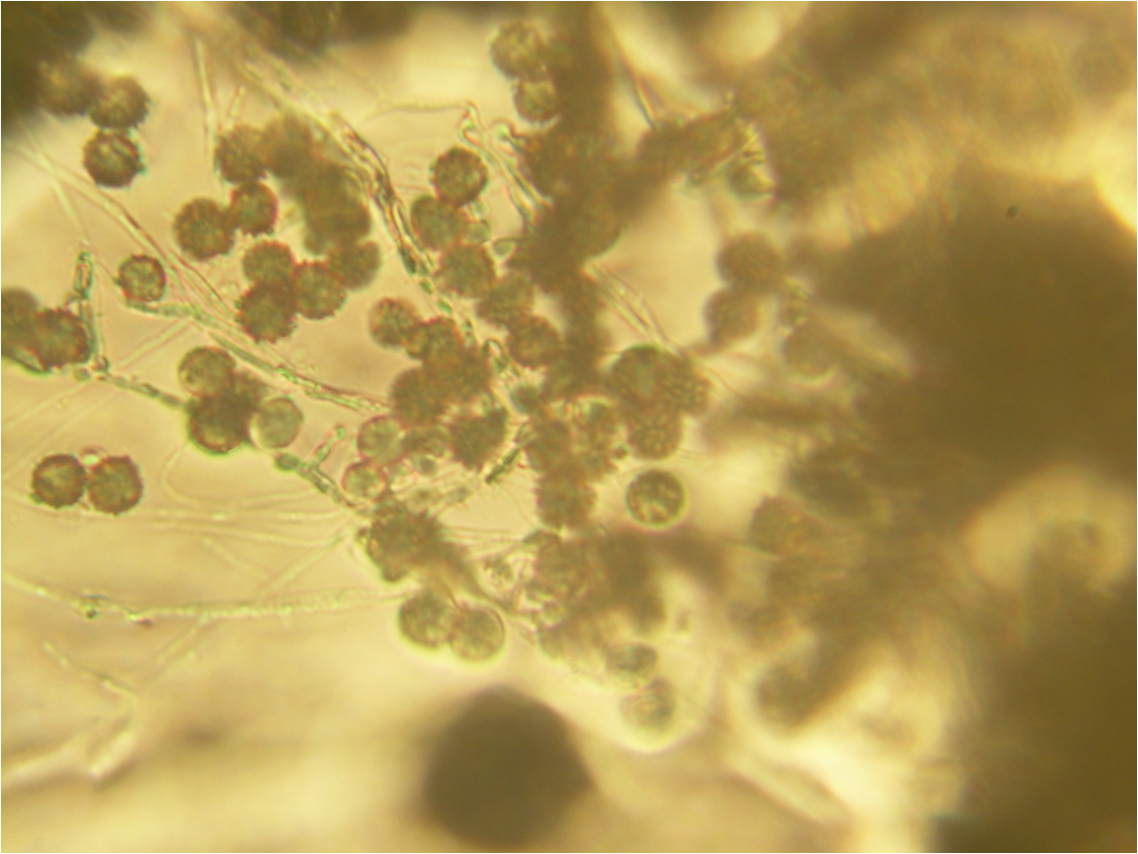
Chrysosporium spores

Chrysosporium is a genus of hyaline hyphomycetes fungi in the family Onygenaceae.

Chrysosporium colonies are moderately fast-growing, flat, white to tan to beige in color; they often have a powdery or granular surface texture. Hyaline, one-celled (ameroconidia) are produced directly on vegetative hyphae by non-specialized conidiogenous cells. Conidia are typically pyriform to clavate with truncate bases (6 to 7 by 3.5 to 4 um) and are formed either intercalary (arthroconidia), laterally (often on pedicels), or terminally.

== Clinical significance ==
Species of Chrysosporium are occasionally isolated from skin and nail scrapings, especially from feet, but, because they are common soil saprotrophs, they are usually considered as contaminants. There are about 22 species of Chrysosporium, several are keratinophilic with some also being thermotolerant, and cultures may closely resemble some dermatophytes, especially Trichophyton mentagrophytes, and some strains may also resemble cultures of Histoplasma and Blastomyces

Chrysosporium has been identified as an emerging infectious disease, first in Canada affecting reptiles at around 1995. It infected eastern massasauga rattlesnakes (Sistrurus catenatus catenatus). By 2011, it had affected northern copperheads (Agkistrodon contortrix mokasen), timber rattlesnakes, black rat snakes, black racer snakes and eastern garter snakes in New Jersey.

== Species ==
- Chrysosporium alboluteolum (Sacc. & Marchal) Dominik (1968)
- Chrysosporium alvearium F.Liu & L.Cai (2018)
- Chrysosporium articulatum Scharapov (1978)
- Chrysosporium barabicum Scharapov (1974)
- Chrysosporium botryoides Skou (1992)
- Chrysosporium carmichaelii Oorschot (1980)
- Chrysosporium chiropterorum Beguin & Larcher (2005)
- Chrysosporium christchurchicum Tripathi & Kushwaha (2005)
- Chrysosporium clavisporum Y.W.Zhang, Y.F.Han & Z.Q.Liang (2017)
- Chrysosporium crassitunicatum Kushwaha & S.C.Agarwal (1977)
- Chrysosporium echinulatum Hubka, Mallátová, Čmoková & M.Kolařík (2016)
- Chrysosporium europae Sigler, Guarro & Punsola (1986)
- Chrysosporium fermentatitritici K.Matsush. & Matsush. (1996)
- Chrysosporium filiforme Sigler, J.W.Carmich. & H.S.Whitney (1982)
- Chrysosporium fluviale P.Vidal & Guarro (2000)
- Chrysosporium foetidum Apinis & B.M.Clark (1974)
- Chrysosporium georgiae (Varsavsky & Ajello) Oorschot (1980)
- Chrysosporium globiferum Skou (1992)
- Chrysosporium gourii P.C.Jain, Deshmukh & S.C.Agarwal (1993)
- Chrysosporium guizhouense Yan W.Zhang, Y.F.Han & Z.Q.Liang (2016)
- Chrysosporium hirundinis Sharapov (1978)
- Chrysosporium hispanicum Skou (1992)
- Chrysosporium holmii Skou (1992)
- Chrysosporium hubeiense Yan W.Zhang, Y.F.Han & Z.Q.Liang (2016)
- Chrysosporium inops J.W.Carmich. (1962)
- Chrysosporium jingzhouense Y.W.Zhang, Y.F.Han & Z.Q.Liang (2017)
- Chrysosporium kreiselii Dominik (1965)
- Chrysosporium kuzurovianum Scharapov (1974)
- Chrysosporium leigongshanense Z.Li, G.P.Zeng, J.Ren, X.Zou & Y.F.Han (2017)
- Chrysosporium linfenense Z.Q.Liang, J.D.Liang & Y.F.Han (2009)
- Chrysosporium lobatum Scharapov (1978)
- Chrysosporium lucknowense Garg (1966)
- Chrysosporium magnisporum Stchigel, Cano, Mac Cormack & Guarro (2013)
- Chrysosporium medium Skou (1992)
- Chrysosporium mephiticum Sigler (1986)
- Chrysosporium merdarium (Ehrenb.) J.W.Carmich. (1962)
- Chrysosporium minus Skou (1992)
- Chrysosporium minutisporosum P.Vidal & Guarro (2002)
- Chrysosporium oceanitis Stchigel, Cano, Archuby & Guarro (2013)
- Chrysosporium olivaceum (Link) J.J.Taylor (1970)
- Chrysosporium osteophilum (Bonord.) Dominik (1968)
- Chrysosporium pannicola (Corda) Oorschot & Stalpers (1980)
- Chrysosporium pollaceii J.J.Taylor (1970)
- Chrysosporium pseudomerdarium Oorschot (1980)
- Chrysosporium pyriforme Skou (1992)
- Chrysosporium qinghaiense Y.F.Han, J.D.Liang & Z.Q.Liang (2013)
- Chrysosporium queenslandicum Apinis & R.G.Rees (1977)
- Chrysosporium sanyaense Yan W.Zhang, Y.F.Han, J.D.Liang & Z.Q.Liang (2013)
- Chrysosporium sepedonioides (Harz) Dominik (1968)
- Chrysosporium sepedonium Dominik (1968)
- Chrysosporium serratum Dominik (1968)
- Chrysosporium shanxiense Yan W. Zhang, Wan H.Chen, X.Zou, Y.F.Han & Z.Q.Liang (2016)
- Chrysosporium siglerae Cano & Guarro (1994)
- Chrysosporium sinense Z.Q.Liang (1991)
- Chrysosporium speluncarum A.Nováková & M. Kolařík (2010)
- Chrysosporium spinosum (Sacc.) Dominik (1968)
- Chrysosporium spinulosum Negroni, Negr. Bonv., R. Freire & Pomina (1963)
- Chrysosporium submersum P.Vidal & Guarro (2002)
- Chrysosporium sulphureum (Fiedl.) Oorschot & Samson (1980)
- Chrysosporium synchronum Oorschot (1980)
- Chrysosporium tropicum J.W.Carmich. (1962)
- Chrysosporium tuberculatum Dominik (1968)
- Chrysosporium undulatum P.Vidal, Guarro & Ulfig (1999)
- Chrysosporium vallenarense Oorschot & Piont. (1985)
- Chrysosporium zonatum Al-Musallam & C.S.Tan (1989)
