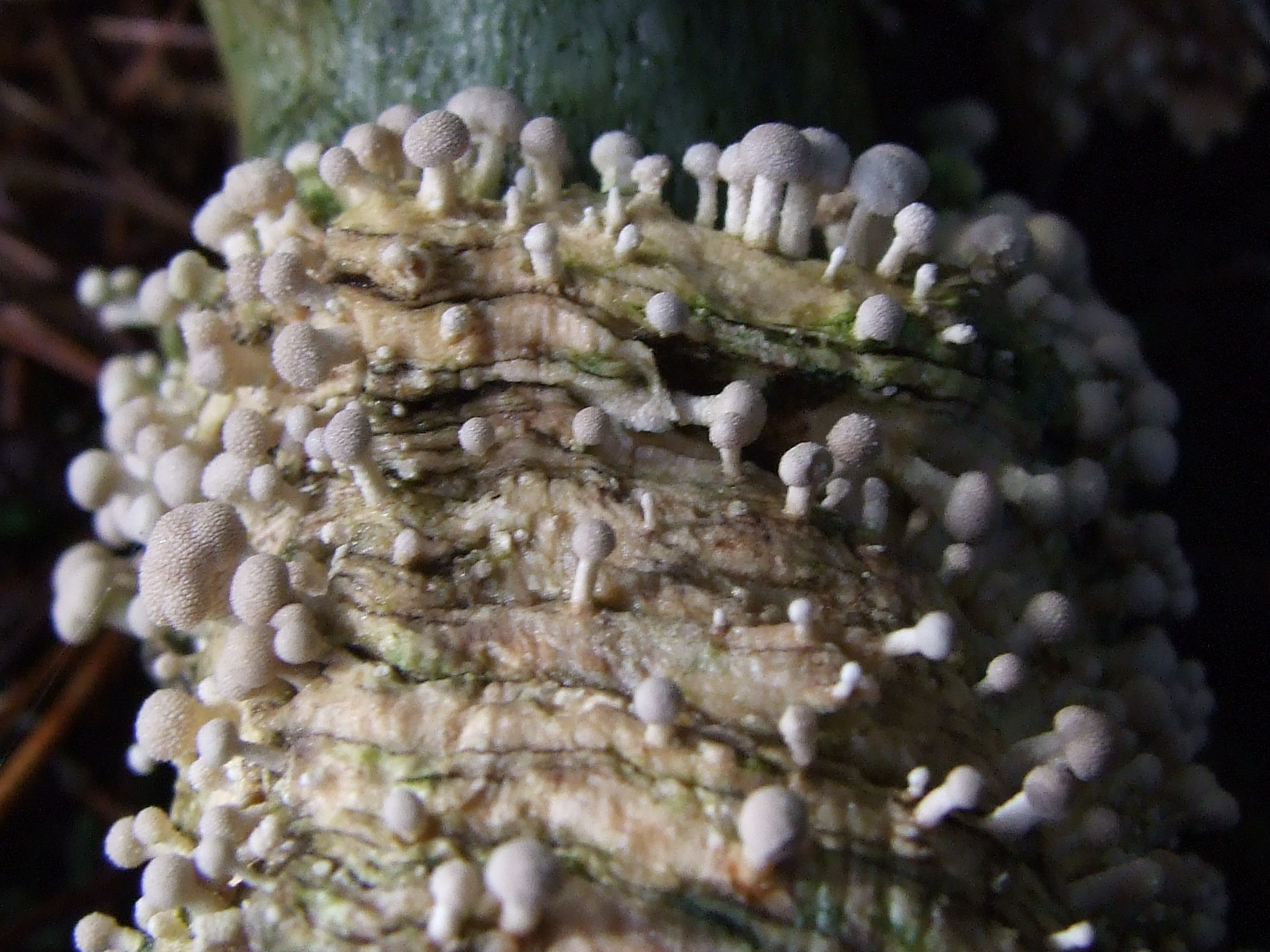
- Onygena equina

Scientific classification
- Kingdom: Fungi
- Division: Ascomycota
- Class: Eurotiomycetes
- Order: Onygenales
- Family: Onygenaceae; Berk. (1857)

Type genus
- Onygena Pers. (1800)

= Onygenaceae =

Family of fungi

The Onygenaceae are a family of fungi in the Ascomycota, class Eurotiomycetes.

== Genera ==
These are the genera that are in the Onygenaceae, according to a 2021 review of fungal classification. Following the genus name is the taxonomic authority (those who first circumscribed the genus; standardized author abbreviations are used), year of publication, and the estimated number of species.

- Amauroascus J.Schröt. – 15 spp.
- Aphanoascus Zukal, 1890 – 18 spp.
- Apinisia La Touche – 3 spp.
- Arachnotheca J.A.von Arx (1971) – 1 sp.
- Ascocalvatia D.W.Malloch & R.F.Cain (1971) – 1 sp.
- Auxarthron G.F.Orr & Kuehn (1963) – 13 spp.
- Auxarthronopsis R.Sharma, Y.Gräser & S.K.Singh (2013) – 2 spp.
- Bifidocarpus J.Cano, J.Guarro & R.F.Castañeda Ruiz (1994) – 2 spp.
- Byssoonygena J.Guarro, L.Punsola & J.Cano (1987) – 1 sp.
- Canomyces Rahul Sharma & Shouche (2020) – 1 sp.
- Castanedomyces J.Cano, L.B.Pitarch & J.Guarro (2002) – 1 sp.
- Chlamydosauromyces L.Sigler, S.Hambleton & J.A.Paré (2002) – 1 sp.
- Chrysosporium Corda (1833) – 66 spp.
- Coccidioides G.W.Stiles (1896) – 6 spp.
- Currahomyces Rahul Sharma & Shouche (2019) – 1 sp.
- Kuehniella G.F.Orr (1976) – 2 spp.
- Leucothecium Arx & Samson (1973) – 3 spp.
- Malbranchea Sacc. (1882) – 23 spp.
- Myotisia Kubátová, M.Kolařík & Hubka (2017) – 1 sp.
- Myriodontium Samson & Polon. (1978) – 1 sp.
- Neoarachnotheca Ulfig, Cano & Guarro (1997) – 1 sp.
- Neogymnomyces G.F.Orr (1970) – 2 spp.
- Onygena Pers. (1800) – 10 spp.
- Ophidiomyces Sigler, Hambl. & Paré (2013) – 1 sp.
- Paranannizziopsis Sigler, Hambl. & Paré (2013) – 4 spp.
- Pectinotrichum Varsavsky & G.F.Orr, 1971 – 2 spp.
- Polytolypa J.A.Scott & D.W.Malloch, 1993 – 2 spp.
- Pseudoamauroascus Cano, M.Solé & Guarro (2002) – 1 sp.
- Renispora Sigler & J.W.Carmich. (1979) – 2 spp.
- Testudomyces Cano, M.Solé & Guarro (2002) – 2 spp.
- Uncinocarpus Sigler & G.F.Orr (1976) – 2 spp.
- Xanthothecium Arx & Samson (1973) – 1 sp.
