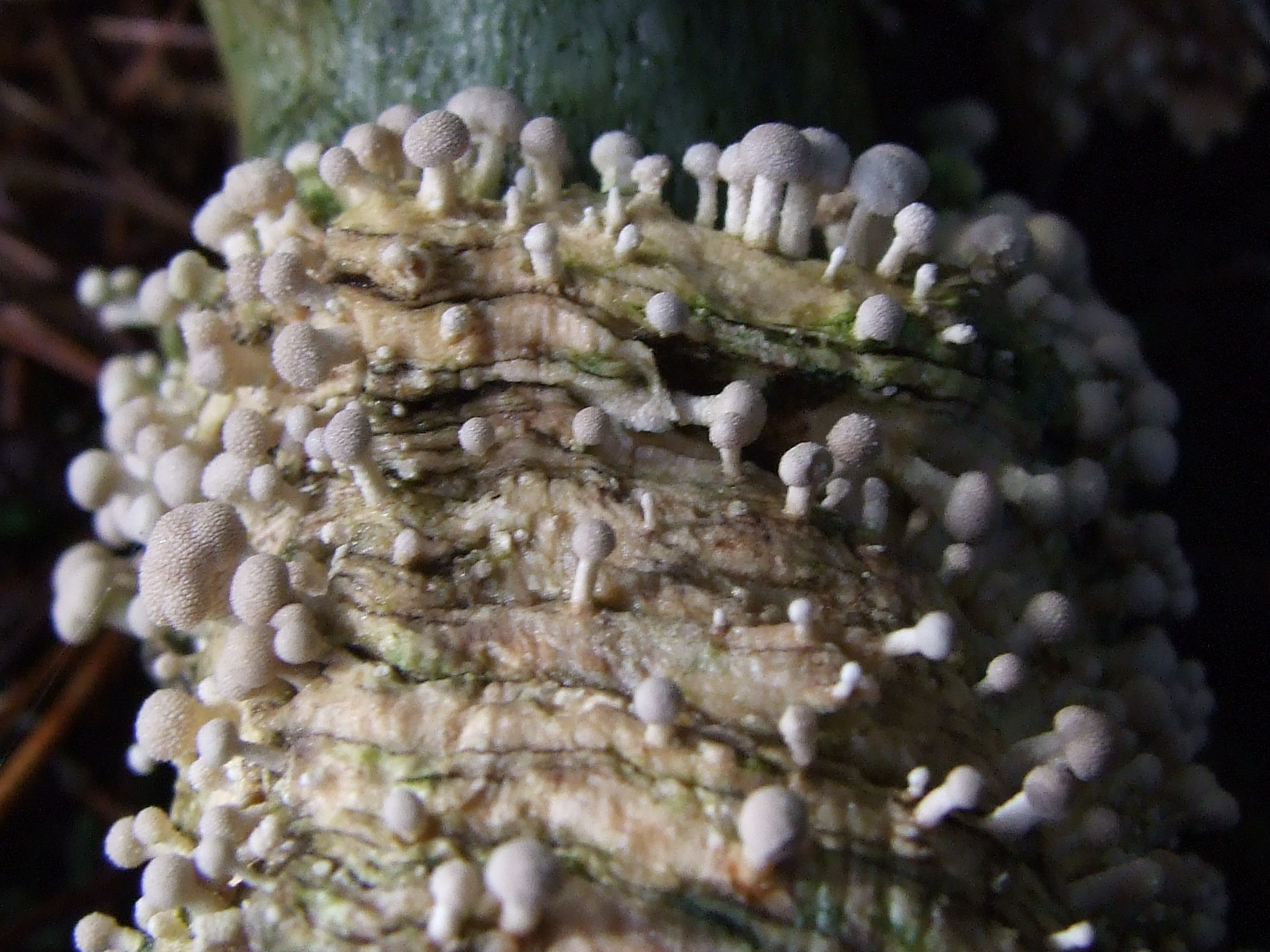
- Onygena equina

Scientific classification
- Kingdom: Fungi
- Division: Ascomycota
- Class: Eurotiomycetes
- Subclass: Eurotiomycetidae
- Order: Onygenales; Cif. ex Benny & Kimbr. (1980)

Type genus
- Onygena Pers. (1800)

Families
- Ajellomycetaceae; Apinisiaceae; Arthrodermataceae; Ascosphaeraceae; Gymnoascaceae; Helicoarthrosporaceae; Nannizziopsidaceae; Neoarthropsidaceae; Onygenaceae; Paracoccidioidaceae; Spiromastigaceae; Spiromastigoidaceae

= Onygenales =

Order of fungi

The Onygenales are an order of fungi in the class Eurotiomycetes and division Ascomycota. The order's last common ancestor is estimated to have lived 150 million years ago.

Onygenales can consume and break down keratin, the main component of the outer layer of skin. They are primarily found on animals, droppings, and areas frequented by animals. Many are dimorphic, and can change from mold to yeast form depending on their environment.

Many onygenalean fungi are pathogens. One species, Trichophyton rubrum, is the primary cause of athlete's foot. This order also includes the Coccidioides implicated in Valley fever. The Onygenales are important as emerging human pathogens because of the rising rates of immunosuppression due to live-organ transplant, HIV/AIDS, and autoimmune disorders such as lupus erythematosus.
