= Caesar Creek (disambiguation) =

Caesar Creek and Caesar's Creek may refer to:

- Caesar Creek (Ohio), a river in Ohio
- Caesar Creek State Park, a state park in Ohio
- Caesar Creek Township, Dearborn County, Indiana
- Caesar's Creek Pioneer Village, in Waynesville, Ohio
