= New Burlington =

New Burlington may refer to:

- New Burlington, Indiana
- New Burlington, Clinton County, Ohio, a former village
- New Burlington, Hamilton County, Ohio, a census-designated place
- New Burlington: The Life and Death of an American Village, a non-fiction book by John Baskin
