= Specimen Ridge =

Mountain ridge in Wyoming, United States

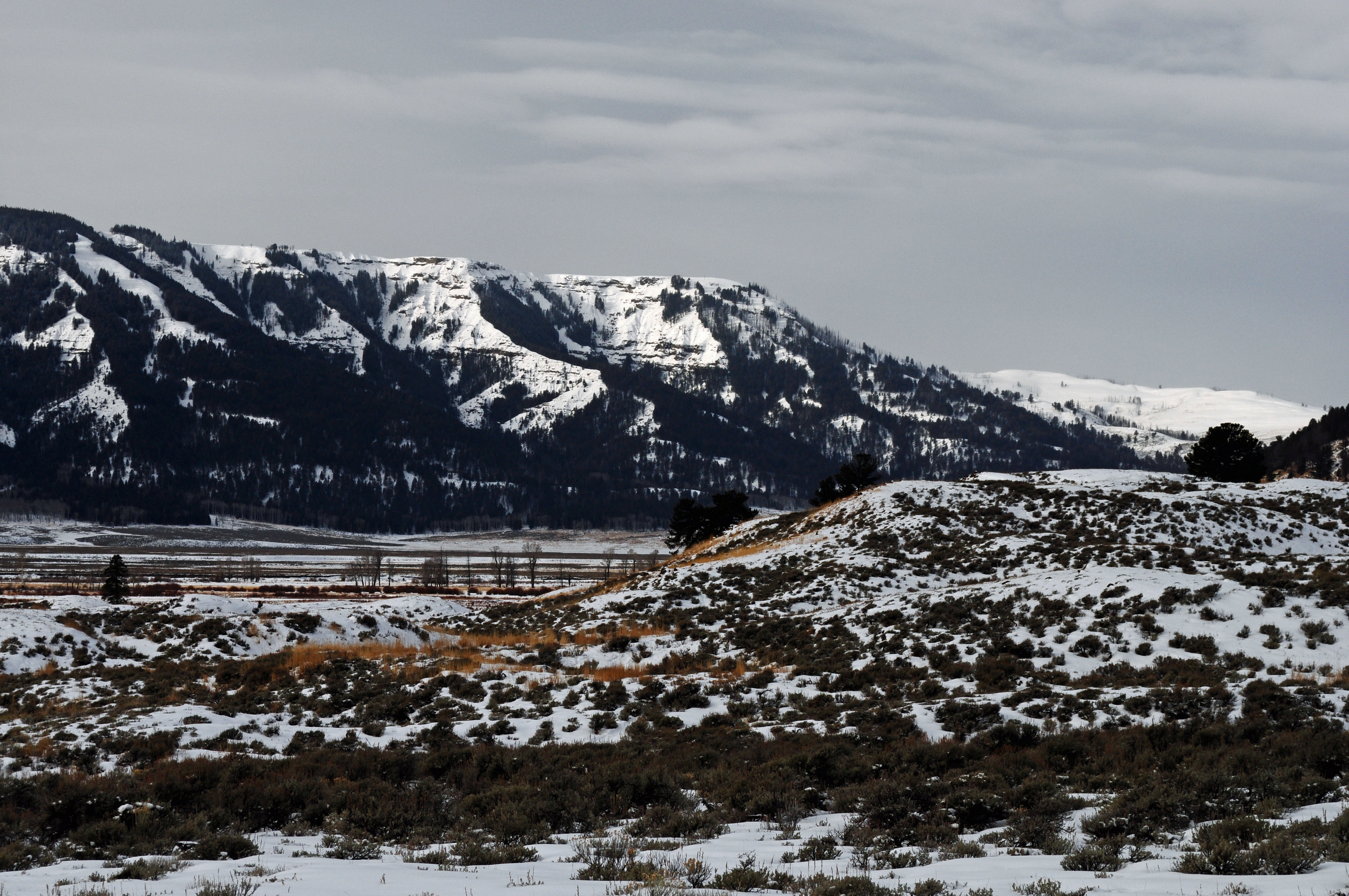
- North face Specimen Ridge from Lamar Valley

Highest point
- Elevation: 8,379 ft (2,554 m)
- Coordinates: 44°52′13″N 110°17′48″W

Geography
- Location: Yellowstone National Park, Park County, Wyoming, U.S.
- Parent range: Washburn Range
- Topo map: Amethyst Mountain

Specimen Ridge, el. 8,379 feet (2,554 m) is an approximately 8.5-mile (13.7 km) ridge along the south rim of the Lamar Valley in Yellowstone National Park. The ridge separates the Lamar Valley from Mirror Plateau. The ridge is oriented northwest to southeast from the Tower Junction area to Amethyst Mountain. The ridge is known for its abundance of amethyst, opal and petrified wood. It was referred to as Specimen Mountain by local miners and was probably named by prospectors well before 1870. The south side of the ridge is traversed by the 18.8-mile (30.3 km) Specimen Ridge Trail between Tower Junction and Soda Butte Creek. The trail passes through the Petrified Forest and over the summit of Amethyst Mountain el. 9,614 feet (2,930 m).

== Geology ==
Specimen Ridge consists of a geological formation known as the Lamar River Formation. Within the Specimen Mountain area, it consists predominantly of an undetermined thickness of conglomerate that is interbedded with lesser proportions of tuffaceous sandstone and siltstone. Volcanic breccia is absent. The conglomerates consist of a mixture of mudflow deposits (lahars) that are complexly interlayered with braided and meandering stream deposits. The lahar (mudflow) deposits consist of normally massive and structureless, matrix-supported conglomerates that contain subangular, poorly sorted gravel that range in size from 1 cm (0.39 in) to 2 meters (6.6 ft) in diameter. The majority of the sediments consist of well-bedded, clast-supported fluvial conglomerates that consist of grain-supported, subrounded, and moderately well-sorted gravel that typically ranges in size from 1 cm (0.39 in) to 30 cm (12 in). The vast majority of petrified wood occurs within the conglomerates. The fossil leaves, needles, pollen, and cones are largely found within tuffaceous sandstones and siltstones that were deposited either along the banks of either braided or meandering rivers, within their abandoned channels, or in shallow lakes of very limited extent. At Specimen Ridge, these sediments consist of volcanic material eroded from and accumulated downslope of an adjacent Eocene stratovolcano, known the 'Washburn Volcano', in an intermountaine basin. The Lamar River Formation is part of the Washburn Group.

The Lamar River Formation is part of the Absaroka Volcanic Supergroup. It is a thick accumulation of volcanic rocks that were either erupted from or eroded from the slopes of two belts of Eocene stratovolcanoes. These rocks accumulated within an intermountain basin between these belts. Before they were destroyed by erosion, these volcanoes are estimated to have had peaks that rose about 8,000 feet (2,400 m) to 10,000 feet (3,000 m) above adjacent intermountain valleys. Depending on location, the Lamar River Formation unconformably overlies either older lavas, conglomerates, tuffs, volcanic breccias of the Sepulcher Formation; Mississippian limestones and dolomites; or Precambrian gneiss. Based on radiometric dates and plant fossils from it, the Lamar River Formation is considered to be of Middle Eocene age.

== Yellowstone Petrified Forest ==
Within the Specimen Ridge, exposures of the Lamar River Formation is well known for the fossils of upright standing, petrified tree trunks and multiple beds containing buried petrified forests and petrified wood concentrations. The concentrations of silicified wood, upright standing, petrified tree trunks, and associated buried petrified forests of Specimen Ridge and adjacent Amethyst Mountain are collectively known as Yellowstone Petrified Forest. They have been known to science and studied for over 130 years.

Within Specimen Ridge, the Yellowstone Petrified Forest consists of a mixture of fossilized, in place (in situ) buried forests and beds of transported logs and stumps. The rare beds that contain buried forests were buried in place (in situ) by volcanic lahars and braided streams. The concentrations of fossilized upright stumps, flat-lying logs, and logs lying at various angles were transported from the higher slopes of adjacent volcanoes and buried by either volcanic lahars or braided and meandering streams. Notably, the 1980 eruption of Mount St. Helens, and other Quaternary and Holocene eruptions of other Cascade Range volcanoes have created virtually identical beds containing either the buried upright standing trunks of forests, transported logs and upright stumps, or a combination of both. These beds consist of a mixture of lahars and stream deposits. Prehistoric logs and upright trunks that are buried in Late Pleistocene lahar and stream deposits of Mount St. Helens were found to be the initial stages of being naturally petrified by silica.

In regard to these fossil forests and other fossils, collecting of fossils in Yellowstone National Park is illegal. In addition, visitors should stay on marked and maintained trails.

Images of Specimen Ridge
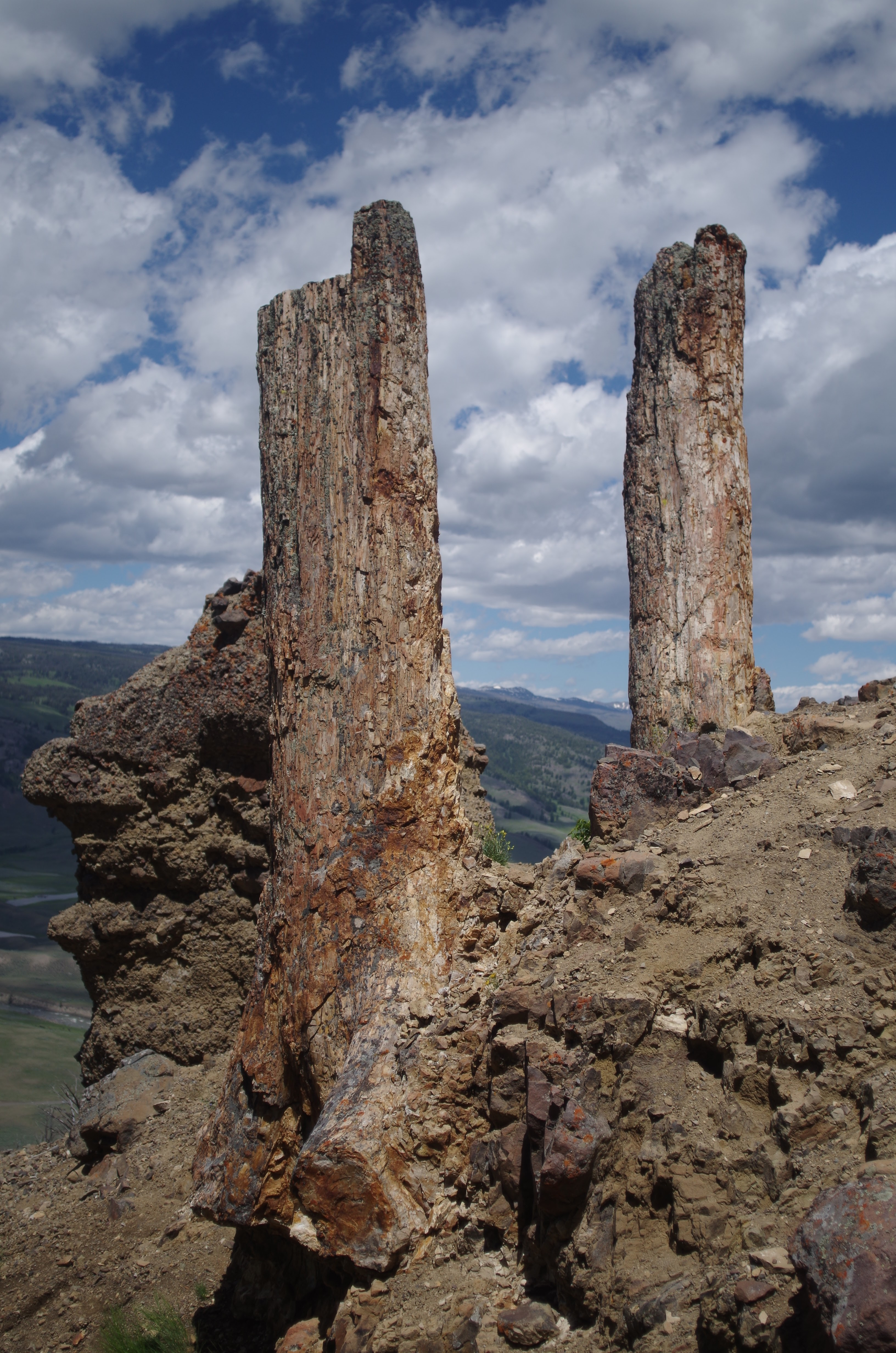
Fossilized trees on Specimen Ridge

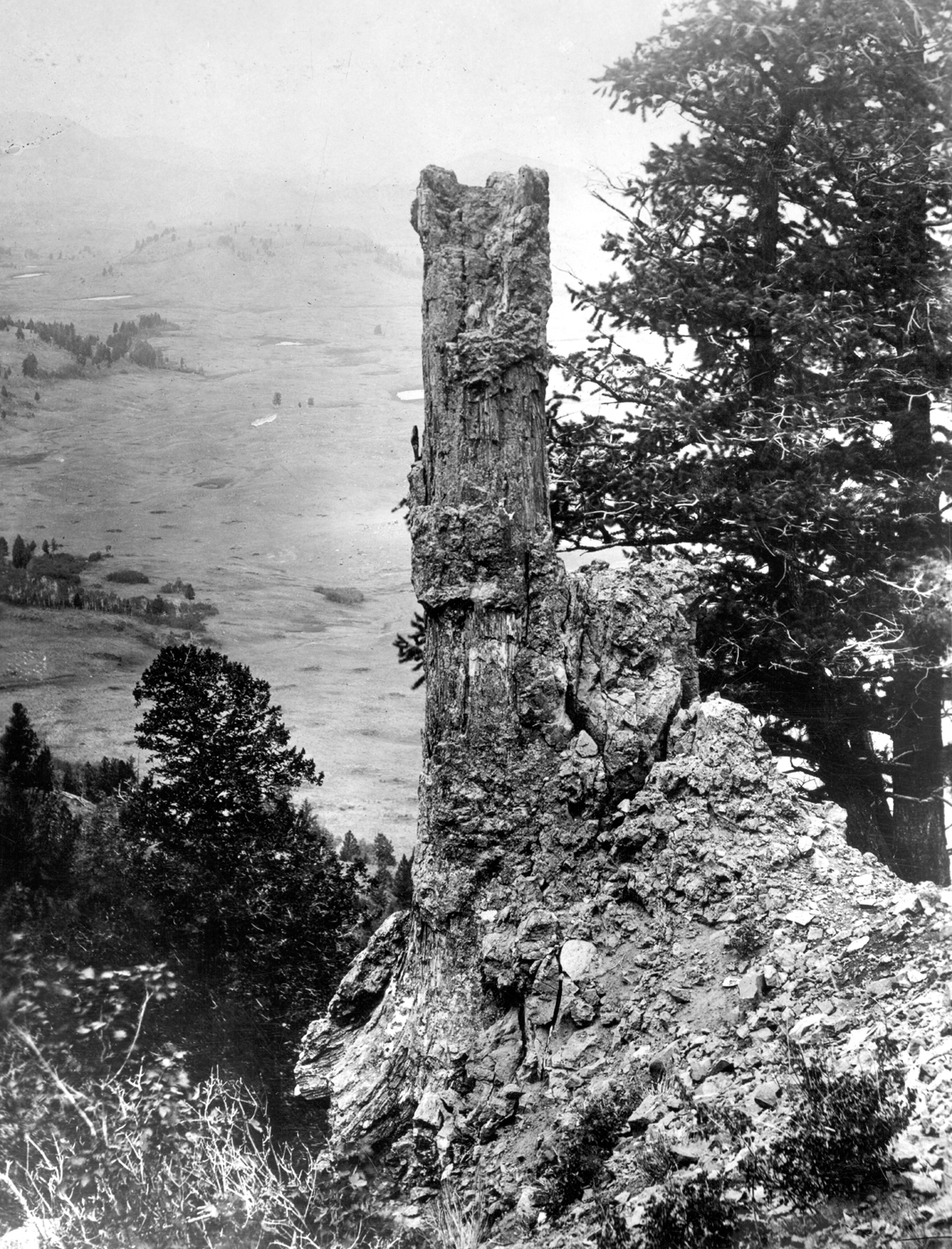
Fossil Tree, Specimen Ridge, 1890

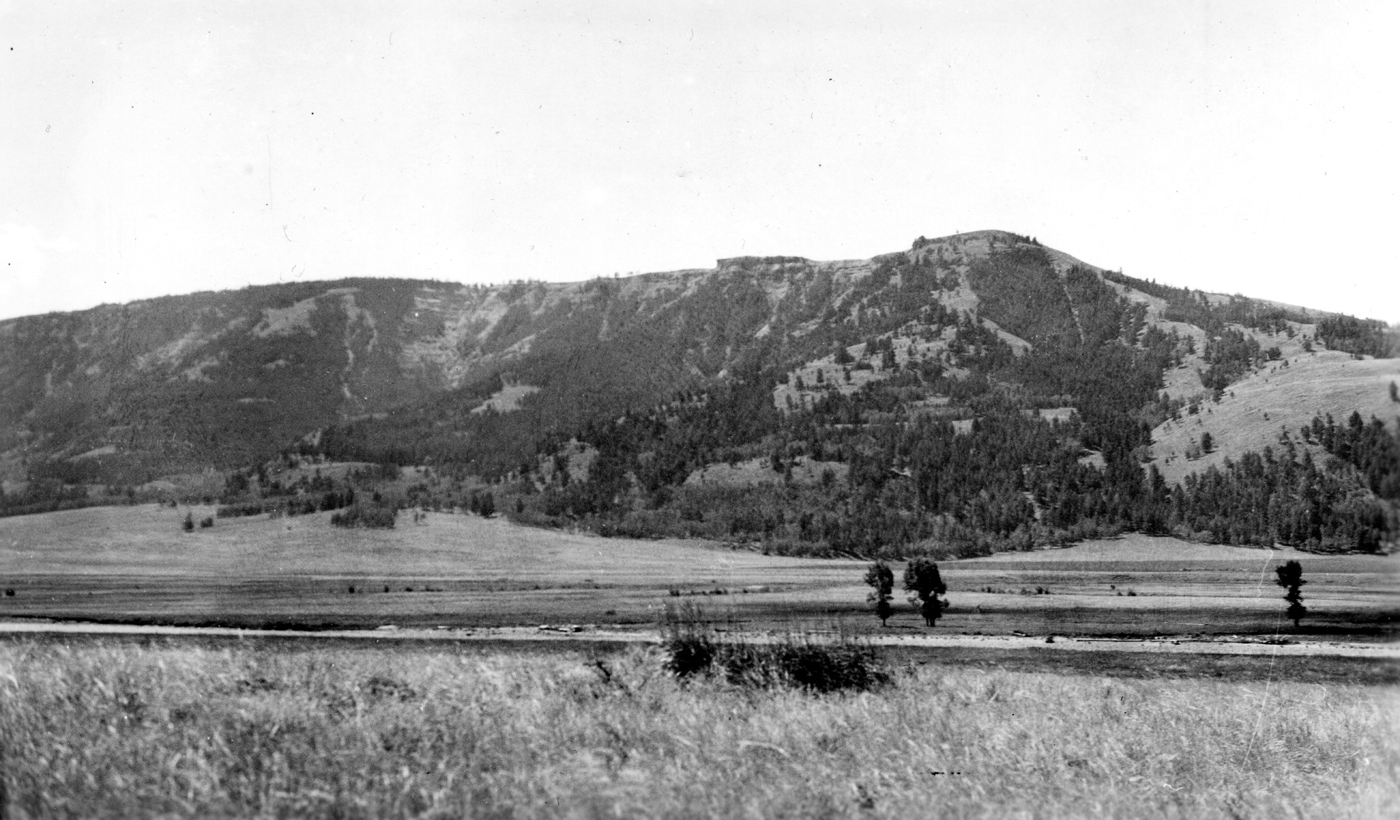
Location of the petrified forest on Specimen Ridge, 1938

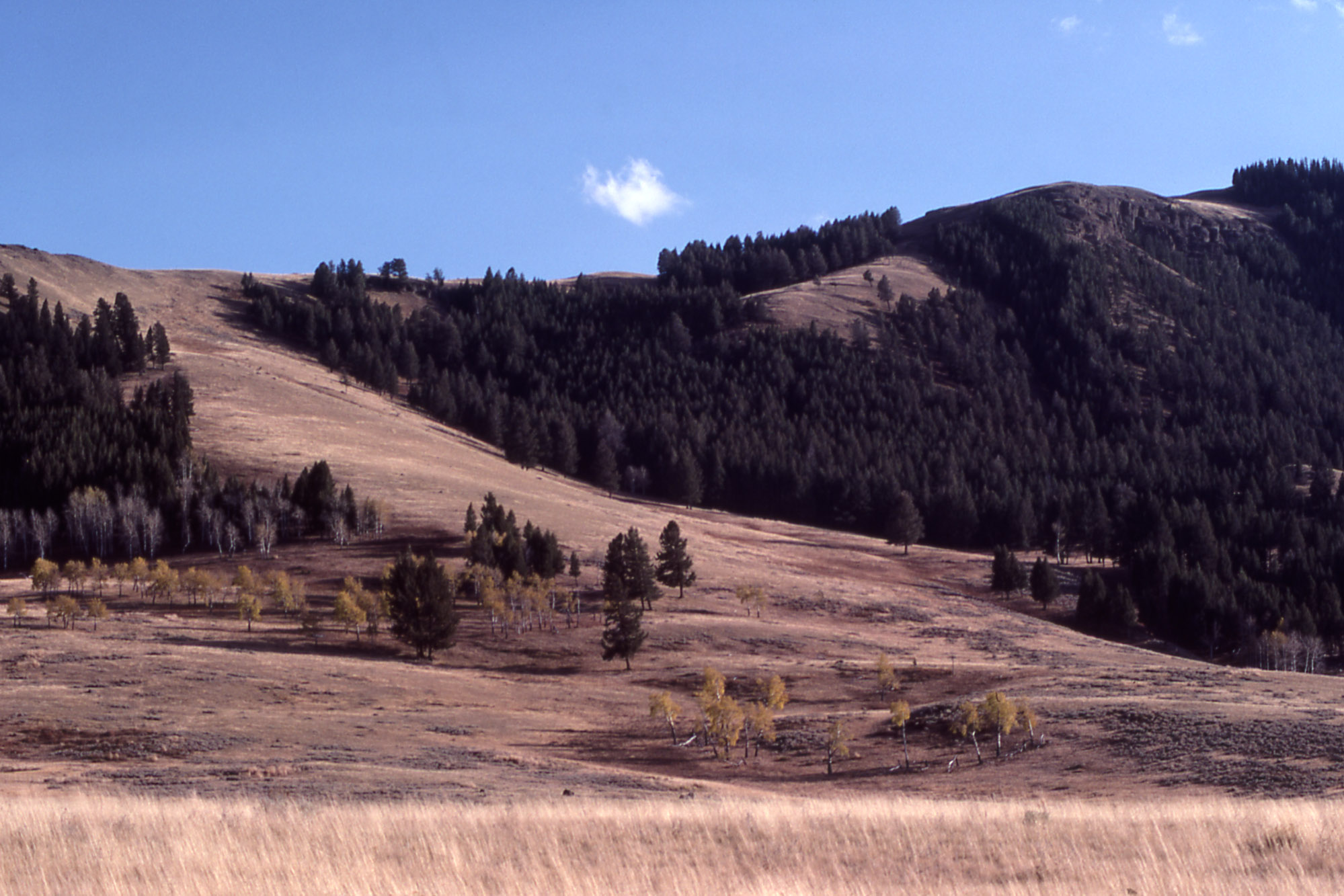
Specimen Ridge from Specimen Ridge Trail, 1977

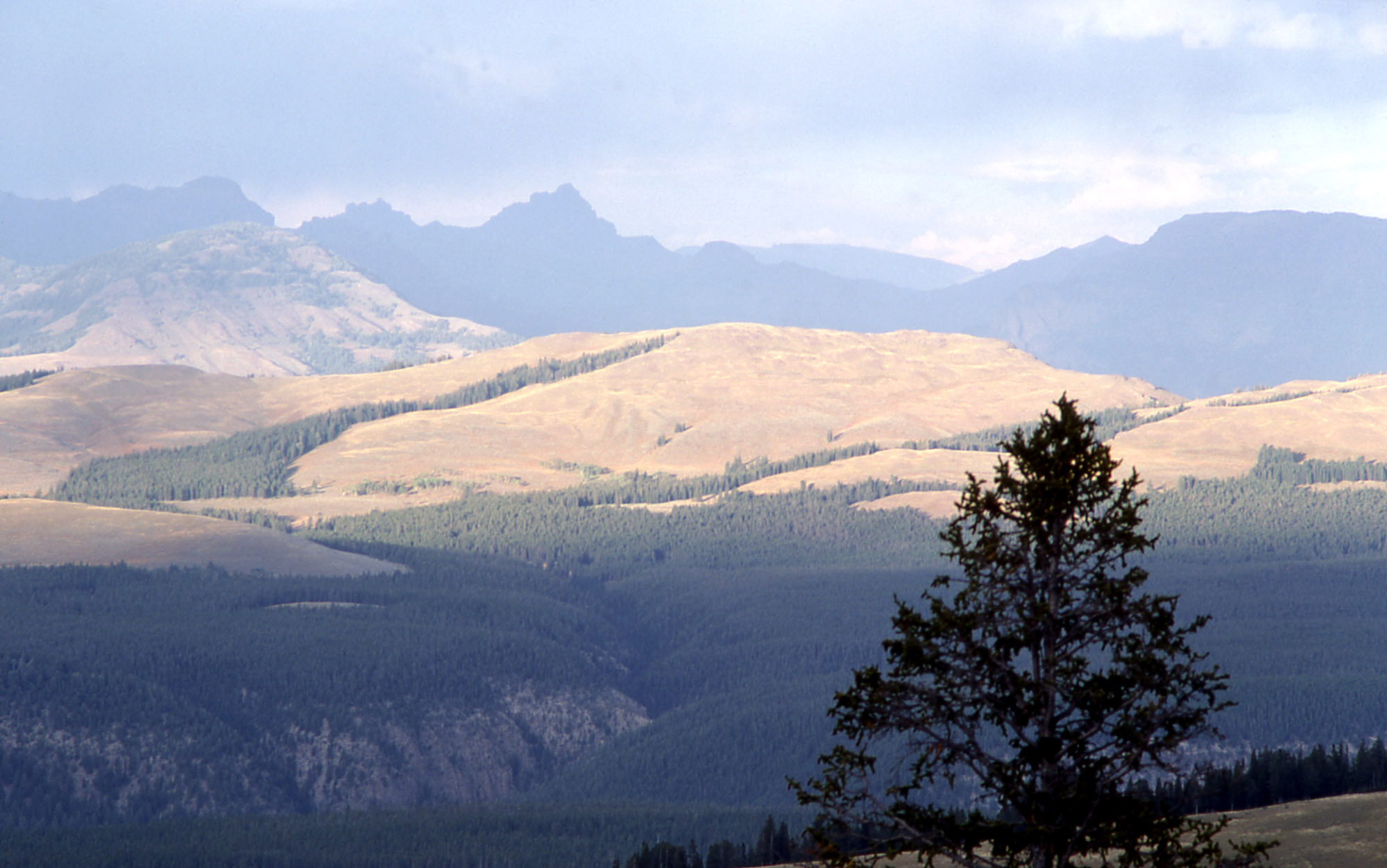
Specimen Ridge from Mount Washburn, 1977

== See also ==
- Erling Dorf
- Mountains and mountain ranges of Yellowstone National Park
