= Jonahs Run =

Stream in Ohio, U.S.

Coordinates: 39°29′39″N 84°01′26″W

Jonahs Run is a stream in the U.S. state of Ohio. It is a tributary to Caesar Creek.

Jonahs Run was named after an early settler. Variant names were "Jonah's Run" and "Jonas Run".
