= Amethyst Mountain =

Mountain in the U.S. state of Wyoming

Highest point
- Elevation: 9,609 ft (2,929 m)
- Coordinates: 44°49′43″N 110°15′15″W

Geography
- Location: Yellowstone National Park, Park County, Wyoming, U.S.
- Parent range: Washburn Range
- Topo map: Amethyst Mountain

Amethyst Mountain, el. 9,609 feet (2,929 m) is the highest peak and central part of a northwest – southeast trending ridge that lies between the Lamar River to the northeast and Deep Creek to the southwest within Park County, Wyoming. From northwest to southeast, this ridge consists of Specimen Ridge, Amethyst Mountain, and the Mirror Plateau in Yellowstone National Park. The nearest town is Silver Gate, Montana, which is 19.2 miles away.

In 1872, it was named Amethyst Mountain by the United States Geological Survey for amethysts found on its summit. This mountain is known for its abundance of amethyst, opal and exposures of well known and visited petrified forests. The summit of Amethyst Mountain is traversed by Specimen Ridge Trail, which also traverses the south side of Specimen Ridge between Tower Junction and Soda Butte Creek and through the Yellowstone Petrified Forest.

== Geology ==
Amethyst Mountain consists of a geological formation known as the Lamar River Formation. Within the Amethyst Mountain area, it is over 440 feet (130 m) thick and consists predominantly of conglomerate and lesser proportions of tuffaceous sandstone and siltstone. Volcanic breccia is absent and only a very few thin airfall volcanic ash beds have been identified in the exposures at Amethyst Mountain. The conglomerates consist of a variety of mudflow deposits (lahars) and braided and meandering stream deposits.

The lahar (mudflow) deposits consist of conglomerates that occur in massive and structureless beds. These deposits typically consist of matrix-supported, subangular, poorly sorted gravel that ranges in size from 1 cm (0.39 in) to 2 meters (6.6 ft) in diameter. Fluvial conglomerates are normally well-bedded and cross-bedded. They typically consist of grain-supported, subrounded, and moderately well-sorted gravel that typically ranges in size from 1 cm (0.39 in) to 30 cm (12 in). Most of the petrified wood and buried tree trunks occur within the conglomerates. Almost all of the fossil leaves, needles, pollen, and cones are found in the tuffaceous sandstones and siltstones. These tuffaceous sandstones and siltstones accumulated either along the banks of either braided or meandering rivers or within their abandoned channels. In the Amethyst Mountain area, the sediments comprising the Lamar River Formation consist of volcanic material eroded from and deposited downslope of surrounding stratovolcanoes. Locally, the sediments of the Lamar River Formation accumulated in a basin lying between two belts of Eocene volcanoes and at the base of the northern edge of Eocene 'Washburn Volcano'. The Lamar River Formation is part of the Washburn Group.

The Lamar River Formation is part of thick sequence, the Absaroka Volcanic Supergroup, of volcanic rocks erupted from and sediments eroded from two belts of Eocene stratovolcanoes and deposited within an intermountain basin. The Lamar River Formation unconformably lies upon Paleozoic sedimentary rocks and Precambrian crystalline rocks. Dark colored pyroxene andesite lava flows, volcaniclastic rocks, and basalts of the Sunlight Thorofare Creek Group overlie the Lamar River Formation. The Lamar River Formation has been assigned a Middle Eocene age based on radiometric dates and by floral comparisons.

== Yellowstone Petrified Forest ==
A noteworthy feature of Amethyst Mountain are the multiple horizons of well-preserved petrified forests and concentrations of silicified wood found within the Lamar River Formation that is exposed on it slopes. These concentrations of petrified wood are known as the Yellowstone Petrified Forest. Extensive exposures on the northeast slopes of Amethyst Mountain comprise a classic study area, known as the Fossil Forest, that has been studied in detail by a number of researchers for more than 130 years.

Some of the beds contain prehistoric forests buried in place (in situ) by volcanic lahars. Other beds are concentrations of fossilized upright stumps, flat-lying logs, and logs lying at various angles that have been transported from the higher slopes of adjacent volcanoes and buried by braided and meandering streams and volcanic lahars. Notably, virtually identical lahar and stream deposits that contain buried upright standing trunks of forests and beds of transported logs and upright stumps were created by the 1980 eruption of Mount St. Helens, and other Quaternary and Holocene eruptions of other Cascade Range volcanoes. The Late Pleistocene lahar and stream deposits of Mount St. Helens contain buried prehistoric logs and in place (in situ) upright tree trunks that are in the initial stages of being naturally petrified by silica.

Detailed studies of the fossil wood and the Lamar River Formation have greatly revised interpretations of their origin. In the past, these petrified wood accumulations have been classically interpreted to be prehistoric forests buried in place by air-fall volcanic ash and volcanic breccia. As noted above, it is now known that the petrified wood found within the Lamar River Formation is a mixture of material that were either buried in place or transported downslope by lahars and streams. In addition, more recent research has found that the lateral extent of the beds containing either transported wood and stumps or an in place fossil forest is, contrary to assumptions made by earlier studies, quite limited. Instead of being of regional extent as previously thought, these beds are quite limited in extent. The localized distribution of both petrified wood-bearing and fossil-forest beds reflects restricted areas that were buried by individual lahars.

In regard to these fossil forests and other fossils, collecting of fossils in Yellowstone National Park is illegal. In addition, visitors should stay on marked and maintained trails.

== See also ==
- Erling Dorf
- Mountains and mountain ranges of Yellowstone National Park
