= Orange Frazer Press =

Orange Frazer Press is an independent publisher headquartered in Wilmington, Ohio. Founded in 1987, the press is named after Orange Frazer, an Ohio man who ran a grocery store in Wilmington with his brother, John. Frazer also traveled the world, clerked for the Ohio Supreme Court, and collected enough books to create the county's largest library. The company's motto is "Your Story, Beautifully Told."

== History ==
John Baskin and Marcy Hawley both worked at Ohio Magazine in the 1980s, where they accumulated a wealth of minutiae about the Buckeye State. They founded Orange Frazer in order to use the 48 file drawers' worth of information they had, and eventually did so with Ohio Matters of Fact, the company's first published work. The pair sold the books on their own to independent bookstores, and eventually it went through four printings.

Subsequent works included Woody's Boys: 20 Famous Buckeyes Talk Amongst Themselves, a 1995 book about Ohio State football coach Woody Hayes, as well as biographies of Ohio sports figures Johnny Bench, Chad Johnson, and Joe Nuxhall. The Hayes book sold over 25,000 copies, while each of the subsequent biographies sold 20,000 or more.

Today, Orange Frazer Press is Ohio's largest independent book publisher. The company specializes in two niches: regional nonfiction and custom publishing.

== Publication statistics ==
Orange Frazer's subjects generally focus on Ohio, though they have also published works outside of this local scope. First printings range in size from 250 up to 30,000 copies, with commercial projects averaging 3,000 to 5,000. In 2010, ten of the company's 13 releases were custom publications, meaning that the books were privately commissioned and then produced with assistance from Orange Frazer in marketing methods, content production, distribution, etc. Thus far, the company has created over 100 books in this way. In total, the company has published over 300 commercial and custom titles.

Orange Frazer developed four study guides for the Ohio Graduation Tests, tests that every high school student in Ohio must take to graduate. The books were only sold in schools, rather than traditional bookstores, and were written with input from the teachers around the state with backgrounds in math, science, social studies and reading. The project has helped Orange Frazer produce $1.3 million in sales for each of the last two years.

== Highlights of published work ==
- Chad: I Can't Be Stopped by Paul Daugherty
- Before Oprah: Ruth Lyons, The Woman Who Created Talk TV, by Michael Banks
- Rags to Riches: The Story of CINTAS by Richard T. Farmer with William Holstein
- Busted: The Rise and Fall of Art Schlichter, by Art Schlichter
- Earle: A Coach's Life, by Earle Bruce
- Joe: Rounding Third and Heading For Home by Greg Hoard

"100 Days in the Life of Rutherford Hayes" by Eric Ebinger
