= Sendai City Tomizawa Site Museum =

Museum in Sendai, Japan

- 仙台市富沢遺跡保存館
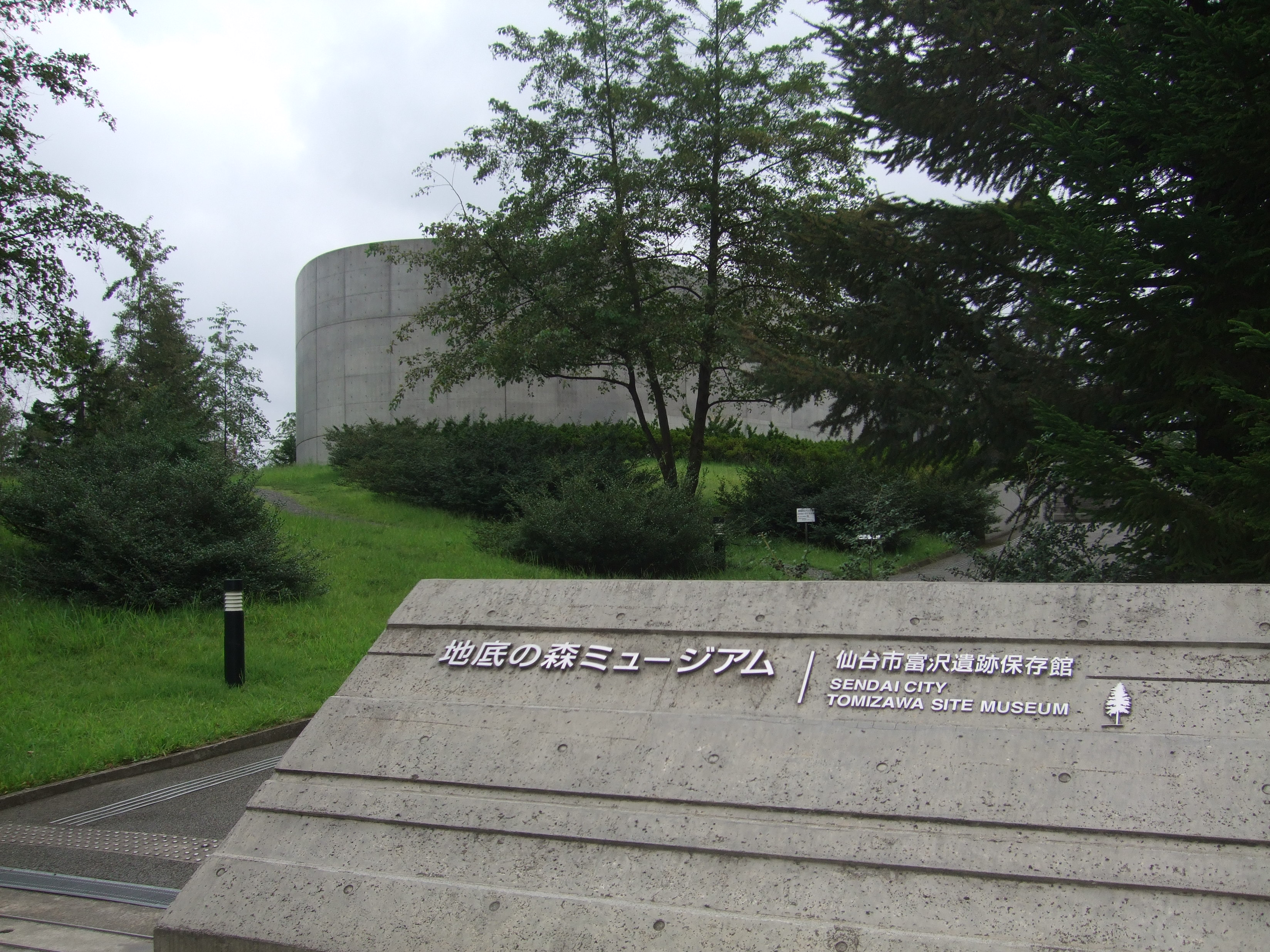
- The Tomizawa Site Museum
- Established: 2 November 1996
- Location: 4-3-1 Nagamachi-minami, Taihaku-ku, Sendai, Miyagi Prefecture, Japan
- Coordinates: 38°13′22″N 140°52′21″E
- Type: Archaeology museum
- Owner: The city of Sendai
- Public transit access: Nagamachi-Minami Station
- Website: www.sendai-c.ed.jp/~bunkazai/~chiteinomori/english/

The Sendai City Tomizawa Site Museum (仙台市富沢遺跡保存館, Sendai-shi Tomizawa iseki hozonkan) is an archaeology museum in the city of Sendai in northern Japan that preserves a fossilized forest, where the remains of human habitation that occurred 20,000 years ago were discovered during surveying work in 1988. The museum opened in 1996.

== Facility ==
The Sendai City Tomizawa Site Museum is a 2,700-square-meter (29,000 ft^{2}) archaeology museum in Taihaku-ku, Sendai. Eighty percent of the building's total area is occupied by exhibition space, with the remaining parts of the facility being used as classrooms and spaces where interactive events are held. These learning spaces are utilized for activities such as the creation of stone implements and learning basic archaeological procedures.

== Exhibit ==
The museum preserves a fossilized forest where the remains of human habitation that occurred 20,000 years ago were discovered. Artifacts from this campsite include small pieces of coalified material from the ancient campfire and hundreds of discarded stone implements. The museum's basement preserves the fossilized forests and remains of the human habitation which had previously been kept intact by ground water. The remains are displayed in a room with a high ovular ceiling that is supported without vertical beams that would obstruct the view of the exhibit. A projection on the walls of the exhibition room displays an interpretation of how the area is theorized to have appeared 20,000 years ago.

== History ==
In 1988, surveys were being conducted in the area of the museum for a proposed elementary school. While the work was being done, the remains of a 20,000 year old campsite were found among the remains of an ancient forest. After the discovery, the plans for the elementary school were allocated to another location. After five years of conceptualization and two years of construction, the museum opened on 2 November 1996.
