= Petrified wood =

Fossilized remains of plants

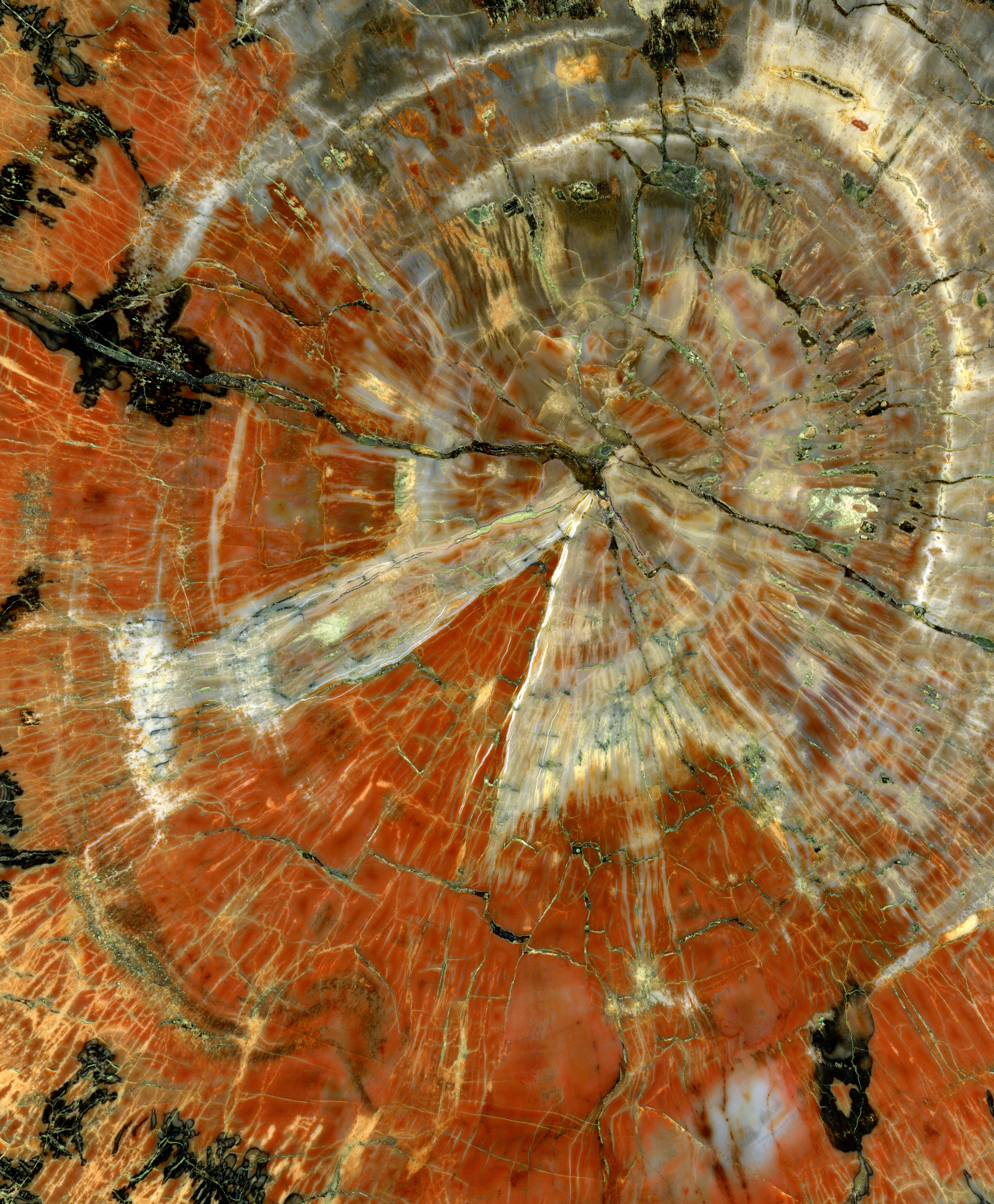
Polished slice of a petrified tree from the Late Triassic Period (approximately 230 million years ago) found in Arizona. The remains of insects can be detected in an enlarged image.

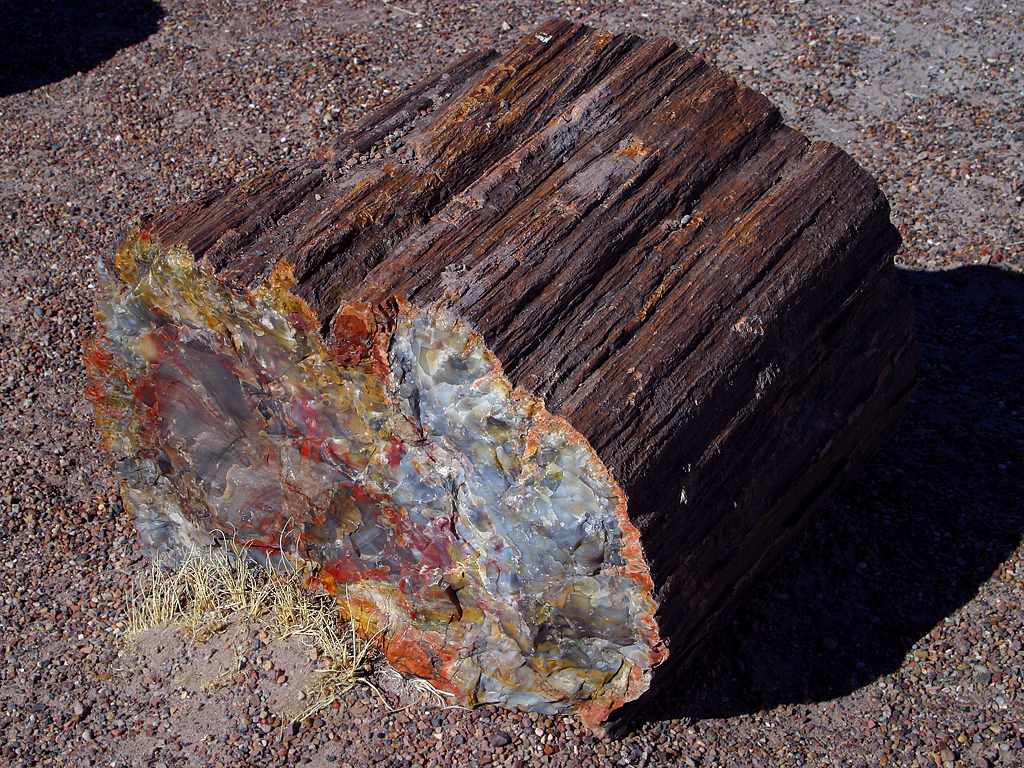
Petrified log at the Petrified Forest National Park

Petrified wood is the name given to a special type of fossilized wood, the fossilized remains of terrestrial vegetation. Petrifaction (from Ancient Greek πέτρα meaning 'rock' or 'stone'), is the result of a tree or tree-like plants having been replaced by stone via a mineralization process that often includes permineralization and replacement. The organic materials making up cell walls have been replicated with minerals (mostly silica in the form of opal, chalcedony, or quartz). In some instances, the original structure of the stem tissue may be partially retained. Unlike other plant fossils, which are typically impressions or compressions, petrified wood is a three-dimensional representation of the original organic material.

The petrifaction process occurs underground, when wood becomes buried in water or volcanic ash. The presence of water reduces the availability of oxygen which inhibits aerobic decomposition by bacteria and fungi. Mineral-laden water flowing through the sediments may lead to permineralization, which occurs when minerals precipitate out of solution filling the interiors of cells and other empty spaces. During replacement, the plant's cell walls act as a template for mineralization. There needs to be a balance between the decay of cellulose and lignin and mineral templating for cellular detail to be preserved with fidelity. Most of the organic matter often decomposes; however, some of the lignin may remain. Silica in the form of opal-A, can encrust and permeate wood relatively quickly in hot spring environments. However, petrified wood is most commonly associated with trees that were buried in fine grained sediments of deltas and floodplains or volcanic lahars and ash beds. A forest where such material has petrified becomes known as a petrified forest.

== Formation ==
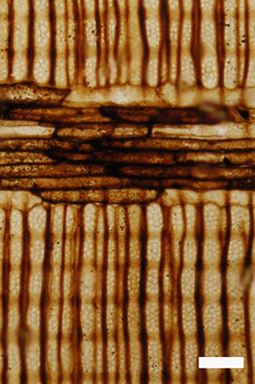
Microscopic view of petrified Callixylon wood

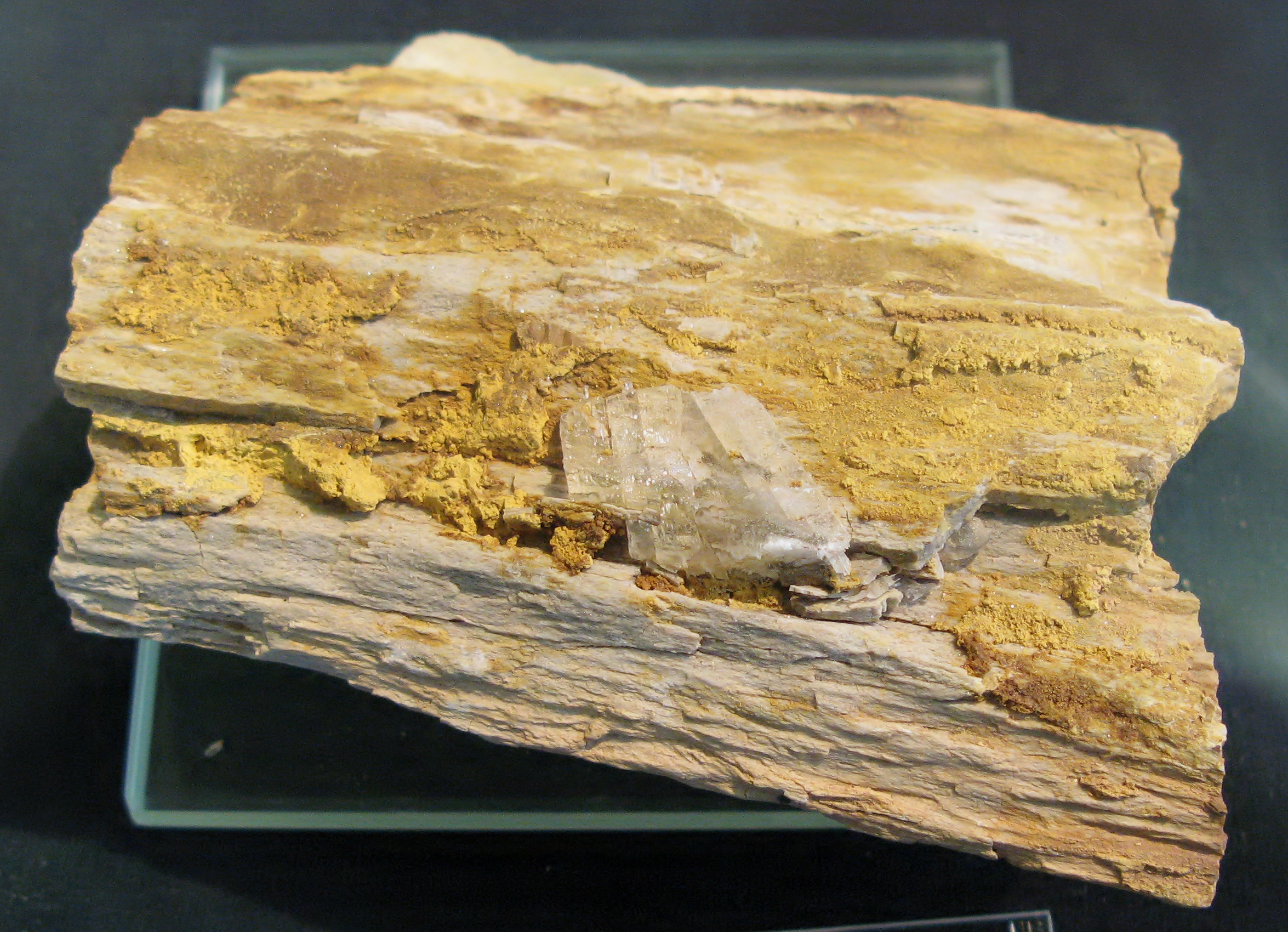
Petrified wood mineralized with carnotite from St. George, Utah

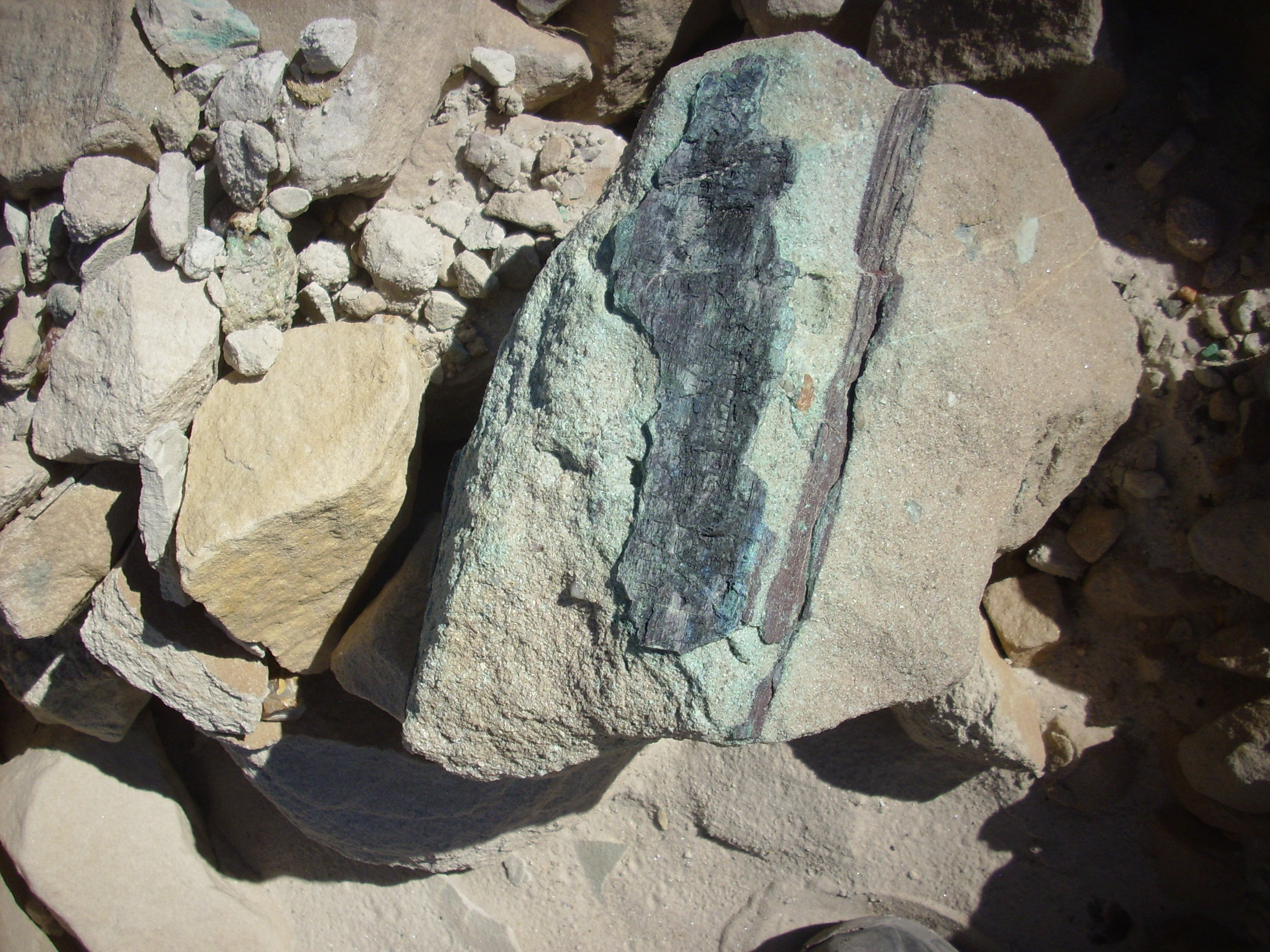
Petrified wood from the Shinarump Formation at the Nacimiento Mine, Cuba, New Mexico. The brown wood at right shows conventional silica mineralization. The black wood at left shows unusual mineralization with chalcocite and other sulfide minerals. The blue-green stains are from oxidation of the chalcocite to azurite and malachite.

Petrified wood forms when woody stems of plants are buried in wet sediments saturated with dissolved minerals. The lack of oxygen slows decay of the wood, allowing minerals to replace cell walls and to fill void spaces in the wood.

Wood is composed mostly of holocellulose (cellulose and hemicellulose) and lignin. Together, these substances make up 95% of the dry composition of wood. Almost half of this is cellulose, which gives wood much of its strength. Cellulose is composed of long chains of polymerized glucose arranged into microfibrils that reinforce the cell walls in the wood. Hemicellulose, a branched polymer of various simple sugars, makes up the majority of the remaining composition of hardwood while lignin, which is a polymer of phenylpropanes, is more abundant in softwood. The hemicellulose and lignin encrust and reinforce the cellulose microfibrils.

Dead wood is normally rapidly decomposed by microorganisms, beginning with the holocellulose. The lignin is hydrophobic (water-repelling) and much slower to decay. The rate of decay is affected by temperature and moisture content, but exclusion of oxygen is the most important factor preserving wood tissue: organisms that decompose lignin must have oxygen for their life processes. As a result, fossil wood older than Eocene (about 56 million years old or older) has lost almost all its holocellulose, and only lignin remains. In addition to microbial decomposition, wood buried in an alkaline environment is rapidly broken down by inorganic reactions with the alkali.

Wood is preserved from decomposition by rapid entombment in mud, particularly mud formed from volcanic ash. The wood is then mineralized to transform it to stone. Non-mineralized wood has been recovered from Paleozoic formations, particularly Callixylon from Berea Sandstone, but this is very unusual. The petrified wood is later exposed by erosion of surrounding sediments. Non-mineralized fossil wood is rapidly destroyed when exposed by erosion, but petrified wood is quite durable.

Some 40 minerals have been identified in petrified wood, but silica minerals are by far the most important. Calcite and pyrite are much less common, and others are quite rare. Silica binds to the cellulose in cell walls via hydrogen bonding and forms a kind of template. Additional silica then replaces the cellulose as it decomposes, so that cell walls are often preserved in great detail. Thus silicification begins within the cell walls, and the spaces within and between cells are filled with silica more gradually. Over time, almost all the original organic material is lost; only around 10% remains in the petrified wood. The remaining material is nearly pure silica, with only iron, aluminum, and alkali and alkaline earth elements present in more than trace amounts. Iron, calcium, aluminum are the most common, and one or more of these elements may make up more than 1% of the composition.

Just what form the silica initially takes is still a topic of research. There is evidence of initial deposition as opal, which then crystallizes to quartz over long time periods. On the other hand, there is some evidence that silica is deposited directly as quartz.

Wood can become silicified within hundreds of years in silica-rich hot springs. While wood petrified in this setting is only a minor part of the geologic record, hot spring deposits are important to paleontologists because such deposits sometimes preserve more delicate plant parts in exquisite detail. These Lagerstätte deposits include the Paleozoic Rhynie Chert and East Kirkton Limestone beds, which record early stages in the evolution of land plants.

Most of the color in petrified wood comes from trace metals. Of these, iron is the most important, and it can produce a range of hues depending on its oxidation state. Chromium produces bright green petrified wood. Variations in color likely reflect different episodes of mineralization. In some cases, variations may come from chromatographic separation of trace metals.

Wood can also be petrified by calcite, as occurs in concretions in coal beds. Wood petrified by calcite tends to retain more of its original organic material. Petrification begins with deposition of goethite in the cell walls, followed by deposition of calcite in the void spaces. Carbonized wood is resistant to silicification and is usually petrified by other minerals. Wood petrified by minerals other than silica minerals tends to accumulate heavy metals, such as uranium, selenium, and germanium, with uranium most common in wood high in lignin and germanium most common in wood preserved in coal beds. Boron, zinc, and phosphorus are anomalously low in fossil wood, suggesting they are leached away or scavenged by microorganisms.

Less commonly, the replacement minerals in petrified wood are chalcocite or other sulfide minerals. These have been mined as copper ore at locations such as the Nacimiento Mine near Cuba, New Mexico.

=== Simulated petrified wood ===
Scientists have attempted to duplicate the process of petrification of wood, both to better understand the natural petrification process and for its possible use as a ceramic material. Early attempts used sodium metasilicate as a source of silica, but tetraethyl orthosilicate has proven more promising.

== Uses ==
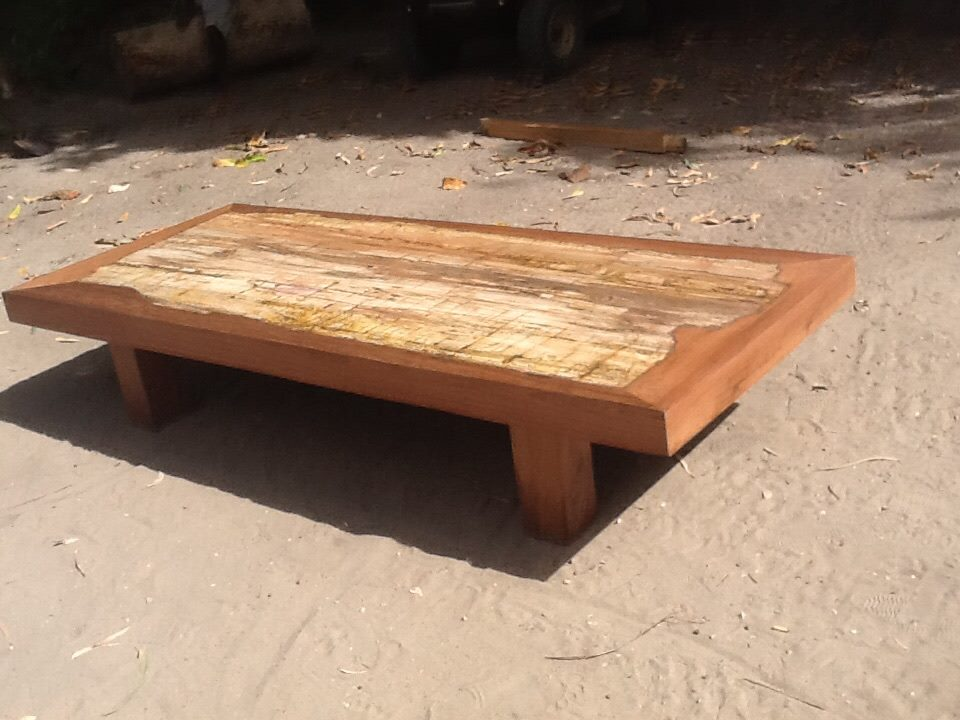
Table constructed from petrified wood

Petrified wood has limited use in jewelry, but is mostly used for decorative pieces such as book ends, table tops, clock faces, or other ornamental objects. A number of Ancestral Puebloan structures near Petrified Forest National Park were constructed of petrified wood, including the Agate House Pueblo. Petrified wood is also used in New Age healing.

== Occurrences ==
Petrified wood is found worldwide in sedimentary beds ranging in age from the Devonian (about 390 million years ago), when woody plants first appeared on dry land, to nearly the present. Petrified "forests" tend to be either entire ecosystems buried by volcanic eruptions, in which trunks often remain in their growth positions, or accumulations of drift wood in fluvial environments. Amethyst Ridge at Yellowstone National Park shows 27 successive forest ecosystems buried by eruptions, while Petrified Forest National Park is a particularly fine example of fluvial accumulations of driftwood.

Volcanic ash is particularly suitable for preservation of wood, because large quantities of silica are released as the ash weathers. The presence of petrified wood in a sedimentary bed is often an indication of the presence of weathered volcanic ash. Petrified wood can also form in arkosic sediments, rich in feldspar and other minerals that release silica as they break down. The warm super monsoon climates of the Carboniferous through Permian periods seem to have favored this process. Preservation of petrified forests in volcanic ash beds is less affected by climate and preserves a greater diversity of species.

Areas with a large number of petrified trees include:

=== Africa ===
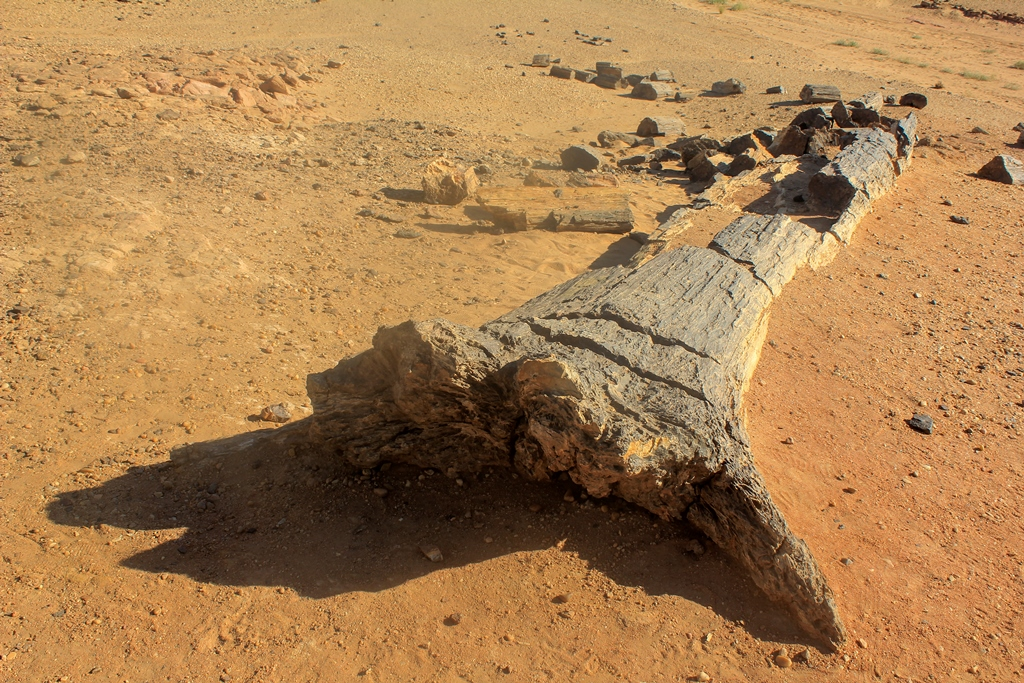
Chunk of petrified wood near El Kurru (Northern Sudan)

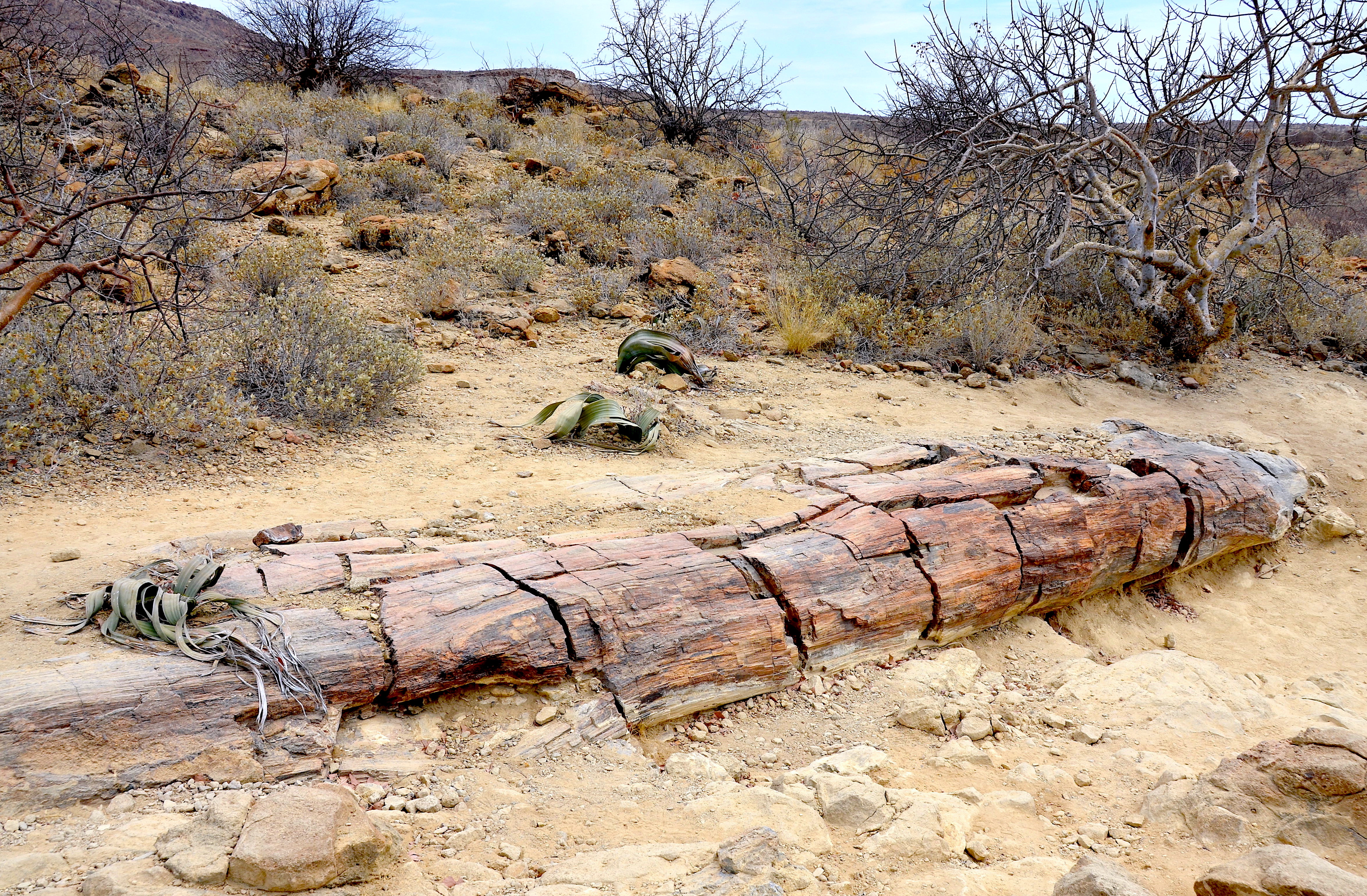
Petrified log and Welwitschia at Namibia Petrified forest

- Egypt – petrified forest in Cairo-Suez road, declared a national protectorate by the ministry of environment, also in the area of New Cairo at the Extension of Nasr City, El Qattamiyya, near El Maadi district, and Al Farafra oasis.
- Madagascar – Northwest Coast
- Namibia – petrified forest of Damaraland
- Sudan – petrified forest north of El-Kurru

=== Asia ===
- China – in the Junggar Basin of Xinjiang, northwest China, the government has issued a crackdown on collecting of this material.
- India – protected geological sites known for petrified wood are the National Fossil Wood Park, Tiruvakkarai (20-million-year-old fossils), and the Akal Wood Fossil Park (180-million-year-old fossils). Petrified wood has also been discovered in Dholavira in Kutch, Gujarat, dating back to 187–176 million years.
- Japan – there is a fossilized forest preserved at Sendai City Tomizawa Site Museum
- Indonesia – petrified wood covers several areas in Banten and also in some part of Mount Halimun Salak National Park.
- Israel – several examples of petrified wood occur in the HaMakhtesh HaGadol in the Negev desert.
- Pakistan – Sindh – Dadu – Petrified Forest at Khirthar National Park
- Saudi Arabia – petrified forest north of Riyadh
- Thailand – Bantak Petrified Forest Park in Ban Tak District has the longest petrified log in the world, officially measuring 69.7 metres.
- Myanmar - The National Kandawgyi Botanical Gardens in Pyin Oo Lwin District has a museum of petrified wood logs and statues.

=== Oceania ===
- Australia – has deposits of petrified and opalized wood. Chinchilla, Queensland is famous for its 'Chinchilla Red'.
- New Zealand:
  - Curio Bay on The Catlins coast contains many petrified wood examples.
  - Fossil Forest, Takapuna, Auckland, New Zealand
  - Titahi Bay Beach, Porirua, New Zealand

=== Europe ===
- Belgium – Geosite Goudberg near Hoegaarden.
- Czech Republic, Nová Paka – The most famous locality on Permian–Carboniferous rocks in the Czech Republic.
- France – petrified forest in the village of Champclauson
- Georgia – Goderdzi Petrified Forest Natural Monument.
- Germany – the museum of natural history in Chemnitz has a collection of petrified trees, from the in situ Chemnitz petrified forest, found in the town in 1737.
- Greece – Petrified forest of Lesvos, at the western tip of the island of Lesbos, is possibly the largest of the petrified forests, covering an area of over 150 km^{2} (58 sq mi) and declared a National Monument in 1985. Large, upright trunks complete with root systems can be found, as well as trunks up to 22 m in length.
- Italy:
  - Foresta fossile di Dunarobba, petrified forest near Avigliano Umbro, Umbria (Central Italy), age Piacenzian.
  - Foresta pietrificata di Zuri – Soddì, petrified forest near Soddì (Province of Oristano, Sardinia), age Chattian–Aquitanian.
- Norway – Fossilized tropical forest in Svalbard
- Ukraine – petrified araucaria trunks near Druzhkivka
- United Kingdom
  - Fossil Grove, Glasgow, Scotland
  - Fossil Forest, Dorset, England

=== North America ===
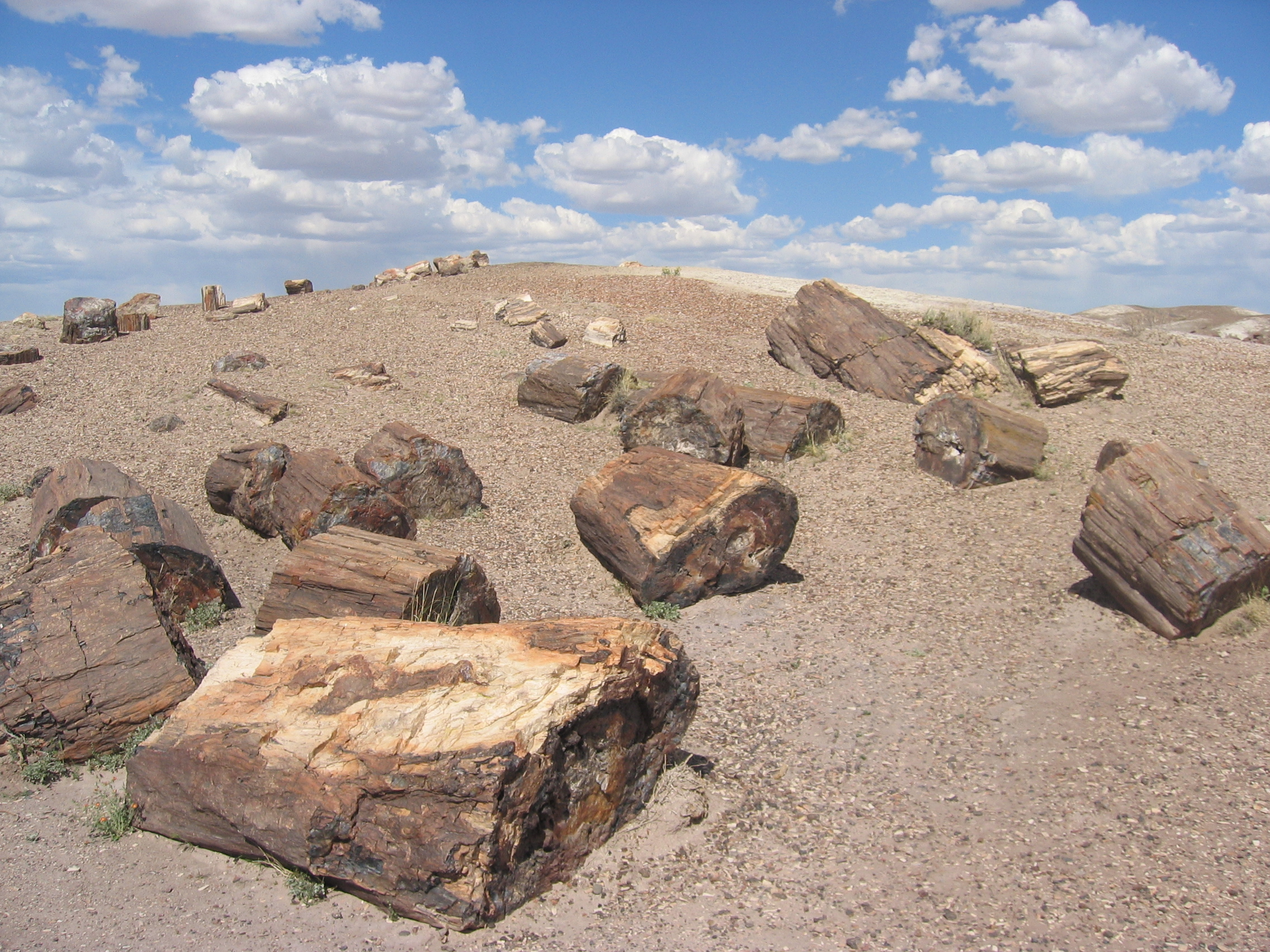
Petrified logs at Petrified Forest National Park, Arizona, United States

- Canada – in the badlands of southern Alberta; petrified wood is the provincial stone of Alberta. Axel Heiberg Island in Nunavut has a large petrified forest. In and around the North Saskatchewan river, around the Edmonton area. Blanche Brook, in Stephenville, Newfoundland, has 305-million-year-old examples.
- United States
  - Petrified Wood Park in Lemmon, South Dakota
  - Ginkgo/Wanapum State Park in Washington state
  - Petrified Forest National Park in Arizona
  - Petrified Forest in California
  - Mississippi Petrified Forest in Flora, Mississippi
  - Cherokee Ranch petrified forest
  - Florissant Fossil Beds National Monument near Florissant, Colorado
  - Yellowstone Petrified Forest and Gallatin Petrified Forest, Yellowstone National Park, Wyoming
  - The south unit of Theodore Roosevelt National Park outside Medora, North Dakota
  - Gilboa Fossil Forest in New York
  - Athens County, Caesar Creek, Hueston Woods, Ohio
  - Black Hills Petrified Forest in South Dakota
  - Escalante Petrified Forest State Park in Utah
  - Agate Desert in the Upper Rogue River Valley near Medford, Oregon
  - Fossil Forest in the Catskill region near Cairo, New York
  - Valley of Fire State Park in Nevada
  - Bisti Badlands in New Mexico
  - Prince William Forest Park in Virginia

=== South America ===
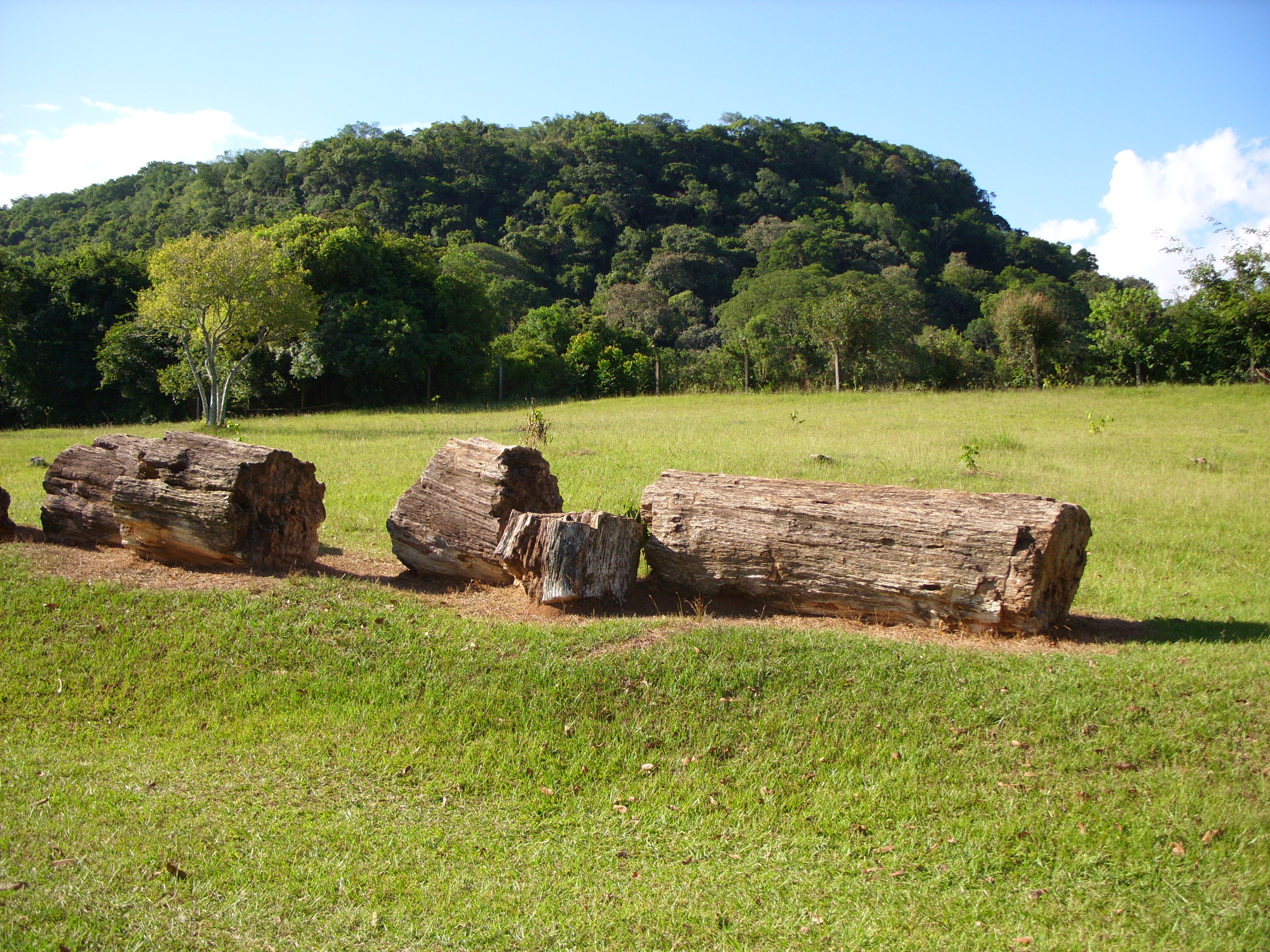
Petrified log in Paleorrota geopark, Brazil

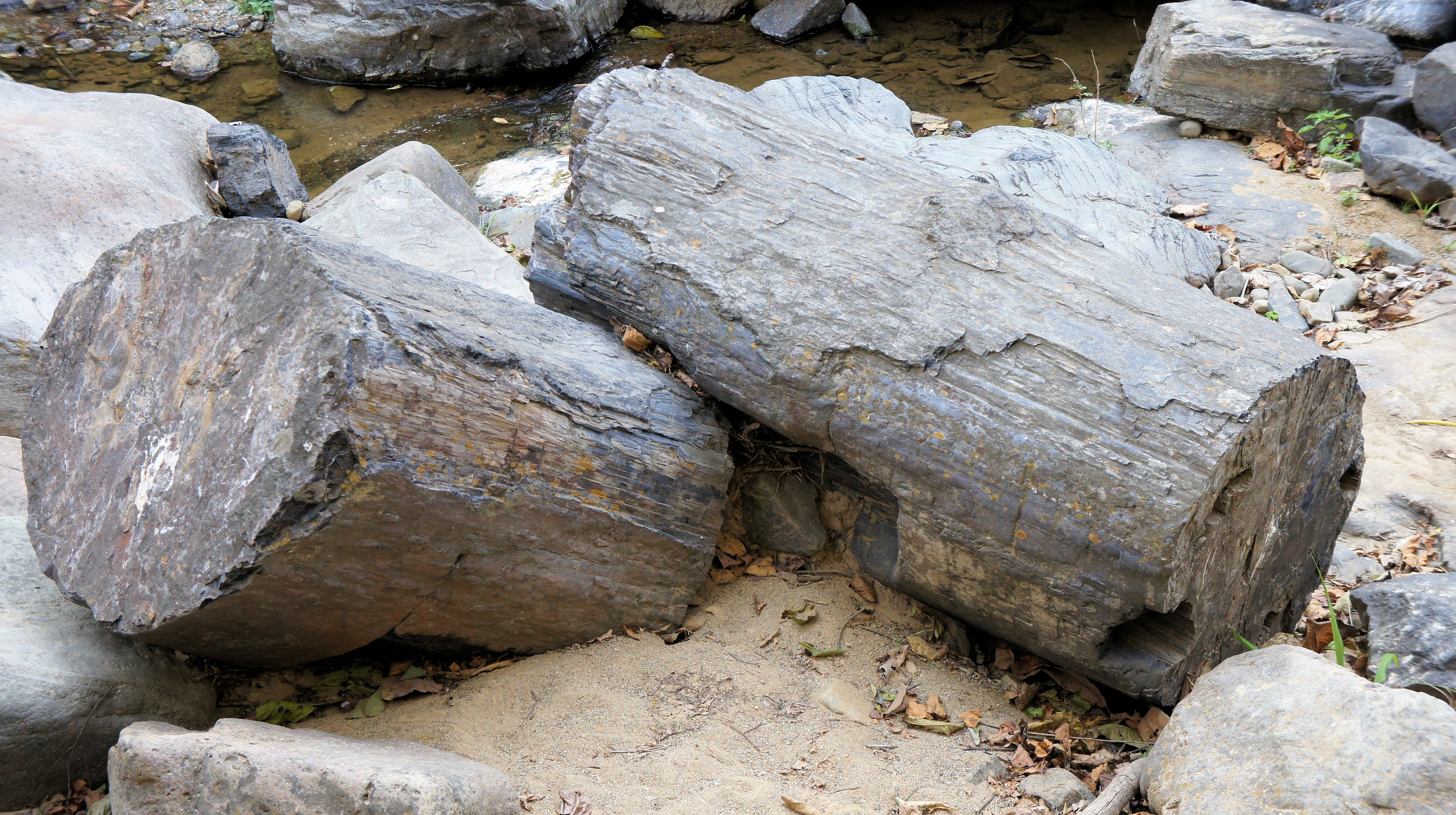
Puyango petrified forest, Ecuador

- Argentina – the Sarmiento Petrified Forest and Jaramillo Petrified Forest in Santa Cruz Province in the Argentine Patagonia have many trees that measure more than 3 m (9.8 ft) in diameter and 30 m (98 ft) long.
- Brazil:
  - in the geopark of Paleorrota, there is a vast area with petrified trees.
  - In the Heritage forest
  - Monumento Natural das Árvores Fossilizadas ('Fossil Trees Natural Monument') in Tocantins: petrified forests of dicksoniaceae (specifically Psaronius and Tietea) and arthropitys
  - Petrified forests of dicksoniaceae (specifically Psaronius and Tietea singularis) and arthropitys can also be found in the state of São Paulo
  - Floresta Fóssil de Teresina near Rio Poti, Piauí, Permian (around 280–270 million years ago).
- Ecuador – Puyango Petrified Forest – One of the largest collections of petrified wood in the world.

== See also ==
- Amber
- Amethyst Mountain
- Araucarioxylon arizonicum
- Fossil wood
- Jet (gemstone)
- Palmoxylon (petrified palmwood)
- Submerged forest
- Wood opal
