= New Burlington (book) =

New Burlington: The Life and Death of an American Village
- First edition
- Author: John Baskin (writer)
- Subject: Rural history
- Genre: Non-fiction
- Published: 1976 (W.W. Norton)
- ISBN: 0-393-08366-7

New Burlington (full title: New Burlington: The Life and Death of an American Village) is a 1976 non-fiction book by John Baskin. The work documents the lives and histories of the residents of New Burlington, Ohio, in the year before the village was flooded by a reservoir. The book received broad critical acclaim, noted for its unique poetic and literary tone. It is recognized for its contributions to the fields of history and sociology. The book was a Book of the Month Club selection and an American Library Association Notable Books for Adults award winner.

== History ==
In 1967, the Army Corps of Engineers began construction on a dam on the Cesar Creek, a tributary to the Little Miami River in southwest Ohio to provide flood control for the towns on the river. The plans called for creating the Caesar Creek Lake reservoir, which would flood the small farming village of New Burlington, Ohio. John Baskin was working for the newspaper the Cincinnati Enquirer, Cincinnati, Ohio at the time, and read an article about the planned death of the village. Baskin became interested in the history of the community and the lives of its residents, and he began seeking funding to write a book. In 1972, he was named an Alicia Patterson Foundation fellow and used the grant money to move to New Burlington.

By the time Baskin arrived in New Burlington, residents had been given one year to relocate. He moved into an abandoned farmhouse left behind and spent the next year living and working with the people while collecting their stories and histories.

== Synopsis ==
New Burlington tells the story of the land comprising New Burlington, Ohio, and its people. The book is primarily structured as a series of chapters focused on more than thirty middle-aged and elderly residents. In each chapter, Baskin weaves the words of the residents together with collected letters and diaries from the past, and threads of his own observations running throughout. The books explores the feelings of loss, acceptance, nostalgia, and disorientation experienced by the residents as they faced the death of their community.

== Reception and influence ==
The critical reception of New Burlington was broadly positive, even effusive. Harrison Salisbury at The New York Times wrote “a better eulogy to real American people has never been written,” and Roger Velhust at Newsday said, “What Baskin has done is preserve the heritage not merely of one small town, but of the American village that no more than a few generations ago was home to almost all of us.” The renowned psychiatrist and author Robert Coles wrote in The New Yorker that New Burlington’s “…landscape, its people, and their traditions and customs, their experiences, victories, and defeats, and their abiding memories have been given new life in this rare moral document written by an imaginative observer.”

Many reviewers noted the unique poetic and literary tone of the book. Author Larry Woiwode, also in The New York Times, wrote, “This is an ambitious and moving book, packed with vision, humor, and wisdom,” and the book drew comparisons to many popular examples of rural fiction, such as Winesburg, Ohio, Under Milk Wood, and Spoon River.

New Burlington has been recognized in the academic literature for both its historic and sociological significance. Robert Coles used the book in his courses at Harvard University, and profiled it in his textbook Doing Documentary Work.

In 2006, the book was adopted into a play by Jonathan Walker and performed at the Chautauqua Institute featuring Emmy Award-winning actress Sada Thompson.
