= John Baskin (non-fiction writer) =

American writer and editor

John Edward Baskin (born May 22, 1941) is an American writer and editor best known for his 1976 nonfiction book, New Burlington: The Life and Death of an American Village. The book chronicles the final year of the small farming village New Burlington, Ohio, before it was flooded by the construction of a reservoir. The book was recognized as a Book of the Month Club selection, and is an American Library Association Notable Books for Adults award winner. Baskin is the co-founder of Orange Frazer Press.

== Life and work ==
Baskin was born in Greenville, South Carolina, on May 22, 1941, attended Mars Hill College in western North Carolina, then studied with Fred Chappell in the University of North Carolina at Greensboro's MFA program.

Baskin went to work as a journalist when he was 21, covering, among other things, Civil Rights demonstrations in the furniture towns of Piedmont North Carolina, including the notable Lexington riot of 1963 when one man died and Baskin's companion, photographer Art Richardson, was shot in the back.

He worked for a series of daily newspapers from Asheville and Greensboro in North Carolina to Dayton, Ohio. In 1972, Baskin was named an Alicia Patterson Foundation fellow, using the grant to move into an abandoned farmhouse and became the last resident of the farming village of New Burlington, Ohio, before it was flooded by the construction of a reservoir.

Baskin lived in New Burlington for its final year, interviewing residents and studying the letters and histories of generations of New Burlington inhabitants. This resulting book--New Burlington: The Life and Death of an American Village--received critical acclaim and is considered a distinguished example of rural American history. In 2006, the book was adopted into a play by Jonathan Walker and performed at the Chautauqua Institute featuring Emmy Award-winning actress Sada Thompson.

For more than a decade he was a freelance writer, contributing articles and essays to the New York Times, The Nation, Mother Jones, The Yale Review, Harper's Weekly, LA Weekly, Mother Earth News, and the Washington Post, and other publications. His essays were collected in a W.W. Norton book, In Praise of Practical Fertilizer.

Baskin was editorial director of Ohio magazine, and in 1987 he co-founded publishing company Orange Frazer Press in Wilmington, Ohio. He has also been the recipient of a Ford Foundation award for Humanistic Perspectives on Contemporary Society.

== Works ==
- New Burlington: The Life and Death of an American Village, W.W. Norton, 1976. ISBN 9780393320206
- In Praise of Practical Fertilizer, essays, W.W. Norton, New York, 1982. ISBN 9780393015638
- Our Town: A Celebration (chapbook), Steeplejack Press, Northampton, Massachusetts, 1988.
- The Cincinnati Game, Orange Frazer Press, Wilmington (with Lonnie Wheeler), 1988. ISBN 9780961963729
- Legends, Orange Frazer Press, Wilmington (with Lonnie Wheeler), 2009. ISBN 9781933197555
