= Erling Dorf =

American geologist and Paleobotanist

Erling Dorf was an American geologist. He was born July 19, 1905, and died in April 1984. He was hired in 1928 as a professor of geology at Princeton University. He retired from Princeton in 1974. He was a renowned paleobotanist working on the floras of the Late Cretaceous and Paleogene. He was married to Ruth Kemmerer Dorf. They had three sons and a daughter: Thomas Alfred Dorf (1937-1958), Norman Kemmerer Dorf (1938-2007), Robert "Bob" Erling Dorf (1941- ) and Molly Dorf Purrington (1948 - ).

Probably his best known research today are comprehensive articles and papers about the Yellowstone Petrified Forest where he reported the presence of conglomerates from stream deposits, breccias from mudflows or landslides, volcanic tuff from the numerous volcanic events, and lava beds. Dorf theorized that these specimens do not merely represent one entombed forest but rather include trees from 27 separate forests (the most in the world), each stacked on top of the other, layer by layer, to a thickness of 1,200 feet (370 m). He explains that the Absaroka volcanism lasted for 15 million years. In that time, there were alternating periods of activity and dormancy. The active periods caused trees to be encased and eventually fossilized. During the ensuing dormancy, new trees grew up on top of the old, only to be encased by the next volcanic activity.

The genus Erlingdorfia and a lake in Beartooth Pass are named after him. The name of the monotypic eurypterid genus Dorfopterus from the Devonian of Wyoming, in the United States, also honors Dorf.

== Publications ==
- Dorf, Erling and Irma E. Webber "Studies of the Pliocene Palaeobotany of California" Contributions to Palaeontology. Carnegie Institution of Washington Publication No. 412 (1933)
- Chaney, Ralph Works and Erling Dorf "Ecology of the Tertiary forests of western North America" Proceedings of the Geological Society of America, pp. 357, Jun 1934
- Dorf, Erling and John R. Cooper "Early Devonian Plants from Newfoundland" Journal of Paleontology, Vol. 17, No. 3, pp. 264–270. May, 1943
- Dorf, Erling and Steven K. Fox "Cretaceous and Cenozoic of the New Jersey Coastal Plain" Prepared for the 1957 annual meeting of the Geological Society of America and associated societies." 1957
- Dorf, Erling "Climatic changes of the past and present" American Scientist, vol.48, no.3, pp. 341–364, 1960
- Dorf, Erling "The petrified forests of Yellowstone Park" Scientific American, vol.210, no.4, pp. 106–112, 1964
- Dorf, Erling "Cretaceous Insects From Labrador I. Geologic Occurrence," Psyche, vol. 74, no. 4, pp. 267–269, 1967
- Dorf, Erling "The fossil forests of yellowstone park" Science and Children, vol.7, no.6, pp. 15–17, 1970
- Dorf, Erling "Early Tertiary fossil forests of Yellowstone Park" from Rock mechanics, the American Northwest. Pennsylvania State University Press, pages 108–111. 1974
- Dorf, E. "Climatic changes of the past and present" in the book, Paleobiogeography from the series (edited by C.A. Ross), Benchmark papers in geology. Dowden, Hutchinson & Ross, Inc., Pages 384-412 (1976)
- Dorf, Erling "Petrified forests of Yellowstone: Yellowstone National Park, Wyoming, Montana, and Idaho" National Park Service Handbook No. 108 (1980)

== Awards and honors ==
- 1943 - Vice-President, The Paleontological Society
- A dormitory has been named after him at the Yellowstone-Bighorn Research Association.

== See also ==
- Amethyst Mountain
- Specimen Ridge
