= Caesar's Creek Pioneer Village =

Coordinates: 39°29′08″N 84°02′15″W

- Established: 1978
- Location: Waynesville, Ohio
- Website: www.ccpv.us

Caesar's Creek Pioneer Village is a historically recreated community in Caesar Creek State Park, located in Waynesville, Ohio, United States. The village was formed when historic buildings were moved here in 1978 in order to save them from destruction from the creation of Caesars Creek Lake.

The village consists of an open-air collection of over 15 restored log cabins and other buildings from the 18th century and early 19th century. The log buildings are open during special events, but can be viewed from the outside year round. The village is maintained and operated by a private non-profit organization. The buildings include a Quaker meetinghouse, a broom shed, a pioneer school house, blacksmith shop, carpenter shop, toll house and many family houses. This includes the historic 1803 Elam Log Cabin.
