= Caesar Creek (Ohio) =

Stream in Ohio, United States

- Map
- Location within Ohio

Location
- Country: United States
- State: Ohio
- Counties: Clinton, Greene, and Warren

Physical characteristics
- Source
  - location: Greene County
  - coordinates: 39°41′44″N 83°40′54″W
- Mouth: Little Miami River
  - location: Jamestown, Ohio
  - coordinates: 39°29′36″N 84°06′16″W

Caesar Creek is a stream in Clinton, Greene, and Warren counties, Ohio, in the United States.

Caesar Creek was named for a surveyor's black slave who died and was buried along the creek's banks.

Caesar Creek is dammed in Caesar Creek State Park to form Caesar Creek Lake.

== Location ==
- Mouth: Confluence with the Little Miami River at 39°29′36″N 84°06′16″W
- Source: Greene County, Ohio at 39°41′44″N 83°40′54″W

== See also ==
- List of rivers of Ohio
