= Caesar Creek State Park =

State park in Ohio, United States

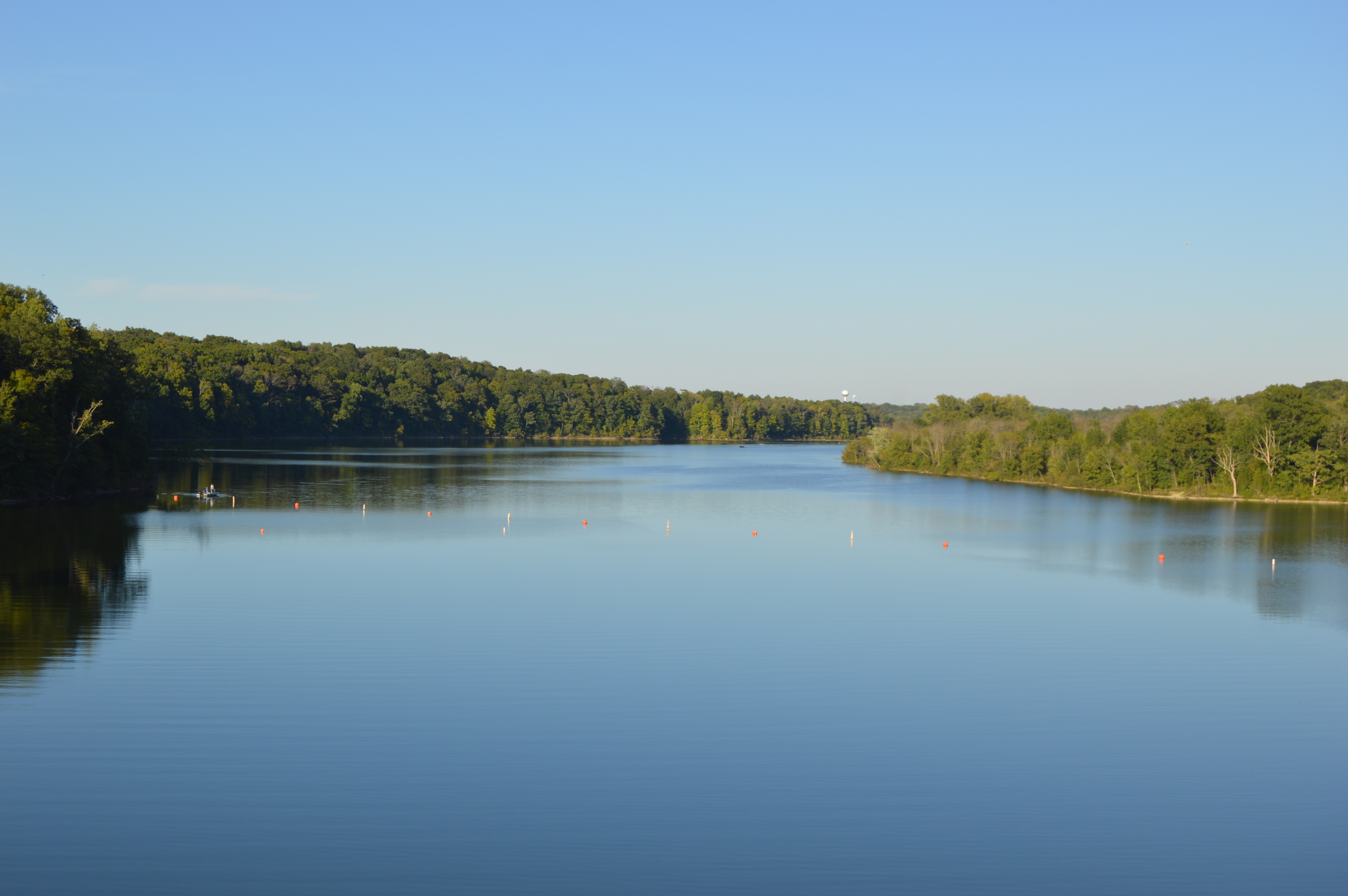

- Location within Ohio Location within the United States
- Location: Clinton, Greene & Warren counties, Ohio, United States
- Coordinates: 39°29′30″N 84°02′21″W
- Area: Land: 4,700 acres (1,900 ha); Water: 2,830 acres (1,150 ha)
- Elevation: 843 ft (257 m)
- Established: 1978
- Administrator: Ohio Department of Natural Resources
- Designation: Ohio state park
- Website: Caesar Creek State Park

Caesar Creek State Park is a public recreation area located in southwestern Ohio, five miles (8 km) east of Waynesville, in Warren, Clinton, and Greene counties. The park is leased by the State from the U.S. Army Corps of Engineers, who in the 1970s erected a dam on Caesar Creek to impound a 2,830-acre (1,150 ha) lake. The total park area, including the lake, is 7,530-acre (3,050 ha).

Fossil collection is allowed at Caesar Creek State Park with the following restrictions: No tools allowed, no fossil collecting for commercial use, all fossils kept must fit in the palm of your hand, and all fossil collection must take place in the designated fossil collection zone.

== Amenities ==
- The park has 43 miles (69 km) of hiking trails and 31 miles (50 km) of bridle trails.
- Caesar's Creek Pioneer Village - a collection of over 15 log cabins and other structures that are open during special events. The village is maintained and operated by a private non-profit organization. The buildings include a Quaker meetinghouse, a broom shed, a pioneer school house, blacksmith shop, carpenter shop, toll house and many family houses. They do many programs throughout the year including a maple syrup making program.
- Caesar Creek Nature Center - Adjacent to the Pioneer Village, the nature center features exhibits on the area's cultural and natural history. Nature education programs are offered year round, including campouts, hikes, cast iron cooking classes, and wildlife education.
- Community-Built Watercraft Racks - On the lakeside of the state park campground, there are multiple canoe and kayak racks built by Boy Scouts as Eagle Scout projects. Included is a canoe rack built by Springboro Troop 7 and Cincinnati Troop 420, led by Noah Kaun from Troop 7, in May of 2025.

== Dam ==
The dam is an earth and rock fill dam 165 feet (50 m) high and 2,750 feet (840 m) long. The Army Corps site is an area of 10,550 acres (4,270 ha). The watershed above the dam has an area of 237 square miles (61,000 ha). Construction started in 1971 and was finished in 1978.

The Army Corps site states:

"Congress authorized Caesar Creek Lake under the Flood Control Act of 1938. The Louisville District of the U.S. Army Corps of Engineers designed, built, and operates Caesar Creek Lake.
"During the fall and winter months, the lake level is lowered to prepare for the storage of heavy spring rainfall. If heavy rains occur, surface water runoff is stored in the lake until the swollen streams and rivers below the dam have receded. Once they can handle the discharge of the stored water without damage to lives or property, the extra water is released."

The site is in the Warren County townships of Massie and Wayne.

== Flooding of New Burlington ==
The construction of the Caesar Creek Lake flooded the small farming village of New Burlington, Ohio in 1978. The history of the community was collected through stories, letters, and journals in the book New Burlington: The Life and Death of an American Village by John Baskin.

== Sources ==
- John Baskin. New Burlington: The Life and Death of an American Village. New York: W. W. Norton, 1976. ISBN 0-393-08366-7
- Ohio. Department of Natural Resources. Division of Geological Survey. Excursion to Caesar Creek State Park in Warren County, Ohio. By Douglas L. Shrake. Geological Survey Guidebook No. 12. Columbus, Ohio: The Department, 1992
- United States Department of Agriculture. Natural Resources Conservation Service. Caesar Creek Watershed, Miami Valley Resource Conservation and Development Area : Clinton, Greene, and Warren Counties, Ohio. Fort Worth, Texas: The Service, 1995.
- United States. Department of the Army. Corps of Engineers. Louisville District. Final Updated Environmental Impact Statement: Caesar Creek Lake Project, Ohio. Louisville, Kentucky: The Corps, 1974.
- Art Weber. Ohio State Parks. Saginaw, Michigan: Glovebox Guidebooks, 1995. ISBN 1-881139-04-2.
