= New Burlington, Clinton County, Ohio =

Former town in Ohio, U.S.

Coordinates: 39°33′43″N 83°57′56″W

New Burlington is a former town located in Chester Township in the northwestern corner of Clinton County, Ohio, off Ohio State Route 380. The GNIS classifies it as a populated place. It was acquired by the United States federal government when Caesar Creek was dammed and a reservoir created in the 1970s.

== History ==
New Burlington was laid out in 1833, and named after Burlington, North Carolina, the native home of a share of the first settlers. A post office called New Burlington was established in 1837, and remained in operation until 1971. New Burlington was a "station" on the Underground Railroad.

== Gallery ==
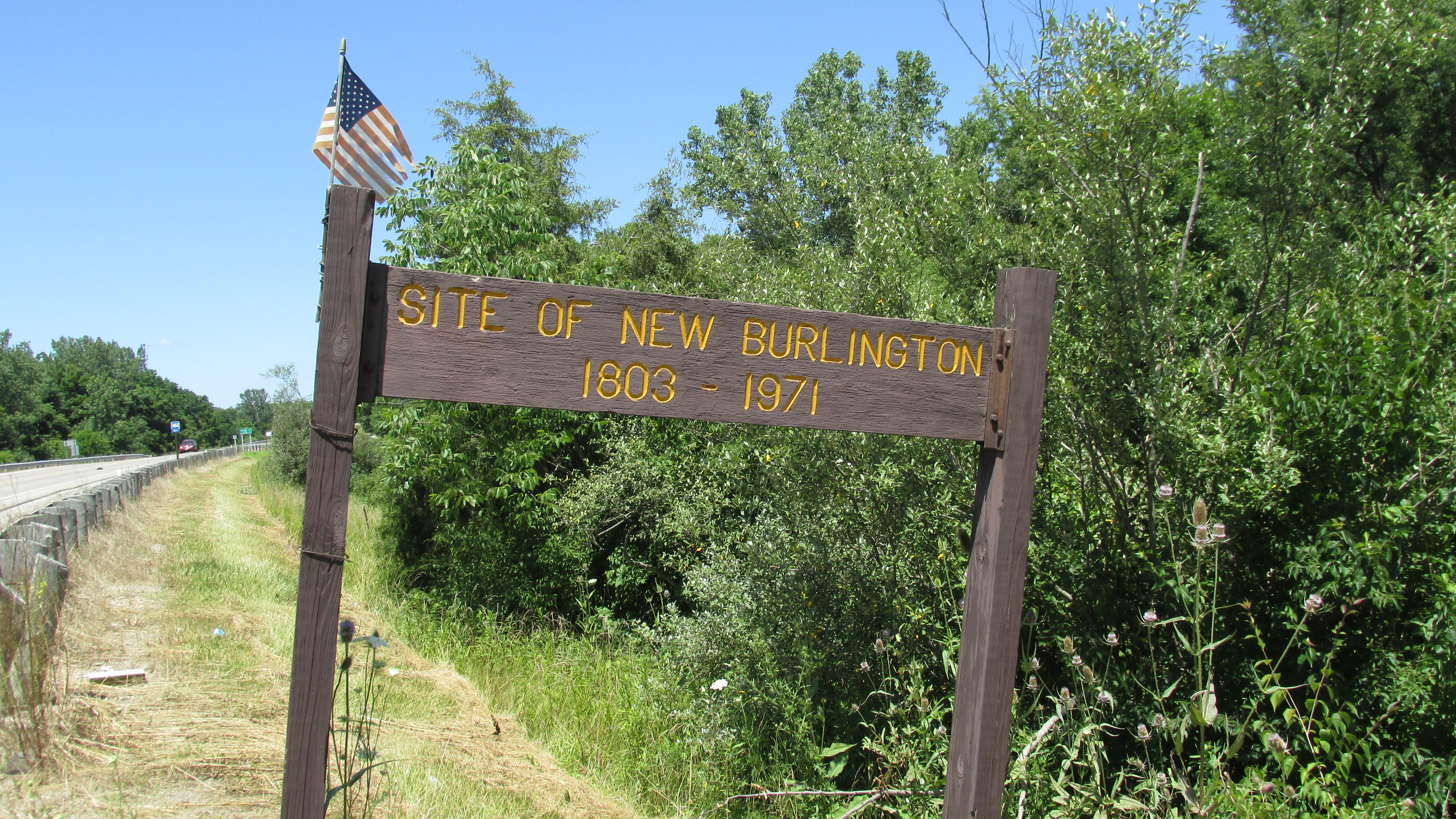
Site of New Burlington (1803–1971) located on Ohio State Route 380

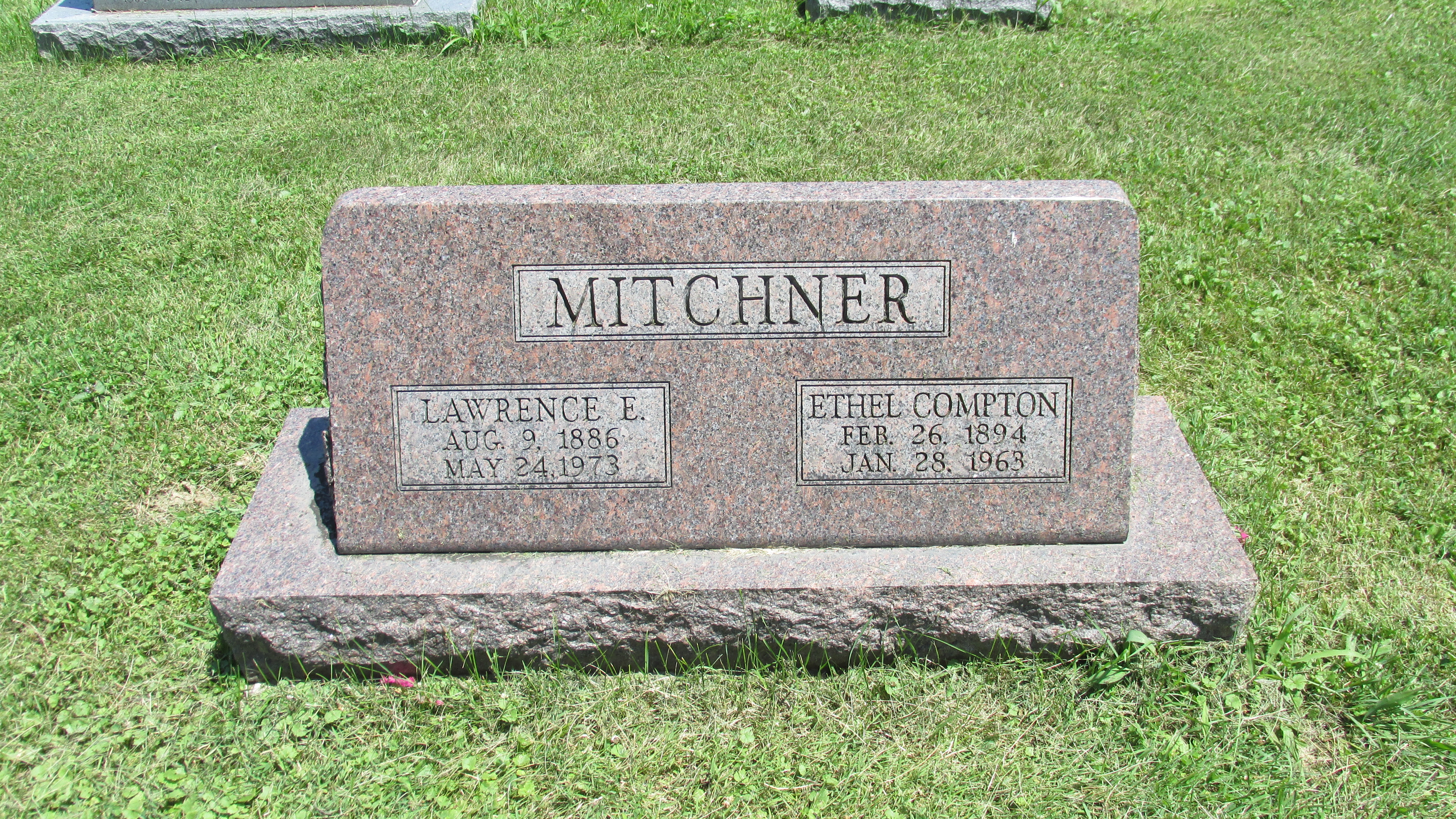
Headstone of Lawrence E. & Ethel Compton Mitchner located in New Burlington Cemetery

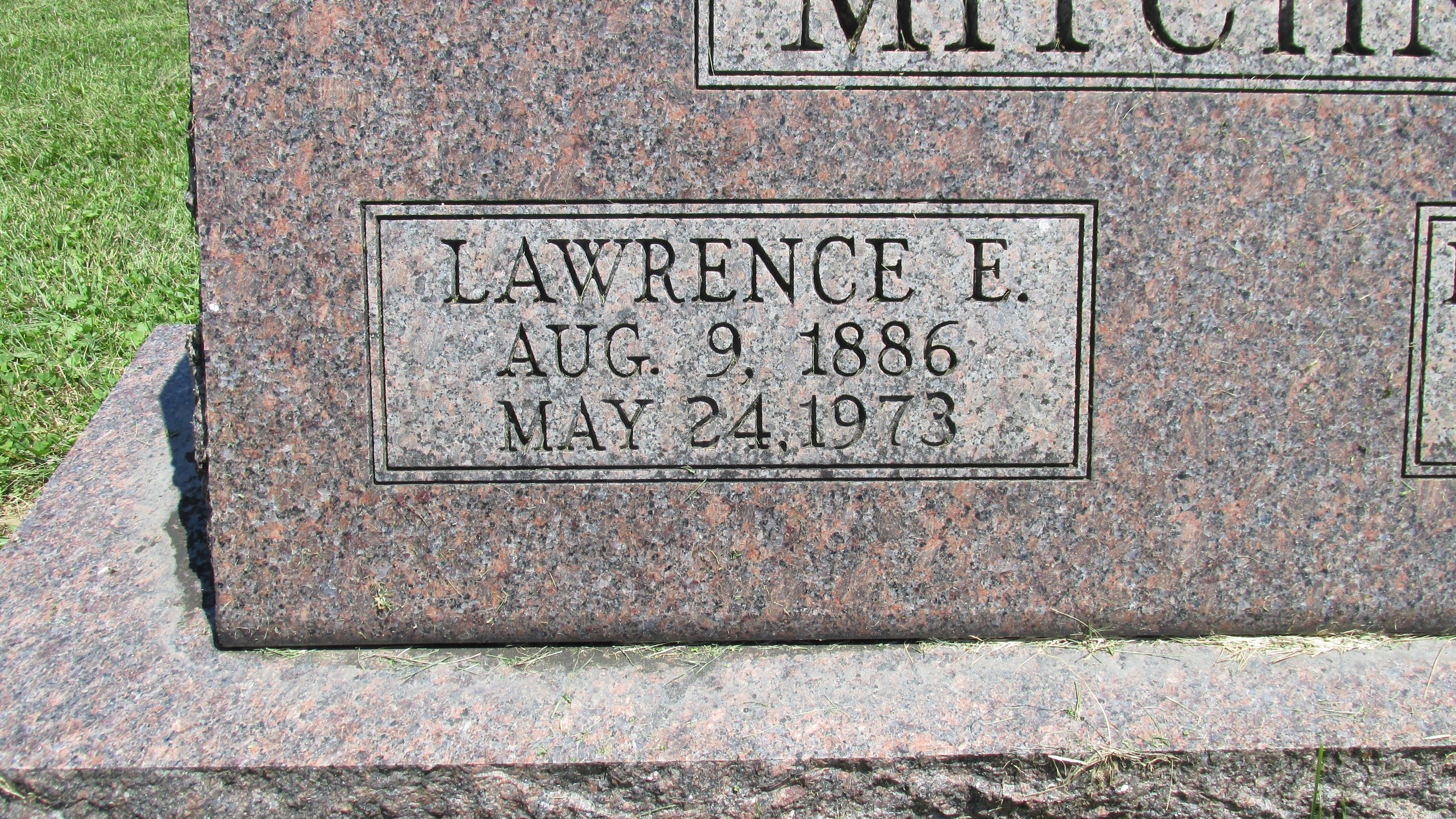
Grave of Lawrence E. Mitchner, the last remaining resident of New Burlington
