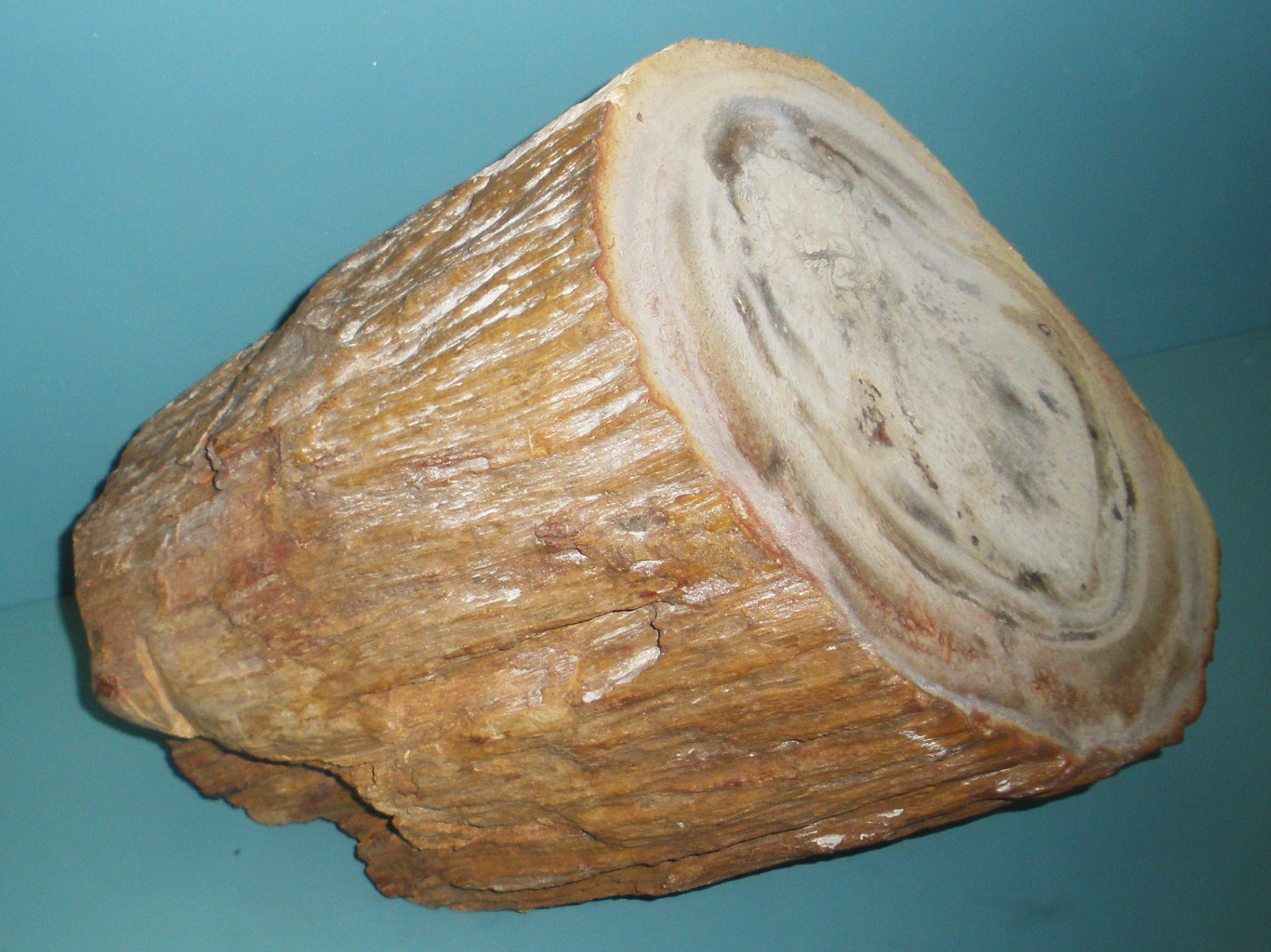

Scientific classification
- Kingdom: Plantae
- Clade: Tracheophytes
- Division: Polypodiophyta
- Class: Polypodiopsida
- Order: Marattiales
- Family: †Psaroniaceae
- Genus: †Tietea; Solms-Laubach

Species
- Tietea derbyi Herbst; Tietea singularis Solms-Laubach

= Tietea =

Tietea Temporal range: Late Carboniferous–Permian

Extinct species of fern

Tietea was a genus of marattialean tree ferns from the Late Carboniferous to the Permian. The genus has been placed in a number of families, including Psaroniaceae. The first described species was Tietea singularis, which grew up to 12 metres (39 ft) in height. It is estimated to represent close to 90% of some fossil assemblages in Brazil. Tietea derbyi was described in 1992, but its validity has been questioned as it could be a laterally flattened specimen of T. singularis.

== Description ==
Tietea singularis stems usually are less than 20 centimetres (7.9 in) in diameter, bearing four orthostichies of leaves in a decussate arrangement. The stem is surrounded by a continuous ring of sclerenchyma that separates it from the root mantle. T. singularis stem transverse sections have the same basic structure as Psaronius, but are composed of central vascular bundles having smaller, O- and C-shaped forms, or wavy segments having a short, rounded or fat configuration. Leaf traces are polymeristelic in Tietea, while they are monomeristelic in Psaronius. The Tietea root mantle is composed of polyarch roots embedded in a parenchymatous tissue that is produced both by the stem and the roots.

== Distribution ==
The preserved examples of Tietea singularis from Pedra do Fogo Formation, in the Maranhão Basin (northeastern Brazil, near Araguaína) exhibit remarkable cell preservation and exquisite coloration. Much of the recovered wood material from this formation is of the tree ferns Psaronius and T. singularis, with fewer examples of the fossilized stems being of Calamites. Conifers such as Dadoxylon are also found.

Tietea singularis is also seen abundantly in the Motuca Formation, Parnaíba Basin in Filadélfia, Tocantins. In 2000, the area of the Motuca formation was transformed into a Natural monument, the Monumento Natural das Árvores Fossilizadas-MONAF (Tocantins Fossil Trees Natural Monument).
