= Gymnascella dankaliensis =

Scientific classification
- Kingdom: Fungi
- Division: Ascomycota
- Class: Eurotiomycetes
- Order: Onygenales
- Family: Gymnoascaceae
- Genus: Gymnascella
- Species: G. dankaliensis

Binomial name
- Gymnascella dankaliensis (Castell.) Currah

Species of fungi

Gymnascella dankaliensis is a moderate to slow growing fungus commonly found in the soil of warmer climates. It is characterized by round yellow, orange or red-brown ascospores encircled by undifferentiated filaments. They have been found in ear, nail and skin infections. Their metabolites have been isolated and shown to have cytotoxic and anti-tumor properties .

== Morphology ==
Colonies vary greatly in colour, texture and growth rate. Colonies first appear white, then turn a pale yellow or olive and as they mature become yellow-brown to orange brown. The texture can be either cottony, fine, knotted or wispy. Growth rate of colonies varies from moderately slow to rapid.

Gymnascella dankaliensis has irregular, indistinct filaments.

== Ecology ==
Gymnascella dankaliensis has been reported in the soil of climates and the marine sponge Halichondria japonica.

== Metabolites ==
Since the late 1990s, multiple cytotoxic compounds have been isolated from Gymnascella dankaliensis such as:
