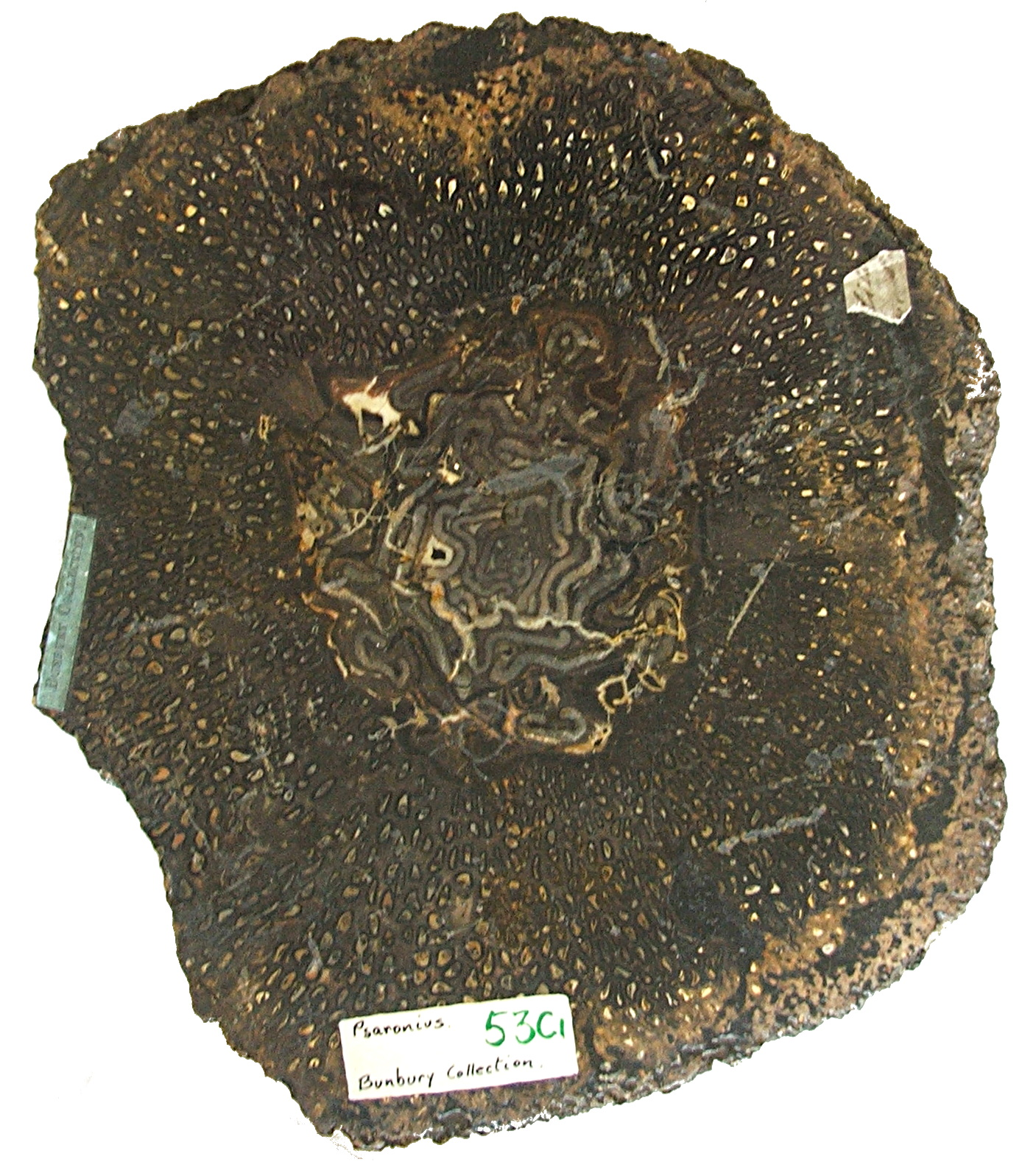
- A transverse section through a Psaronius stem. ~12cm across.
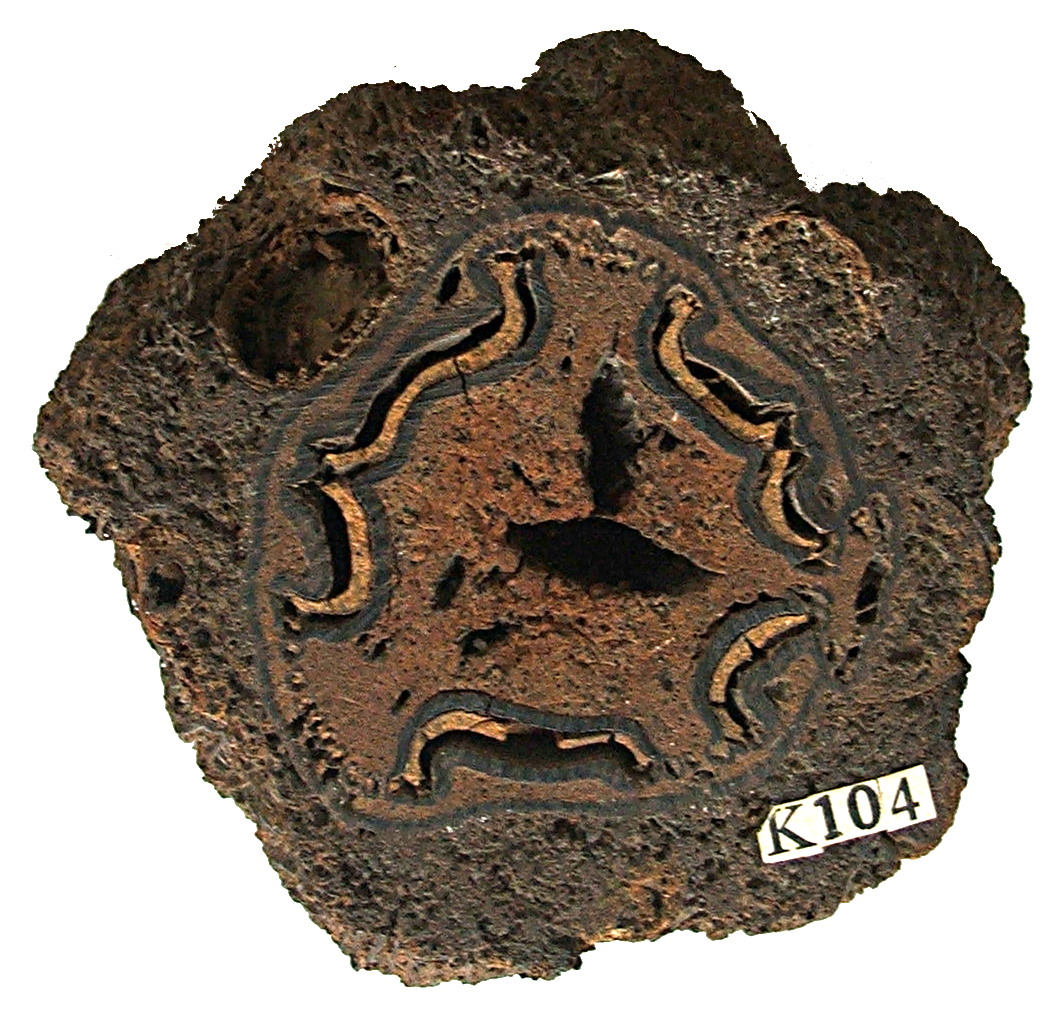
- An equivalent section through a modern tree fern. ~6cm across.

Scientific classification
- Kingdom: Plantae
- Clade: Tracheophytes
- Division: Polypodiophyta
- Class: Polypodiopsida
- Order: Marattiales
- Family: †Psaroniaceae
- Genus: †Psaronius; Cotta

= Psaronius =

Psaronius Temporal range: Late Carboniferous–Permian

Genus of ferns

Psaronius is an extinct genus marattialean tree fern which grew to 10m in height, and is associated with leaves of the organ genus Pecopteris and other extinct tree ferns. Originally, Psaronius was a name for the petrified stems, but today the genus is used for the entire tree fern. Psaronius tree fern fossils are found from the Carboniferous through the Permian.

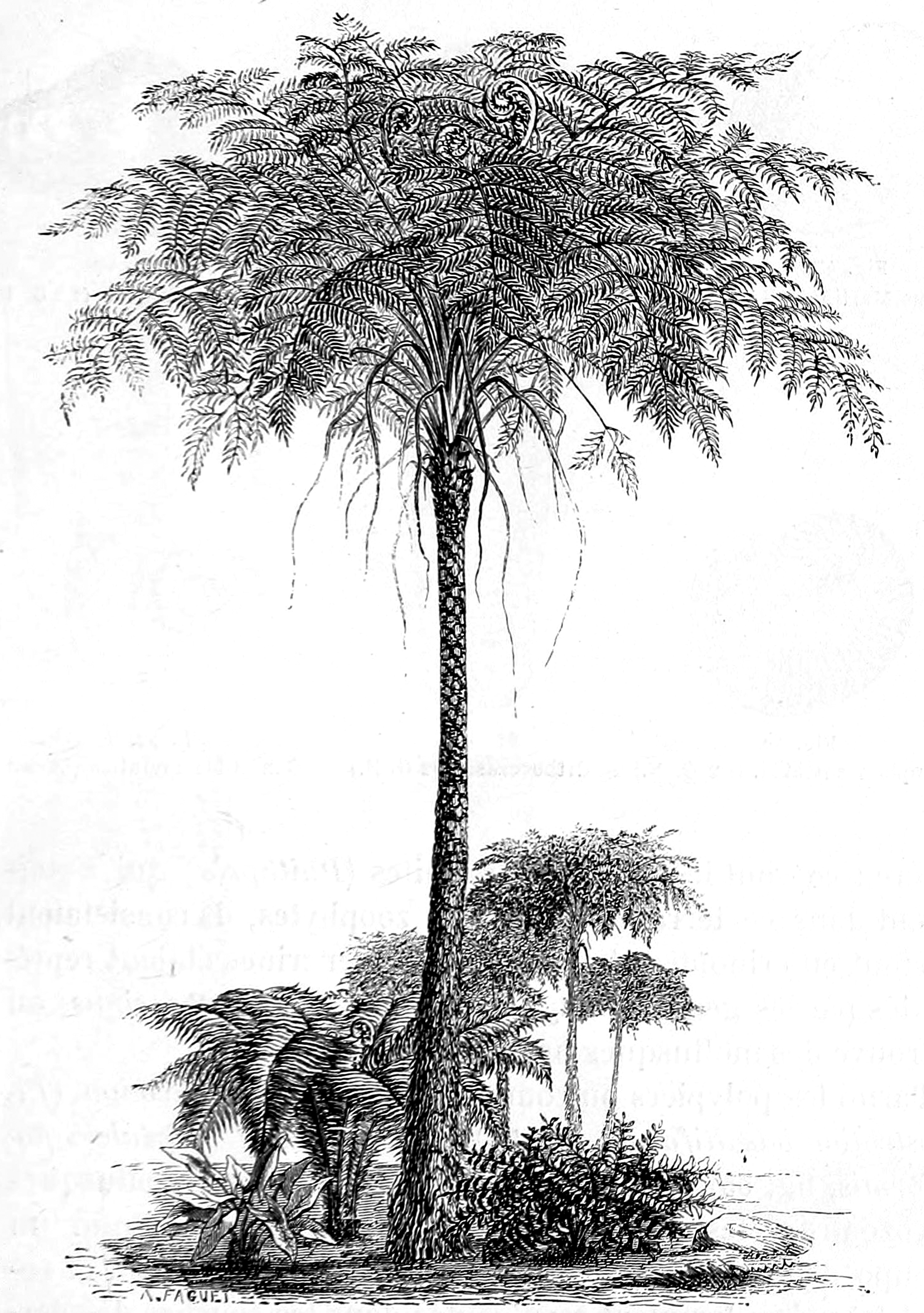
Reconstruction of Psaronius, Illustrated by Auguste Faguet (1877)

== Etymology ==
The word Psaronius comes from the Greek ψαρονιος (psaronius, precious stone) the root of which is ψαρον (psaron, a starling bird.] The stone was used for ornamental purposes in Europe and acquired the name for its resemblance to the speckled pattern of the starling. In Germany, the stone was called staarstein. And in English, it was called either starry-stone or starling stone.

== Description ==
Like many extinct trees, psaronius is known by various individual fossil parts that are not always found together. The main parts include: the root mantle, the stem, the fronds, the coziers (fiddleheads), and leaves with spores.

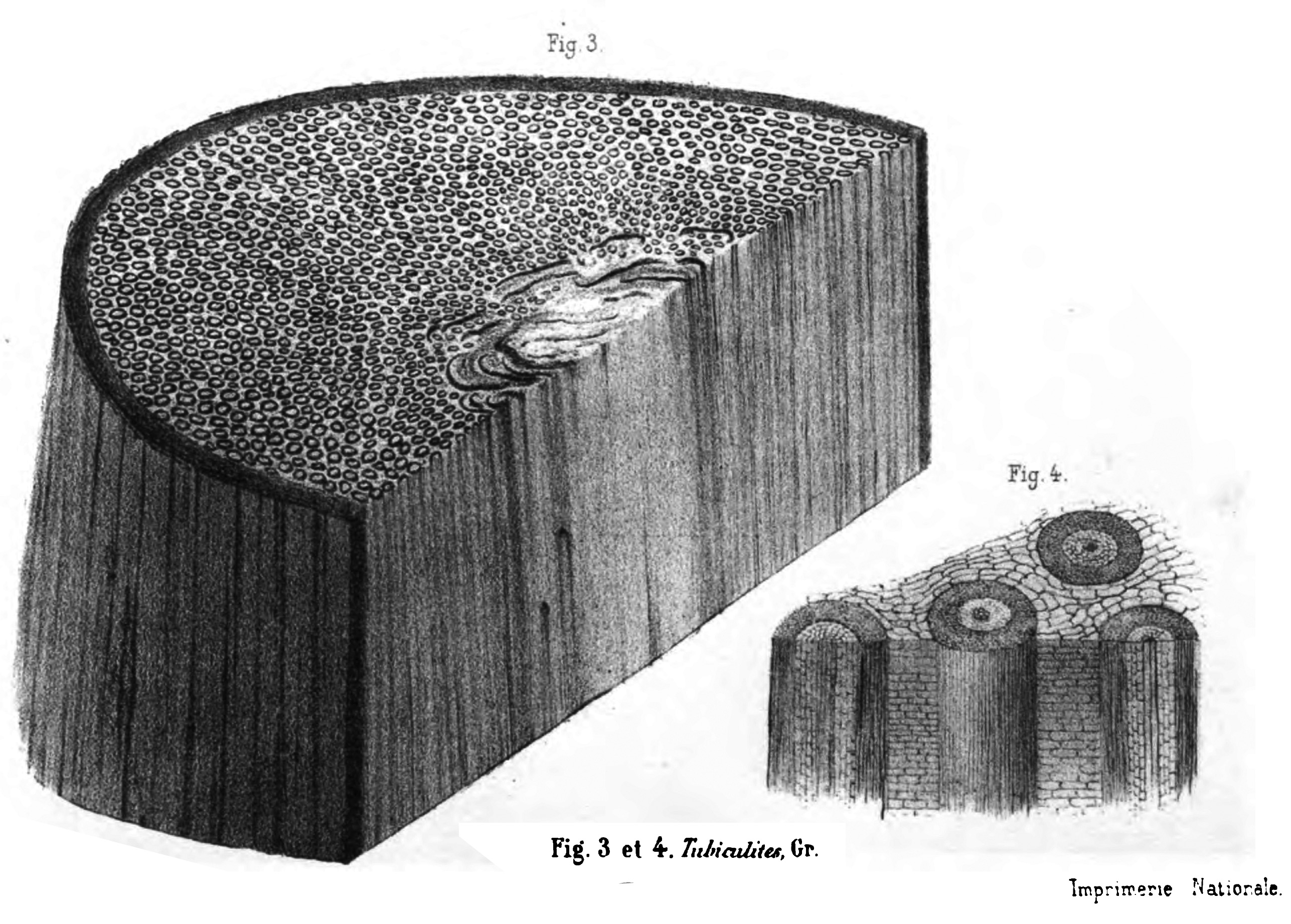
Tubiculites, the fossilized impressions of the rootlets of the Carboniferous fern called Psaronius.

=== Root mantle ===
An unusual feature is that Psaronius did not have a true trunk, but had a massive root mantle formed by hundreds of rootlets. These rootlets are referred to as adventitious because they are appearing in an atypical location. These adventitious roots originate in a central stem high in the tree. This central stem becomes smaller lower in the tree so that at the base the mantle is composed entirely of roots. In some specimens, this mantle is over 1.0 m in diameter at the base of the tree. The fossilized wood of this root mantle is simply referred to as Psaronius. The side impressions of these adventitious roots are referred to as Tubiculites by the French Geologist François Cyrille Grand'Eury in 1877.

=== An ecosystem in the Psaronius root mantle ===
Like modern tree ferns, Psaronius included other plant species growing in the root mantle. It has been determined through cross-sections of petrified Psaronius, that various vining and epiphytic plants were growing within the tree fern. Some Carboniferous plant species are only known from their fossilized remains within these root mantles. Some of these that have been studied extensively are the epiphyte Botryopteris, the vining climber Ankyropteris and the small climbing ferns called Tubicaulis.

=== Fronds and leaves ===
The leaves most often associated with Psaronius are those known as Pecopteris, but some species of Psaronius bore Sphenopteris foliage. Fossil of the croziers (or fiddleheads) of the fern fronds have been found. They sometimes go by the name Spiropteris. The study of croziers associated with psaronius wood have been used to determine foliage associations. The fronds were often bipinnate and sometimes tripinnate. Other leaf taxon associated with Psaronius include: Asterotheca, Acitheca, Remia and Radstockia.

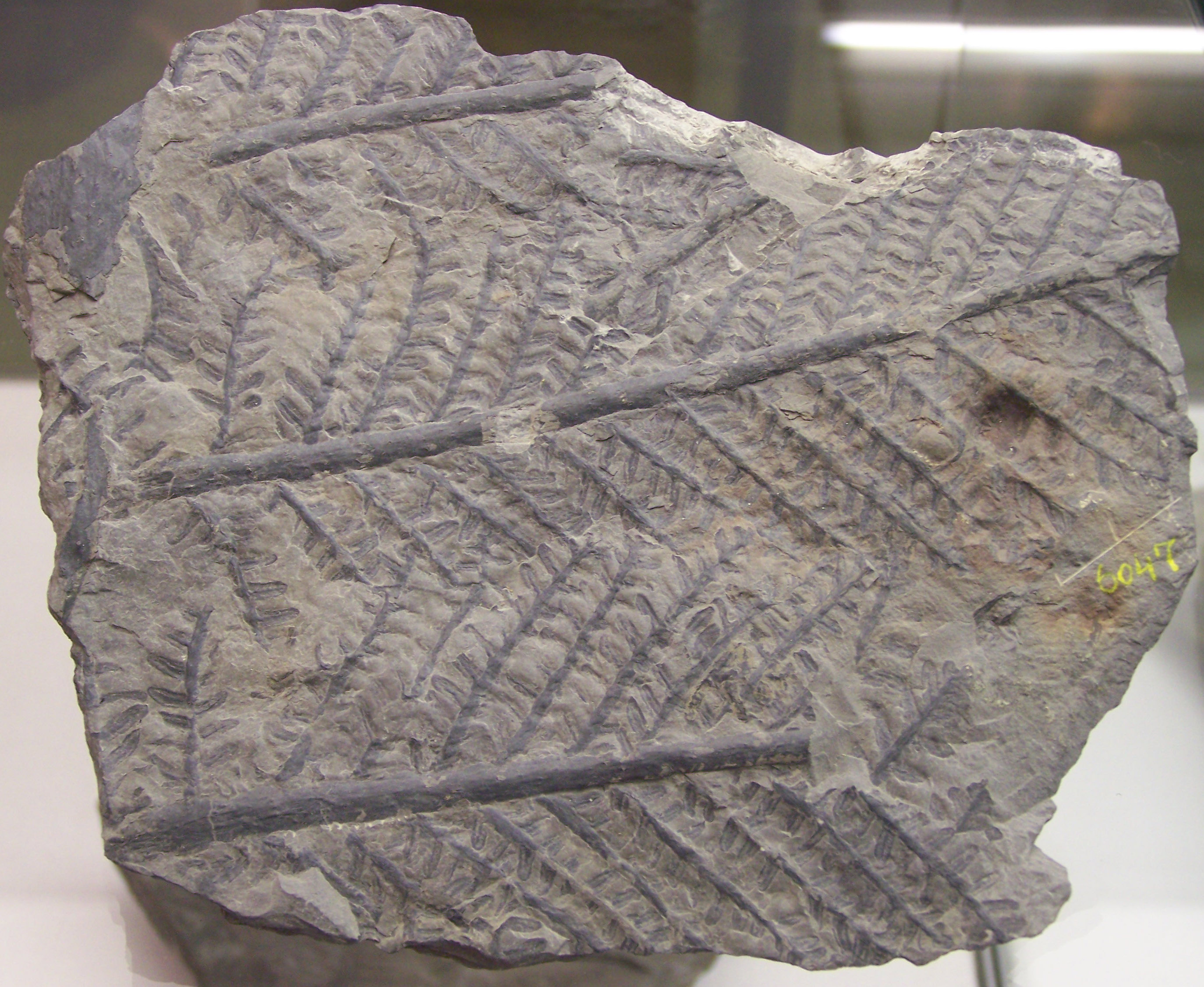
Pecopteris polymorpha

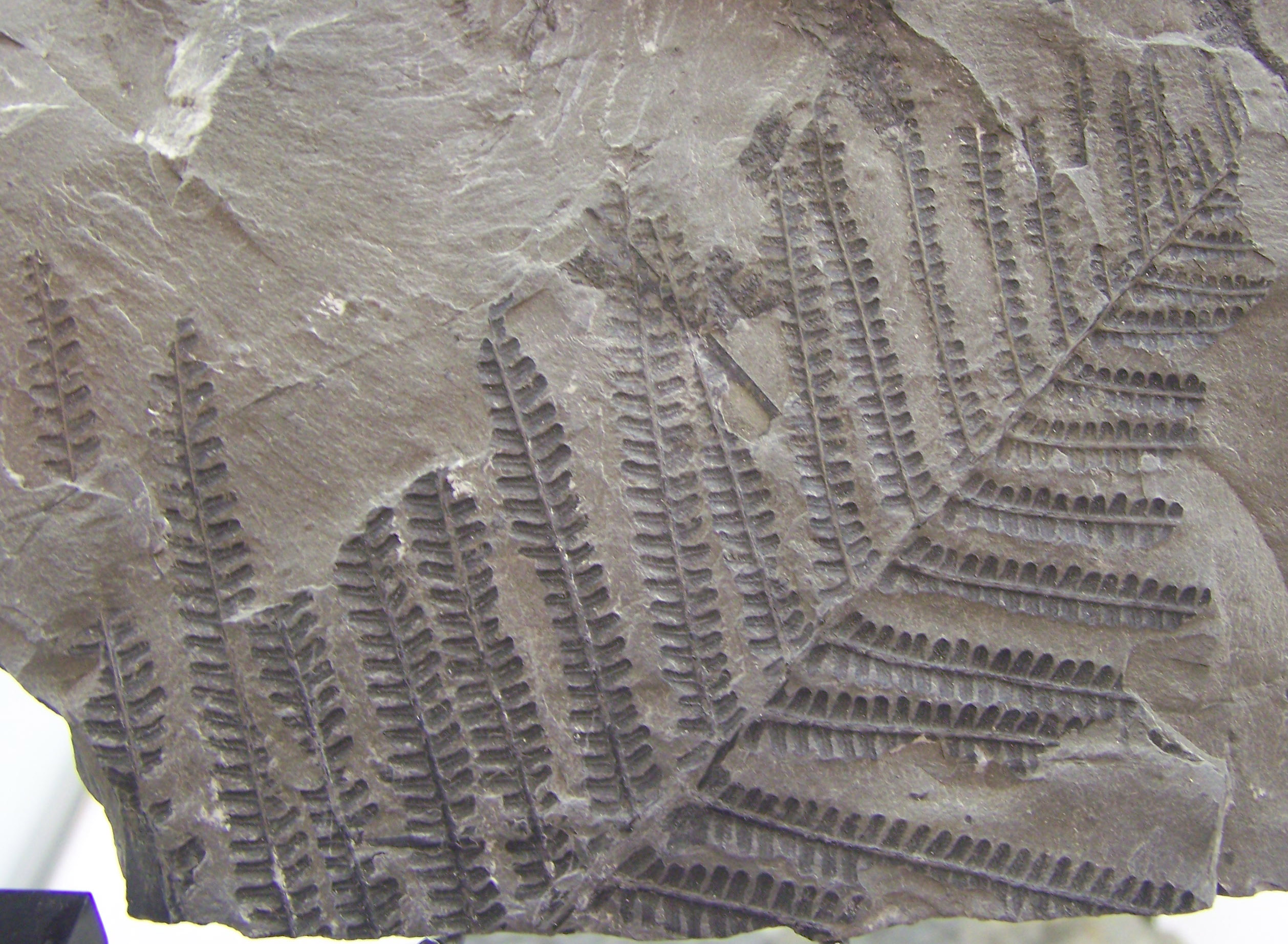
Pecopteris arborescens

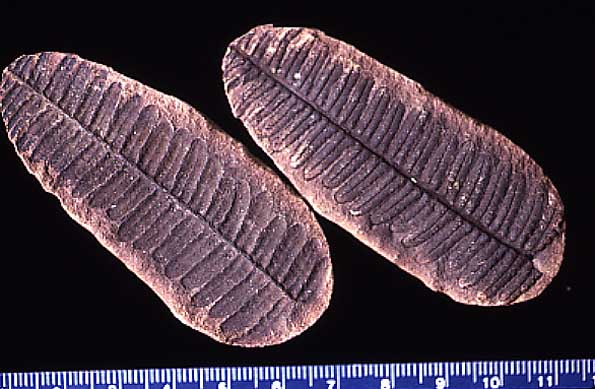
Pecopteris villosa

=== Leaf scar ===
The bases where the leaves attached were thick to carry the weight of fronds that could attain the size of 2 to 3 meters. stem scars. When fronds abscised from Psaronius, they left elliptical scars on the surface of the stem. Fossils of these leaf scars appear in different arrangements which may indicate different species of trees. These scars are known as Caulopteris, Megaphyton, Hagiophyton, and Artisophyton based on the four main arrangement patterns.

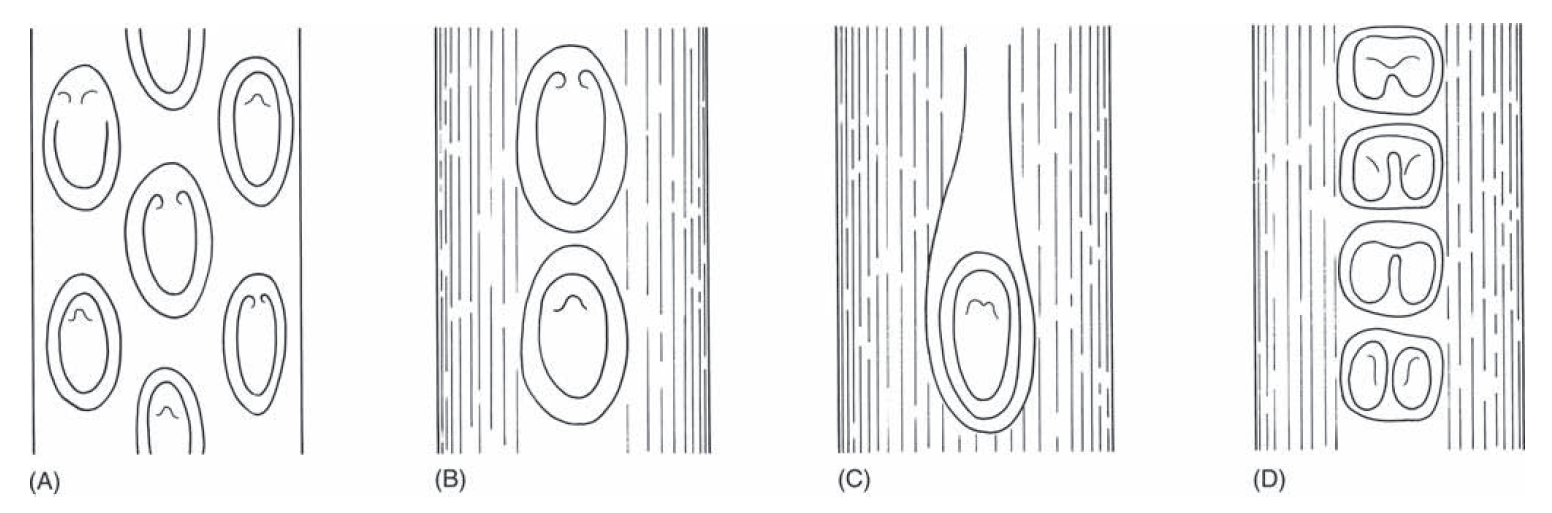
Psaronius stem surface petiole base configurations. A. Caulopteris . B. Megaphyton . C. Hagiophyton . D. Artisophyton

== Relationship to modern ferns ==
Psaronius has been included in the fern family Marattiaceae. Living representatives of this family include many large ferns but none are a 'tree form' like Psaronius. Recent molecular studies indicate that this group of ferns have a very old lineage and may be a sister group to the horsetails Equisetum. Modern tree ferns have many similarities to Psaronius but are in a younger fern family, the Cyatheales. It has also been placed in the extinct family Psaroniaceae.
