= Kraurogymnocarpa =

Scientific classification
- Kingdom: Fungi
- Division: Ascomycota
- Class: Eurotiomycetes
- Order: Onygenales
- Family: Gymnoascaceae
- Genus: Kraurogymnocarpa; Udagawa & Uchiyama

Type species
- Kraurogymnocarpa lenticulispora Udagawa & Uchiy.

Genus of fungi

Kraurogymnocarpa is a genus of fungi within the Gymnoascaceae family. This is a monotypic genus, containing the single species Kraurogymnocarpa lenticulispora.
