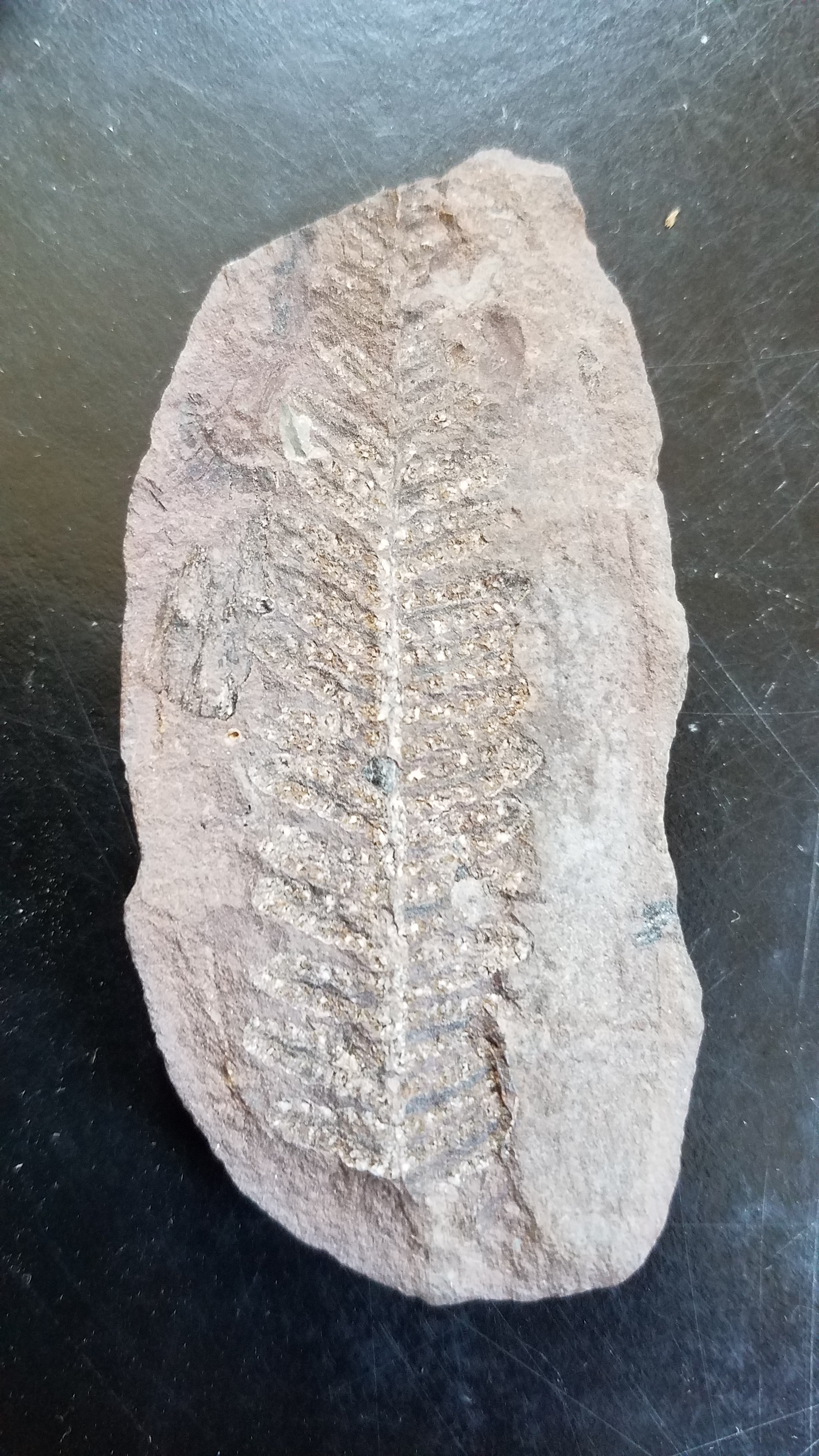
- Asterotheca cyathea

Scientific classification
- Kingdom: Plantae
- Division: Pteridophyta
- Class: Filicopsida
- Order: Marattiales
- Family: Asterothecaceae
- Genus: Asterotheca

Species
- A. aspidioides; A. candolleana; A. cyathea; A. daubrei; A. hemitelioides; A. lamuriana; A. miltoni; A. sensu

= Asterotheca =

Asterotheca Temporal range: Carboniferous to Triassic 359.2–199 Ma

Genus of plants

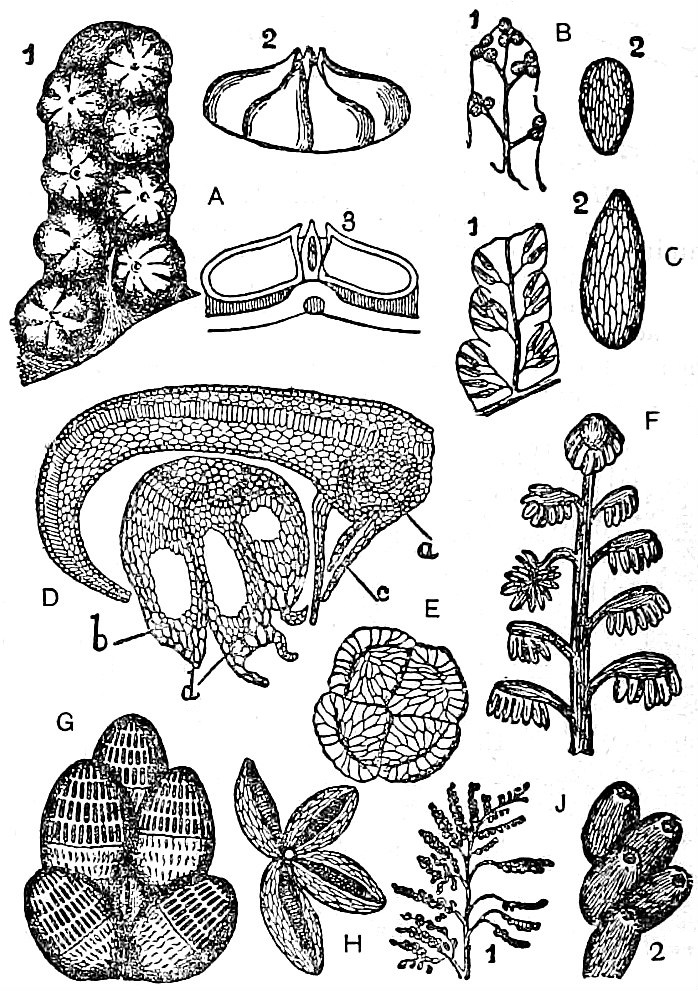
Palaeozoic fructifications of Ferns or Pteridosperms

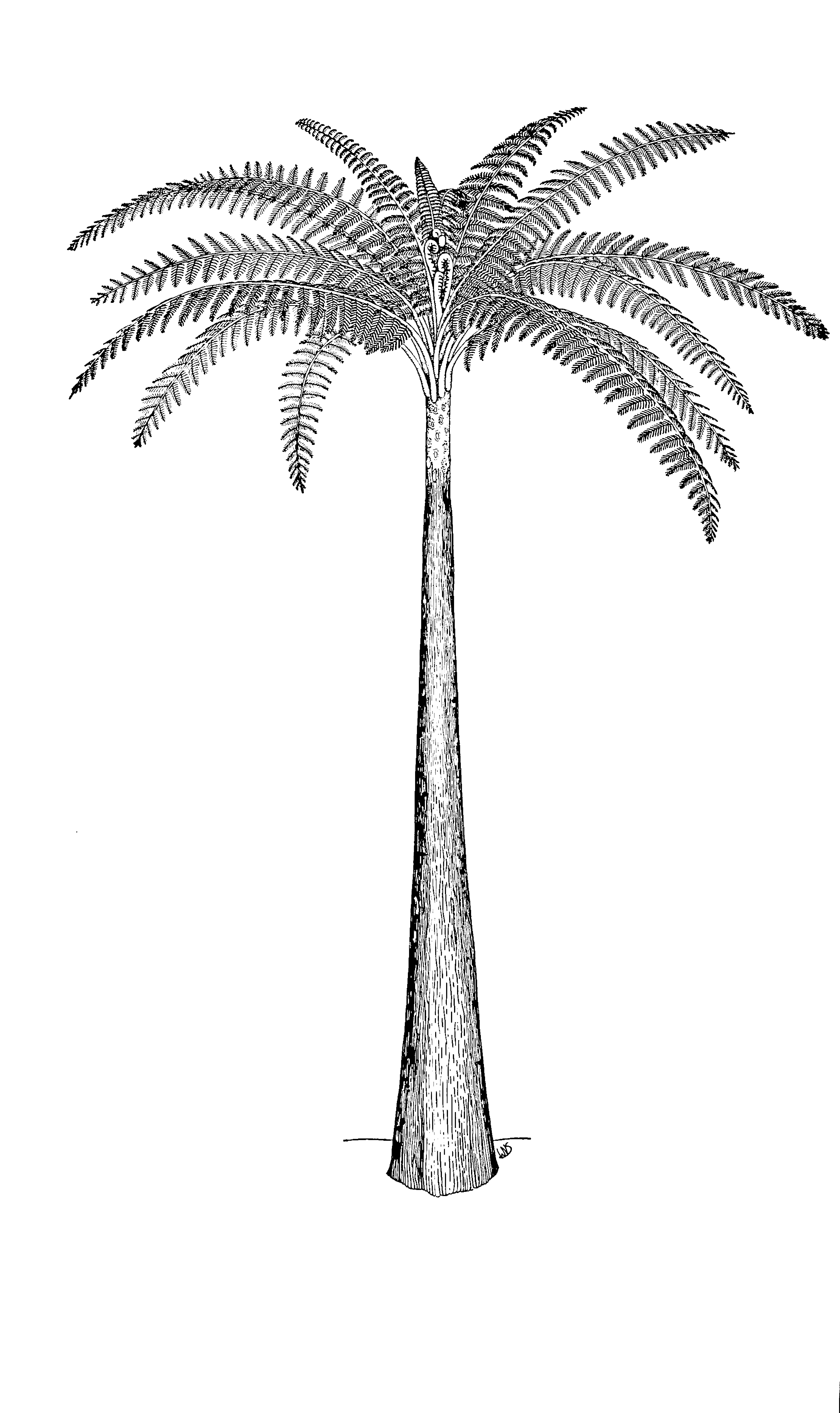
Psaronius sp. - trunk section

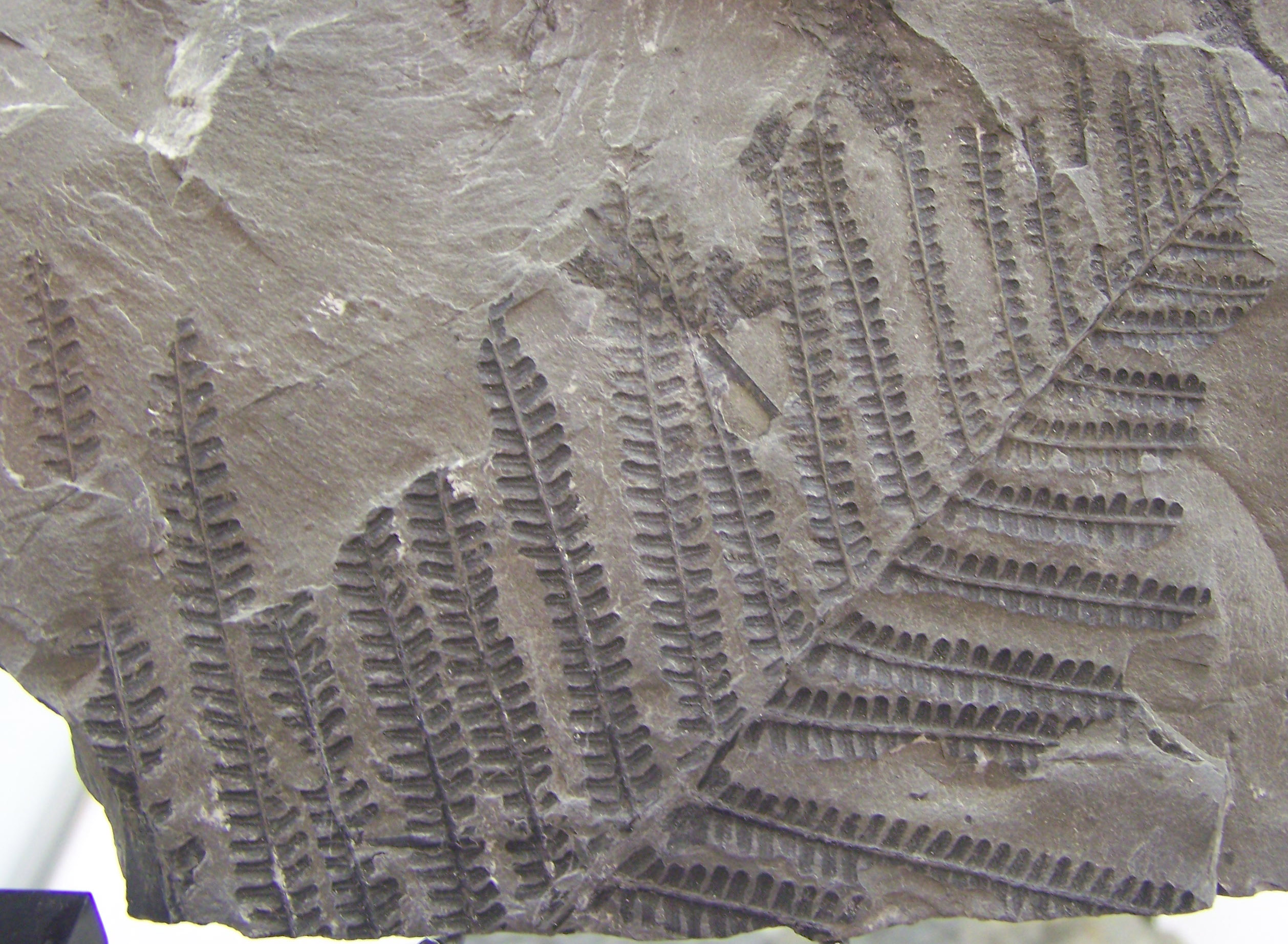
Pecopteris arborescens - compression foliage

Asterotheca is a genus of extinct seedless, spore-bearing, vascularized ferns dating from the Carboniferous of the Paleozoic to the Triassic of the Mesozoic.

== Description ==
Asterotheca sp. is a vascularized, seedless fern that reproduces via spores that require the presence of water. This genus of fern lived from the Carboniferous to the Triassic and is an ancestor to all modern seed plants.

The leaves of Asterotheca (and all ferns) are called fronds. Fossilized specimens show large, morphologically complex structures that consist of leaf segments called pinnae. Each pinna consists of four to eight sporangia. Asterotheca fronds are unipinnate because there is only a single row of pinnae on each side of the rachis, or main central stem.

Asterotheca cyathea displays open dichotomous unipinnate segments, each with four to five eusporangia.

== Synonyms ==
In the field of paleobotany, different parts of plant fossils are assigned different taxonomic names based on how they are preserved.

Synonyms for Asterotheca include:

1. Pecopteris arborescens - compression foliage
2. Psaronius - trunk
3. Scolecopteris - permineralized foliage

== Reproduction ==
True ferns (Filicales) are vascular plants that reproduce by way of spores that require water to disperse their gametophytes. Families of ferns are classified according to the arrangement and morphology of their sporangia and are generally categorized into two groups: the eusporangia and leptosprangia. Asterotheca exhibited eusporangia that are partially fused within a larger synangium that is most commonly characterized with four to eight sporangia.

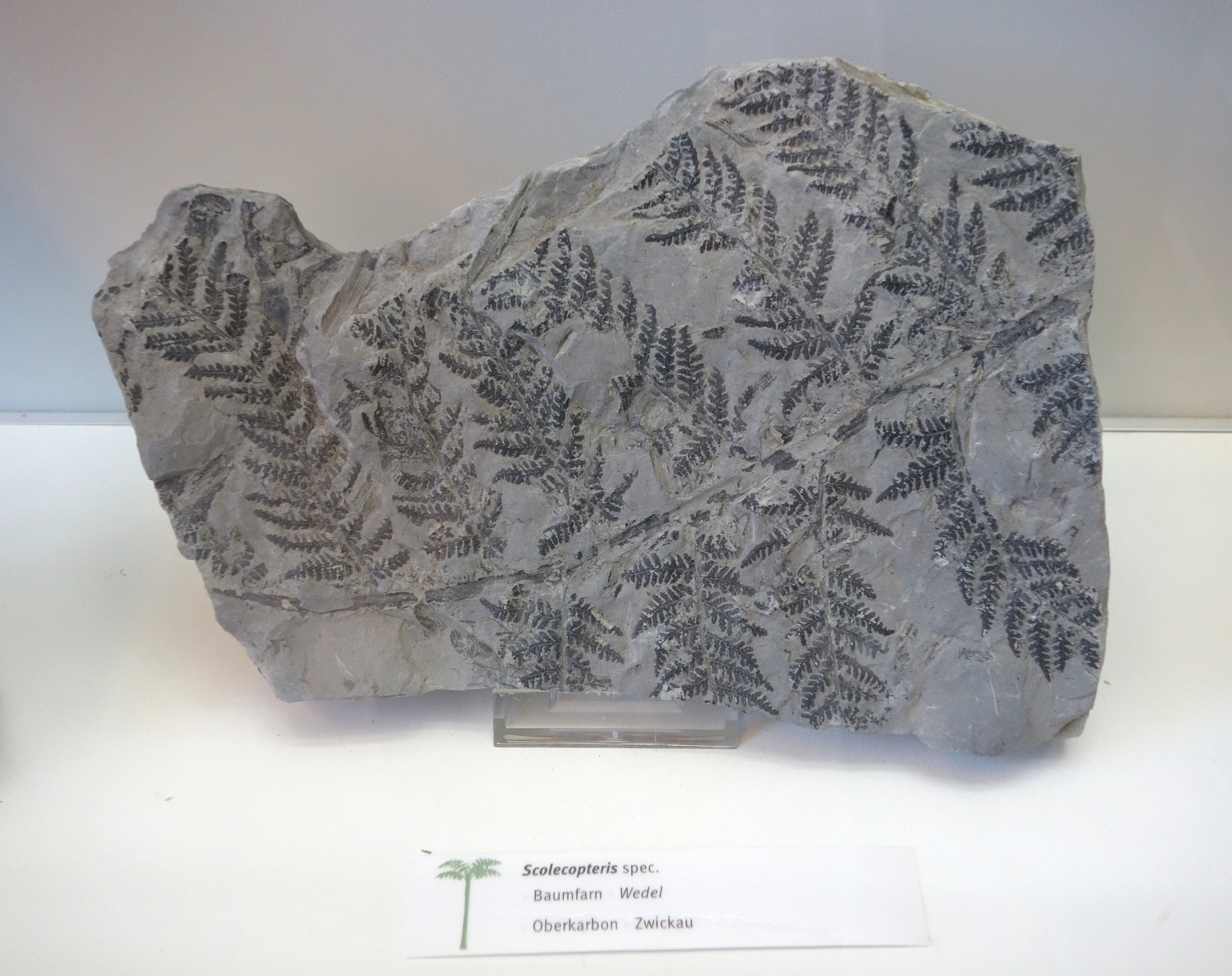
Scolecopteris sp.

The reproduction cycle of Asterotheca, like that of all seedless ferns, is an alternation of generations. In this life cycle, there is an alternation between two different forms (gametophytes and sporophytes) that are alternately sexual and asexual.

The alternation of generations in ferns can be generalized in five steps:

1. Gametophytes produce haploid gametes via mitosis
2. Two gametes unite (one from another plant) and form a diploid zygote
3. The newly formed zygote develops into a multicellular diploid sporophyte
4. The sporophyte produces haploid spores by meiosis
5. The spores develop into multicellular haploid gametophytes

== Fructifications of some Paleozoic seedless plants ==
A - Asterotheca. 1, Pinnule bearing 8 synangia. 2, Synangium in side view. 3, In section, magnified.

B - Renaultia. 1, Fertile pinnule, nat size. 2, Sporangium, enlarged.

C - Dactylotheca, as in B.

D - Sturiella. Section of pinnule and synangium. a, Vascular bundle; c, hairs; b, d, annulus, magnified.

E - Oligocarpia. Sorus in surface-view, magnified.

F - Crossotheca. Fertile pinnule, bearing several tufts of microsporangia, magnified.

G - Senftenbergia. Group of annulate sporangia, magnified.

H - Hawlea. Synangium after dehiscence, magnified.

J - Urnatopteris. 1, Part of fertile pinna, nat. size. 2, Sporangia, showing apical pores, magnified.

Of the above. A, D, E, G and H, probably belong to true Ferns; F is the male fructification of a Pteridosperm (Lyginodendron); the rest are of doubtful nature.

== Significance of seedless vascular plants ==
The evolution of vascular plants with roots and leaves during the Devonian and early Carboniferous increased the rate of photosynthesis, and, thus, increased the rate of CO_{2} removal from the Earth's atmosphere by almost a factor of five during the Carboniferous.

== Paleoenvironments ==
Asterotheca, like all seedless ferns, requires an environment with abundant water for survival. Suitable paleoenvironments include tropical everwet, tropical summerwet, warm temperate, and cool temperate biomes.
