= Gymnoascoideus =

Scientific classification
- Kingdom: Fungi
- Division: Ascomycota
- Class: Eurotiomycetes
- Order: Onygenales
- Family: Gymnoascaceae
- Genus: Gymnoascoideus; G.F. Orr, K. Roy & G.R. Ghosh

Type species
- Gymnoascoideus petalosporus G.F. Orr, K. Roy & G.R. Ghosh

Genus of fungi

Gymnoascoideus is a genus of fungi within the Gymnoascaceae family.
