= Gymnascella =

Scientific classification
- Kingdom: Fungi
- Division: Ascomycota
- Class: Eurotiomycetes
- Order: Onygenales
- Family: Gymnoascaceae
- Genus: Gymnascella; Peck (1884)

Type species
- Gymnascella aurantiaca Peck (1884)

Synonyms
- Pseudoarachniotus Kuehn (1957)

Genus of fungi

Gymnascella is a genus of fungi in the family Gymnoascaceae. It was described by American mycologist Charles Horton Peck in 1884 with Gymnascella aurantiaca as the type species.

== Species ==
- Gymnascella aurantiaca
- Gymnascella calcarea
- Gymnascella citrina
- Gymnascella confluens
- Gymnascella dankaliensis
- Gymnascella devroeyi
- Gymnascella hyalinospora
- Gymnascella kamyschkoi
- Gymnascella marismortui
- Gymnascella nodulosa
