= Orromyces =

Scientific classification
- Kingdom: Fungi
- Division: Ascomycota
- Class: Eurotiomycetes
- Order: Onygenales
- Family: Gymnoascaceae
- Genus: Orromyces; Sur & G.R.Ghosh (1987)

Type species
- Orromyces spiralis B.Sur & G.R.Ghosh (1987)

Genus of fungi

Orromyces is a fungal genus in the family Gymnoascaceae. This is a monotypic genus, containing the single species Orromyces spiralis.
