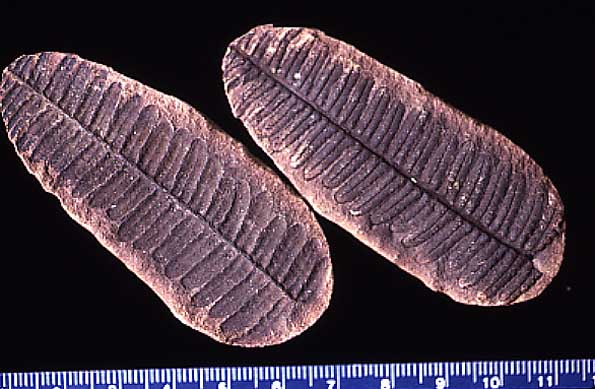
- Partial frond of Pecopteris villosa from Mazon Creek (Carboniferous)

Scientific classification
- Kingdom: Plantae
- Division: Pteridophyta
- Class: Filicopsida
- Order: Marattiales
- Family: Marattiaceae
- Genus: Pecopteris Brongn.

Species
- Approximately 250 to 300, see text

= Pecopteris =

Pecopteris Temporal range: Late Devonian to Early Permian

Extinct genus of ferns

Pecopteris is a very common form genus of leaves. Most Pecopteris leaves and fronds are associated with the marattialean tree fern Psaronius. However, Pecopteris-type foliage also is borne on several filicalean ferns, and at least one seed fern. Pecopteris first appeared in the Devonian period, but flourished in the Carboniferous, especially the Pennsylvanian. Plants bearing these leaves became extinct in the Permian period, due to swamps disappearing and temperatures on Earth dropping.

== Etymology ==
Pecopteris is derived from the Greek pekin, (to comb), and pteris, (a fern). This is because the leaflets of Pecopteris fronds are arranged like the teeth on a comb.

== Species ==
As of 1997, there have been 250-300 species assigned to Pecopteris.

In Brazil, fossil of form genus Pecopteris was located in outcrop Morro Papalé in the city of Mariana Pimentel. They are in the geopark Paleorrota in Rio Bonito Formation and date from Sakmarian in Permian.

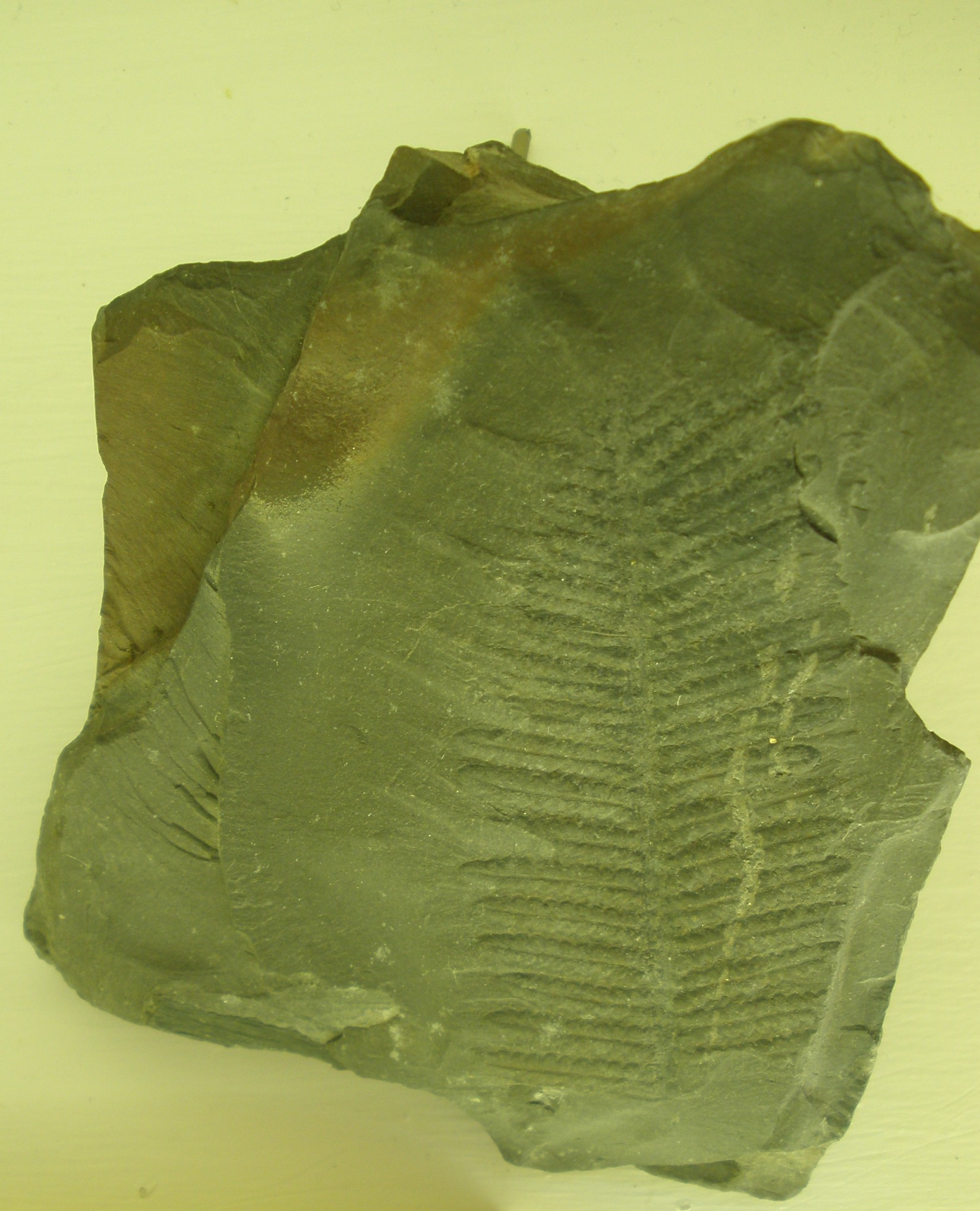
Pecopteris unita

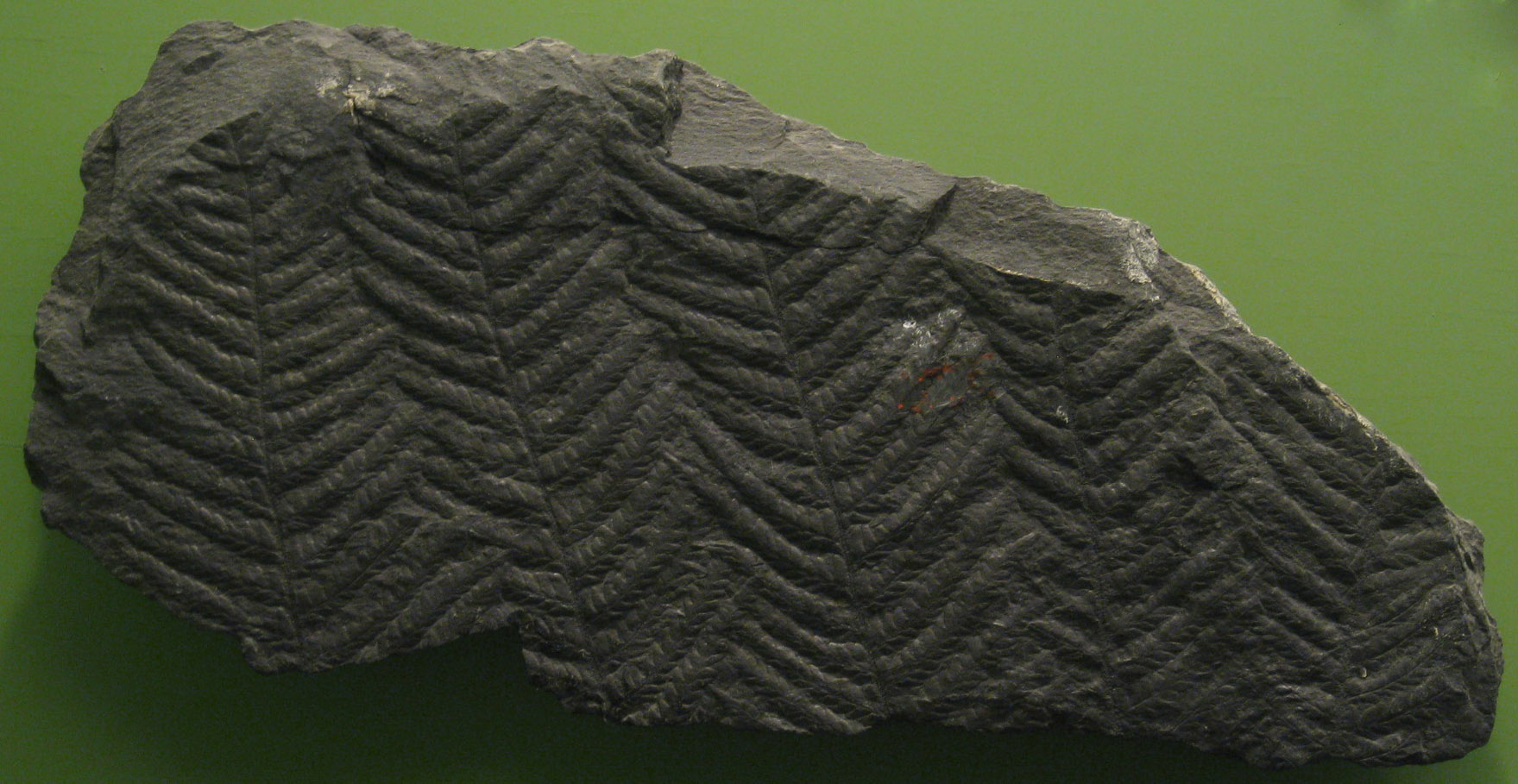
Pecopteris on display at the State Museum of Pennsylvania

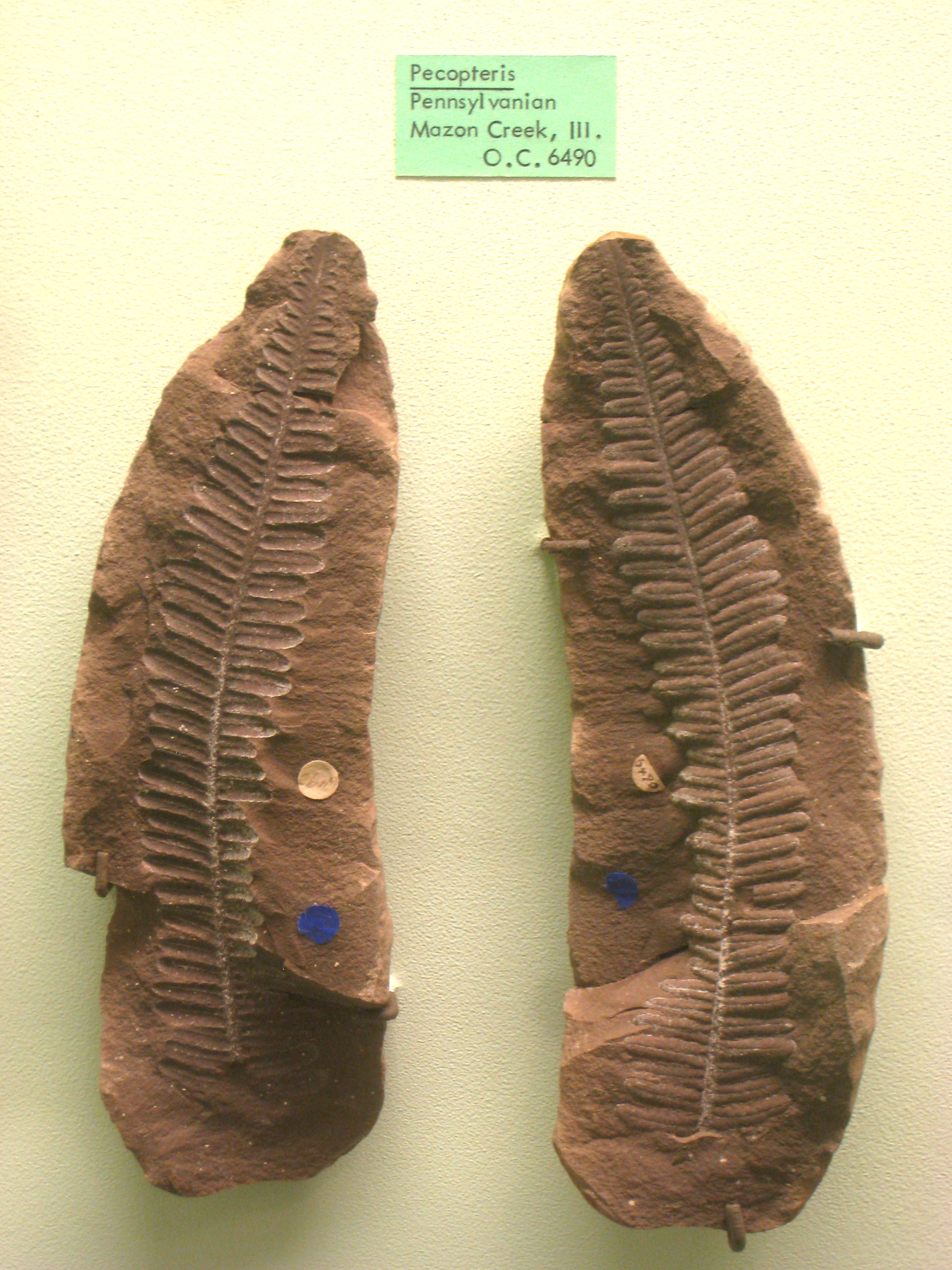
Pecopteris in the Exhibit Museum of Natural History, Ann Arbor
