= Mallochia =

Scientific classification
- Kingdom: Fungi
- Division: Ascomycota
- Class: Eurotiomycetes
- Order: Onygenales
- Family: Gymnoascaceae
- Genus: Mallochia; Arx & Samson (1986)

Type species
- Mallochia echinulata (B.G.Dutta & G.R.Ghosh) Arx & Samson (1986)

Species
- M. echinulata M. endodonta M. reticulata M. transmutans

Genus of fungi

Mallochia is a genus of fungi in the family Gymnoascaceae.
