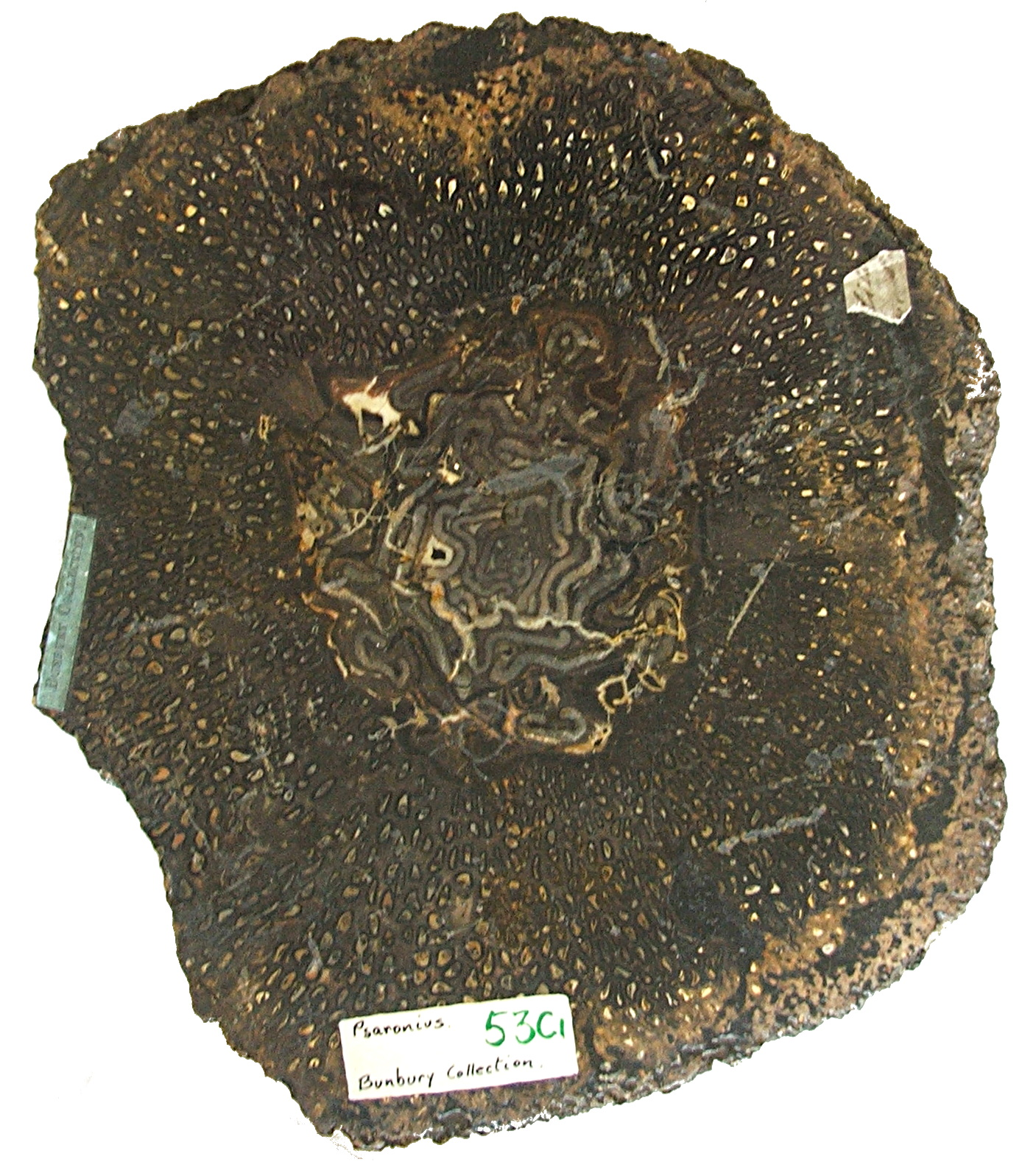
- A section of Psaronius from the Bunsbury collection, Sedgwick Museum.

Scientific classification
- Kingdom: Plantae
- Clade: Tracheophytes
- Division: Polypodiophyta
- Class: Polypodiopsida
- Order: Marattiales
- Family: †Psaroniaceae; Unger

Genera
- See text.

= Psaroniaceae =

Extinct family of ferns

Psaroniaceae is an extinct family of marattialean tree ferns from the Carboniferous–Permian interval. Most fossilized genera, species and spores of the order Marattiales may be placed in this family. Members of the family differ from Mesozoic and more recent tree ferns in the way the roots were produced, in the structure and organization of fronds and pinnules, and in dehiscence. Some sources merge the family into a much larger family, Asterothecaceae.

Fossil genera of the family include:

- Psaronius Cotta – Carboniferous-Permian, more or less cosmopolitan
- Tietea Solms-Laubach – Permian, Paraná and Parnaíba Basins in Brazil
- Tuvichapteris Herbst – Permian, Paraná Basin in Paraguay and Uruguay
- Cyathocarpus Ernest Weiss – Carboniferous, Mazon Creek in the United States, Douro Carboniferous Basin in Portugal
