= Arachniotus =

Scientific classification
- Kingdom: Fungi
- Division: Ascomycota
- Class: Eurotiomycetes
- Order: Onygenales
- Family: Gymnoascaceae
- Genus: Arachniotus; J.Schröt. (1893)

Type species
- Arachniotus ruber (Tiegh.) J.Schröt. (1893)

Synonyms
- Rollandina Pat. (1905); Waldemaria Bat. (1960); Petalosporus G.R.Ghosh, G.F.Orr & Kuehn (1963); Disarticulatus G.F.Orr (1977); Plunkettomyces G.F.Orr (1977)

Genus of fungi

Arachniotus is a genus of fungi within the family Gymnoascaceae.

== Species ==
- Arachniotus aurantiacus
- Arachniotus candidus
- Arachniotus ellipticosporus
- Arachniotus flavoluteus
- Arachniotus hebridensis
- Arachniotus hyalotrichus
- Arachniotus indicus
- Arachniotus insolitus
- Arachniotus lanatus
- Arachniotus littoralis
- Arachniotus punctatus
- Arachniotus ruber
- Arachniotus terrestris
- Arachniotus trisporus
- Arachniotus verruculosus
