= Filadélfia, Tocantins =

Municipality in Tocantins, Brazil

Coordinates: 7°20′09″S 47°29′24″W

Filadélfia
- Municipality
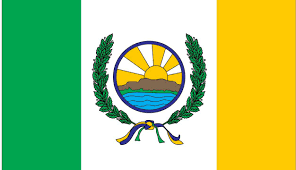
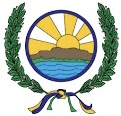
- Flag Coat of arms
- Interactive map of Filadélfia
- Country: Brazil
- Region: Northern
- State: Tocantins
- Mesoregion: Ocidental do Tocantins

Population (2020)
  - Total: 8,874
- Time zone: UTC−3 (BRT)

Filadélfia, Tocantins is a municipality in the state of Tocantins in the Northern region of Brazil.

The municipality holds the Tocantins Fossil Trees Natural Monument, which preserves one of the largest collections of fossilized Permian trees in the world.

== See also ==
- List of municipalities in Tocantins
