= Tocantins Fossil Trees Natural Monument =

- Monumento Natural das Árvores Fossilizadas do Tocantins
- IUCN category III (natural monument or feature)
- Location within Brazil
- Nearest city: Araguaína, Tocantins
- Coordinates: 7.445°S 47.792°W
- Area: 32,152 hectares (79,450 acres)
- Designation: Natural monument
- Created: 4 October 2000

The Tocantins Fossil Trees Natural Monument (Portuguese: Monumento Natural das Árvores Fossilizadas do Tocantins) is a natural monument in the state of Tocantins, Brazil.

== Location ==
The 32,152 hectares (79,450 acres) protection unit was created by law 32.152 on 4 October 2000. It lies with the municipality of Filadélfia, Tocantins. The buffer zone includes the municipality of Babaçulândia. It is administered by the Tocantins Nature Institute (Instituto Natureza do Tocantins). The advisory council includes members of the Tocantins Nature Institute, Federal University of Tocantins, Filadélfia municipality, Bielândia Association of Small Farmers and representatives of local businesses.

Most of the visitors to the palaeontological site are groups of high school students or scholars from various parts of the country. The visitor reception centre for the national monument was inaugurated on 2 June 2015 by governor Marcelo Miranda. It had administrative headquarters, bathrooms, male and female quarters, an auditorium and parking. This would make it possible for students to stay overnight.

== Conservation ==
The unit lies in the Tocantins cerrado. The objectives are to support scientific work and research, and to protect and conserve the palaeontological and biological diversity of the site. The monument holds the most important petrified forest in the southern hemisphere from the Permian period, which lasted from 299 to 250 million years ago. Some of the fossilized plants are tree ferns. At the end of the Permian there was a mass extinction of flora and fauna in which about 90% or marine species and 70% of land species disappeared.

== Sources ==
- Árvores Fossilizadas do Estado do Tocantins (in Portuguese), ISA: Instituto Socioambiental
- Ascom/Naturatins (2015-05-28), "Monumento 'Árvores Fossilizadas' será inaugurado em Bielândia; floresta petrificada existe há 250 milhões de anos", Araguaína Notícias (in Portuguese)
- Tânia Caldas (27 February 2016), "Monumento natural das árvores fossilizadas do Tocantins renova conselho consultivo", Surgiu (in Portuguese), archived from the original on 1 March 2016
- Wherbert Araújo (2015-06-02), Monumento Natural das Árvores Fossilizadas fortalece turismo ecológico da região norte do Estado (in Portuguese)
