= Acitheca =

Scientific classification
- Kingdom: Fungi
- Division: Ascomycota
- Class: Eurotiomycetes
- Order: Onygenales
- Family: Gymnoascaceae
- Genus: Acitheca; Currah

Type species
- Acitheca purpurea Thaxt. ex Currah

Genus of fungi

Acitheca is a genus of fungi within the Gymnoascaceae family. This is a monotypic genus, containing the single species Acitheca purpurea.
