= François Cyrille Grand'Eury =

French geologist (1839–1917)

François Cyrille Grand'Eury (9 March 1839, Houdreville – 22 July 1917, Malzéville) was a French geologist, paleontologist and mathematics teacher.

He studied at the École Loritz in Nancy and at the École des mines in Saint-Étienne, and later worked as a mining engineer in Roche-la-Molière. From 1863 to 1899 he taught classes in mathematics at the École des mines in Saint-Étienne, where in 1883 he received the title of professor.

From 1877 he was a member of the Société géologique de France and in 1885 was elected a correspondent member of the Académie des Sciences.

He is remembered for his stratigraphic research of coal fields and for his investigations involving the formation of coal. He is credited with establishing the chronological succession of floras associated with the coal seams of the Stephanian stage (named after the development of this stage at Saint-Étienne). He conducted exhaustive studies of coal flora (Cordaites, Calamites, et al), and in 1877 described the genus Tubiculites.

== Principal works ==
- La flore carbonifère de la Loire et du centre de la France (1877) – The Carboniferous flora of the department of Loire and of central France.
- Mémoire sur la formation de la houille (1882) – Treatise on the formation of coal.
- Formation des couches de houille et du terrain houiller (1887) – Stratigraphy associated with coal and coal fields.
- Géologie et paléontologie du bassin houiller du Gard (1890) – Geology and paleontology of the coal fields in Gard.

== Gallery ==
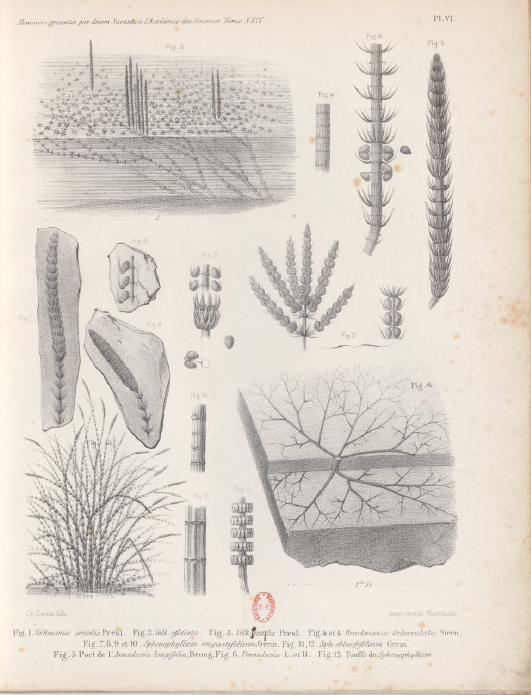
Illustration of fossil flora from the Loire basin, in "Flore carbonifère du département de la Loire et du Centre de la France".

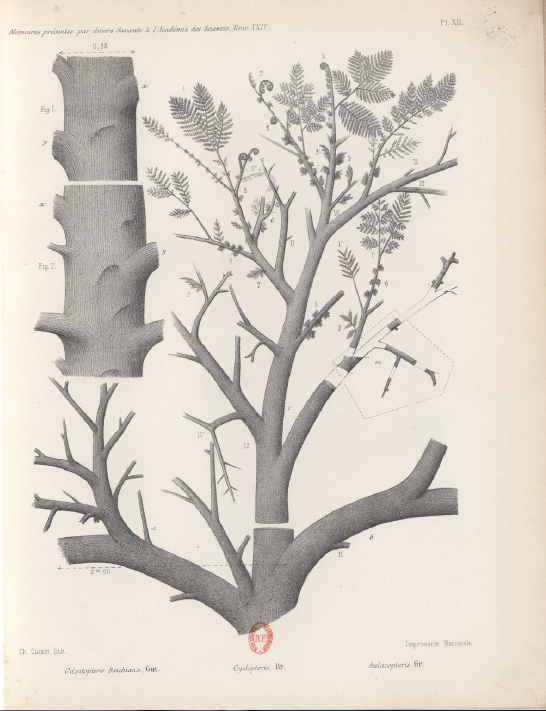
Illustration of fossil flora from the Loire basin, in "Flore carbonifère du département de la Loire et du Centre de la France".

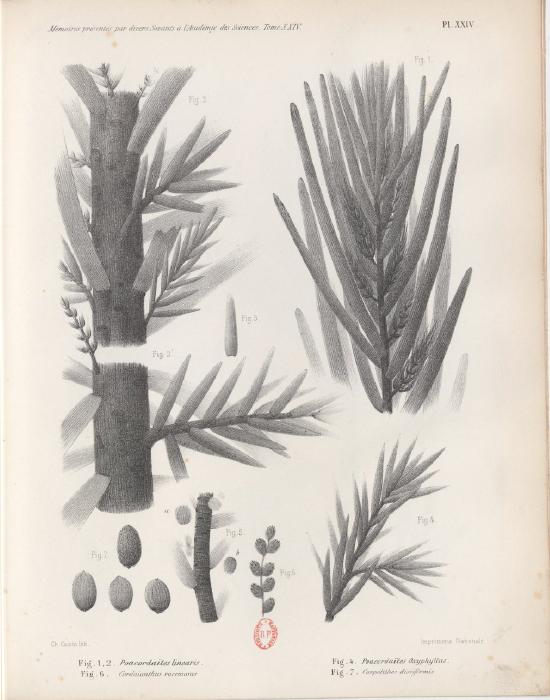
Illustration of fossil flora from the Loire basin, in "Flore carbonifère du département de la Loire et du Centre de la France".
