= Gymnoascaceae =

Scientific classification
- Kingdom: Fungi
- Division: Ascomycota
- Class: Eurotiomycetes
- Order: Onygenales
- Family: Gymnoascaceae; Baran.

Type genus
- Gymnoascus Baran.

Genera
- Acitheca; Arachniotus; Gymnascella; Gymnoascoideus; Gymnoascus; Kraurogymnocarpa; Mallochia; Narasimhella; Orromyces

Family of fungi

The Gymnoascaceae are a family of fungi in the Ascomycota, class Eurotiomycetes.
