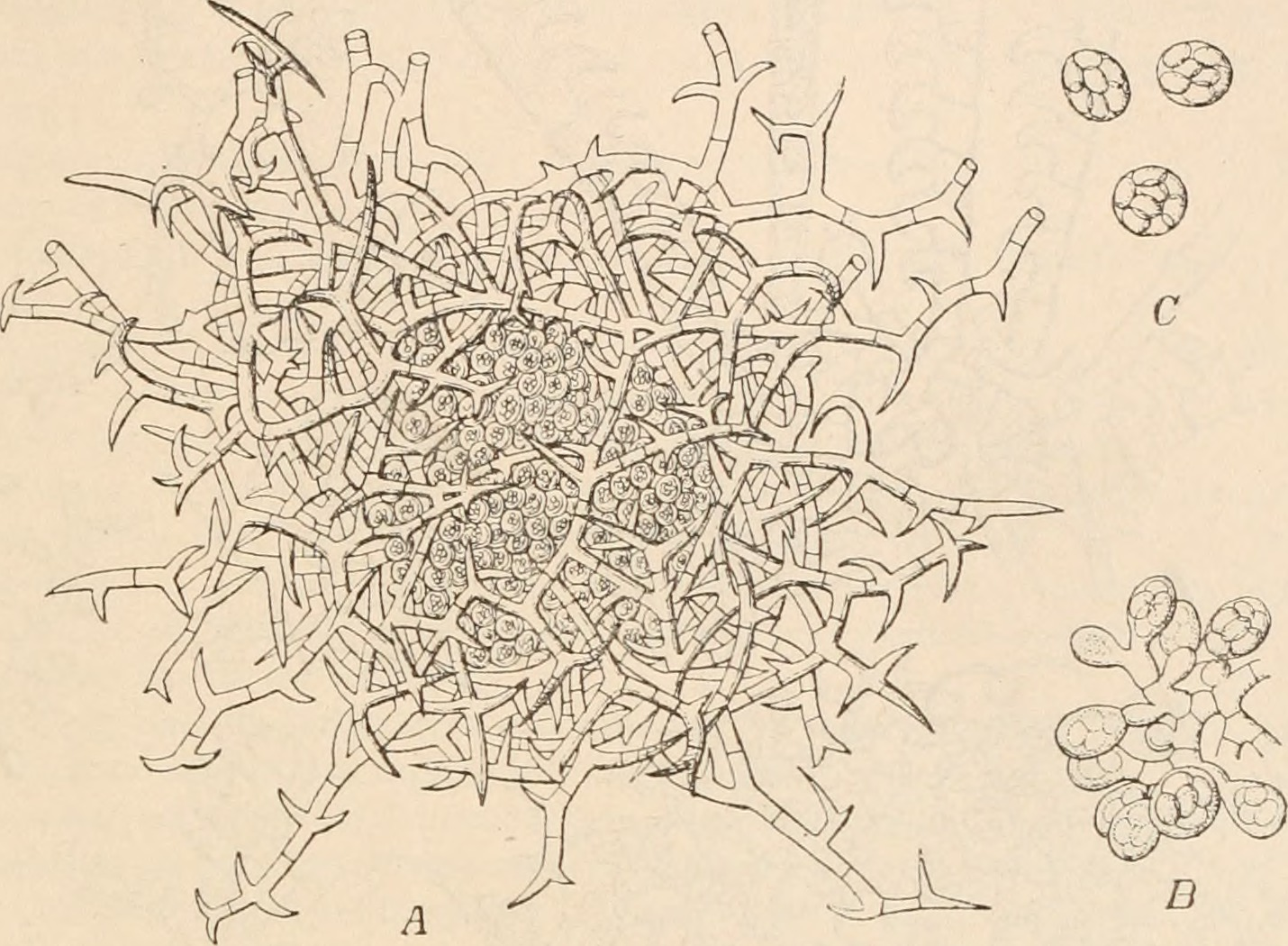

Scientific classification
- Kingdom: Fungi
- Division: Ascomycota
- Class: Eurotiomycetes
- Order: Onygenales
- Family: Gymnoascaceae
- Genus: Gymnoascus; Baran. (1872)

Type species
- Gymnoascus reessii Baran. (1872)

Synonyms
- Myrillium Clem. (1931); Tripedotrichum G.F.Orr & Kuehn (1964)

= Gymnoascus =

Genus of fungi

Gymnoascus is a genus of fungi within the Gymnoascaceae family. The genus, widely distributed in northern temperate areas, contains eight species.
